= White Pagoda Park =

Park in Hangzhou, Zhejiang, China

- 白塔公园
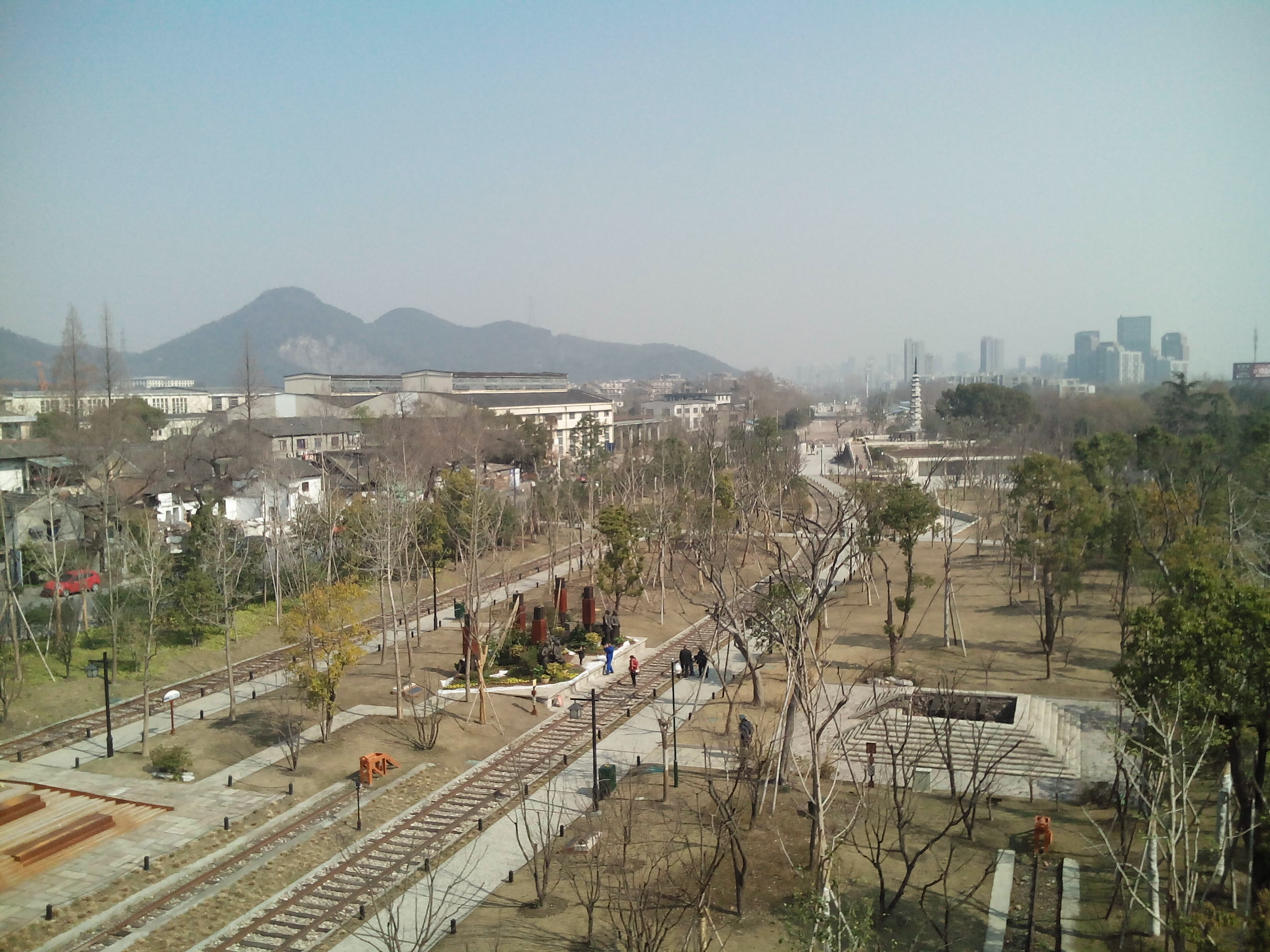
- Interactive map of White Pagoda Park
- Type: Public, Free
- Location: 12 Old Fuxing Road, Shangcheng District, Hangzhou, China
- Coordinates: 30.201925°N 120.138092°E
- Area: 78.4 hectares (194 acres)
- Opened: May 1, 2014; 12 years ago
- Open: 9am-4:30pm
- Parking: 284 parking lots
- Public transit: 4 Shuicheng Bridge
- Admission: Free (20 yuan for a train ride)

The White Pagoda Park (simplified Chinese: 白塔公园; traditional Chinese: 白塔公園; pinyin: Bái Tǎ Gōngyuán), or romanised as the Baita Park, is a park in Shangcheng, Hangzhou, Zhejiang, China. The park opened on 1 May 2014. On the north bank of Qiantang River and the south border of the West Lake Scenic Area, the park is part of the Grand Canal National Cultural Park in Hangzhou. Within the park, there are the White Pagoda that can date back to the Five Dynasties and Ten Kingdoms period and the historical relics of the Jianggan-Gongshu Railway, which was opened in 1908 as the first railway in Zhejiang.

== History ==
On 25 November 2010, the People's Congress of Hangzhou announced a plan to build a White Pagoda Park centred around the White Pagoda. On 13 June 2012, a modernisation and vivation plan of the White Pagoda was proposed by the Hangzhou Municipal People's Government to the Standing Committee of People's Congress of Hangzhou, which was approved on 14 June.

Covering an area of 78.4 hectares, the planned area further included the historic relics of the Jianggan-Gongshu Railway, which was the first railway in Zhejiang, and the Qiantang River Bridge, the first Chinese-designed steel bridge. With the completion of Phase 1 construction of an area of 17 hectares, the park was opened on 1 May 2014.

In April 2018, the park was included in the Grand Canal National Cultural Park. In December 2018, the historical sites of the railway was transformed into Hangzhou Railway Museum and the Sent-down Youth Memorial. A lighting system was installed since May 2020.

== White Pagoda ==
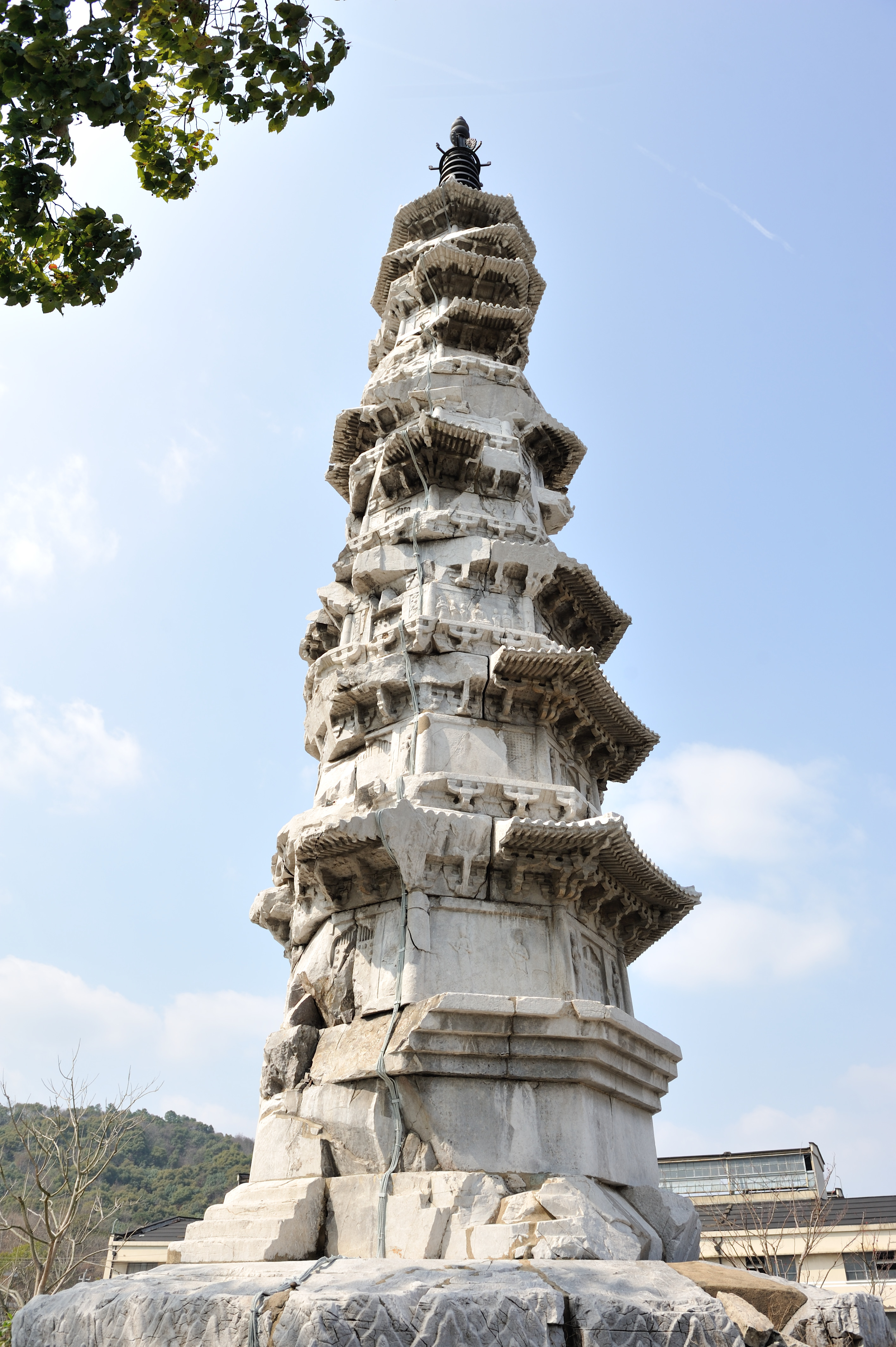
White Pagoda in 2015

The White Pagoda in the park was at the Baita Hill, which is named after the pagoda, near the Qiantang River. Due to its geographical proximity to the site where the Grand Canal flows into the Qiantang River, the pagoda was used for ship navigation. The pagoda looks like a wooden structure but was made of stacked stone, which has nine floors, with a total height of 14 metres. Structured as an octagon, each floor of the pagoda shrinks in area until the tip of the pagoda. The stone reliefs on eight sides of the octagon represents the nine mountains and eight seas in Buddhism.

In the 1930s, to repair the Liuhe Pagoda nearby, Liang Sicheng and Lin Huiyin investigated the architectural design of the White Pagoda as a reference of contemporary buildings. In the 1960s and 1970s, there were repairment made by archaeologists to the pagoda. In 1988, the pagoda was selected as a Major Historical and Cultural Site Protected at the National Level. In 1999, the Hangzhou Municipal Bureau of Gardens and Cultural Relics repaired and cleaned up the pagoda. In 2005, a CCTV system was installed around the pagoda. In the original construction plan of the White Pagoda Park in 2010, the White Pagoda was said to be protected by a transparent cover, which was not done when the park was finished in 2014.

There is no historical record that indicates the year of construction of the pagoda, yet its architectural style resembles those Buddhist Pagoda built during the Five Dynasties and Ten Kingdoms period (AD 907–960). During the Song dynasty, the area near the White Pagoda was a prosperous harbour. Song Chinese politician Fan Zhongyan described that there was a White Pagoda Temple in the region, which was long gone after Song. During the Southern Song dynasty, travelers to Hangzhou always purchased a guide map of Hangzhou, or called Dijing (simplified Chinese: 地经; traditional Chinese: 地經) in Chinese, near the White Pagoda which was the main waterway entrance to the city. A poem was therefore written on the wall of a temple near the White Pagoda to be sarcastic about the government in exile in Hangzhou giving up reclaiming the homeland of Han Chinese in Zhongyuan. In memory of the history, there was a Southern Song Dynasty Map Square built in the park.

== Zhakou Railway Station ==
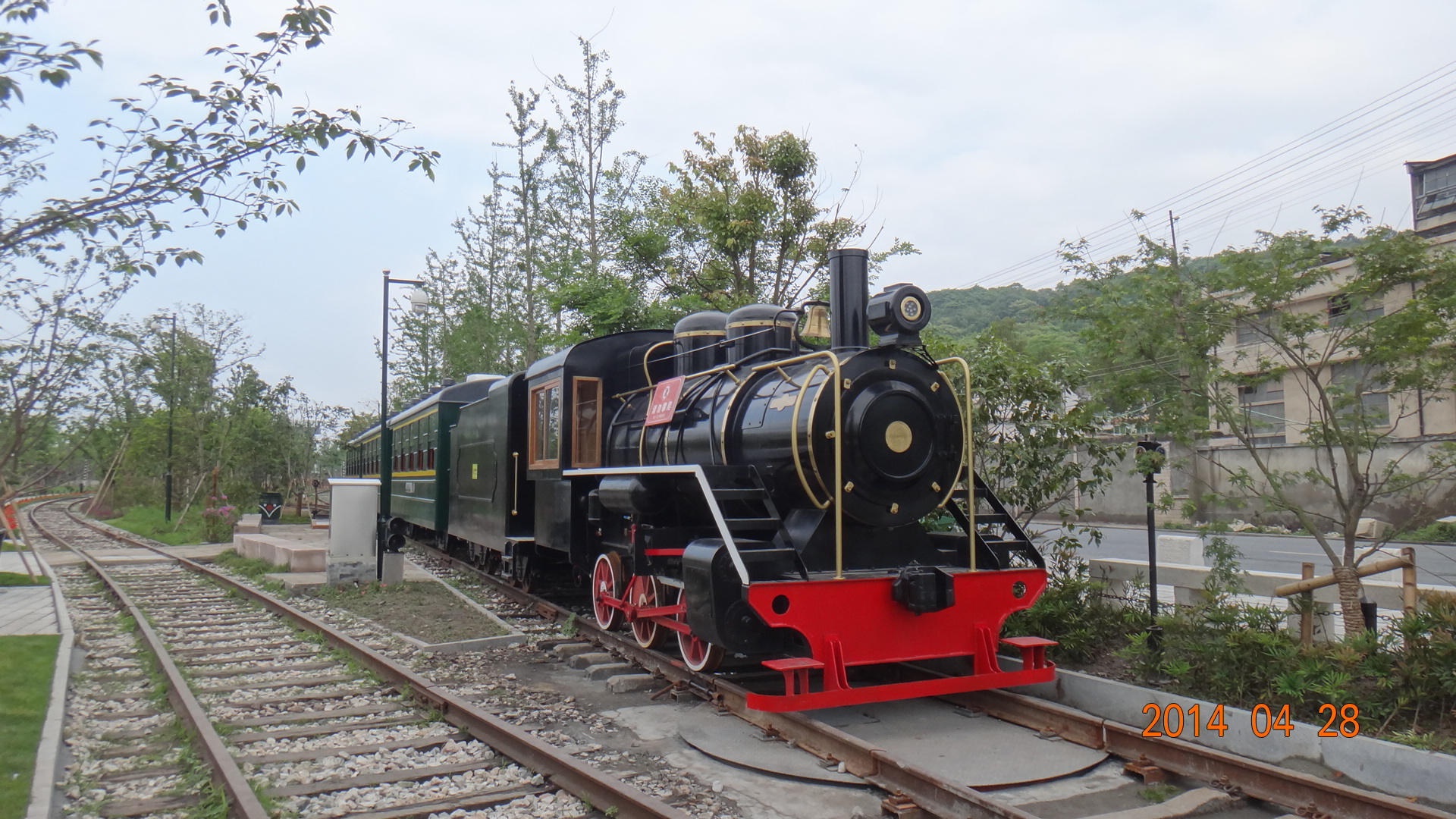
A train at Zhakou Station historical site.

Zhakou Railway Station (simplified Chinese: 闸口站; traditional Chinese: 閘口站) within the park was the south terminal station of the Jianggan-Gongshu Railway. The station was opened on 23 August with the launch of the railway. The Jianggan-Gongshu Railway, or shortly the Jiangshu Railway, was the first railway in Zhejiang. The railway between Genshanmen and Zhakou later became part of the Shanghai-Hangzhou Railway in August 1909. During the Down to the Countryside Movement in 1960s and 1970s, Zhakou was the station of departure of tens of thousands of sent-down youths. From 23 December 1968 to 25 October 1970, these sent-down youths were sent to Heilongjiang via 25 trains, of which all but the first three trains departed at Zhakou.

Apart from the Hangzhou Railway Museum and the Sent-down Youth Memorial, the park preserved the old railway tracks and cars of the Jianggan-Gongshu Railway along with the Zhakou Railway station. The railway tracks were transformed into pedestrian paths. The park preserves two steam locomotives: one for display was transformed into a restaurant and the other running sightseeing train service within the park, which allows visitors to experience a five-minute ride on another steam locomotive. A gantry crane of the railway station was transformed into a cafe, where visitors can have a sight of the Qiantang River, the Liuhe Pagoda, and the White Pagoda.

== See also ==
- Hangchow University Historical Site within Zhijiang Campus, Zhejiang University
- Qiantang River Bridge
- Liuhe Pagoda, also known as the Six Harmony Pagoda
