= Guanghua Law School, Zhejiang University =

Guanghua Law School (simplified Chinese: 光华法学院; traditional Chinese: 光華法學院) is the law school of Zhejiang University in Hangzhou, Zhejiang, China.

== Introduction ==
Guanghua is the law school of Zhejiang University, located in the Zhijiang Campus, Zhejiang University, close to the Liuhe Pagoda and the Qiantang River.

== Brief history ==
It was reorganized in 2007, at the 110th anniversary of Zhejiang University. Before, it was the Zhejiang University's law school, which was first founded in 1945.

In 1952, due to the Adjustment of University Colleges & Departments (中國高校院系調整/中国高校院系调整), Zhejiang University was dissociated and only kept its engineering (major) and a few science (minor) parts. Its humanities and major science parts were separated from the university and further formed the new Hangzhou University, so the law school was moved into the newly established Hangzhou University, and became its Department of Law.

In 1995, the Department of Law, Hangzhou University was enlarged and developed into the Law School, Hangzhou University. In 1998, Hangzhou University re-merged into Zhejiang University, so that Zhejiang University re-obtained its law school.
