= Puyang (disambiguation) =

Puyang may refer to:

- Puyang, a municipality in Henan Province, China
- Puyang County, a county containing the municipality of Puyang, Henan, China
- Puyang River, a river in Zhejiang Province, China
