= Zhijiang Campus, Zhejiang University =

Chinese university campus

- 浙江大学之江校区
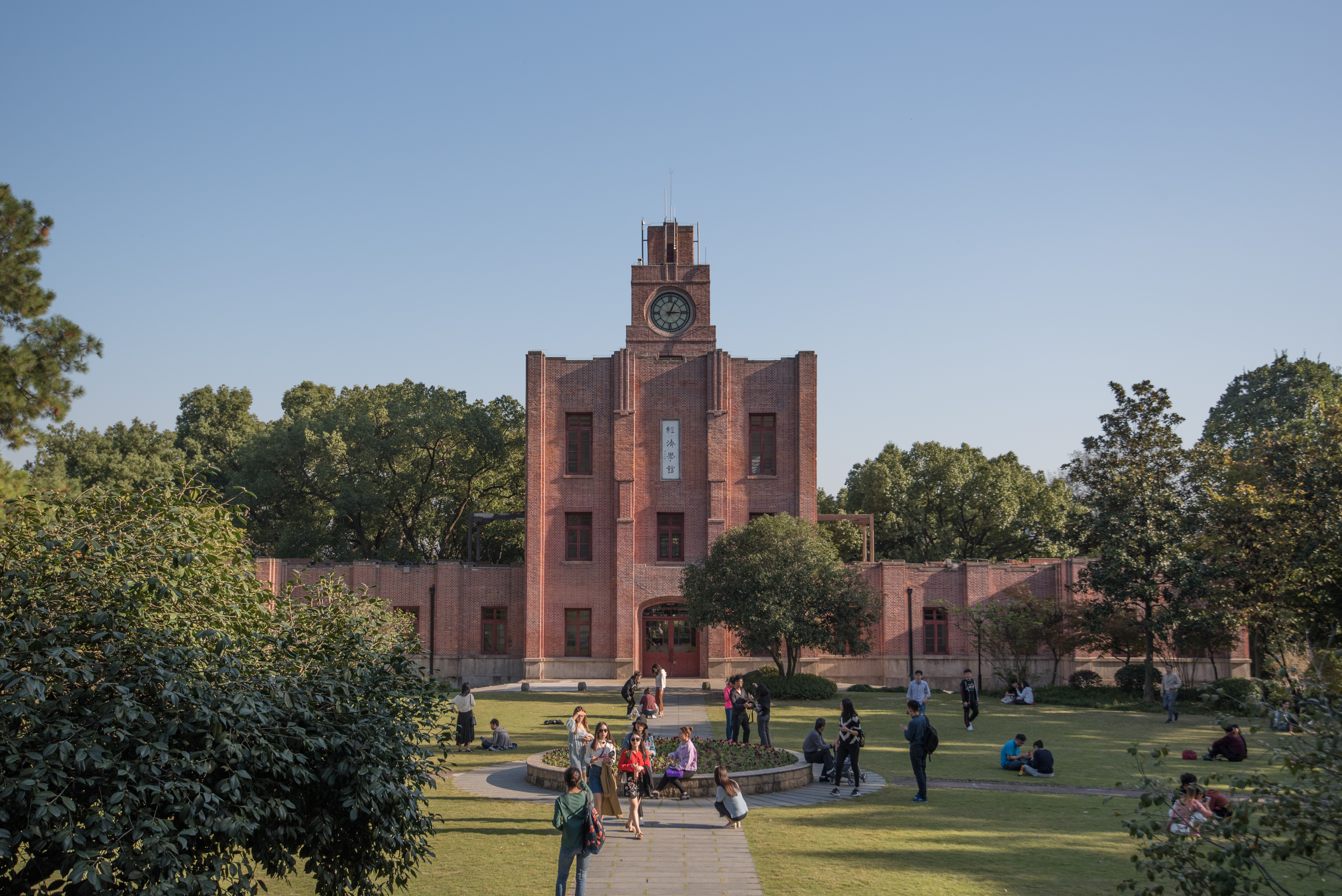
- The Economics Building in 2018
- Former names: Hangchow Christian College; Hangchow College; Hangchow University
- Established: February 1911; 115 years ago
- Parent institution: Zhejiang University
- Location: 51 Zhijiang Road, Hangzhou, Zhejiang, 310008, China; 30.19513°N 120.12043°E
- Campus: 43.33 hectares (107.1 acres)

Zhijiang Campus is an urban campus of Zhejiang University located in Hangzhou, Zhejiang, China. Located on riverside of the Qiantang River and close to the Liuhe Pagoda, it was the oldest university campus in Hangzhou. Built as the campus of Hangchow University, one of the oldest Christian colleges and universities in China, most of its buildings are protected as the Hangchow University Historic Site under the list of Major Sites Protected at the National Level. The campus is now home to James D. Watson Institute of Genome Sciences, Guanghua Law School and the Institute for Advanced Study in Humanities and Social Sciences.

== History ==
The planning of the campus began in 1906, in which year, four foreign missionaries of Presbyterian Church in the United States of America, each based in Hangzhou, Ningbo, Shanghai and Suzhou, along with a representative of the faculty of Hangchow Presbyterian College formed a board of directors. The first meeting of the board was held in November, during which the board resolved to build a new campus outside the urban area of Hangzhou. After the meeting, the college slowly purchased the land of the campus, until the construction began in 1909. As a member of the board and a representative of the churn in Hangzhou, John Leighton Stuart was a major participator during planning and construction, along with his family in Hangzhou. His brother Warren Horton Stuart taught at the college and served as the president of the college from 1916 to 1922, who lived in the Paxton Residence on the campus with his family.

The construction was finished in two phases. With Phase 1 most finished in the Winter of 1910, Hangchow Presbyterian College moved into the campus from Dataer Lane in the city centre of Hangzhou in February 1911. The Chinese name of the college was changed from Yuying (育英, literally nurturing the elites) to Zhijiang (之江, literally "the river", referring to the Qiantang River that the campus borders) after the relocation. In 1914, the college was renamed as Hangchow Christian College in English. In Chinese, it was renamed as Zhijiang University (之江大学).

After the relocation, new buildings continued to be built in the campus. In 1913, the Philadelphia Observatory was built. A wooden bridge was built over the stream in the campus in 1916. In 1918, the Tooker Memorial Chapel was built, along with the systems of tap water and electricity. As the Sino-Japanese war hit Hangzhou in 1937, the Philadelphia Observatory was destroyed by Japanese bombing and the university moved away from Hangzhou to evade the war. During the wartime period, the campus was in poor maintenance. When the university returned to the campus after the war, a major renovation began in March 1946.

In 1951, the university ceased to operate under the new Communist rule, with the American faculty moving to Hong Kong to found Chung Chi College and the campus taken over by the Department of Culture and Education of Zhejiang Provincial Government. During the 1952 reorganisation of Chinese higher education systems, the university was cancelled, with the campus taken over by Zhejiang Teachers College. In 1958, with the merger of Zhejiang Teachers College and Hangzhou University, the campus was reassigned to the Party School of the Zhejiang Provincial Committee of Chinese Communist Party. In 1961, the campus was gained by Zhejiang University. The campus was once renamed as Zhijiang College of Zhejiang University in 1996, but was later renamed as Zhijiang Campus.

In 2002, Zeng Xianzi Teaching Building was built with the 4 million Hong Kong dollar donation from Hong Kong businessman Tsang Hin-chi. In 2006, the old buildings built by Hangchow University was listed as a Major Historical and Cultural Site Protected at the National Level by the State Council, with the name Former Site of Hangchow University. In 2007, a major renovation of the campus began.

== Architectural designs ==
The campus was built in Mount Qingwang upon the Qiantang River, with a total area of 650 mu and a total building area of 70,000 m^{2}. Characterised by redbrick buildings, the campus is considered one of the most beautiful university campuses in China. The campus is American styled, with campus buildings adopting both traditional Chinese and western architectural styles and a central garden where Sun Yat-sen made a public speech on 10 December 1912 during his visit to the university. Severance Hall used to have a Chinese-styled rooftop, which was replaced a hip roof in the 1946 renovation. The Paxton Residence and the North Pacific Residence are major residences in the campus, which are characterised by classical architectural features, including round arches, red brick exteriors and an arcade. The Tooker Memorial Chapel, a grey neo-Gothic building, was the only religious building in the campus. Zeng Xianzi Teaching Building, designed by the Architectural Design & Research Institute Of Zhejiang University (UAD), used similar red bricks as a major building materials, to mimic the styles of the historical buildings in the campus.

Original English name	Chinese names	Photo	Year of establishment	Notes
Severance Hall	主楼 (慎思堂)		1911	
Economics Building	经济学馆 (同怀堂、邓祖询纪念馆)	钟楼（同怀堂），1936年竣工落成	1936	Donated by Sze Yun-ken, a Hangchow alumni and the son of Sze Liang-tsai, a major Chinese journalist murdered by Chiang Kai-shek's henchmen. In Chinese, the building is also known as Deng Zuxun Memorial Hall. Deng Zuxun was a Hangchow student murdered in the same car when Sze Liang-tsai was murdered.
Alumni Library	图书馆	图书馆	1932	Now Guanghua Law School Library
Gamble Hall	1号楼 (东斋、甘卜堂)	1号楼	1911	Donated by the David B. Gamble family from Cincinnati, Ohio.
Wheeler and Dusenbury Hall	2号楼 (西斋、惠德堂、吴窦堂)	2号楼	1911	Formerly, boys' residential hall
Tooker Memorial Chapel	小礼堂 (育英堂、都克堂)	小礼堂	1919	Donated by the Nathaniel Tooker family from East Orange, New Jersey, United States. Designed by J. W. Wilson.
Converse Residence	灰房 (康沃斯楼)		1911	Formerly, foreign professors' residence
North Pacific Residence	上红房 (北太平洋楼)		1911	Formerly, residence of the president
Paxton Residence	下红房 (帕斯顿楼)		1911	Formerly, foreign professors' residence
Judson Science Hall	4号楼 (裘德生科学馆)		1932	Named after Rev. J. H. Judson, the president of Hangchow Presbyterian College
Wilson Hall	6号楼 (佩韦斋、韦斋)		1926	Formerly, foreign professors' and girls' residence
Wheeler Residence	9号楼 (维勒邦格楼、绿房)		1920	Formerly, foreign professors' and girls' residence
Materials Testing Laboratory	5号楼 (材料试验所)	5号楼，建于1935年	1935	Now part of Guanghua Law School Library
Carter Memorial Residence	白房		1920	
Engineering Hall	工程馆		1951	
Residence of Affiliated Primary School	附属小学宿舍		1931	Now residence of faculty
Gym Office	体育办公室		1934	
Student Service Center	学生服务部			
	后六号楼			
Chinese Professors' Homes	中方教授宿舍		1915	Formerly, homes to three Chinese professors
Philadelphia Observatory	费城观象台		1913	Donated by Mrs. Charles P. Turner. Destroyed in 1937 due to Japanese bombing.

== Institutions ==
- Faculty of Social Sciences:
  - Guanghua Law School
- Institute for Advanced Study in Humanities and Social Sciences

== In popular culture ==
- The 2010 movie Aftershock was shot on location within the campus to mimic a Chinese university life in the 1980s. Hangzhou Medical School, where the heroine of the movie, played by Zhang Jingchu, studies, was filmed on the campus, which made the Economics Building of the campus a popular tourist attraction.
- The 2015 movie The Left Ear was filmed on the campus.
- Janet Fitch wrote an autobiography which describes her life in the campus from 1909 to 1935.

== See also ==
- Hangchow University
- Zhejiang University
