= Hangchow University =

Defunct university in Hangzhou, China

- 之江大學
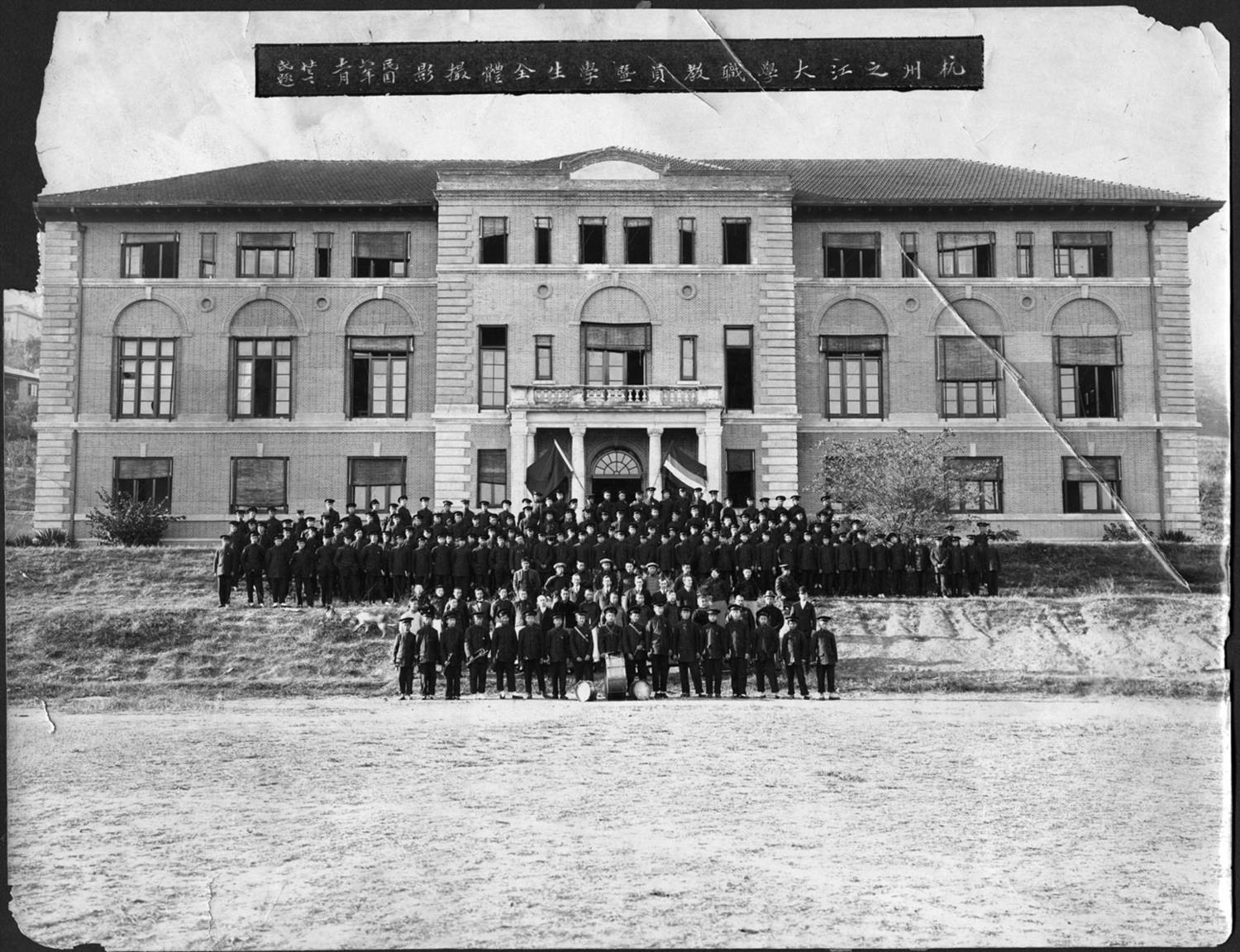
- Student, faculty and alumni of Hangchow College in November 1917
- Former names: Hangchow College; Hangchow Christian College; Hangchow Presbyterian College; Hangchow Presbyterian Boys' School; Ningpo Boys' Boarding School
- Motto: Truth, Love
- Type: Private, Missionary
- Active: July 1845–June 1952
- Religious affiliation: Presbyterian Church in the United States of America (later joined by Presbyterian Church in the United States)
- Location: Zhakou, Zhejiang, China; 30°11′41″N 120°07′16″E
- Campus: 43.33 hectares (107.1 acres)
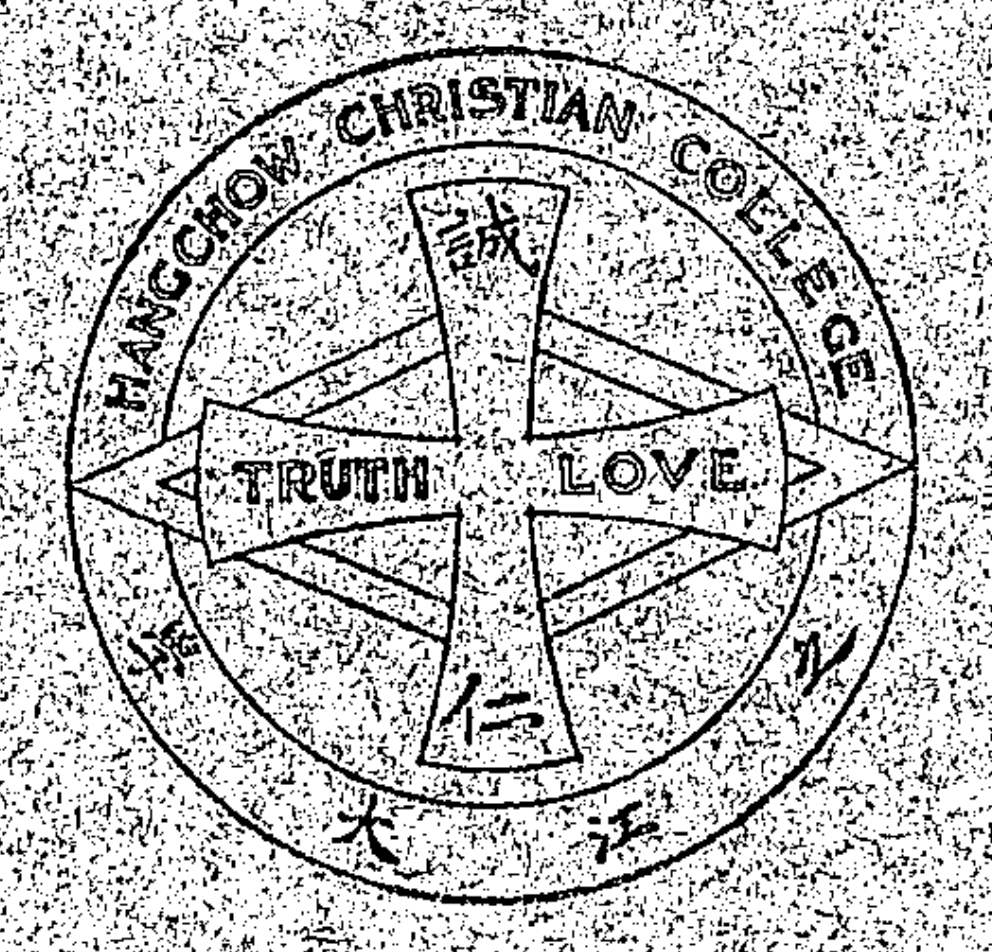

Ningpo Boys' Boarding School
- Traditional Chinese: 崇信义塾
- Simplified Chinese: 崇信義塾
- Literal meaning: Worship Honesty Public School
Transcriptions
Standard Mandarin
- Hanyu Pinyin: Chóngxìn Yìshú

Ningpo Girls' Boarding School
- Traditional Chinese: 寧波女塾
- Simplified Chinese: 宁波女塾
- Literal meaning: Ningbo Girls' School
Transcriptions
Standard Mandarin
- Hanyu Pinyin: Níngbō Nǚshú

Hangchow Presbyterian Boys' School
- Traditional Chinese: 育英義塾
- Simplified Chinese: 育英义塾
- Literal meaning: Nurture Elite Public School
Transcriptions
Standard Mandarin
- Hanyu Pinyin: Yùyīng Yìshú

Hangchow Presbyterian College
- Traditional Chinese: 育英書院
- Simplified Chinese: 育英书院
- Literal meaning: Nurture Elite College
Transcriptions
Standard Mandarin
- Hanyu Pinyin: Yùyīng Shūyuàn

Hangchow University (traditional Chinese: 之江大學; simplified Chinese: 之江大学), also spelled as Zhijiang University and formerly known as Hangchow Christian College, Hangchow College, and Hangchow Presbyterian College, is a defunct Protestant missionary university in China, which is one of the predecessors of Zhejiang University. Founded as the Ningpo Boys' Boarding School by Divie Bethune McCartee and colleagues of Northern Presbyterian Church in Ningbo in 1845, the university was one of the oldest missionary schools in China before it was shut down in 1952. The university was merged into Zhejiang University and other universities in China. Its campus was taken over by Zhejiang University as its Zhijiang Campus in 1961, which became a major nationally protected historic site in 2006.

== History ==
=== As a middle school ===
Hangchow University
- Traditional Chinese: 之江大學
- Simplified Chinese: 之江大学
- Literal meaning: Hangchow River University
Transcriptions
Standard Mandarin
- Hanyu Pinyin: Zhījiāng Dàxué

Alternative Chinese name
- Traditional Chinese: 私立之江文理學院
- Simplified Chinese: 私立之江文理学院
- Literal meaning: Private Hangchow River College of Humanities and Sciences
Transcriptions
Standard Mandarin
- Hanyu Pinyin: Zhījiāng Wénlǐ Xuéyuàn

In 1845, the American missionary Divie Bethune McCartee founded Ningpo Boys' Boarding School, also known as Ningpo Boys' Academy, in Ningbo (then romanized as Ningpo), one of the first treaty ports in China. Aiming to influence local Chinese with Christianity and making them assist the mission, the school provided training in religion, geography, history, mathematics, science, language, and arts and crafts and recruited up to 30 students a year. In 1846, a girls' boarding school was founded by Caroline Hubble Cole, which functioned as a place for missionary wives to serve. In 1847, when Mary Ann Aldersey left Ningbo, her girls' boarding school was merged into that of the church at her request. The Ningpo Girls' Boarding School founded by Aldersey was the first girls' high school in China. With the land lease in Ningbo due in 1867, the boys' school moved to Hangzhou (then romanized as Hangchow), the capital of Zhejiang, and was renamed as Hangchow Presbyterian Boys' School.

=== As a university ===
In 1897, the school opened courses for higher education, and became a college, named Hangchow Presbyterian College (simplified Chinese: 育英书院; traditional Chinese: 育英書院). In 1911, the college moved to Qinwang Hill outside the city of Hangzhou, now known as the Zhijiang Campus. In 1914, it was renamed to Hangchow Christian College. In Chinese, it was called Zhijiang University (simplified Chinese: 之江大学; traditional Chinese: 之江大學). Zhijiang literally means "the river" or "this river", and refers to Qiantang River that the campus borders. According to Junius Herbert Judson, who founded the college, the college was named so in Chinese as it provided a bird's-eye view of the Qiantang River from its location.

During the Northern Expedition, the college ceased operating for a while. With the foundation of the new Nationalist government after the expedition, the college resumed operations in 1931, and was registered as the Private Hangchow College of Sciences and Humanities in Chinese, because the college only had two branches, the sciences branch and the humanities branch. In English, it was called Hangchow Christian College and later, Hangchow College.

=== Wartime relocation ===
As the Second Sino-Japanese War broke out, the college moved from Hangzhou to Tunxi, Anhui in November 1937. However, as Guangde and neighbouring areas fell to the Japanese, the autumn term was forced to end in December, as defeated Chinese soldiers crowded into the town of Tengchi. The college resumed operation in the spring term of 1938 in cooperation with the University of Shanghai, St. John's University, and other refugee Christian colleges in Shanghai as the Associated Christian Colleges. During the time, the college developed into a university with an arts college, a College of Business, and an Engineering College.

With the outbreak of the Pacific War, the Shanghai International Settlement fell to the Japanese in December 1941. The university moved to Shaowu, Fujian (Fukien), on the campus of Fukien Christian University in autumn 1942. The university opened its Engineering College in Guiyang in autumn 1943 on the wartime campus of the Great China University. The Shaowu campus was closed in June 1944 due to further Japanese invasion nearby, with its students transferred to Amoy University in Tingzhou. Due to further Japanese invasion near Guiyang in December 1944, the engineering college was again dismissed, until it reopened in Chongqing, then auxiliary capital of China, as part of an associated university with Soochow University School of Law and University of Shanghai Business School. With the Japanese surrender in August 1945, the associated university continued its work until the end of spring term in 1946.

Meanwhile, as not all students retreated to the inland, the university continued to offer courses in Shanghai. In autumn 1943, a number of Hangchow faculty who remained in Shanghai formed East China University in cooperation with Soochow University faculty in Shanghai, which was further joined by St. John's University and was renamed as East China Union University in spring 1945.

=== Post-war period ===
With the Japanese surrender in August 1945, East China Union University was closed, leading to an reopening of Hangchow University in Shanghai. The university raised funds and restored the war-torn Zhakou campus, which allowed it to reopen at this campus in spring 1946. On Christmas of 1946, the university celebrated its 100th anniversary in Hangzhou. In July 1948, the university status became recognised by the government. As a result, the university recovered its Chinese name, Zhijiang University, used from 1911 to 1931. However, with continuous Kuomintang defeats in the civil war with the Communists, the American faculty left the university by the end of 1948.

On 3 May 1949, the People's Liberation Army defeated Kuomintang troops on the north bank of the Qiantang River, thus entering the campus of Hangchow University, which was welcomed by many of the students and faculty. On the following day, Hangchow students came to the campus of Zhejiang University to celebrate the anniversary of the May Fourth Movement and the Communist control of the city. President Baen Lee resigned from his position and left the university on the same day. Historian Lin Handa was invited by the students to serve as the new president, which was declined. In July, Li Zhaohuan was elected as the president by the university committee.

During the nationwide university and college reorganisation in 1952, the university was closed in January, with its mechanical and civil engineering departments merged into Zhejiang University. Its college of arts and sciences merged with the School of Humanities, Zhejiang University, to form Zhejiang Teachers College. The School of Finance and Economics of Hangchow University gained independence as the Zhejiang College of Finance and Economics, which was later merged into Shanghai College of Finance and Economics in August.

== Campuses ==
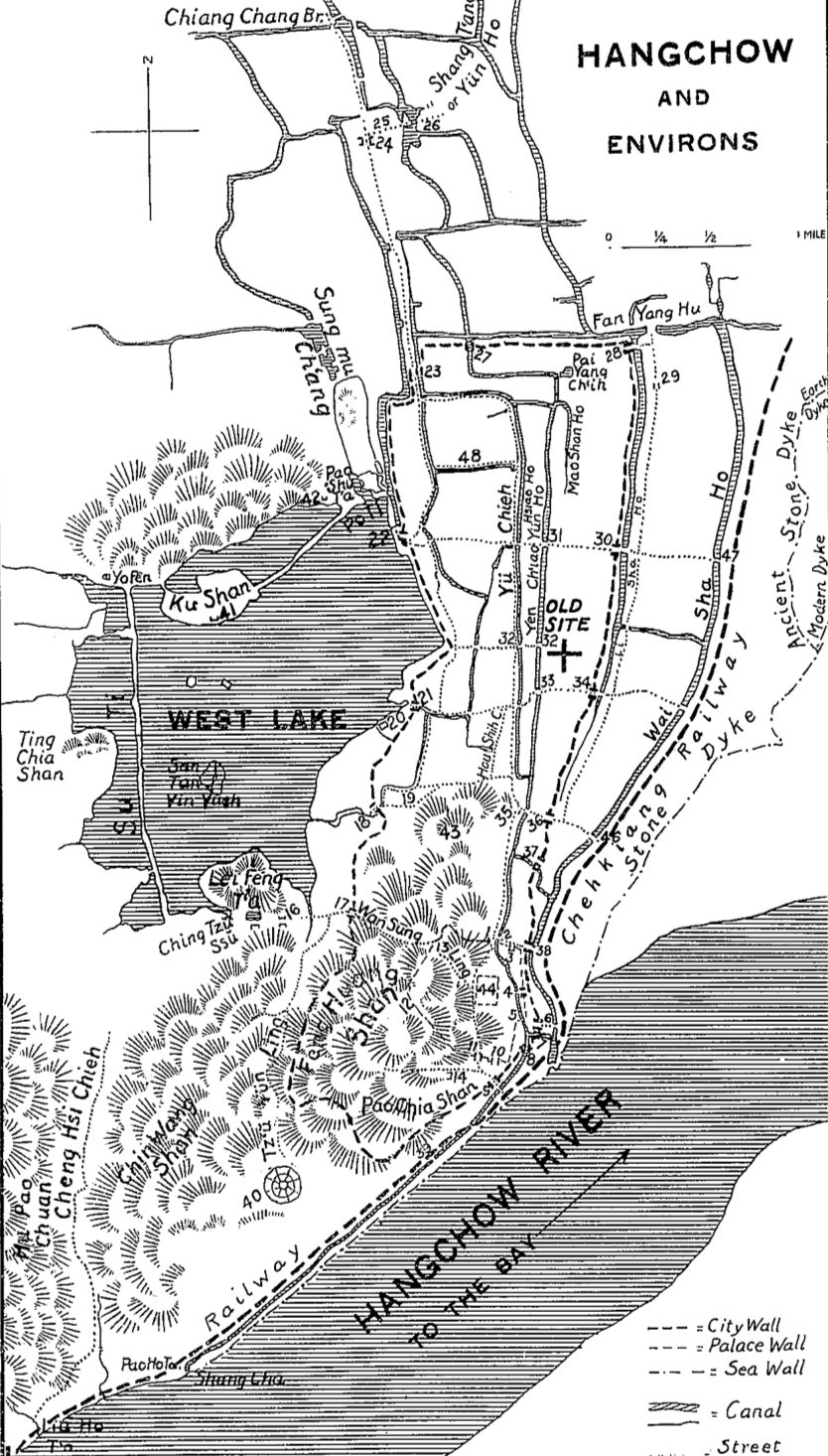
Location of the old campus in the city centre of Hangzhou

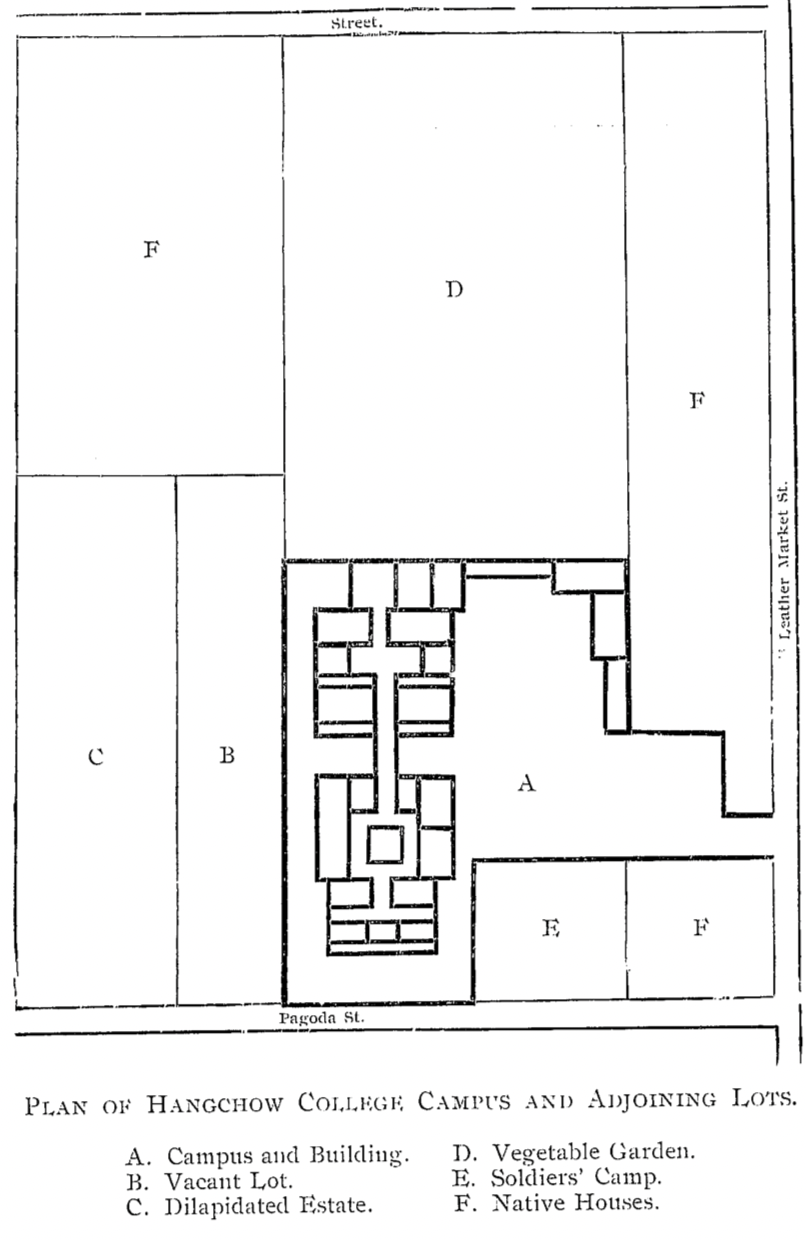
Plan of Hangchow College campus and adjoining Lots in 1905

=== Before 1906 ===
Founded in Ningbo as a middle school, the campus of Ningpo Boys' Boarding School was located at North Bank, Ningbo, for which the accommodation was near the Oil Mill Bridge. In 1867, the school, renamed as Hangchow Presbyterian Boys' School, later known as Hangchow Presbyterian College in 1897, moved to the Hangzhou campus at Leather Market Street (皮市巷) and later was relocated at Pagoda Street (大塔儿巷) next to Pishi Lane in the city centre of Hangzhou.

=== Zhakou, Hangzhou ===
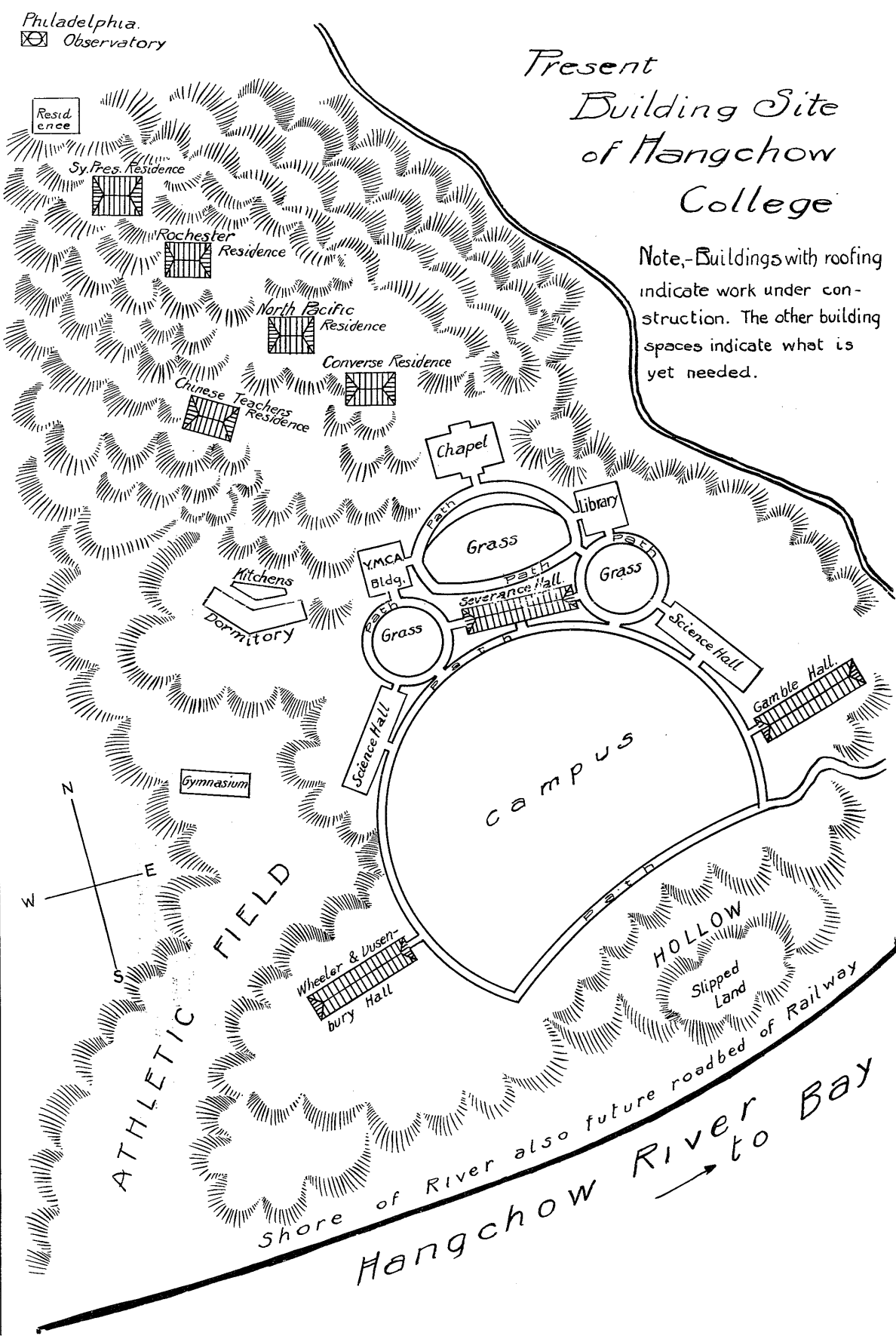
Map of Zhakou Campus in 1911

Since 1906, a new campus was proposed by the board of directors of Hangchow Presbyterian College. Located at Zhakou (闸口; Zakow), Zhejiang, the new campus was to the west of Zhakou station (闸口火车站), which was the western terminal of trains from Shanghai before the Qiantang River Bridge was built. From 1906 to 1911, the college acquired land on Qinwang Hill (秦望山) near Zhakou to build its new campus. The campus was a special combination of both the Western and Chinese architectural styles, with new buildings continued to be built while the university remained on the campus. The campus is now used by Zhejiang University and has become a major nationally protected historic site since 2006.

=== Wartime relocation ===
During the Second Sino-Japanese War, the university left the campus and fled to Tunxi, Shanghai, Shaowu, Guiyang, and Chongqing, successively, during which the college developed into a university with multiple colleges. When the university returned to the Zhakou campus in 1946, it renovated the campus and continued on the campus until it was closed down in 1952.

== Notable people ==
=== Alumni ===
- Chen Congzhou (simplified Chinese: 陈从周; traditional Chinese: 陳從周; pinyin: Chén Cóngzhōu; born 1918) architect.
- Jin Zhonghua (simplified Chinese: 金仲华; traditional Chinese: 金仲華; pinyin: Jīn Zhònghuá), politician.
- Joseph T. Ling (Lin Zuodi) (Chinese: 林作砥), member of the US National Academy of Engineering.
- Mei Shaowu, translator.
- Qi Jun (Chinese: 琦君; pinyin: Qí Jūn; 1917 - 2006), writer.
- Yang Sixin (simplified Chinese: 杨嗣信; traditional Chinese: 楊嗣信; pinyin: Yáng Sìxīn; born 1930) architect.
- Zhang Wencai (Chinese: 章文才; pinyin: Zhāng Wéncaí), biologist.
- Zhu Shenghao, translator.

=== Presidents ===
- Rev, Junius Herbert Judson (Chinese: 裘德生; pinyin: Qiú Déshēng), President of Hangchow Presbyterian College
- Elmer L. Mattox (simplified Chinese: 王令庚; traditional Chinese: 王令賡; pinyin: Wáng Lìnggēng), President of Hangchow Christian College, 1914 to 1916.
- Warren Horton Stuart (simplified Chinese: 司徒华林; traditional Chinese: 司徒華林; pinyin: Sītú Huálín), President of Hangchow Christian College, 1916 to 1922.
- Robert Ferris Fitch (simplified Chinese: 费佩德; traditional Chinese: 費佩德; pinyin: Fèi Pèidé), President of Hangchow Christian College, 1922 to 1931.
- Baen E. Lee (Chinese: 李培恩; pinyin: Lǐ Peí'ēn), President of Hangchow University, 1931 to 1949, the first Chinese president.
- Li Zhaohuan, President of Hangchow University 1949 to 1952.

== Legacy ==
The university was merged into Zhejiang University in 1952. The campus of the university became the Zhijiang Campus of Zhejiang University in 1958. The former site of Hangchow University was made a Major Historical and Cultural Site Protected at the National Level in 2006.

The board of the former Hangchow University, along with other Christian universities in China, founded Chung Chi College in Hong Kong in 1951 as a continuation of the tradition of Chinese Christian universities. The college later became part of the Chinese University of Hong Kong in 1963. The seals of 13 former Chinese Christian universities were hung above the two sides of the altar of the Chung Chi College Chaplaincy, which is the only place to see them, including the seal of Hangchow University, in China.

== See also ==
- Hangzhou University and Zhejiang University
- List of Christian colleges in China
- United Board for Christian Higher Education in Asia
