= United Board for Christian Higher Education in Asia =

Non-profit organization in the USA

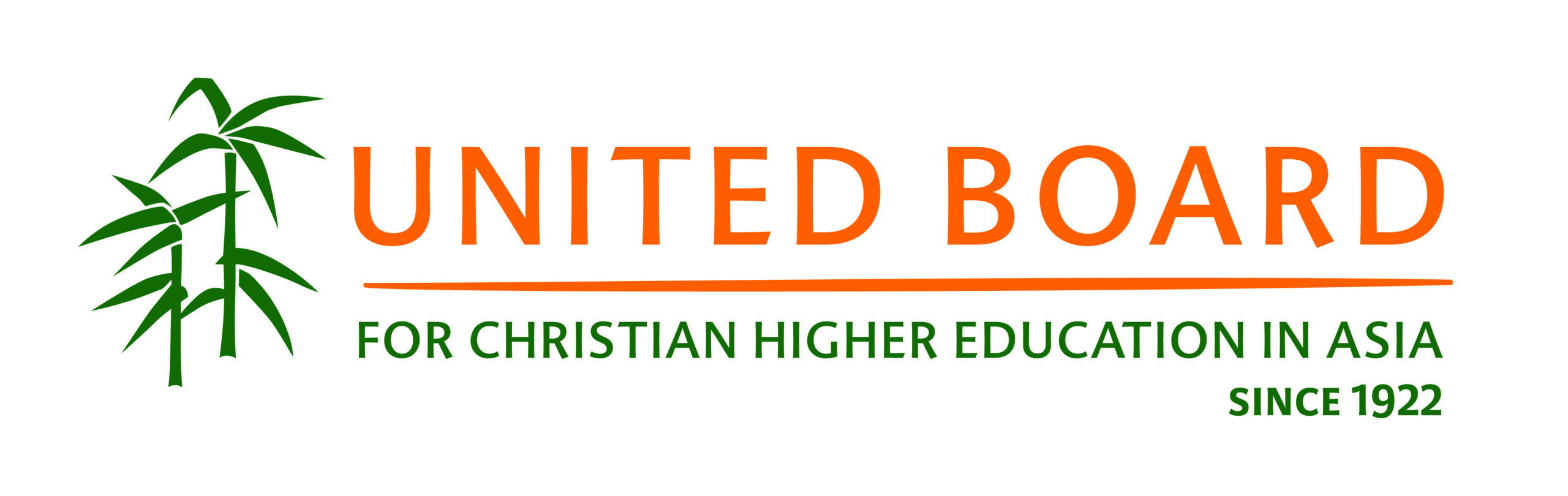
- Formation: 1922
- Type: Nongovernmental Organization
- Headquarters: New York Office 475 Riverside Drive, Suite 1221 New York, NY 10115 U.S.A.; Hong Kong Office 1/F, Chung Chi College Administration Building The Chinese University of Hong Kong Shatin, New Territories Hong Kong
- Location: United States, Hong Kong
- Region served: Asia
- President: Pareena Gupta Lawrence, PhD
- Executive Vice President: Ricky M. Cheng
- Website: https://unitedboard.org/

The United Board for Christian Higher Education in Asia (also known simply as the "United Board") is an organization founded in 1922 that supports whole person education in colleges and universities in Asia. The Board is a 501(c)(3) organization incorporated in the State of New York, and is also a registered charity in Hong Kong. It collaborates with higher education institutions in 15 countries and regions of Asia, both conducting program, and making grants. It began its work in China.

== History ==
The organization was established as the "Central Office of the China Union Universities" in New York City in 1922 to coordinate administrative and financial work of the North American boards of trustees of several Protestant Christian colleges in China. On May 18, 1945, the Regents of the University of the State of New York issued a charter consolidating several existing colleges and universities into a new corporation with the name "United Board for Christian Colleges in China"; by the end of the 1940s, the organization was working with thirteen Protestant Christian colleges in China: Fukien Christian University, Ginling College, Hangchow University, Huachung University, Hwa Nan College, Lingnan University, Nanking University, St. John's University, Shanghai, University of Shanghai, Shantung Christian University, Soochow University, West China Union University, and Yenching University.

When the Chinese Communist Revolution left the Board unable to continue work in China after 1951, the organization devoted its activities to other areas, supporting Tunghai University in Taiwan and Chung Chi College in Hong Kong. It provided assistance to International Christian University in Japan, Yonsei University in Korea, and Silliman University in the Philippines. In the 1970s, it began work with institutions in Thailand, Indonesia, India, and several other countries, and changed its name to the present United Board for Christian Higher Education in Asia.

When diplomatic relations between the United States and China resumed, the organization was invited to return to China in 1980. In the 1990s, it established relationships with institutions in Vietnam, Cambodia, and Myanmar, and in the 2000s with institutions in Timor Leste, Macau, and Sri Lanka. The organization now works with both Christian and secular higher education institutions.

== Faculty and Leadership Development Programs ==
The United Board provides scholarships, fellowships, conferences and networking opportunities for faculty and administrators. Its programs include its Asian University Leaders Program, United Board Fellows Program, Faculty Scholarship Program, and Institute for Advanced Study in Asian Cultures and Theologies.
