= Li Zhaohuan =

Chinese educator, politician and banker

- 黎照寰
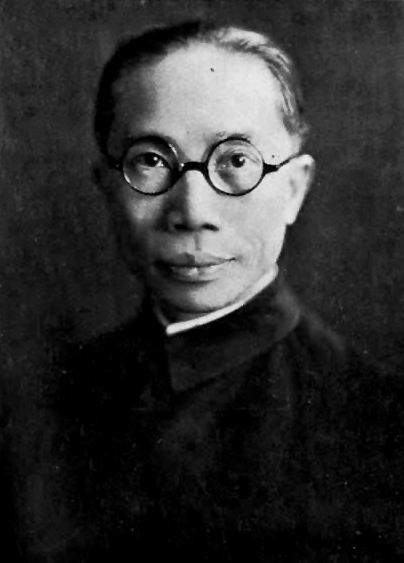

Personal details
- Born: 1888 Namhoi, Guangdong, Qing Dynasty
- Died: 16 September 1968 (aged 79–80) Shanghai, People's Republic of China
Li Zhaohuan
- Chinese: 黎照寰
Transcriptions
Standard Mandarin
- Hanyu Pinyin: Lí Zhàohuán
- Wade–Giles: Li^{2} Chao^{4}-huan^{2}
Yue: Cantonese
- Jyutping: Lai^{4} Ziu^{3}-waan^{4}
Courtesy name
- Chinese: 曜生
Transcriptions
Standard Mandarin
- Hanyu Pinyin: Yào Shēng
- Wade–Giles: Yao^{4} Shêng^{1}
Yue: Cantonese
- Jyutping: Jiu^{6} Sang^{1}

Li Zhaohuan (Chinese: 黎照寰; pinyin: Lí Zhàohuán; Wade–Giles: Li Chao-huan; 1888–1968), also known as Juwan Usang Ly, was a Chinese educator, politician and banker. He served as President of National Chiao Tung University (now Shanghai Jiao Tong University) and the last President of Hangchow University.

== Biography ==
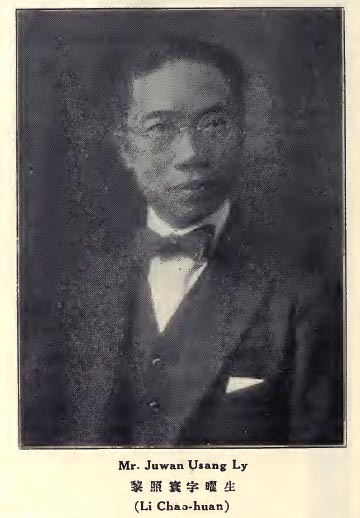
Li Zhaohuan in Who's Who of China

Li was born in Nanhai County, Guangdong Province in 1898. Li's courtesy name was Yaosheng (曜生, also spelled Usang).

Li studied in the United States. He obtained BA in economics from Columbia University, and MA in politics from the University of Pennsylvania.

Li became a member of Tongmenghui. Li was the general manager of the Hong Kong Industrial Bank (香港工商银行) and Chinese Merchants Bank (华商银行). Li was the director of the Guangzhou-Kowloon Railway Administration Bureau. Li was a professor of several notable universities, including Chiao Tung University (current mainly Shanghai Jiao Tong University in Shanghai, Xi'an Jiaotong University in Xi'an, and National Chiao Tung University in Hsinchu, Taiwan), St. John's University, the University of Shanghai (different from current Shanghai University). Li was pointed the Vice-president of Chiao Tung University in June 1929. In October 1930, Li became President of Chiao Tung University. Li served for Chiao Tung University for 12 years.

Li was a counselor for the Minister of Finance of the Republic of China, and the Vice-minister of the Ministry of Railway of ROC. October 1927, Li was pointed the Vice-governor of the National Central Bank of ROC.

After 1949, Li was a professor and the last President of Hangchow University (a predecessor of Zhejiang University).

Li was a Vice-chairman of the first to fourth Shanghai People's Political Consultative Conference.

On 16 September 1968, Li died in Shanghai.
