= List of Christian colleges in China =

The following colleges and universities were founded by Christian organisations. The list covers universities and colleges that were founded in the then British crown colony of Hong Kong and the Portuguese overseas province of Macau. It also covers universities and colleges that were founded in mainland China but were later moved to or reestablished in Taiwan.

== Colleges and universities ==
=== Existing ===
- Anglo-Chinese College, Xiamen
- Anglo-Chinese College, Fuzhou
- Anglo-Chinese College, Tinkling
- Anglo-Chinese College, Shanghai
- Anglo-Chinese College, Shantou
- Anglo-Chinese College, Tianjin
- Aletheia University
- Chang Jung Christian University
- Chung Chi College, The Chinese University of Hong Kong
- Chung Yuan Christian University
- Fu Jen Academy, later Catholic University of Peking, now Fu Jen Catholic University
- Hong Kong Baptist University
- Kung Hong School
- Lingnan University
- St. Mark's Anglo-Chinese College
- St. John's College, The University of Hong Kong
- Tunghai University
- Soochow University, Suzhou
- Talmage College
- St. John's University (Taiwan)
- Ying Wa College
- Peking Union Medical College

=== Defunct ===
- Boone College and University, Wuchang, Hubei
- Canton Christian College
- Central China University
- Effie Sears School for Girls (1890) Pingdu
- English Methodist College, Ningbo
- Foochow College, Fuzhou
- Foochow Girls College, Fuzhou
- Fukien Christian University, merged with the Fujian Superior Normal School in 1953 to become the Fujian Techer's College, now Fujian Normal School
- Ginling College, Nanjing
- Hangchow University, alternatively known as Hangchow Christian College, Hangzhou
- Hwa Nan College, Fuzhou (later Nanjing)
- John Carter School for Girls; later part of North China Baptist College, Longkou
- Griffith John College, Hankou
- Manchuria Mission College, Shenyang
- Medhurst College, Shanghai
- Mukden Medical College, Shenyang
- Nanking Union University
- North China Baptist College, Longkou
- North China Union College
- Pingtu Institute for Boys (1890), Pingdu
- Providence University
- St. John's University, Shanghai
- Shaluet College, Shantou
- Shanghai Baptist College, now Shanghai University
- Shantung Christian University, Union Medical College, Jinan
- Shantung Christian College, Jinan
- Training School for Bible Women (1901), Lanzhou
- University of Nanking, Nanjing
- West China Union University, Chengdu (1896, founded by Joseph Beech, O. L. Kilborn and R. T. Davidson)
- Williams Memorial School for Girls (1906), Yantai
- Yenching University, Beijing

== Theological colleges and seminaries ==
- Anhui Seminary, Anhui
- Ashmore Theological Seminary, Shantou
- Bush Theological Seminary (1885) later part of North China Baptist College Longkou
- East China Theological College
- Fujian Theological College
- Guangdong Union Theological College
- Hunan Bible Institute
- Mukden (Presbyterian) Theological College, Shenyang
- Nanjing Union Theological Seminary
- North China Union College of Theology
- North China Theological Seminary
- North East Theological College
- Shaanxi Bible College
- Shandong Theological College
- Shantung Christian University, Theological College, Qingzhou
- Shanghai Baptist Theological Seminary
- Sichuan Theological College
- Yanjing Union Theological College
- Yunnan Theological College
- Zhejiang Theological College
- Zhong Nan Theological Seminary
