= Hwa Nan College =

College

Coordinates: 26°2′32.45″N 119°18′8.69″E

- 华南女子大学
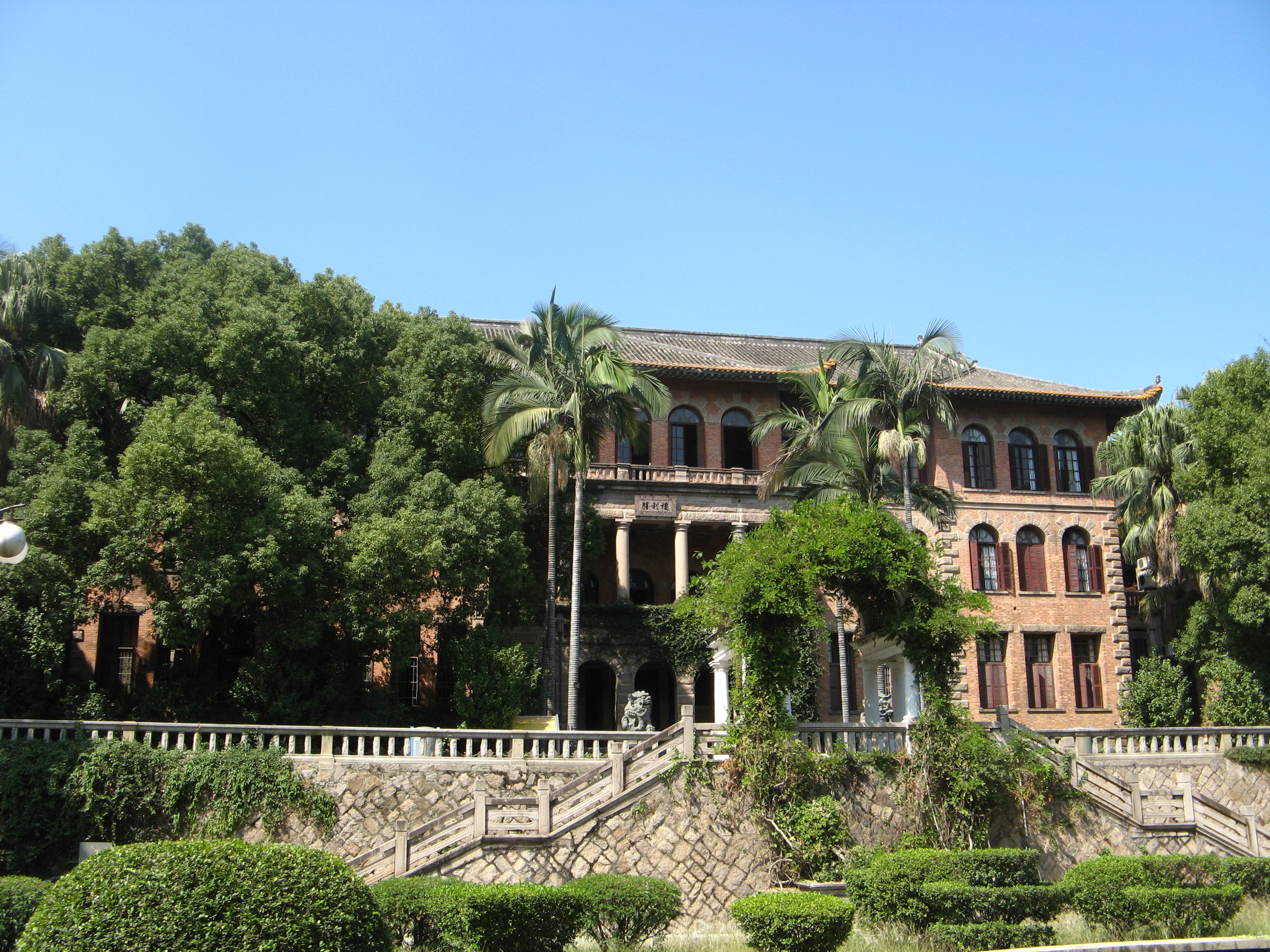
- Other name: Women's College of South China
- Type: women's
- Active: 1908–1951
- Religious affiliation: The Methodist Episcopal Church
- Chairman: Dr James W. Bashford
- Principal: Lydia A Trimble
- Location: Cangqian Mountain, Fuzhou, Fujian, China
- Campus: 6.6 acres (2.7 ha)
- Language: English

Hwa Nan College, or Women's College of South China, was a Christian institution of higher education founded by the Methodist Episcopal Church (Chinese: 美以美会, known as卫理公会 after 1939). It is located on the mountainside of Cangqian Mountain (Chinese: 仓前山), now Cangshan District (Chinese: 仓山区), Fuzhou City, Fujian Province, China. From 1938 to 1946, the college was temporarily relocated to Nanping City, due to Second Sino-Japanese War. Now the college belongs to the Cangshan Campus of Fujian Normal University (Chinese: 福建师范大学).

== History ==
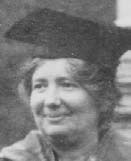
Lydia A. Trimble - the first principal of Hwa Nan College

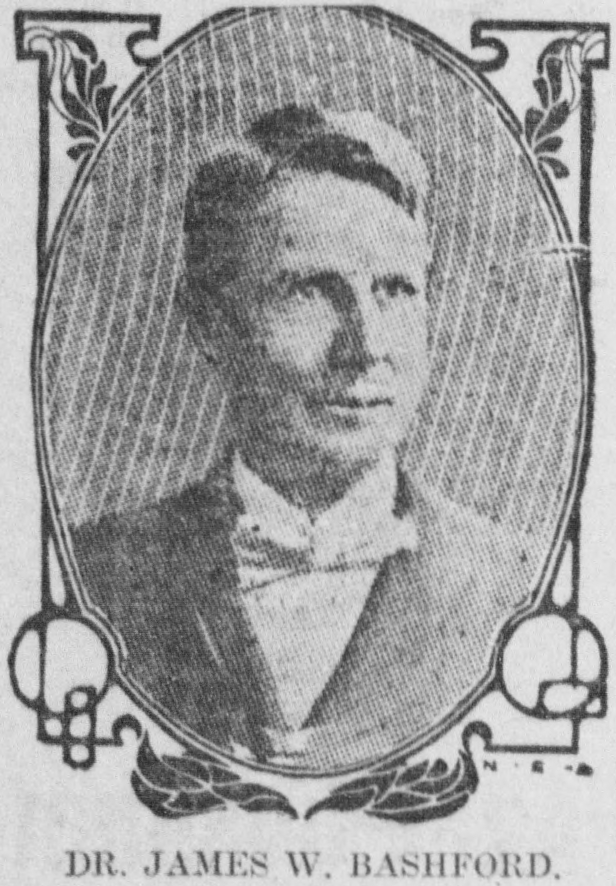
James W. Bashford - the first resident bishop of the Methodist Episcopal Church in China

In May 1904, at the Annual Meeting of The Methodist Episcopal Church held in Los Angeles, Lydia A. Trimble (Chinese name: 程吕底亚) of the Woman's Foreign Missionary Society called for the establishment of a women's university in Fuzhou. Lydia A. Trimble was sent to China as a missionary in 1890. After she found that only boys can receive formal education, she decided to start an educational institution for women. Once this application was approved partly by the conference, a women's preparatory school was established without a certain place. A committee was formed by Lydia A. Trimble and two other women missionaries, with a bishop Dr. James W. Bashford (Chinese name: 柏锡福), who had served as president of Ohio Wesleyan University for many years, as the first chairman of the College Board of Directors.

In May 1905, the Methodist Episcopal Church Congress in Shanghai decided to establish the Foochow College Preparatory of Foochow Woman's College. After two years, Anglo-Chinese Girls' School (Chinese: 华英女子学堂) was established in Fuzhou. In January 1908, the school was finally being able to start teaching, and Lydia A. Trimble was appointed as its first headmaster. It became the only women's university in southern China at that time. In 1916, the school was renamed Hwa Nan College (Chinese: 华南女子大学). In 1922, the college was admitted by the University of the State of New York with a provisional charter. In 1933, the college changed its name to Woman's College Of South China (Chinese: 华南女子文理学院), which was approved by the Chinese Ministry of Education the following year. In 1935, the college became one of the thirteen Christian high education colleges and universities in China, and was charged by the board of trustees in America (Chinese: 美国托事部). The college was moved to Nanping City in June 1938 due to Second Sino-Japanese War and moved back to Fuzhou City in 1946. This move was led by the third principal, Lucy C. Wang (Chinese name: 王世静), who carried many books and supplies with the students by train and wagon. The college was abolished in April 1951, as merged with Fukien Christian University to form Fuzhou University.

== Principals ==
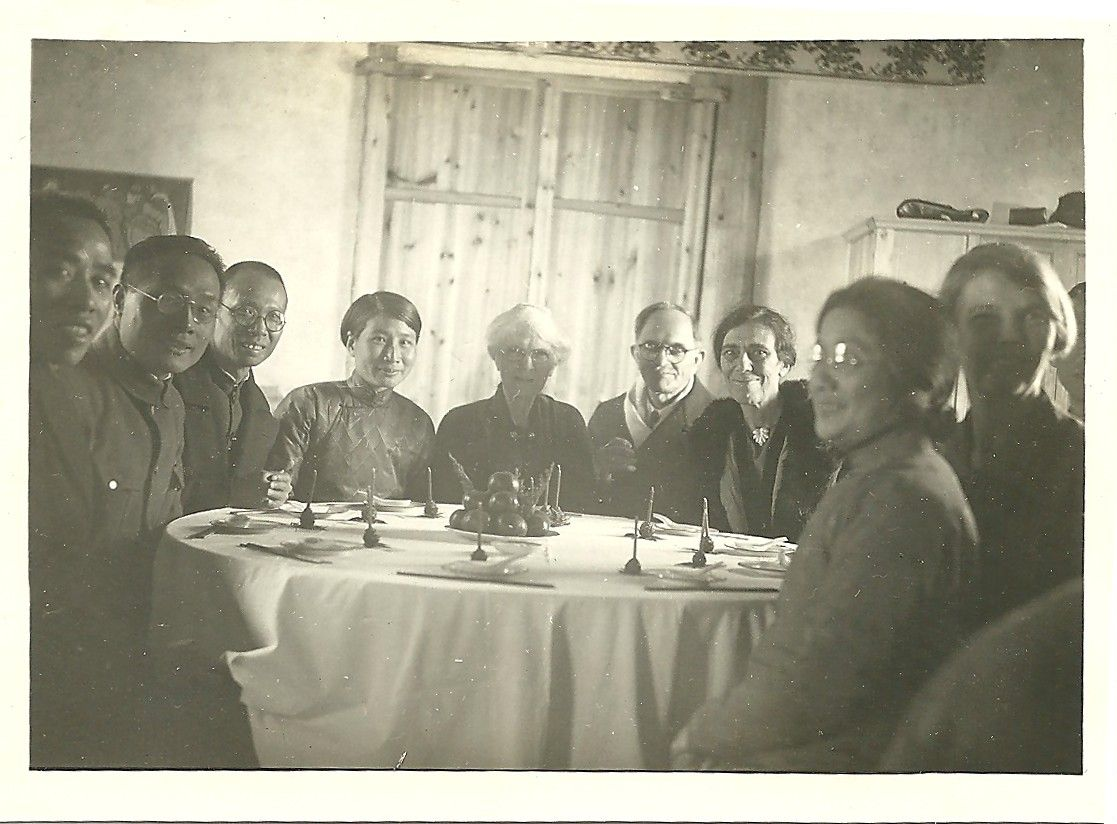
In 1938, 50th Anniv. of Ex-Pres. Lydia Trimble's arrival in China, Lucy Wang and Lydia Trimble sit fourth and fifth from the left.

Hua Ying Women's College

- 1908—1916 Lydia A. Trimble

Hwa Nan College

- 1916—1925 Lydia A. Trimble
- 1925—1927 Dr. Ida Belle Lewi (Chinese name: 卢爱德)
- 1928—1933 Lucy C. Wang

The Woman's College Of South China

- 1933—1951 Lucy C. Wang

== Founding ==
The founding of building and teaching activities of Hwa Nan College mainly came from Church grants and private donations. Including the Methodist Episcopal Church and Woman's Missionary Society, believers (Mr J. D. Payne, Mrs Laura Granson and others) and past alumni.

== Campus ==
Mallan Payne Hall
- Traditional Chinese: 彭氏楼
- Simplified Chinese: 彭氏樓
- Literal meaning: named after a donor
Transcriptions
Standard Mandarin
- Hanyu Pinyin: péng shì lóu

Granson Hall
- Traditional Chinese: 谷氏楼
- Simplified Chinese: 穀氏樓
- Literal meaning: named after a donor
Transcriptions
Standard Mandarin
- Hanyu Pinyin: gǔ shì lóu

Lydla A. Trlmble Hall
- Traditional Chinese: 程氏楼
- Simplified Chinese: 程氏樓
- Literal meaning: named after its first principal
Transcriptions
Standard Mandarin
- Hanyu Pinyin: chéng shì lóu

The foundation construction of Hwa Nan College was personally participated by the students, and finally it covered an area of about 3 hectares (7.4 acres). The main buildings and places include Mallan Payne Hall (Chinese: 彭氏楼), Granson Hall (Chinese: 谷氏楼) and Lydla A. Trlmble Hall (Chinese: 程氏楼), as well as libraries, science museums, auditoriums, tennis courts, basketball courts, etc. In January 2007, the college site was listed as the fourth batch of the Cultural Relics Protection Unit of Cangshan District. In January 2013, the college site was listed as the eighth batch of the Cultural Relics Protection Unit of Fujian.

== See also ==
- List of Christian colleges in China
- United Board for Christian Higher Education in Asia
