= Zhu Shenghao =

Chinese translator

Zhu Shenghao 朱生豪
- Born: Zhu Wensen (朱文森); February 2, 1912; Jiaxing, Zhejiang
- Died: December 26, 1944 (aged 32); Jiaxing, Zhejiang
- Education: Hangchow University
- Occupation: Translator
- Spouse: Song Qingru (宋清如)
- Writing career
- Pen name: Zhuzhu (朱朱); Zhusheng (朱生)
- Language: Chinese, English
- Period: 1933–1944
- Genre: Drama
- Notable work: Works of William Shakespeare

Zhu Shenghao (Chinese: 朱生豪; pinyin: Zhū Shēngháo) (February 2, 1912 – December 26, 1944) was a Chinese translator. Born in Jiaxing, Zhejiang of China, he was among the first few in China who translated the works of William Shakespeare's into Chinese language. His translations are well respected by domestic and overseas scholars.

He translated a total of 31 of Shakespearean plays, 27 of which were published before the founding of the People's Republic of China. Due to the Cultural Revolution starting from 1966 and other social turbulence around the 1950s, it was not until 1978 that Zhu's completed texts were finally published in Beijing. In order to adapt the plays to Chinese reading habits, Zhu did not adopt the chronological arrangement of the original Oxford Edition; instead, he divided these plays into four categories: comedy, tragedy, historical play, and miscellaneous. The first printing of Shakespeare's complete works in Chinese marks a significant event in the study of Shakespearean drama in China.

He was married to Song Qingru (Chinese: 宋清如) in Shanghai on May 1, 1942. He died on December 26, 1944, due to pulmonary tuberculosis, at the age of 32.

== His life ==
Zhu Shenghao and his wife Song Qingru

Zhu was born in a dilapidated merchant family on February 2, 1912. His father was Lu Yun, and his mother was Zhu Peixia. In 1917 he went to Jiaxing Enlightened Primary School and graduated in 1921, ranking the first in achievement. His mother died the winter of 1922, and his father in 1924. In 1929 he graduated from Xiuzhou Secondary School and was recommended by his high school principal to enter Zhijiang University in Hangzhou and received a scholarship.

When he was a sophomore at university, he joined the "River Poetry Society", where his talent was recognized. The president of the society, professor Xia Chengdao, commented in his book Diary of Learning Poetry at Wind Pavilion (天风阁学词日记), "In reading Zhu Shenghao's seven essays on the Tang dynasty poets, I found many opinions that had never been made before, with deep insight and incomparable sharpness. The talent and aptitude in him are between my teachers and my friends. I should not treat him as a student."

In 1933 Zhu graduated from Zhijiang University and worked as an English editor at Shanghai World Book Company, where he participated in the compilation of the English-Chinese Four-Use Dictionary. In the spring of 1935, impressed by his talent, Zhan Wenhu, Zhu's senior colleague at the Book Company, encouraged Zhu to translate Shakespeare. In 1936, at the age of twenty-three Zhu started translating The Tempest into Chinese, with the understanding that the World Book Company would publish his complete translations of Shakespearean plays.

The war with Japan, which broke out in 1937, disrupted many large projects, but Zhu Shenghao, literally gave his life to translating the complete plays of Shakespeare. Though the outbreak of the Sino-Japanese War shattered his translation schedule, Zhu never stopped working. His manuscripts were destroyed when he escaped from Japanese-occupied Shanghai. Zhu later returned to the Shanghai foreign concessions to resume his translation work, only to find himself on the run from the Japanese again with the outbreak of World War II, and his manuscripts were again destroyed. Zhu once mentioned, "Different versions of Shakespeare collection and a variety of notes, commentaries, research papers, and literary criticism that I collected all these years no less than one hundred copies have been destroyed by gunfire."

In a letter to his girlfriend Song Qingru who later became his wife, Zhu Shenghao wrote that working on The Tempest was so adsorbing that he failed to notice being bitten by bedbugs. Even the loss of his manuscripts twice over failed to dent his optimism: "I am very poor, but I have everything!" Qingru later reported he had said. His love letters to Qingru reveal a passionate personality. The letters address not only his personal life but also his professional aspirations as a poet and translator. Song, a poet of her own right and a modern woman who refused an arranged marriage and decided to use her dowry to pay for her university tuition, understood him well; as a result, Zhu felt no hesitation in confessing to her his sadness, joy, frustration, satisfaction, ideas, and preferences.

On May 1, 1942, Zhu married his university alumna Song Qingru and held their wedding in Shanghai. In June they went to Changshu and lived with Zhu's mother-in-law, where he finished retranslating all the lost manuscripts. In January 1943, the couple moved to Jiaxing and settled down, where Romeo and Juliet, King Lear, and Hamlet were translated. In the autumn of the same year, Zhu's health suffered a decline. In failing health and stricken circumstances, he worked on his translations of Shakespeare until his death in December 1944. He translated a total of thirty-one plays, all of which were published posthumously.

== His View ==
While many critics and readers regard Zhu Shenghao's translations of Shakespeare as classics in their own right, others have criticized certain omissions of obscene language in Zhu's rendering.

In terms of his own treatment in Shakespearean translation, Zhu explained, "I translate these works according to the following principles: first of all, I have tried as much as possible to capture the original appeal. Then, if I have no other choice, I look for clear and fluent expressions to preserve the charm of the original. But I do not agree with the rigid method of word-for-word translation. Whenever I run into something incompatible with Chinese grammar, I repeatedly and carefully go through the original words, sparing no effort to change entire sentence structures in order to make the original meaning as clear as the daylight, free from any obscure expressions. When I finish a paragraph, I transform myself into a reader, to examine if there is anything obscure." Meanwhile, he also kept in mind an imaginary stage: "I would also play the role of an actor on stage in order to detect whether the intonation was fluent or whether the rhythm was in harmony. If I was not satisfied with one word or one sentence, I often spent several days continually thinking about it."

Before Zhu Shenghao started working on Shakespeare in 1935, a number of famous authors, including Liang Shiqiu (also known as Liang Shih-chiu), had already published translations. After having looked at them carefully, Zhu concluded: "Chinese readers have heard of Shakespeare for a long time. Well-known writers also tried to publish their translations. But as I looked at the different translations available, I found a few of them to be rough and hasty, although most of them are too overcautious and rigid. Because of this rigidity, not only is the original allure completely lost but also the language is so obscure that it becomes almost unintelligible. It is impossible to grasp the meaning quickly. We cannot blame Shakespeare for this shortcoming; his translators are the ones responsible for this"

For the reason why he had a keen enthusiasm in translating Shakespeare, Zhu Shenghao wrote in the preface to his translations of Shakespeare, "In the history of world literature, only four authors, Homer of ancient Greece, Dante of Italy, Shakespeare of England, and Goethe of Germany, have transcended temporal and spatial limits. They are great masters and crowned kings of the poetic world. . . . But in terms of transcending temporal and spatial limits, Shakespeare surpasses by far the other three. Although most characters created by Shakespeare belonged to an aristocracy of the past, what he tried to penetrate was the human nature shared by all, be they ancient or modern, Chinese or foreign, aristocrat or commoner, rich or poor. Thus, after three centuries, not only are his works read assiduously by admirers of literature but his plays also continue to attract large audiences on the stage and on the screen in different countries. Because his works are eternal and universal, they still touch people's hearts deeply."
