= Puyang River =

River in Zhejiang, China

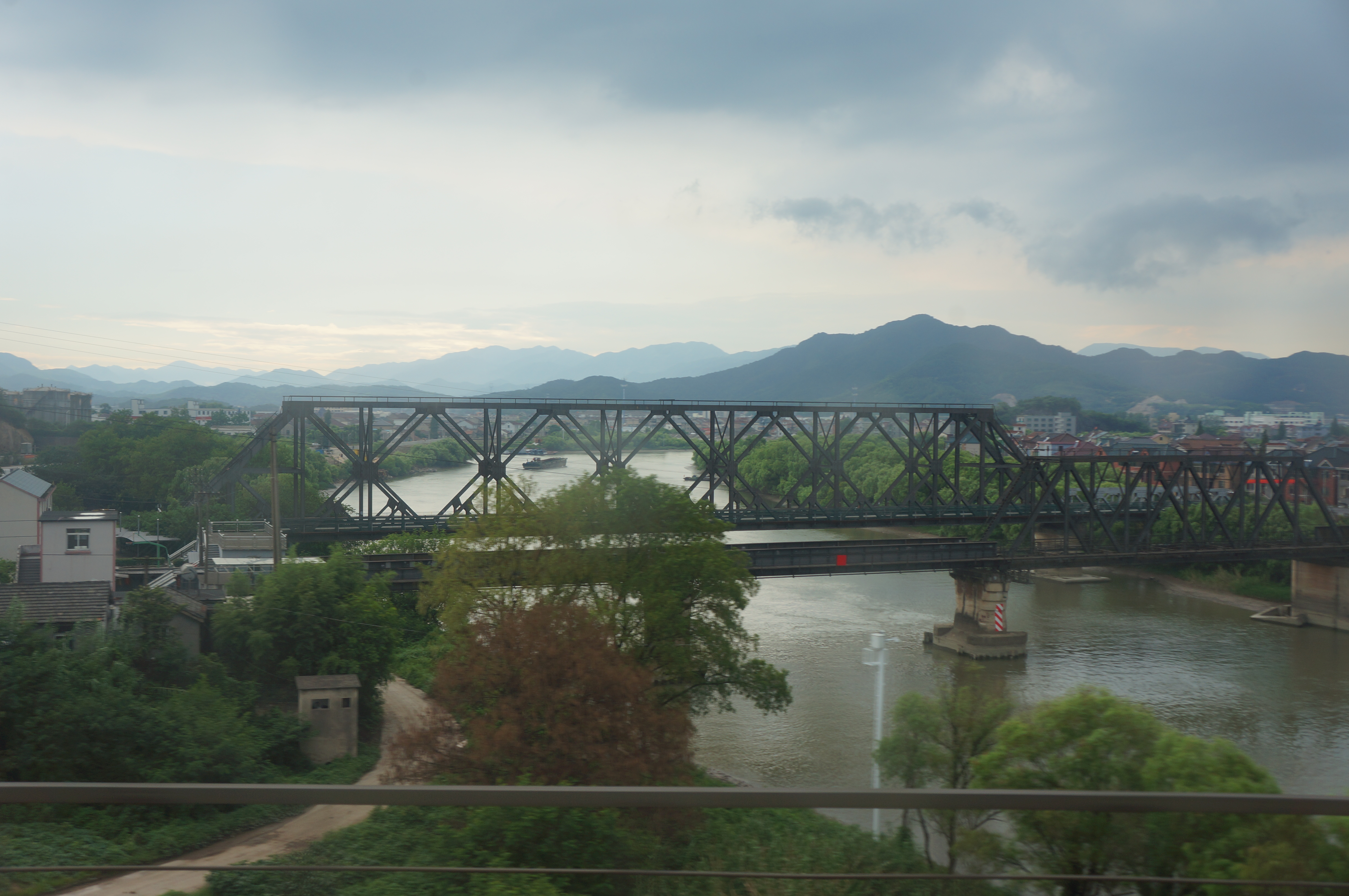
- Former Zhegan Railway Passes Puyang River
- Native name: 浦阳江 (Chinese)

Location
- Country: China

Physical characteristics
- Length: 150 km (93 mi)

The Puyang River (浦阳江) is one of the three main tributaries of the Qiantang River (钱塘江) in Zhejiang Province (浙江省), China.

At present, the Puyang River is 150 kilometers long and empties into the Qiantang River northwest of Linpu (临浦镇).

The gazette of Xiaoshan County (蕭山縣誌) states: "The Puyang River ... tends to flood easily because its catchment area is quite large, the course of the river is winding, the river bed descends in narrow channels, and the flow runs up against the incoming tide of the Qiantang Estuary.

Before the mid-15th century, the river ran east of Linpu to flow in a winding, snakelike course to the south of Xiaoshan (萧山) and the northwest of Shaoxing (绍兴市), leaving numerous lakes along its course before emptying into Hangzhou Bay.

The frequent flooding of the Puyang River has resulted in it being called the "Little Yellow River". This is a reference to the Yellow River, also known for flooding.

The river has its headwaters in Pujiang County (浦江县), a mountainous, scenic area in central Zhejiang, and runs through Zhuji (诸暨市), the home of the legendary beauty Xi Shi. Among the scenic sites located along or near the river are Matoushan (马头山), which has the shape of a horse's head, Nanshan (南山) with many strange rock formations, Changshan (常山), and Guanyenshan (官岩山), where legend says Yu the Great (Yu (Xia dynasty ruler)) ordered the opening of a channel for the Puyang River. Some of these names appear to come from the Shanhai Jing (山海经: A Chinese Bestiary).
