= Liuhe Pagoda =

Pagoda in Hangzhou, Zhejiang, China

Coordinates: 30°11′53.70″N 120°07′35.70″E

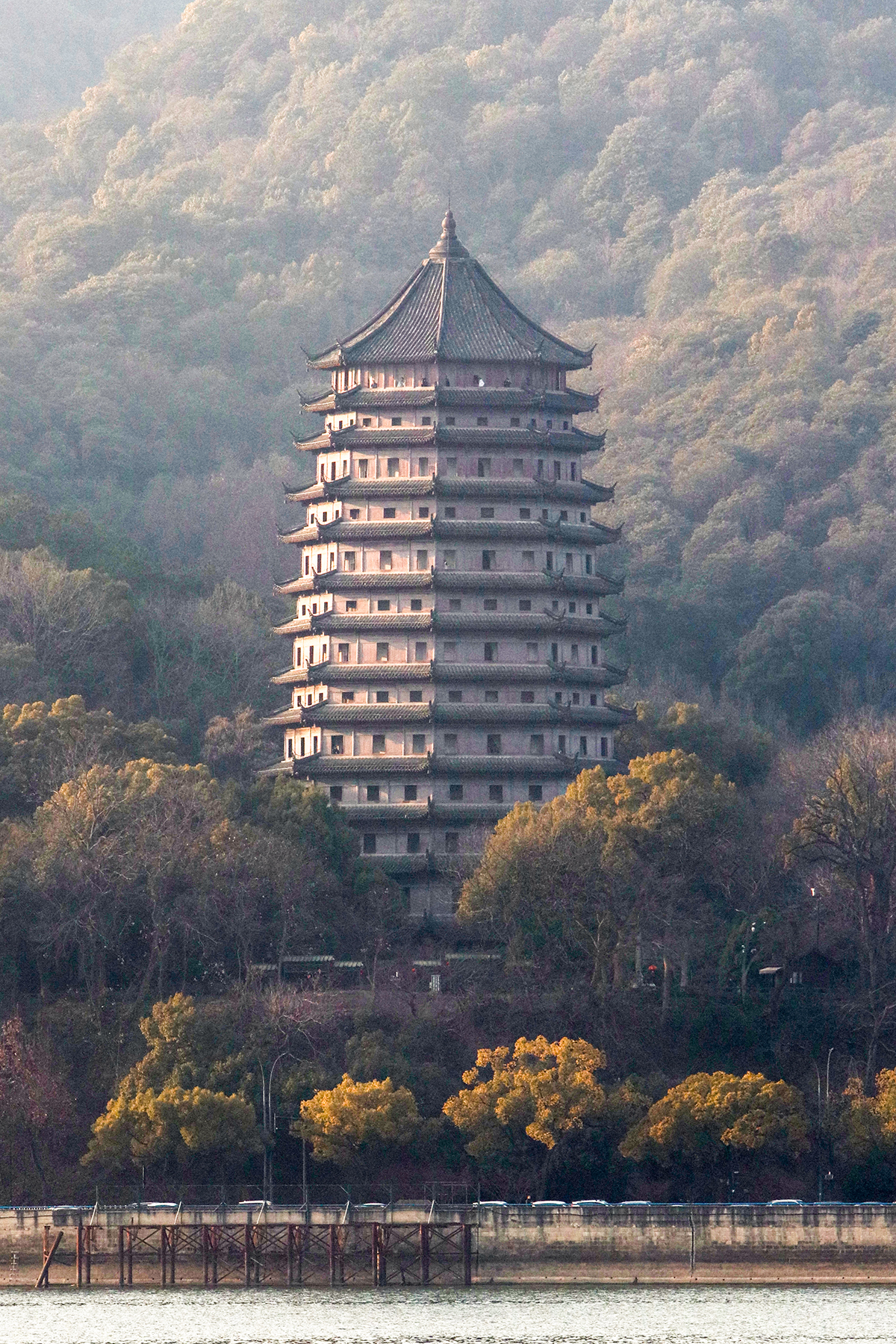
Liuhe Pagoda

Map

Liuhe Pagoda (Chinese: 六和塔; pinyin: Liùhé Tǎ; Wu: Loh-vhu Da), literally Six Harmonies Pagoda, is a multi-story Chinese pagoda in southern Hangzhou, Zhejiang province, China. It is located at the foot of Yuelun Hill, facing the Qiantang River. It was originally constructed in 970 by the Wuyue Kingdom, destroyed in 1121, and reconstructed fully by 1165, during the Southern Song dynasty (1127–1279).

== History and background ==
The pagoda was originally constructed by the ruler of the Wuyue Kingdom, whose capital was Hangzhou. The name Liuhe comes from the six Buddhist ordinances and it is said that the reason for building the pagoda was to calm the tidal bore of the Qiantang River and as a navigational aid. However, the pagoda was completely destroyed during warfare in the year 1121.

After the current pagoda was constructed of wood and brick during the Southern Song dynasty, additional exterior eaves were added during the Ming (1368–1644) and Qing Dynasties (1644–1911). The pagoda is octagonal in shape and some 59.89 metres (196.5 ft) in height, it also has the appearance of being a thirteen-story structure, though it only has seven interior stories. There is a spiral staircase leading to the top floor and upon each of the seven ceilings are carved and painted figures including animals, flowers, birds and characters. Each story of the pagoda consists of four elements, the exterior walls, a zigzagged corridor, the interior walls and a small chamber. Viewed from outside, the pagoda appears to be layered-bright on the upper surface and dark underneath. That is a harmonious alternation of light and shade.

According to the British sinologist and historian Joseph Needham, the pagoda also served as a lighthouse along the Qiantang River. Being of considerable size and stature, it actually served as a permanent lighthouse from nearly its beginning, to aid sailors in seeking anchorage for their ships at night (as described in the Hangzhou Fu Zhi).

A small "Pagoda Park" has recently been opened nearby. Its exhibition features models of ancient Chinese pagodas and illustrates the variety of different designs, as well as history, culture and symbols associated with the pagoda.

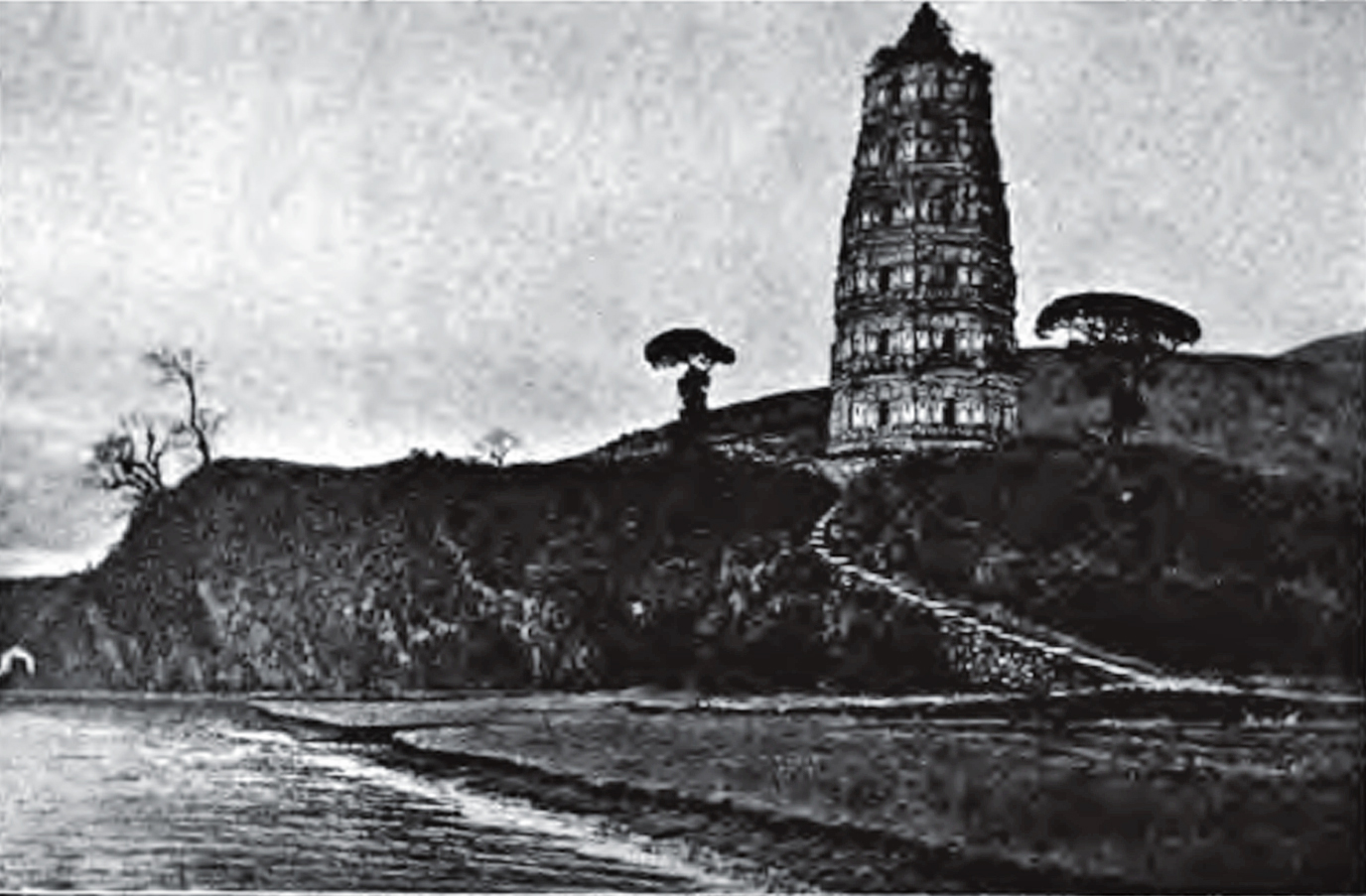
The pagoda was in disrepair before 1900

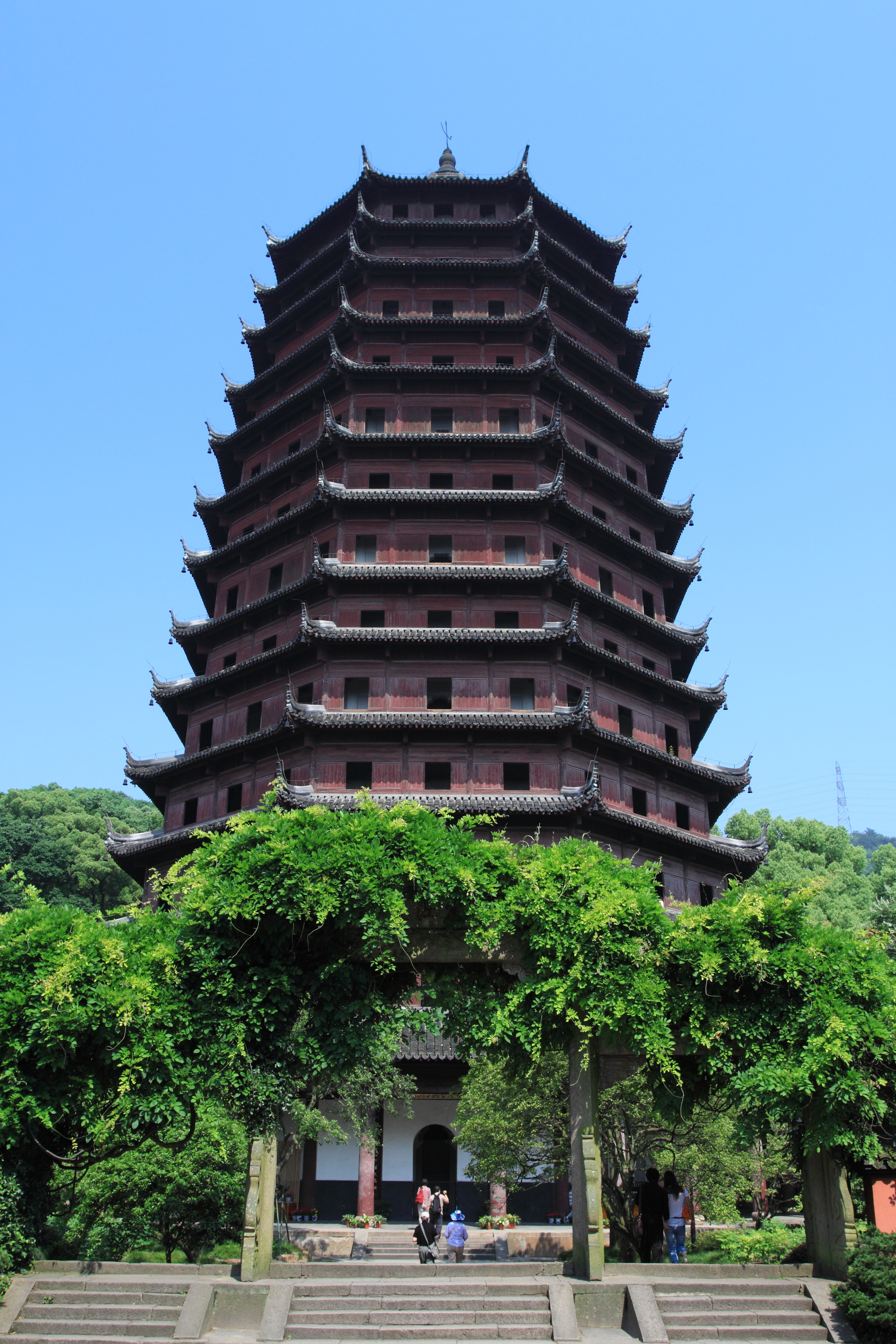

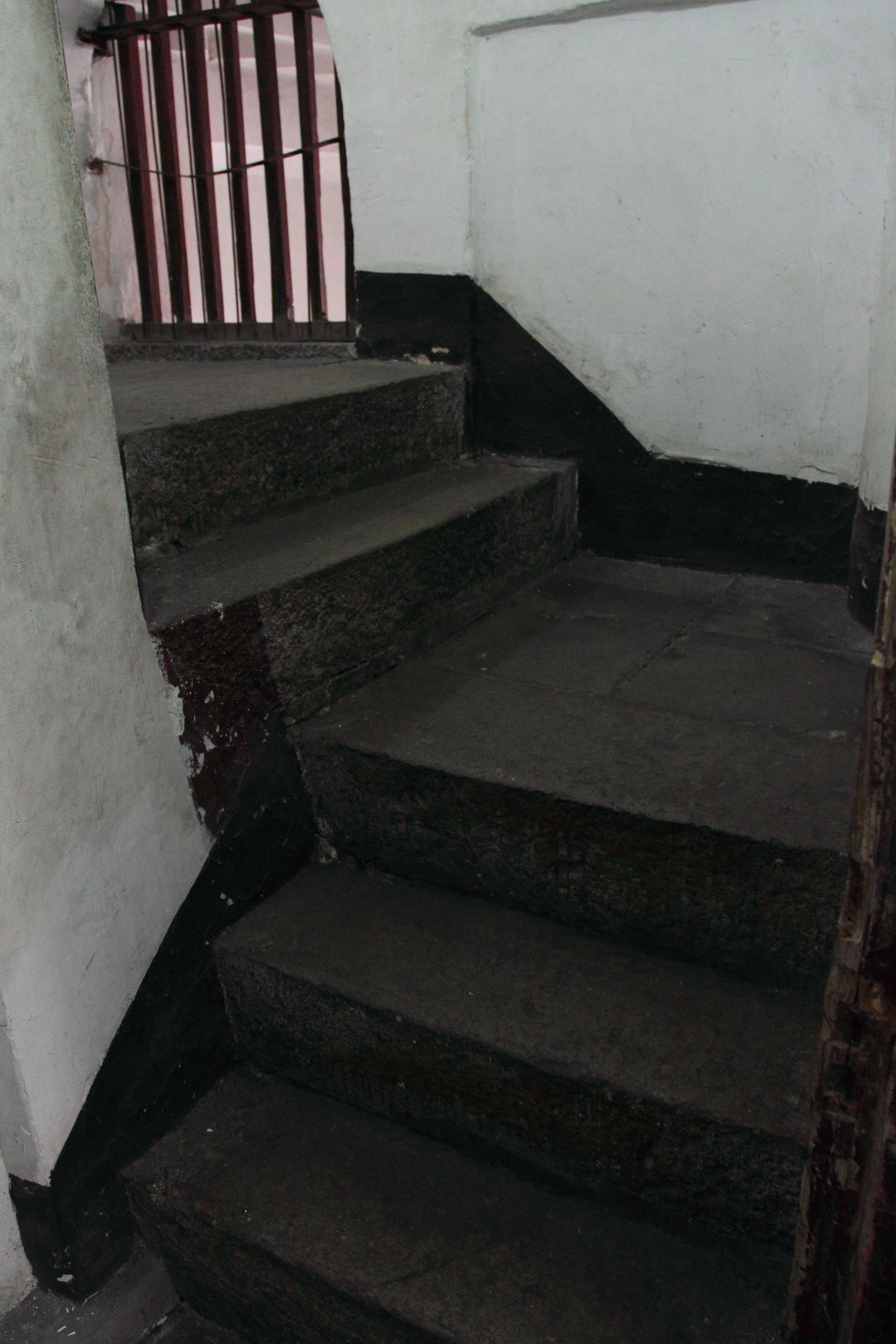

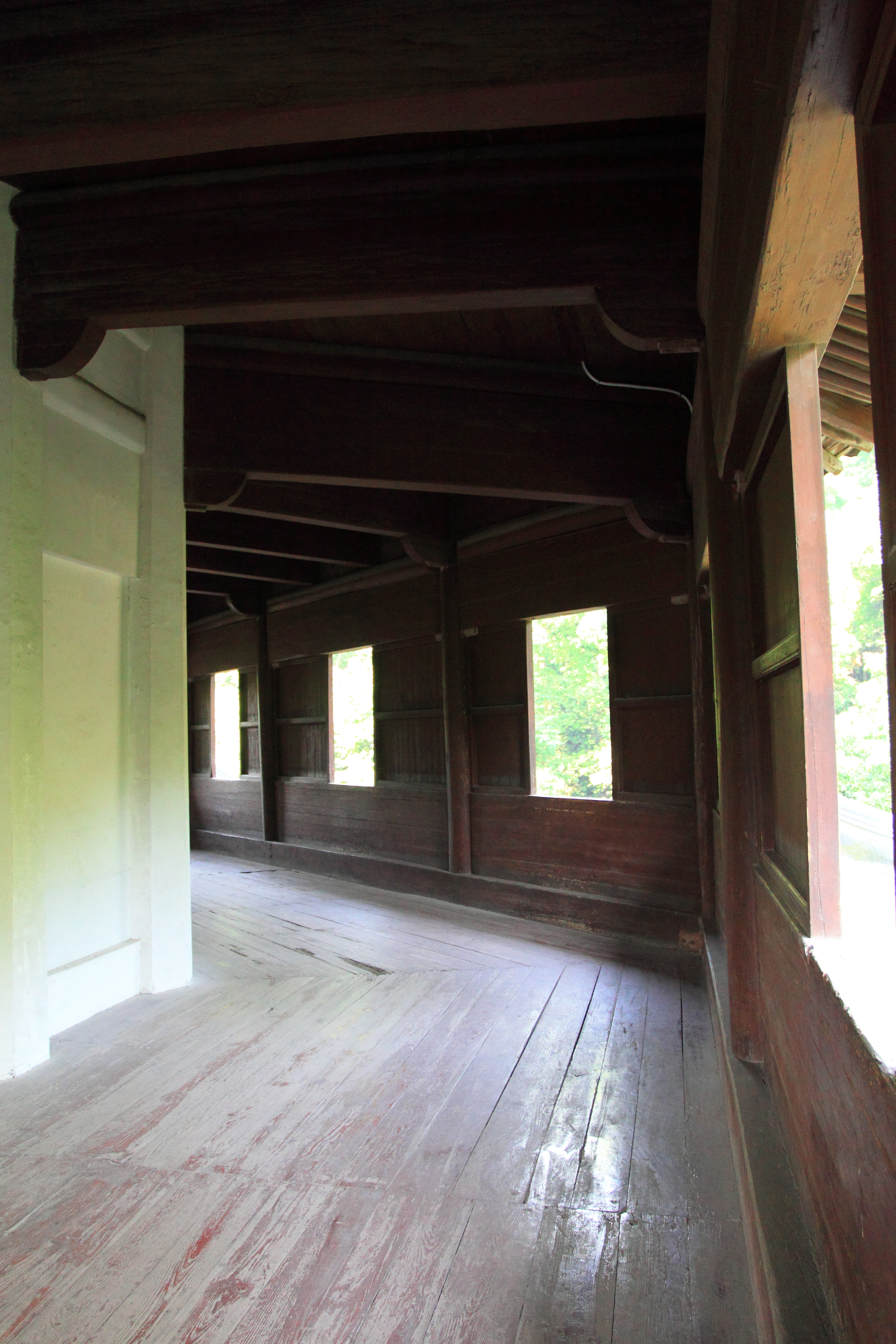

== See also ==
- Burmese pagoda
- Chinese architecture
- Architecture of the Song dynasty
- Chaitya & Stupa
- List of tallest structures built before the 20th century
