= Qiantang River =

River in East China

Coordinates: 30.3794°N 120.6889°E

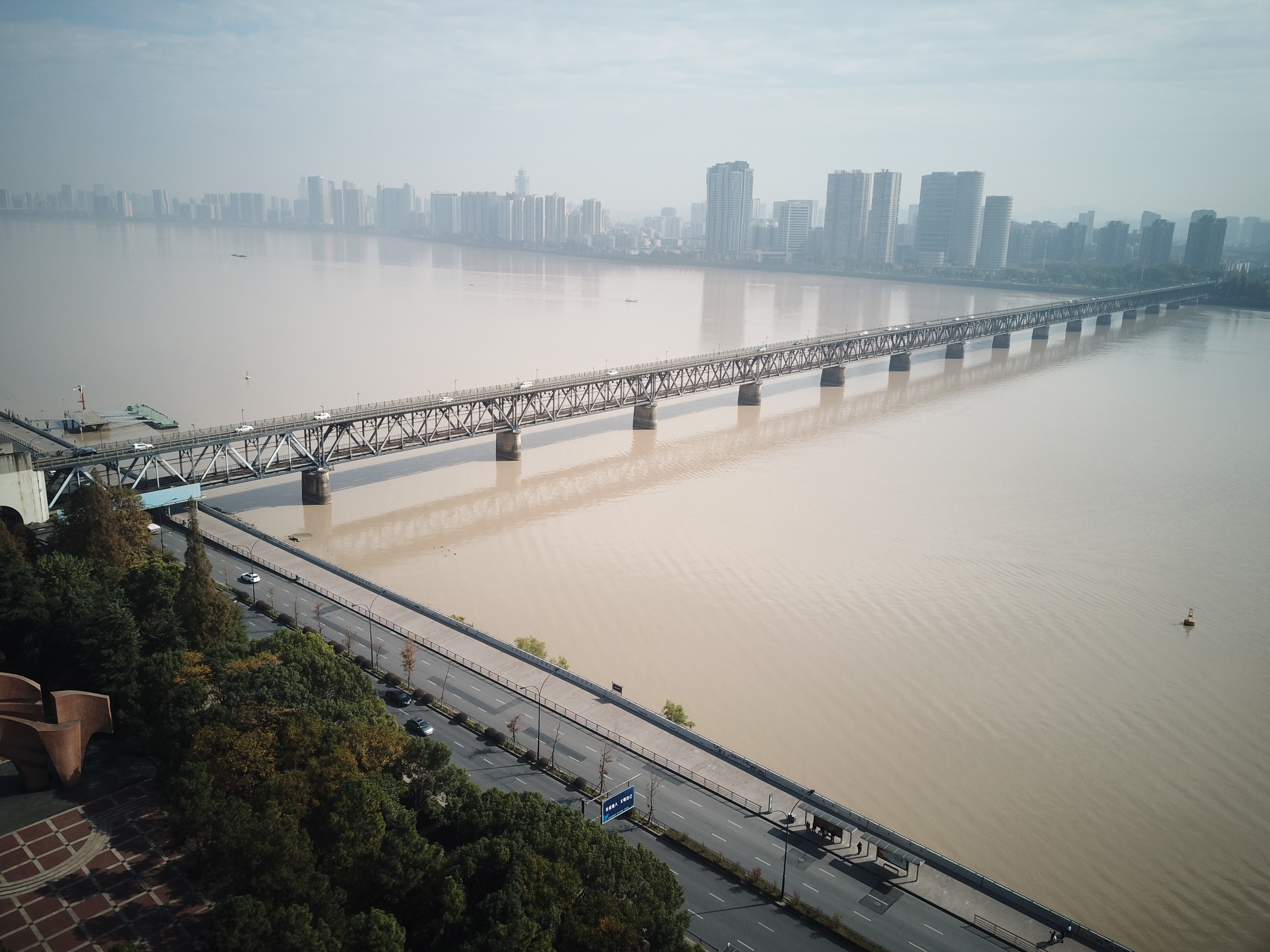
- Qiantang River and the bridge beneath Liuhe Pagoda
- Etymology: 钱塘县附近的河流

Location
- Country: China
- Province: Zhejiang, Anhui

Physical characteristics
- Source: 兰江
  - location: Qingzhidaijian (青芝埭尖), Xiuning, Anhui
  - elevation: 810 m (2,660 ft)
- 2nd source: Xin'an River
  - location: Liugujian (六股尖), Xiuning, Anhui
  - elevation: 1,350 m (4,430 ft)
- Mouth: Hangzhou Bay
- Basin size: 55,558 km^{2} (21,451 sq mi)

Basin features
- Cities: Hangzhou
- Tributaries
  - left: Jiu Stream
  - right: Cao'e River, Puyang River

Qiantang River
- Simplified Chinese: 钱塘江
- Traditional Chinese: 錢塘江
- Postal: Tsientang River
- Literal meaning: River of King Qian's Dyke
Transcriptions
Standard Mandarin
- Hanyu Pinyin: Qiántáng Jiāng
- Wade–Giles: Ch'ien-t'ang Chiang
- IPA: [tɕʰjɛ̌n.tʰǎŋ tɕjáŋ]
Wu
- Romanization: Chi-dhon kaon

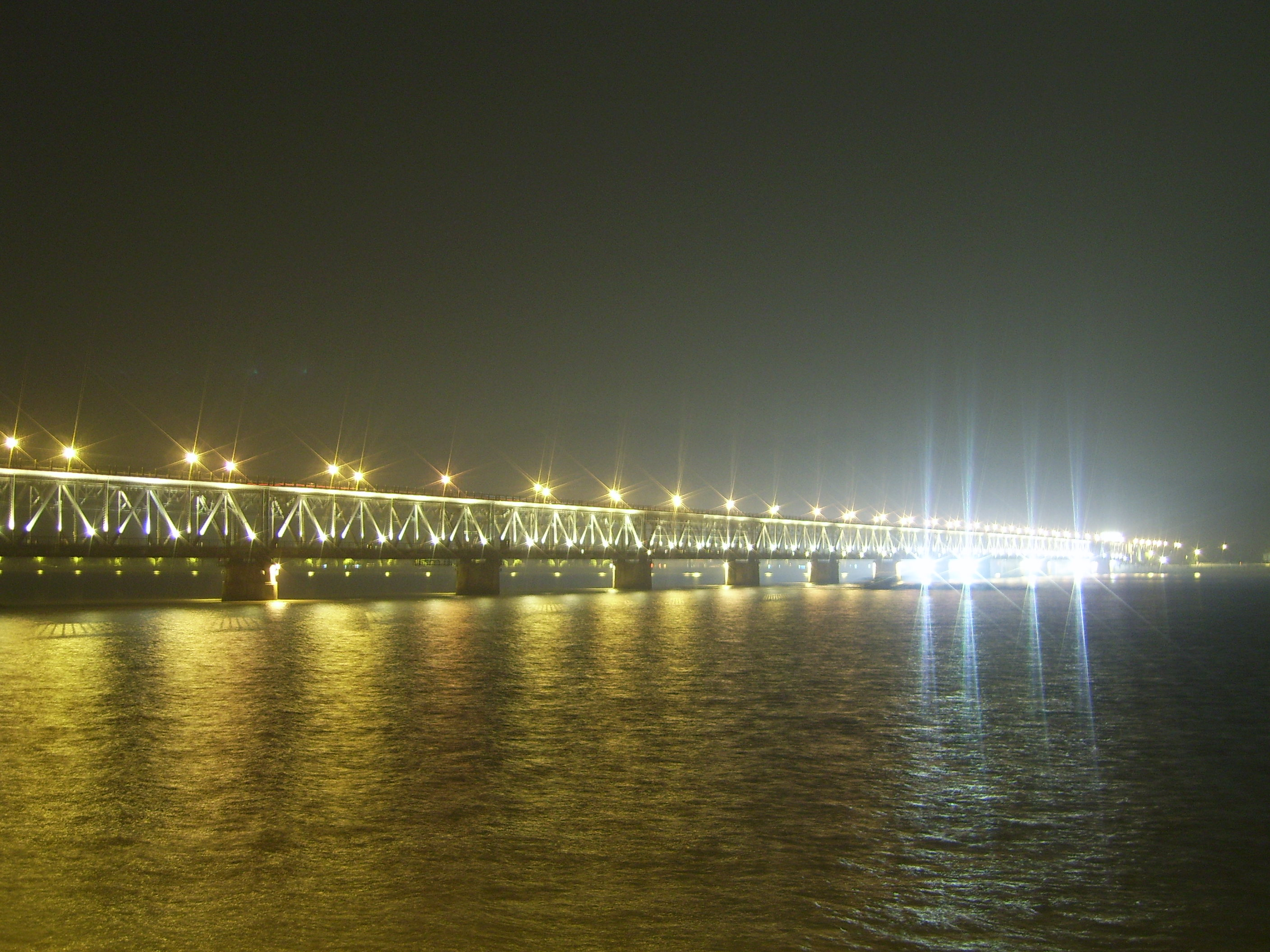
Qiantang River Bridge

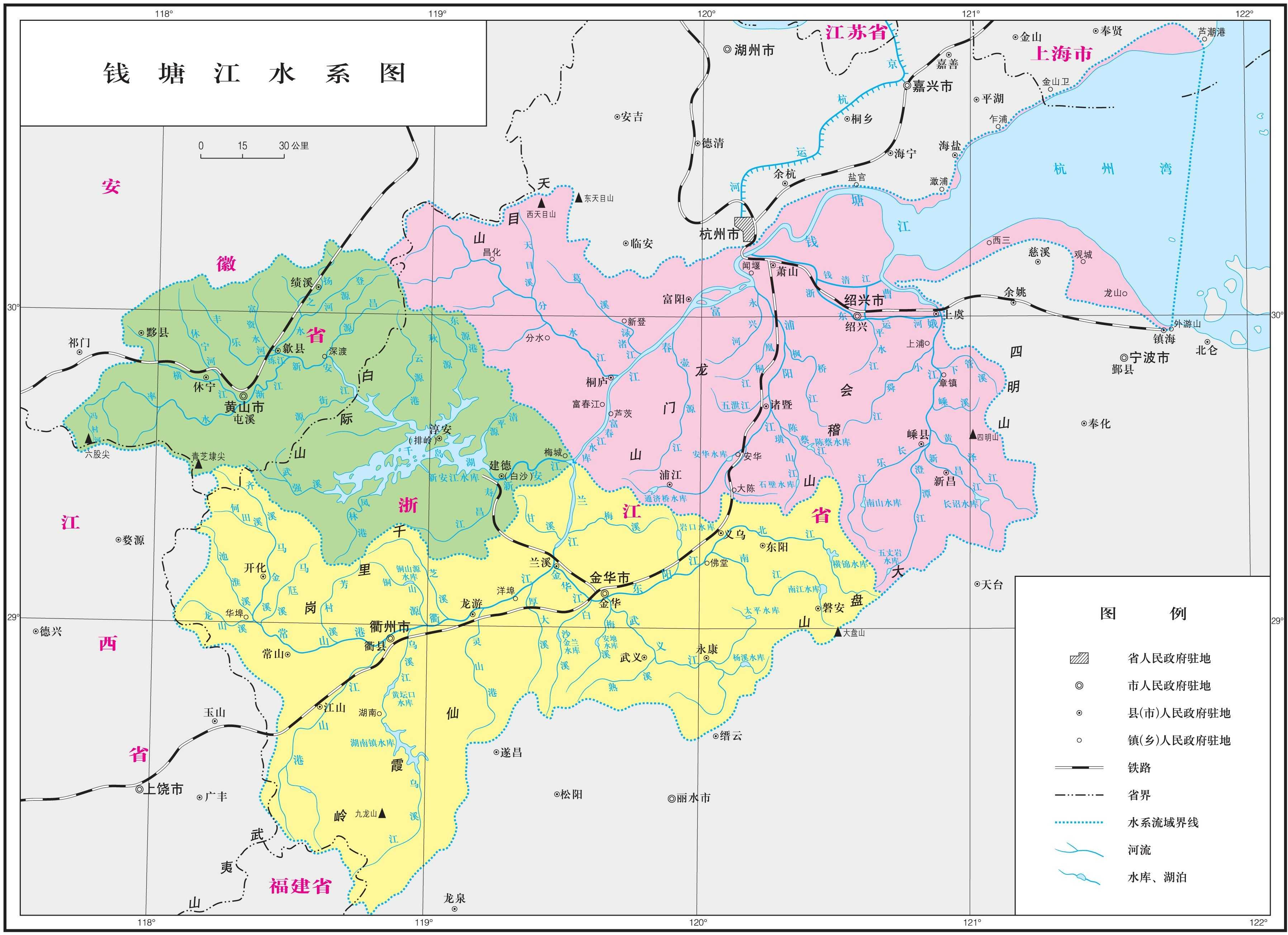
Map of the Qiantang watershed basin, in Zhejiang, Fujian, Jiangsu, and Jiangxi

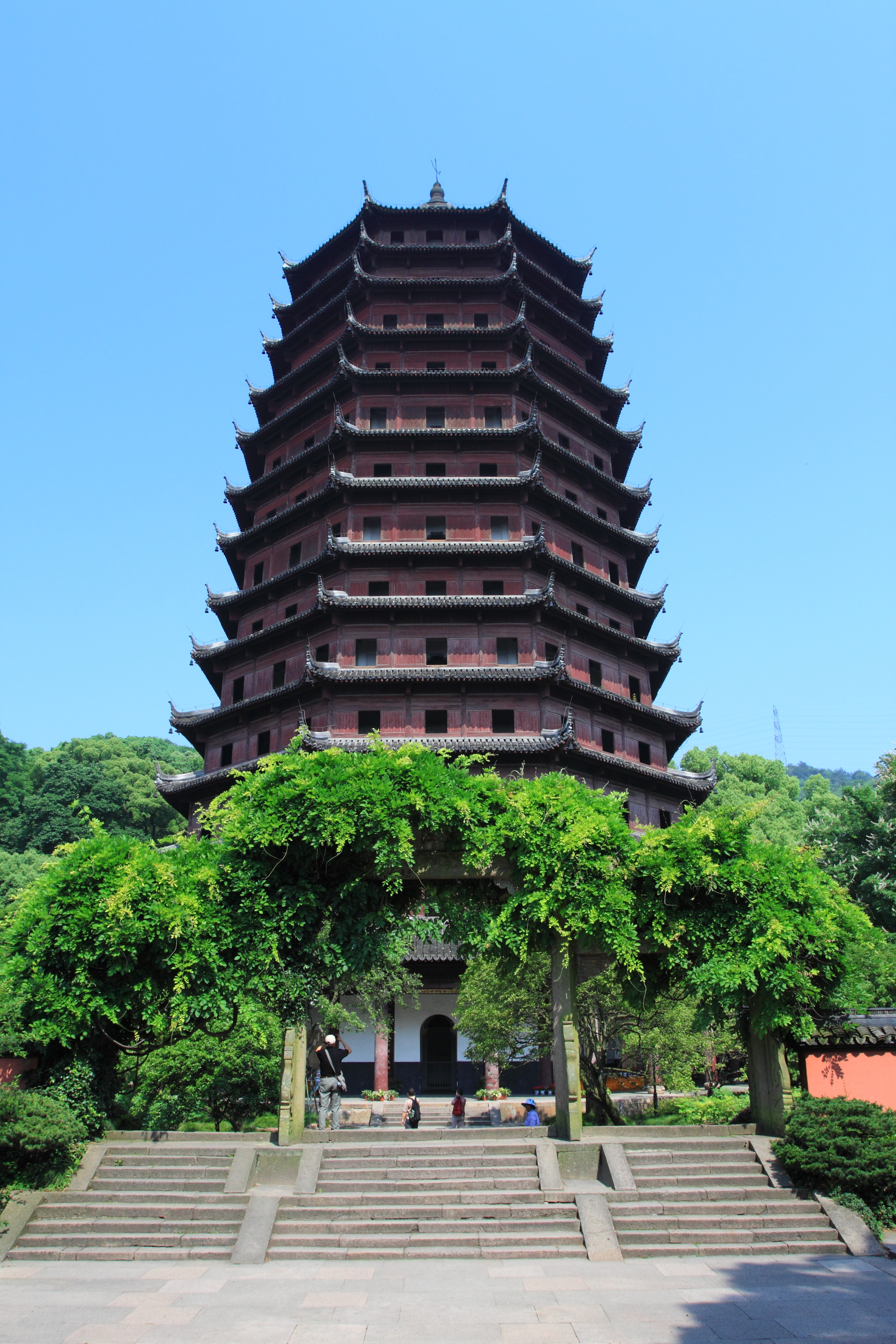
The Liuhe Pagoda built in 1165 on the Yuelun Hill in Hangzhou during the Song dynasty faces the Qiantang River.

The Qiantang River, formerly known as the Hangchow River or Tsientang River, is a river in East China. An important commercial artery, it runs for 459 kilometers (285 mi) through Zhejiang, passing through the provincial capital Hangzhou before flowing into the East China Sea via Hangzhou Bay south of Shanghai. Its original name, the "Zhe River" or "Zhe Jiang", is the origin of the name of Zhejiang province. The river is also known, along with Hangzhou Bay, for having what is called by locals as the "Silver Dragon", the world's largest tidal bore, a phenomenon where the leading edge of the incoming tide forms a wave (or waves) that can rise to a height of 9 meters (30 ft) and travels up the river or narrow bay at top speeds of 40 km/h (25 mph; 11 m/s) against the direction of the river or bay's current, and can be seen from miles away.

== Names ==
Its upper stretch near the Anhui–Jiangxi border is also known as the Xin'an River (新安, "Newly Peaceful"); its middle stretch through the mountains of Zhejiang is also known as the Fuchun River (富春江, "Abundant Spring River"); and the former name of its lower stretch—the Zhe (浙) or Crooked River—gave Zhejiang Province its name.

Historically, it was first documented in the Classic of Mountains and Seas as the Zhejiang River (浙江). It appeared later in the Zhuangzi as the Zhe River (淛河) and then in the Water Classic as the Jianjiang River (漸江水). All those names probably originate from the Old Yue language of the Baiyue peoples. In the early 18th century, the Kangxi Dictionary glossed the Zhejiang River as taking its name from its crooked lower stretch and the countercurrent tidal bore.

The Qiantang River's current name, literally the River of King Qian's Dyke, is similarly somewhat misleading. Rather than being named directly after the Qian kings of Wuyue, it instead took the name from its lower stretch within Qiantang County (zh:钱塘县), a former name of Hangzhou City, and only later in the 20th century became known by the name throughout its course.

== History ==
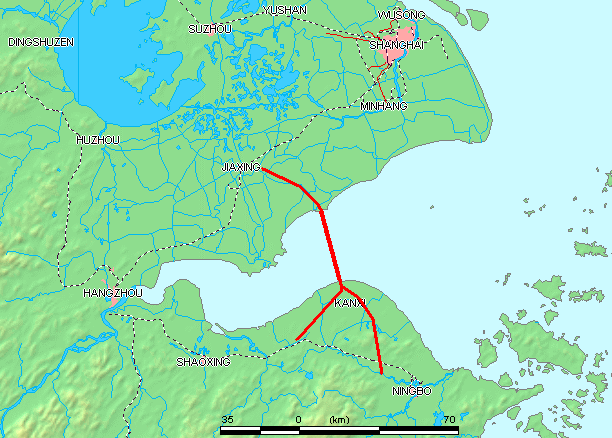
The lower stretches of the Qiantang river as it empties into Hangzhou Bay

It was linked by the Xixing Canal to Shaoxing and to Ningbo's Yong River during the Jin dynasty. It was linked by the Grand Canal to Luoyang, Xi'an, and Beijing during the Sui dynasty. The Tang warlord Qian Liu, who established the Wuyue Kingdom as one of China's Ten Kingdoms in the early 10th century, constructed a large dike against the river's bore.

== Basin ==
Qiantang River is one of the largest rivers on the southeast coast of China. It runs through Zhejiang, Anhui, Fujian, and Jiangxi provinces, and is also the largest river in Zhejiang. "Qiantang" originally refers to the name of the river below the gate of Hangzhou, but now refers to the whole river basin. Qiantang River basin generally is abundant rainfall with developed water system (total of 60 tributaries), which is feather distribution. If count from the north source (Xinan river), the length of Qiantang river is 588.73 km. While if count from the south source (Qu river), the length of Qiantang river is 522.22 km. The main rivers of Qiantang river basin are Majin river, Changshan river, Qu river, Lan river, Xinan river, Fuchun river and Qiantang river.

== Hydrological characteristics ==
Overall, the runoff of the Qiantang River is abundant. However, the incoming water of Qiantang River is strongly impacted by seasonal variation. In general, the runoff from April to June can occupy about 50% of the total annual flow. Because the Qiantang River valley is located in the southeast coastal monsoon climate zone, the main source of runoff is atmospheric precipitation. The runoff and precipitation in the river valley show obvious consistency in both regional distribution and annual variation. The average annual discharge is 2.905×10^{10} cubic meters, and the average annual sediment discharge is 6.68×10^{6} tons. In addition, the annual runoff of the Qiantang River and its tributaries showed significant changes in abundance and drought.

The tidal bore is one of the most significant features of the Qiantang River. Due to the shape of the estuary's riverbed, the tidal range increases along the way, resulting in the sharp deformation of tidal waves. The average tidal range of Zhenhai on the south bank of Wankou was 1.69 meters, the average tidal range of Ganpu was 5.45 meters. The tidal current of Hangzhou Bay is a clockwise rotating tidal current and the speed is generally 15~20 m/s, The north shore can be up to 3~4 m/s. The average incoming tidal current of Ganpu station was 18,850,000 cubic meters per second. On the other hand, the river bed at the estuary of the Qiantang River is wide and shallow, forming a broad intertidal zone. Under the influence of seasonal runoff and tidal fluctuation, the riverbed can easily be violently deformed. In autumn, due to the strong tide, the main trough oscillates along the direction of the rising tide crest. In the season of abundant runoff, the main trough swings along the direction of ebb tide. Because of the process of main trough oscillation, the beach ground is easy to collapse and retreat quickly.

== Tidal bore ==
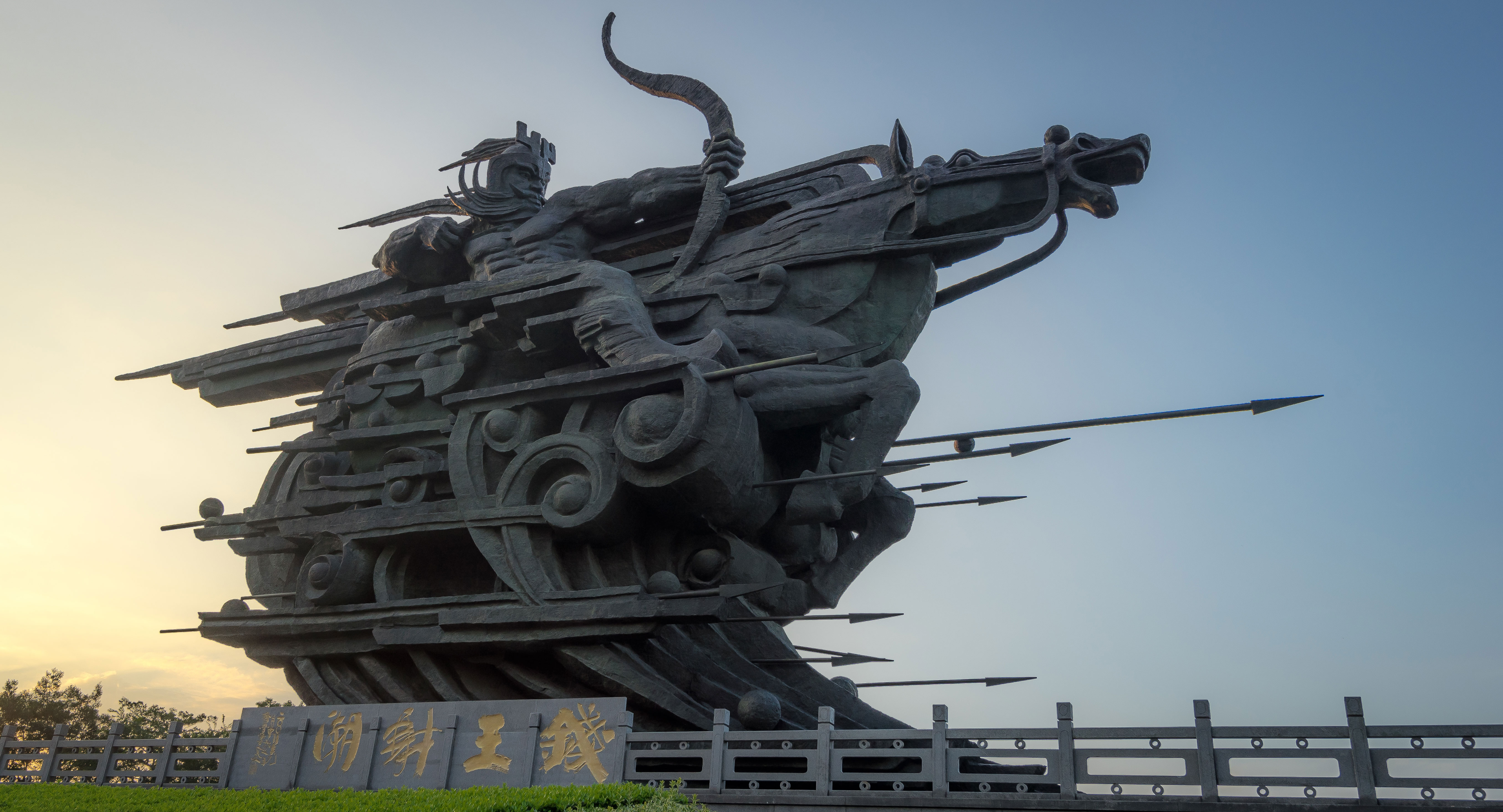
King Qian Liu shooting the tidal bore

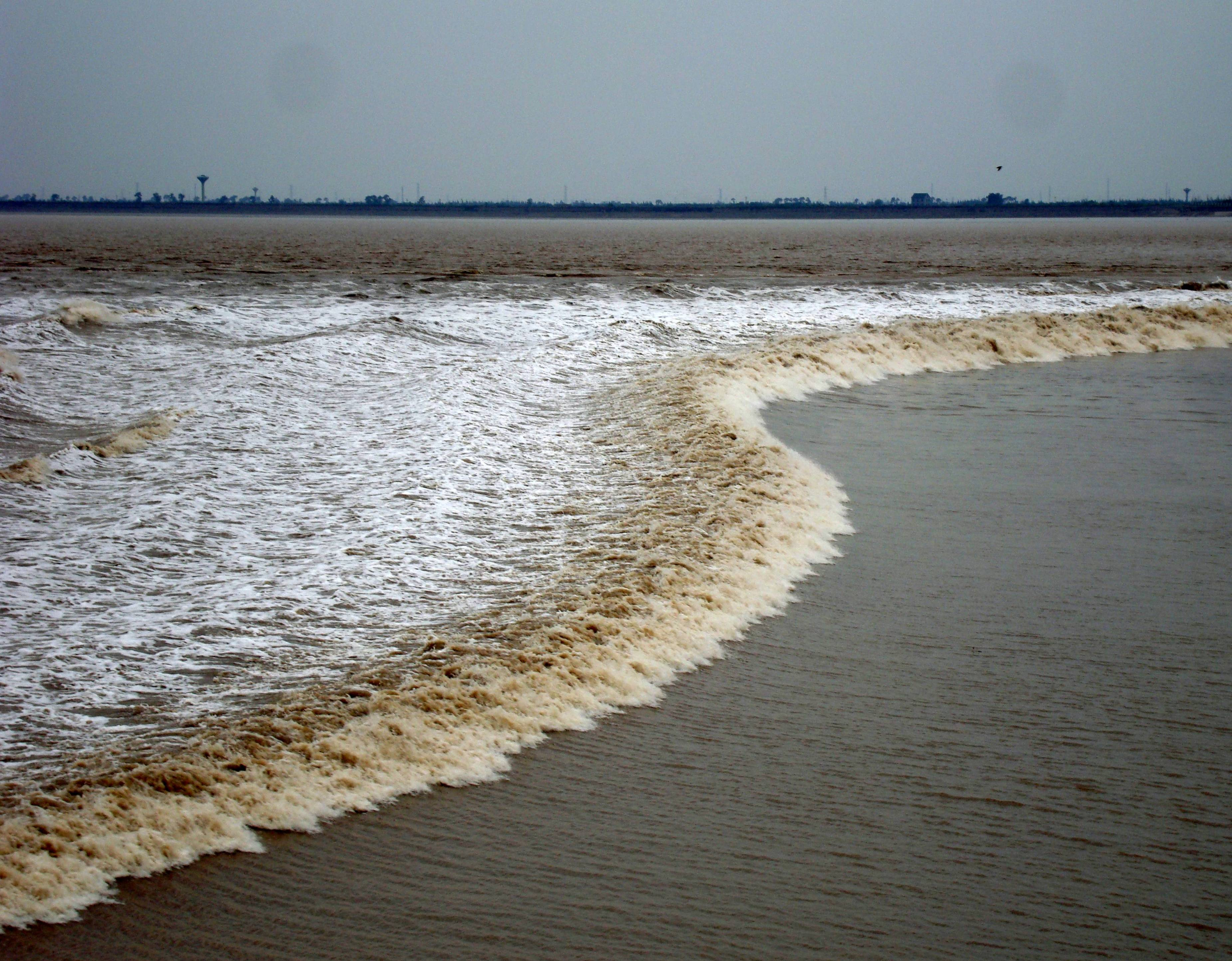
Tidal bore at the Qiantang River

The river and Hangzhou Bay are known for the world's largest tidal bore. The oldest known tide table (AD 1056) is for the Qiantang River and may have aided ancient travelers wishing to see the famous tidal bore. The tide rushing into the river mouth from the bay causes a bore which can reach up to 9 meters (30 ft) in height, and travel at up to 40 km per hour (25 miles an hour). Known locally as the Silver (or Black) Dragon, the wave sweeps past Hangzhou, menacing shipping in the harbor.

The tidal bore draws in tourists where in the middle of the 8th month of the lunar calendar, there would be crowds celebrating the wave in the "festival of the Silver Dragon" and thousands would line the streets and watch the tidal wave roll in from the sea. In August 2013, the tidal bore turned out stronger than expected due to Typhoon Trami, reaching more than twice its usual height as it broke on the flood barrier, sweeping it and injuring numerous spectators.

There have been attempts to surf the tidal bore. In ancient China, riding the bore was an important ritual but the practice only existed during the Song dynasty (960–1279) and peaked in the 12th–13th century before becoming banned and lost in time. Ancient surfers would ride the waves as part of a ritual dedicated to the god of waves or the "Dragon King", and also to help entertain the emperor. However the practise later became banned after officials criticised the tattooed surfers or "nongchaoers" as being arrogant people, who neglected their family obligations. The first person in modern history, documented to ride the bore was Stuart Matthews from England whose 1998 record was riding the bore for 1.9 km. Then, in October 2007, a group of international surfers brought by Antony Colas did several attempts, one wave being ridden continuously by French Patrick Audoy and Brazilian Eduardo Bagé for 1h10min, for 17 km. In September 2008, a group of American surfers convinced the Chinese government to allow them to surf a section of the river.

In November 2013, Red Bull held the first surf competition on the river, called the "Qiantang Shoot Out". It was also the first of its kind surf contest to ride on a tidal bore that was dubbed as the "most unusual wave in the world".

== Ecology ==
The Qiantang River basin is rich in ecosystem types. Forest ecosystems in the west and south which are composed of evergreen and deciduous broad-leaved forests. The forest ecosystem with the widespread wetlands creates a variety of species. However, with the development of industry, the ecological environment of Qiantang River basin has deteriorated and soil erosion is becoming a serious problem. Although the forest coverage is high, the trend of islandization and fragmentation of wildlife native habitats is obvious, and biodiversity is under threat.

== Notable points ==
=== Qiantang river tidal bore ===
Around August 15, Lunar Calendar is the best time to observe the tides. Generally, the best time to observe the tides is around the 15th day of the Eighth Lunar Month. At that time, the largest Qiantang River tidal bore can reach a height of several meters [28; 29]. Before the sea tide's arrival, a tiny white dot appears in the distance, which transforms into a silver thread in a blink of an eye. Subsequently, accompanied by waves of dull thunder, the white line rolls toward the observers. Due to the change in geographical location, since the Ming dynasty, Haining, Hanguan became the premier resort for tide observation, leading to the phenomenon also being called the "Haining Tidal Bore".

=== Qiantang river bridge ===
The Qiantang river bridge, also called the first Qiantang River Bridge, was designed by Chinese bridge expert Yisheng Mao. It is a double-deck truss girder bridge spanning the Qiantang River in Hangzhou city, Zhejiang province, China. The ridge is located at the southern end of Hangzhou city, approximately 700 meters to the east of Liuhe pagoda, situated between the Nanxing Bridge station of Zhejiang-jiangxi railway. It is recognised as the first double-deck railway and highway bridge designed and built by China itself, marking a milestone in the history of Chinese Bridges. The Qiantang River Bridge is 1453 meters long, 9.1 meters wide, and 71 meters high. The bridge's upper deck is a two-way, two-lane highway with a design speed of 100 km/h, and the lower deck is a single-track railway with a design speed of 120 km/h. During World War II, the Qiantang River Bridge was hit by Japanese air raids. Afterwards, the Qiantang River Bridge was deliberately blown up to the piers to resist the Japanese attack. It was fully repaired in 1948.

== Culture ==
Qiantang River has been regarded as the birthplace of Wuyue culture. The characteristics of Wuyue culture are pardon, inclusive, intelligent, realistic, pioneering and brave, which also have been the cultural deposits displayed by Qiantang River. In addition, Liangzhu culture, southern Song dynasty culture, West lake culture and other regional cultures are also distributed in the area of Qiantang River basin. Liangzhu culture has a long history, which adds the thick and simplicity tone to the Qiantang River. The secularization and leisure of the southern Song dynasty culture, combined with the river crossing, have the charm of Qibao teahouse and Jianqiao old street, and contributed to the economic development of the dynasty.

Qiantang River has been deeply loved by ancient Chinese writers and artists, as can be seen from the example of, "Dwelling in the Fuchun Mountains" by painter Gongwang Huang.

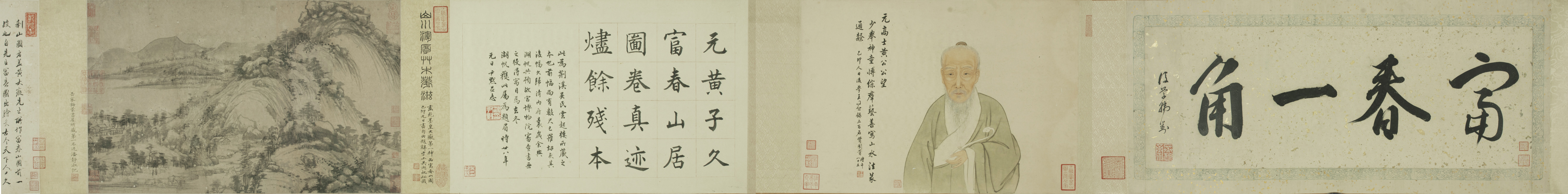
The first section of the painting, The Remaining Mountain, currently kept in the Zhejiang Provincial Museum in Hangzhou
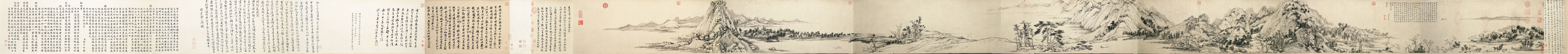
The second section, The Master Wuyong Scroll, currently kept in the National Palace Museum in Taipei

It was regarded as the culmination of ancient Chinese landscape painting and the peak of art. Zhou Mi's "observation tide" was praised as a literary classic and it still listed as a point article in the textbook of ancient Chinese literature. Sun Quan, as a hero and the ruler of the kingdom of Wu in The Three Kingdoms period. In modern times writer Dafu Yu, revolutionary writer and artist Yan Xia, and scientist Wang Chong are the famous persons born in Qiantang River Basin, and these people made an important contribution to the development of Qiantang culture.

Qiantang River is mentioned in The Tale of Kieu as the place where Wang Cuiqiao committed suicide. Additionally, it is mentioned in some versions of The Butterfly Lovers, as the river that the protagonists must cross to go to school in Hangzhou.

== Tributaries ==
- Lan River
  - Jinhua River
  - Qu River
- Xinan River
- Fengshui River
- Lvzhu River
- Puyang River
- Cao'e River
