= List of presidents of Zhejiang University =

== Qiushi Academy - Zhejiang Advanced College period ==
School name	Office Period	Name (in Chinese)	Title (in Chinese)
Qiushi Academy	1897–1900	Lin Qi (林启)	President (总办（兼）)
Qiushi Academy	1900 – Sep 1901	Lu Maoxun (陆懋勋)	President (总理)
Zhejiang Qiushi Academy	Oct 1901 – 1902	Lao Naixuan (劳乃宣)	President (总理)
Zhejiang Academy	1902 – June 1903	Lao Naixuan (劳乃宣)	President (总理)
Zhejiang Advanced College	July 1903 – 1904	Tao Baolian (陶葆廉)	President (监督)
Zhejiang Advanced College	1904–1905	Lu Maoxun (陆懋勋)	President (监督)
Zhejiang Advanced College	1905 – July 1906	Xiang Zaoxin (项藻馨)	President (监督)
Zhejiang Advanced College	Aug 1906 – 1910	Wu Zhenchun (吴震春)	President (监督)
Zhejiang Advanced College	1910–1912	Sun Zhimin (孙智敏)	President (监督)
Zhejiang Advanced College	1912 – June 1912	Shao Peizi (邵裴子)	President (校长)
Zhejiang Advanced College	July 1912 – 1913	Chen Daqi (陈大齐)	President (校长)
Zhejiang Advanced College	1913–1914	Hu Zhuangyou (胡壮猷)	President (校长)

== National 3rd Sun Yat-sen University - National Chekiang University period ==
Chekiang University or National Chekiang University is also known as the University of Chekiang. Chekiang is the same as Zhejiang.

School name	Office Period	Name (in Chinese)	Title (in Chinese)
National 3rd Sun Yat-sen University; Chekiang University (Apr 1928 -); National Chekiang University (1 Jul 1928 -)	Jul 1927 – Jul 1930	Jiang Menglin (蒋梦麟)	President (校长)
National Chekiang University	Jul 1930 – Nov 1931	Shao Peizi (邵裴子)	President (校长)
National Chekiang University	Apr 1932 – Mar 1933	Cheng Tianfang (程天放)	President (校长)
National Chekiang University	Apr 1933 – Feb 1936	Guo Renyuan (郭任远)	President (校长)
National Chekiang University	Feb–Apr 1936	Zheng Xiaocang (郑晓沧)	Acting President (代理校长)
National Chekiang University	Apr 1936 – May 1949	Coching Chu (竺可桢)	President (校长)

== Zhejiang University (dissociated) period ==
=== Zhejiang University presidents ===
School name	Office Period	Name (in Chinese)	Title (in Chinese)
Zhejiang University	Aug 1949 – May 1951	Ma Yinchu (马寅初)	President (校长)
Zhejiang University	May 1951 – Oct 1952	Wang Guosong (王国松)	Acting President (代理校长)
Zhejiang University	Oct 1952 – Jan 1953	Sha Wenhan (沙文汉)	President (校长（兼）)
Zhejiang University	Apr 1953 – Apr 1958	Huo Shilian (霍士廉)	President (校长（兼）)
Zhejiang University	Apr 1958 – Mar 1962	Zhou Rongxin (周荣鑫)	President (校长)
Zhejiang University	Jun 1962 – Apr 1968	Chen Weida (陈伟达)	President (校长（兼）)
Zhejiang University	Feb 1979 – Jun 1982	Qian Sanqiang (钱三强)	President (校长（兼）)
Zhejiang University	Jun 1982 – Feb 1984	Yang Shilin (杨士林)	President (校长)
Zhejiang University	Feb 1984 – Feb 1988	Han Zhenxiang (韩祯祥)	President (校长)
Zhejiang University	Feb 1988 – Apr 1995	Lu Yongxiang (路甬祥)	President (校长)
Zhejiang University	Apr 1995 – Sep 1998	Pan Yunhe (潘云鹤)	President (校长)
Zhejiang University	Jun 1982 – Sep 1989	Liu Dan (刘丹)	Honorary President (名誉校长)

=== Zhejiang Normal College - Hangzhou University presidents ===
School name	Office Period	Name (in Chinese)	Title (in Chinese)
Zhejiang Normal College	Feb–Dec 1952	Liu Dan (刘丹)	President (院长（兼）)
Zhejiang Normal College	Dec 1952 – Jun 1957	Yu Zhongwu (俞仲武)	President (院长)
Zhejiang Normal College	Jun 1957 – Nov 1958	Chen Li (陈立)	President (院长)
Hangzhou University	Sep 1959 – May 1962	Lin Hujia (林乎加)	President (校长（兼）)
Hangzhou University	May 1962 – Apr 1964	Lu Zhixian (吕志先)	President (校长（兼）)
Hangzhou University	Jul 1978 – Feb 1979	Wang Jiayang (王家扬)	President (校长（兼）)
Hangzhou University	Feb 1979 – Oct 1983	Chen Li (陈立)	President (校长)
Hangzhou University	Oct 1983 – Jan 1986	Xue Yanzhuang (薛艳庄)	President (校长)
Hangzhou University	Jan 1986 – Jun 1996	Shen Shanhong (沈善洪)	President (校长)
Hangzhou University	Jun 1996 – Sep 1998	Zheng Xiaoming (郑小明)	President (校长)
Hangzhou University	6 Oct 1983 – Sep 1998	Chen Li (陈立)	Honorary President (名誉校长)

=== Zhejiang Agricultural College / University presidents ===
School name	Office Period	Name (in Chinese)	Title (in Chinese)
Zhejiang Agricultural College	Dec 1952 – Jun 1957	Wu Zhichuan (吴植椽)	President (院长（兼）)
Zhejiang Agricultural College	Jun 1957 – Mar 1960	Jin Mengjia (金孟加)	President (院长)
Zhejiang Agricultural University	Mar 1960 – Oct 1961	Li Fengping (李丰平)	President (校长（兼）)
Zhejiang Agricultural University	Oct 1961 – 1965	Ding Zhenling (丁振麟)	President (校长)
Zhejiang Agricultural University	Apr 1978 – Mar 1979	Chen Zuolin (陈作霖)	President (校长（兼）)
Zhejiang Agricultural University	Mar 1979 – Jun 1979	Ding Zhenling (丁振麟)	President (校长)
Zhejiang Agricultural University	Mar 1980 – Oct 1983	Zhu Zuxiang (朱祖祥)	President (校长)
Zhejiang Agricultural University	Oct 1983 – Sep 1989	Chen Ziyuan (陈子元)	President (校长)
Zhejiang Agricultural University	Sep 1989 – Mar 1993	Li Debao (李德葆)	President (校长（兼）)
Zhejiang Agricultural University	Mar 1993 – Dec 1997	Xia Yingwu (夏英武)	President (校长)
Zhejiang Agricultural University	Dec 1997 – Sep 1998	Cheng Jia'an (程家安)	President (校长)
Zhejiang Agricultural University	Jun 1984 – 1996	Zhu Zuxiang (朱祖祥)	Honorary President (名誉校长)

=== Zhejiang Medical College / University presidents ===
School name	Office Period	Name (in Chinese)	Title (in Chinese)
Zhejiang Medical College	Oct 1951 – Apr 1955	Hong Shilu (洪式闾)	President (院长（兼）)
Zhejiang Medical College	May 1956 – Sep 1958	Wang Zhongqiao (王仲侨)	President (院长)
Zhejiang Medical University	Feb 1960 – Sep 1963	Zheng Ping (郑平)	President (校长（兼）)
Zhejiang Medical University	Mar 1964 – Nov 1968	Li Lanyan (李兰炎)	President (校长（兼）)
Zhejiang Medical University	Jul 1978 – Mar 1979	Wang Yaoting (王耀庭)	President (校长（兼）)
Zhejiang Medical University	Mar 1979 – Jan 1984	Wang Jiwu (王季午)	President (校长)
Zhejiang Medical University	Jan 1984 – Nov 1996	Zheng Shu (郑树)	President (校长)
Zhejiang Medical University	Nov 1996 – Sep 1998	Chen Zhaodian (陈昭典)	President (校长)
Zhejiang Medical University	Jan 1984 – Sep 1998	Wang Jiwu (王季午)	Honorary President (名誉校长)

== Zhejiang University (reunified) period ==
School name	Office Period	Name (in Chinese)	Title (in Chinese)
Zhejiang University	Sep 1998 – Aug 2006	Pan Yunhe (潘云鹤)	President (校长)
Zhejiang University	Aug 2006 – Feb 2013	Yang Wei (杨卫)	President (校长)
Zhejiang University	Jun 2013 – Feb 2015	Lin Jianhua (林建华)	President (校长)
Zhejiang University	Mar 2015 – Now	Wu Zhaohui (吴朝晖)	President (校长)

== Presidents of other roots ==
In history, several schools (either their students, faculties or whole campus) were merged into Zhejiang University. And their presidents in history are listed out below:

=== Yingshi University presidents ===
See Yingshi University.

- Wu Nanxuan (吳南軒/吴南轩)
- Du Zuozhou (杜佐周)
- He Bingsong (何炳松)
- Zhou Shang (周尚)
- Yang Gongda (楊公達/杨公达)
- Tang Jihe (湯吉禾/汤吉禾)
- Deng Chuankai (鄧傳楷/邓传楷)

=== Zhejiang Provincial College of Medicine presidents ===
See Zhejiang Provincial College of Medicine.

List of presidents from 1911 to 1951:

- HAN Qingquan (韩清泉)
- ZHU Qihui (朱其辉)
- DING Qiuzhen (丁求真)
- SHENG Zaixing (盛在珩)
- LI Bao (李宝)
- WU Cui (吴粹)
- CHENG Hao (程浩)
- WANG Ji (王佶)
- CHEN Zongtang (陈宗棠)
- JIANG Kun (蒋鵾)

=== Hangchow University presidents ===
See Hangchow University or Hangchow University Historic Site.

- Rev, J. H. Judson (裘德生); American citizen
- E.J. Mattox (王令赓) 1914–1916; American citizen
- Warren H. Stuart (司徒华林) 1916–1922; American citizen, young brother of John L. Stuart
- Robert F. Fitch (1873–1954; 费佩德) 1922–1931; American citizen
- Baen E. Lee (李培恩) 1931–1949; American citizen
- Li Zhaohuan (黎照寰)
