= Li Hsi-mou =

Chinese educator, electrical engineer and politician

Li Hsi-mou (Chinese: 李熙謀; Wade–Giles: Li Hsi-mou; 11 October 1896 – 26 February 1975) was a notable Chinese educator, electrical engineer, and politician in Taiwan.

== Biography ==
Li was born in Jiashan, Jiangxi, Zhejiang province, Qing Dynasty China. Li's courtesy name was Zhenwu (振吾). Li studied electrical engineering at Shanghai Industrial and Vocational College (上海工業專門學校). Li later was qualified and obtained Zhejaing provincial finance support to study in the United States.

Li obtained S.M. in electrical engineering from the Massachusetts Institute of Technology in 1918. After obtaining PhD from Harvard University, Li went back to China.

Li taught at Jinan University (then in Shanghai) and Zhejiang University in Hangzhou of Zhejiang. Li was the provost and department chair of Jinan University. Invited by Zhejaing University president Coching Chu, Li joined Zhejiang University faculty and was the first Dean of its School of Engineering. Li was also the Provost of Zhejiang University. In 1928, Li also became the first director of Zhejiang Telephone Exchange Bureau (浙江電話局) and the director of Zhejiang Broadcasting Station.

In October 1934, Li along with Wang Guosong and Zhang Tingjin (張廷金) co-founded the Chinese Society for Electrical Engineering.

In 1941, due to Japanese invasion during the Second Sino-Japanese War, the Chiao Tung University in Shanghai had to move to the war-time capital of China – Chongqing. Li was appointed the Provost of Chiao Tung University. After the war, Li kept his professor position at Chiao Tung University and was the vice-director of Shanghai Education Bureau (上海市教育局).

In 1948, Li was elected Representative of the First National Congress of Constitution of the Republic of China (第一屆國民大會第一次會議). In 1949, Li was a representative of UNESCO for China stationed in Japan.

In 1953, Li went to Taipei, Taiwan, and became the president of Taiwan Provincial Museum. Li was the executive secretary of the Atomic Energy Council of Executive Yuan. Li was a director and standing member of the Education Committee of the Ministry of Education of Taiwan. In 1958, invited by the Minister Mei Yi-chi, Li served for the Vice-minister of the Ministry of Education. Li was the first to third director of the Institute of Electronics of National Chiao Tung University (NCTU) in Hsinchu. In 1967, Li retired from NCTU. In 1970, Li became the Dean of the College of Science of Soochow University.

In 1975, Li died at home at age 79 in Taipei.
