= Nanhai Academy =

Cultural and educational institution in Taipei, Taiwan

Coordinates: 25.03196°N 121.51142°E

Nanhai Academy 南海學園
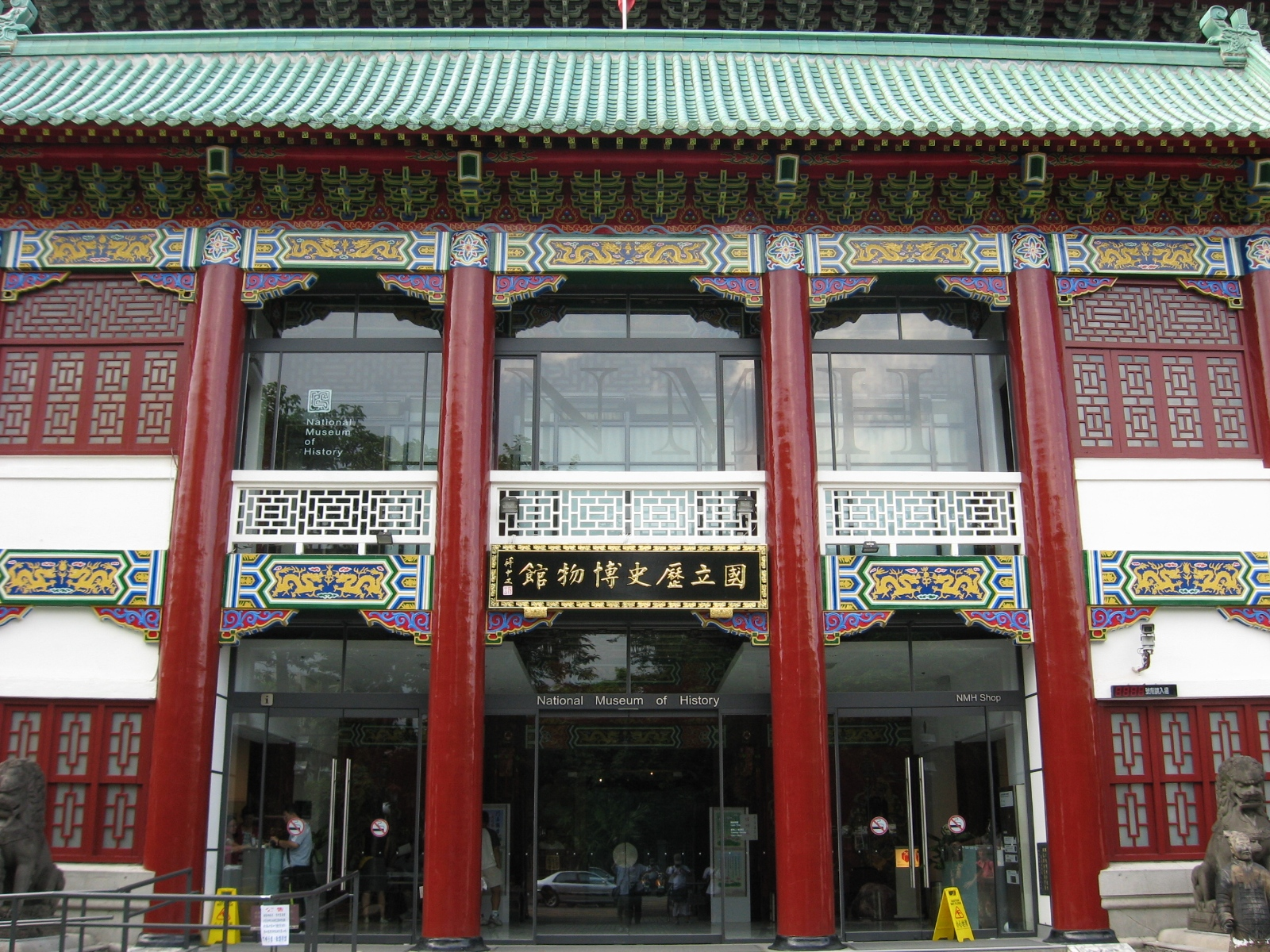
- National Museum of History in the Nanhai Academy.
- Established: 1955
- Location: Taipei, Taiwan

The Nanhai Academy (Chinese: 南海學園; pinyin: Nánhǎi Xuéyuán) is a collection of cultural and educational facilities located on Nanhai Road in the Zhongzheng District of Taipei, Taiwan.

== History ==
After the Republic of China Government relocated to Taiwan following the Chinese Civil War, President Chiang Kai-shek ordered its construction. The Ministry of Education and Chang Chi-yun planned the construction of five major social institutions located around the Taipei Botanical Garden. The majority of buildings were originally built during the Japanese occupation of Taiwan and were converted to a traditional Chinese architectural appearance during the 1950s and 1960s.

== Campus facilities ==
=== Academic institutions ===
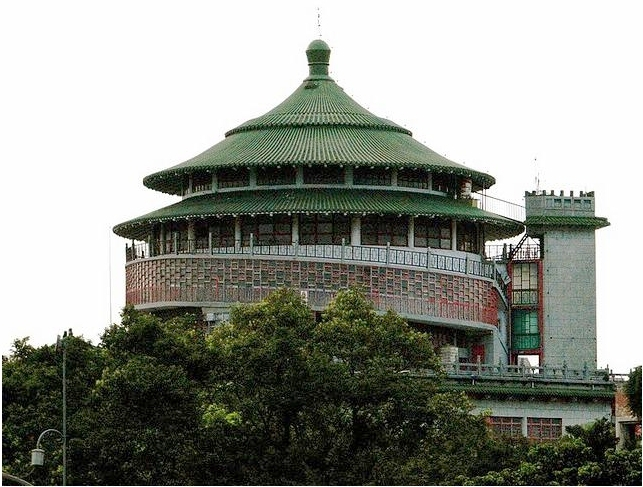
Chinese-style roof of the original National Taiwan Science Education Center building.

- Original National Taiwan Science Education Center building (currently under renovation)
- National Education Radio
- National Museum of History
- Taipei Municipal Jianguo High School
- Taipei Mandarin Experimental Elementary School
- National Taiwan Arts Education Center building
- Original National Central Library building, now also houses part of the National Taiwan Arts Education Center

=== Government agencies ===
- Council of Agriculture
- Chunghwa Postal Museum
- Forestry Museum

=== Cultural institutions ===
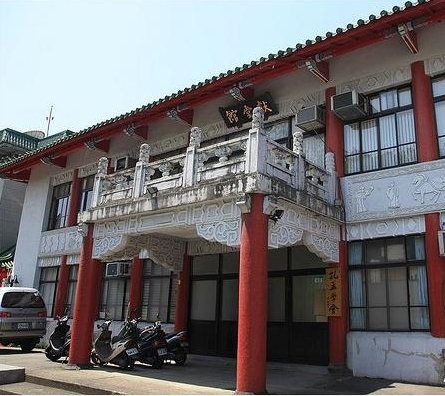
Confucius-Mencius Society of the Republic of China

- Taipei Botanical Garden
- Former residence of Yen Chia-kan
- Former residence of Sun Yun-suan
- Freedom House
- Harmony House
- Yuyu Yang Museum
- Guling Street Avant-garde Theatre
- Confucius-Mencius Society of the Republic of China

== Transportation ==
The academy is accessible within walking distance East from Wanhua Station of Taiwan Railway.. In the future, it will be near the Taipei Botanical Garden metro station, on the Wanda–Shulin line of the Taipei Metro.

== See also ==
- Sinicization
- History of the Kuomintang cultural policy
- Chinese Cultural Renaissance
- Chen Daqi
