= Hangzhou No. 4 High School =

- 杭州第四中学

Location
- 436 Sha 6th Street; Hangzhou, Zhejiang, 310018; China

Information
- Type: Public high school
- Motto: Chinese: 正直、儉樸、尚禮、揚善
- Established: 1899
- Gender: Co-educational
- Publication: Hangzhou Sizhong (杭州四中)
- Website: www.hz4z.cn

Chinese name
- Traditional Chinese: 杭州第四中學
- Simplified Chinese: 杭州第四中学
Transcriptions
Standard Mandarin
- Hanyu Pinyin: Hángzhōu Dì'sì Zhōngxué

Hangzhou No. 4 High School (Chinese: 杭州第四中学) is a public, co-educational, high school in Hangzhou, Zhejiang, China. It was established in 1899 by Lin Qi as one of the earliest-founded high schools in Hangzhou. Currently, it is one of the most elite high schools in Zhejiang Province.

== Notable alumni ==
- Chen Shutong(陳叔通), politician, representative to the National Assembly, chairman of the Commercial Press and The National Commercial Bank, and vice-chairman of both the National People's Congress and the Chinese People's Political Consultative Conference.
- Ma Xulun(馬敘倫), politician, activist, and linguist, one of the co-founders of the China Association for Promoting Democracy, early member of the Tongmenghui, professor at Peking University, director of education of Zhejiang Province, Minister of Education in 1949 and Minister of Higher Education in 1952, vice-president of the 4th Chinese People's Political Consultative Conference, and academician of Chinese Academy of Sciences.
- Jiang Menglin(蔣夢麟), educator, writer, and politician, President of Peking University and Zhejiang University, head of the Sino-American Joint Commission on Rural Reconstruction, Minister of Education and General Secretary of Executive Yuan.
- Jin Yong(金庸) GMB OBE, novelist and essayist who co-founded the Hong Kong daily newspaper Ming Pao.
- Li Linsi(厉麟似), educator, diplomat and scholar, diplomatic consultant to Chiang Kai-shek, co-founder of the China branch of the United Nations and China Institute of World Cultural Cooperation at the League of Nations.
- Lin Shu(林紓), scholar, most famous for his introducing Western literature to a whole generation of Chinese readers.
- Pan Tianshou(潘天壽), artist, director and professor of China Academy of Art.
- Qian Jiazhi(錢家治), educator.
- Wu Fuzhi(吳弗之), artist, professor of China Academy of Art.
- Shen Yinmo(沈尹默), poet and calligrapher.
- Yu Dafu(郁達夫), writer and poet.
- Xu Zhimo(徐志摩), writer and poet.
