= Lin Qi =

Lin Qi may refer to:

- Lin Qi (politician) (林启; 1839–1900), Chinese politician and educator
- Lin Qi (businessman) (林奇; 1981–2020), Chinese businessman, founder of Yoozoo Games
