= Ho Ping-sung =

Chinese educator, writer and historian

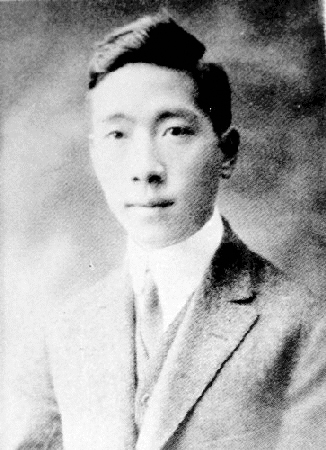
Ho Ping-sung

Ho Ping-sung (a.k.a. He Bingsong; Chinese: 何炳松, 1890–1946) was a Chinese historian.

== Biography ==
Ho was born in Houxi Village, Jinhua, Zhejiang Province in 1890. In 1911, Ho graduated from Zhejiang Advanced College (浙江高等学堂, current Zhejiang University) in Hangzhou.

In 1912, Ho went to the United States and studied mainly modern history, economics and international politics. Ho obtained his BA from the University of Wisconsin–Madison and a PhD from Princeton University (in 1916).

In 1917, Ho went back to China. Ho was a professor of history at Peking University. Ho was the head of English department of Beijing Advanced Normal School (北京高等师范学校, current Beijing Normal University). Ho was the president of the University of Politics and Law (政法大学, a root of current Peking University). Ho was the president of Zhejiang Provincial 1st Normal School (浙江省立第一师范, current Zhejiang Normal University), and the president of Zhejiang Provincial 1st Middle School (浙江省立第一中学, current Hangzhou High School).

In 1935, Ho was appointed the President of Jinan University (then in Shanghai). In June 1946, Ho was appointed the President of National Yingshi University (a root of current comprehensive Zhejiang University). On 25 July 1946, Ho died in Shanghai. Ho was buried in his hometown Jinhua.

Ho's cousin, Ping-ti Ho was also a historian who became "the first Asian-born scholar ever to have been elected as President of the Association for Asian Studies".

== Works by Ho ==
Ho was an influential writer and historian. He published numerous books and articles about history, including (books):

- 《通史新义》(The New Meaning of General History)
- 《新史学》 (The New Historiography)
- 《历史研究法》 (The Methodology of History Research)
- 《历史教育法》
- 《西洋史学史》 (The History of Western Historiography)
- 《中古欧洲史》 (The Middle Ages)
- 《秦始皇帝》 (Qin Shi Huang)
- 《近世欧洲史》 (Modern European History)
- 《浙东学派溯源》 (The Origin of East Zhejiang School) (Note: East Zhejiang School or East Zhe School was a philosophical school in China's history)
- 《程朱辩异》 (The Difference between Cheng and Zhu's Philosophies)
