= Anzhong Science and Technology Promotion Fund =

The Anzhong Science and Technology Promotion Fund (Traditional Chinese: 安中科技獎勵基金; Simplified Chinese: 安中科技奖励基金), is a fund of Zhejiang University mainly for promoting scientific research and technological innovation.

== Introduction ==
The fund is based on the donation from the famous Hong Kong–based industrialist Zhao Anzhong (趙安中 / 赵安中), who was a Zhejiang native (birthplace Ningbo).

Mr. Zhao donated 14 million Chinese Yuan to Zhejiang University in 2005. The Zhejiang University General Secretary Zhang Xi and the President Pan Yunhe received the endowment on behalf of the university, and a ceremony was also held.

One part of the fund was to build a new building for the Zhejiang University College of Biomedical Engineering and Instrument Science. The building was finished in 2007, and is named after Mr. Zhao. The rest of the fund is for promoting the scientific research and technological innovation at Zhejiang University.

A recently finished (also in 2007) teaching building is also named after Mr. Zhao, the building currently belongs to the Zhejiang University College of Civil Engineering and Architecture.
