= Jiang Menglin =

Chinese academic

- 蔣夢麟
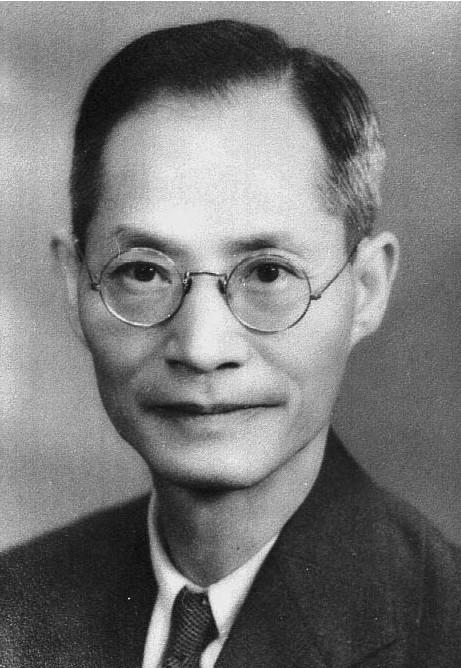
- Born: Jiang Mengxiong (蔣夢熊); 20 January 1886; Yuyao, Zhejiang, Qing China
- Died: 19 June 1964 (aged 78); Taipei, Taiwan
- Education: University of California, Berkeley (LLB); Columbia University (PhD)

Jiang Mengxiong (traditional Chinese: 蔣夢熊; simplified Chinese: 蒋梦熊; pinyin: Jiǎng Mèngxióng), better known as Jiang Menglin (traditional Chinese: 蔣夢麟; simplified Chinese: 蒋梦麟; pinyin: Jiǎng Mènglín, also romanized as Chiang Monlin; 20 January 1886 – 19 June 1964), was a Chinese educator, writer, and politician. He served as president of Peking University on and off for a long period and also held various positions in the Nationalist Government, including that of Minister of Education.

== Biography ==
Jiang Mengxiong was born in Yuyao, Ningbo, Zhejiang on 20 January 1886. He received an old-style private Chinese education in his early years, but he strongly disliked this method of education, believing it to be nothing more than rote memorization. He later studied at Zhejiang Advanced College (浙江高等学堂; now Zhejiang University) in Hangzhou, and changed his name to Jiang Menglin while he was a student there. In 1904, he was admitted to Nan Yang Public School, where he studied for four years. In 1908, he went to the United States and studied at the University of California, Berkeley. At first, he majored in agriculture, and then he turned to pedagogy. In 1912, after completing his studies at the University of California, Berkeley, he decided to continue his education at Columbia University. While studying at Columbia, Jiang came to understand the university's pragmatist educational philosophy. Under the guidance of John Dewey, William Heard Kilpatrick, and others, Jiang submitted his doctoral dissertation, "A Study in Chinese Principles of Education," in 1917.

After completing his doctoral studies, he returned to China and was hired as an editor at the Commercial Press. In 1919, students in Beijing protested China's diplomatic failure at the Paris Peace Conference, leading to the outbreak of the May Fourth Movement. Although Cai Yuanpei, then president of Peking University, sympathized with the students, Cai chose to resign and handed over administrative authority to Jiang.

In 1928, the Nationalist Government was established in Nanjing, and Jiang was appointed both Minister of Education and President of Zhejiang University. That same year, he chose to step down as president of Zhejiang University to devote himself fully to his duties at the Ministry of Education. In 1930, Jiang resigned as Minister of Education because he disagreed with the education policies. Prior to that, Cai Yuanpei had been nominally reinstated but had not actually resumed management of Peking University. The university had previously been led by Chen Daqi, and upon his return to Peking University, Jiang succeeded Chen in that position.

After the outbreak of the Second Sino-Japanese War, Jiang followed Peking University as it relocated to Changsha and Kunming. In June 1945, at the invitation of T. V. Soong, Jiang resigned from his position at Peking University and became general secretary of the Executive Yuan. He also served as a councilor. He held the position of general secretary until 1947.

In the wake of a series of strategic victories by the communist party, the Sino-American Joint Commission on Rural Reconstruction was established in October 1948 to study ways to improve rural productivity and living conditions. Jiang served as its chairman, and he subsequently relocated with the commission to Taiwan in 1949.

Jiang died of liver cancer in Taipei on 19 June 1964.

== See also ==
- Land Reform Museum

Academic offices
Preceded by Cai Yuanpei	President of Peking University; 1930 – 1945	Succeeded by Hu Shih
Preceded by Hu Zhuangyou	President of Zhejiang University; 1927 – 1930	Succeeded by Shao Peizi
