= Yao Youxin =

American painter (1935–1996)

Yao Youxin (1935–1996) was a Chinese-American painter and professor of fine arts.

== Biography ==
Yao Youxin (Chinese: 姚有信; pinyin: Yáo Yǒu Xìn) was born on July 12, 1935, in Shanghai, China, the son of a jewelry store clerk, Yao was the second youngest of six children. As a young child he demonstrated incredible talent in drawing figures. At 14, due to his family's declining finances, he had to quit school and work to support the family. He apprenticed to a well-known comic book (连环画) publisher in Shanghai, and began his career in book illustrations.

In 1954 Yao was accepted by the Zhejiang Academy of Fine Arts (浙江美术学院) in Hang Zhou, one of two top art colleges in the country at that time. In college, Yao majored in figure painting and studied traditional Chinese painting and calligraphy techniques under Pan Tianshou (潘天寿), a renowned artist and art educator. Yao also became interested in western style painting and received formal training in classical western art techniques and theories.

In 1959, Yao Youxin married Yang Lina (杨丽娜), a classmate of his in Zhejiang Academy of Fine Arts. After graduation in 1959 the couple moved back to Shanghai and had a career in art teaching, book illustrations and freelance artwork. Their work often required them to travel throughout the country, sometimes reaching remote countryside and minority communities. During their years of extensive traveling, Yao created a large number of drawings and paintings portraying local people of various ethnicities within their daily lives. He also won numerous competitions and awards, and had his work exhibited not only in Beijing and Shanghai, but also in Vienna of Austria, Moscow of USSR and Leipzig of East Germany.

In 1966, the Cultural Revolution broke out and Yao's life took a drastic turn. Freelance work ended. Many traditional art subjects such as landscape, still life and non-politically-themed figure painting were also banned. Many artists and intellectuals, including Yao's teacher Pan Tianshou, were persecuted and perished. In 1968 his daughter was born. To protect himself and his family. Yao left the academic community and found employment in a cable factory in Shanghai. There he continued his artistic work in the factory's Propaganda Department, painting Mao's portraits and other politically mandated artwork typical of that era. Yao's training in both western and eastern art enabled him to render lifelike portraits in the traditional ink-and-brush medium. It helped him establish a reputation as one of the leading figure painters of that time. In 1971, Yao was commissioned to create two giant ink-and-brush paintings, both of which were showcased in the Great Hall of Reception during US President Nixon's historical visit to China.

In 1972, Yao Youxin became a professional resident painter at the Shanghai China Art Academy (上海中国画院), established by the Chinese government to create and promote art "for the people". The Academy employs some of the best artists in the country, and being a member was a recognition of one's artistic talent. At the Academy Yao continued his work to serve the state's propaganda machine, until several years later, when the Cultural Revolution finally ended. As the nation recovered from over a decade of intellectual and artistic destruction, Yao found a new sense of freedom in his artistic creativity. He was once again allowed to paint subjects that were formally forbidden. He was also exposed to western works that were previously banned, and took a special interest in the art of impressionism in particular. He utilised brilliant colours and impressionist brush strokes instead of mere ink lines to create shapes and shades, a very avant garde move in the Chinese traditional-style art of that time. Yao's work was shown in many overseas exhibitions in Japan, Canada and Singapore. Meanwhile, he resumed his book illustration work, producing full coloured illustrations for the picture book Shang Shi (伤逝), based on a novella by Lu Xun (鲁迅). This book won him an award in a national book illustration competition. In 1980 The Cultural Ministry of the People's Republic of China conferred the title "Renowned Chinese Painter"(著名画家) to Yao, granting him a status among the top Chinese artists in the country.

Despite his success, Yao Youxin yearned for the world outside China. He wanted to visit museums abroad and see the works of masters with his own eyes. He became fascinated with western contemporary art including abstract while China at that time was still considered taboo.

In 1981, Yao migrated to the United States in search of more freedom of expression and exposure to the world art. In 1982 he entered the University of Pennsylvania's Graduate School of Fine Arts to study contemporary art. He received his Master of Fine Arts degree in 1985. Around the same time he was also teaching art to make a living. From 1982 to 1984 he was the Professor of Fine Arts in Philadelphia College of Art. In 1984 he taught at Moore College of Art as Adjunct Professor.

Between 1981 and 1983, Yao had a number of exhibitions in Japan, Singapore, Philadelphia and Aspen, Colorado. In 1987 Yao was represented by NYC's Hammer Gallery and had his solo exhibition of oil paintings there. In 1989 he had a solo exhibition at Singapore's Chinese Chamber of Commerce and Industry, showcasing Chinese style finger paintings on silk. In 1992 he had another successful solo exhibition in Singapore, with his newest collection of oil paintings including the portrait of then Prime Minister Lee Kuan Yew.

In 1988 Yao Youxin became a citizen of the US.

In his years in America Yao established a lucrative career in portrait painting. He received commissions from high-profile clients and painted portraits for Dr and Mrs. Armand Hammer, Barbara Bush, Nancy Reagan, Mrs Gorbachev and Los Angeles major Tom Bradley. Among his many portrait clients were doctors, Hollywood entertainers, businessmen and their families.

In 1995 Yao bought a house in Walton, New York and found solitude painting what he considered all the beautiful things in life in a quiet scenic hillside. He planted a lush garden and turned his horticultural creations into lively images on canvas. He also carried his portable easel and live-painted landscape of the countryside. He painted people too, especially children. He also expanded his repertoire to include jazz performances and horse races.

On June 21, 1996, Yao Youxin died from a traffic incident near his home in upstate New York shortly before his 61st birthday. He was survived by a daughter and two grandsons.
