= Zing-Yang Kuo =

Chinese psychologist (1898–1970)

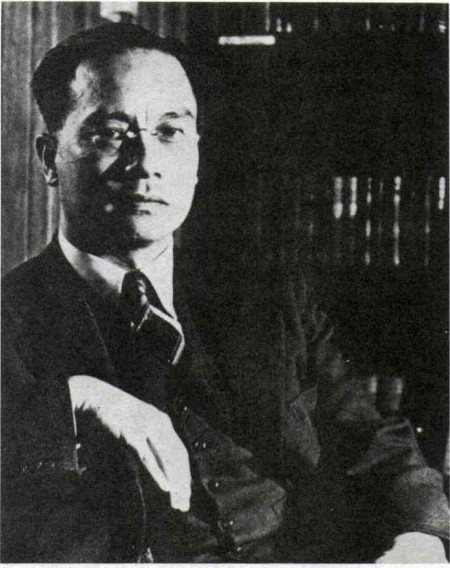
Zing-Yang Kuo

Kuo Zing-yang (or Z. Y. Kuo; simplified Chinese: 郭任远; traditional Chinese: 郭任遠; pinyin: Guō Rènyuǎn; Jyutping: Kuo Yam6 Yun5; 1898–1970) was a Chinese experimental and physiological psychologist. He was a renowned educator and is also notable as having been the President of Zhejiang University, who was expelled by Zhejiang students in 1935.

Kuo was known as "Out-Watsons Mr. Watson" in the international anti-instinct movement.

== Biography ==
Kuo was born in Shantou, Guangdong Province in 1898. Kuo studied at Fudan University in Shanghai. In 1918, Kuo went to study in the United States. In 1923, while studying at UC Berkeley, Kuo was offered the chance to earn a Ph.D. However, the school suggested he change some parts of his thesis. Rather than making those changes, Kuo chose to stick with his original work and decided not to present his thesis, which meant he couldn't earn his doctorate.

Kuo went back to China, and founded the Department of Psychology at Fudan University in 1924. Kuo was a professor, the Vice-president; and from April 1924 to November 1925, the acting President of Fudan University. From 1927 to 1936, Kuo taught at National Central University and Zhejiang University. From 1933 to 1936, Kuo was the President of Zhejiang University, and did the most important research of his academic career - about animal's behavior epigenetics.

In December 1935, the December 9th Movement broke out, which led to a large student strike in Zhejiang University. There were some severe conflicts between Kuo and some students and faculty, and Kuo was described as "autocratic" in the handling this incident. Chiang Kai-shek then intervened, leading to Kuo's resignation from his university president position.

From 1936 to 1945, Kuo was a visiting scholar to United States, and did research and lectured in several American universities. Kuo was a visiting professor of UC Berkeley, Yale University and the University of Rochester, and a researcher at Carnegie Institution in Washington, D.C..

From 1946 to 1970, Kuo resided in Kowloon, Hong Kong. In 1963, Kuo returned briefly to the United States for the 16th International Congress of Zoology and resumed his research, collaborating with Gilbert Gottlieb at his Dorothea Dix Hospital lab in Raleigh, North Carolina. Kuo was a trustee of the University of Hong Kong. Kuo died in Hong Kong on 14 August 1970 at age 72.

== Works ==
- Article: "Giving up Instincts in Psychology", The Journal of Philosophy, Vol. 18, No. 24 (Nov. 24, 1921), pp. 645-664.
- Chapter 3: From Watsonian Behaviorism to Behavior Epigenetics (by Zing-Yang Kuo).
- Book: The Dynamics of Behavior Development: An Epigenetic View; by Gilbert Gottlieb, Zing-Yang Kuo; June 1976.
- Book: The Dynamics of Behavior Development; by Zing-Yang Kuo; Random House Press, 1967.
- Book: Instinct; 1961. Princeton, NJ:Van Nostrand.

== Extra materials ==
- "To be a big shot or to be shot": Zing-Yang Kuo's other career (by Geoffrey H. Blowers, University of Hong Kong, Hong Kong)

(Using the above link will provide a new link "content.pdf" that you can use to see the full text of the article.)

- History of Psychology - Abstract
- Zing-Yang Kuo (biography)
- Robert Epstein: Comparative Psychology as the Praxist Views It; Journal of Comparative Psychology. Vol 101(3), Sep 1987, 249–253.
- Gottlieb, G. (1972): Zing-Yang Kuo: Radical scientific philosopher and innovative experimentalist (1898–1970); Journal of Comparative and Physiological Psychology, 80, 1–10.
