= Han Zhenxiang =

Chinese electrical engineer (1930–2024)

- 韩祯祥

President of Zhejiang University
- In office February 1984 – February 1988
- Preceded by: Yang Shilin
- Succeeded by: Lu Yongxiang

Personal details
- Born: 24 May 1930 Hangzhou, Zhejiang, China
- Died: 4 May 2024 (aged 93) Hangzhou, Zhejiang, China
- Party: Chinese Communist Party
- Education: Zhejiang University; Moscow Power Engineering Institute
- Scientific career
- Fields: Electrical engineering Power systems and automation
- Workplaces: Zhejiang University

Chinese name
- Simplified Chinese: 韩祯祥
- Traditional Chinese: 韓禛祥
Transcriptions
Standard Mandarin
- Hanyu Pinyin: Hán Zhēnxiáng

Han Zhenxiang (Chinese: 韩祯祥; 24 May 1930 – 4 May 2024) was a Chinese electrical engineer who served as president of Zhejiang University and of the Chinese Society for Electrical Engineering, and an academician of the Chinese Academy of Sciences. He was a member of the Chinese Communist Party.

== Biography ==
Han was born in 1930 in Hangzhou, Zhejiang, and his ancestral home was in Xiaoshan County. He attended Hangzhou High School. He obtained BEng from the Department of Electrical Engineering of Zhejiang University in Hangzhou in 1951. He further studied in Moscow, Soviet Union, and obtained his doctorate (Russian: Кандидат наук) from the Moscow Power Engineering Institute in 1961.

Han returned to China in 1961 and continued to teach at Zhejiang University. He was promoted to full professor in 1978 and to doctoral supervisor in 1981. He became director of the Department of Electrical Engineering in 1979, but having held the position for only a year. From 1980 to 1982, he was a visiting professor at Renssellier Institute of Technology and the Bonneville Power Administration. He rose to become president of Zhejiang University in February 1984, and served until February 1988. That same year, he was selected as a delegate to the 7th National People's Congress.

Han was the 3rd and 4th president of the Chinese Society for Electrical Engineering (CSEE). He was an honorary member of the society.

On 4 May 2024, Han died in Hangzhou, at the age of 93.

== Work ==
Han was a key pioneer of the large-scaled electrical networks in China. Han mainly worked on the fault diagnosis of power systems, the control and stability of electrical power systems, and the optimal design of electrical power networks.

Han was also one of the first in China to combine computer artificial intelligence with electrical power networks, and developed several computer softwares which were widely used in China for controlling and estimating electrical power systems.

== Honours and awards ==
- 1997 State Natural Science Award (Third Class) for the theoretical and methodological research on modeling, analysis, and control of DC transmission and AC-DC power systems.
- 1999 Member of the Chinese Academy of Sciences (CAS)

Educational offices
Preceded by Yang Shilin	President of Zhejiang University; 1984–1988	Succeeded by Lu Yongxiang
