= Du Zuozhou =

Du Zuozhou (Chinese: 杜佐周; pinyin: Dù Zuǒzhōu; 1895–1974) was a Chinese educator, writer and psychologist.

== Biography ==
Du was born in Dongyang, Jinhua of Zhejiang province in late Qing Dynasty China. Du's courtesy name was Jitang (纪堂). Du graduated from Zhejiang Provincial No.7 High School (presently Jinhua No.1 Middle School) in Jinhua. In 1915, Du went to Wuhan and studied at Wuchang Advanced Normal College (武昌高等师范学校; later merged into Wuhan University). Du graduated in 1919 and taught for one year at the college.

In 1920, Du went to study in the United States. Du received master and PhD from the Iowa State University, Ames, Iowa.

Du was a professor and the Dean of the School of Humanities of Wuhan University. In 1928, Du started teaching at Xiamen University in Xiamen of Fujian province, Du was a professor at Xiamen for eight years. Du was a professor and became the university provost of Jinan University in 1937.

In 1943, Du was pointed the president of the National Yingshi University (国立英士大学; a root of current Zhejiang University) in Zhejiang.

After 1949, Du was professor of several universities in Shanghai and Fujian province. Du also was the chair of education psychology department of Nanjing Normal University.

== Work ==
Du published numerous works in education and psychology in China. In 1930, Du published his book Education and School Administration (《教育与学校行政管理》) by the Commercial Press in Shanghai, this work first discriminated the educational administration (which is more governmental) and the school administration in morden China's educational system, and heavily influenced the later development of education in China.
