= Edgar Tang =

Chinese journalist

- Born: Edgar Chi-ho Tang; 1902
- Died: Unknown

Academic background
- Education: Boone University (BA); University of Missouri (BA, MA); Harvard University (MA, PhD)

Edgar Chi-ho Tang (or Tang Chi-ho, C.H. Tang, Tang Jihe; Chinese: 汤吉禾), (born 1902, date of death unknown), was an influential Chinese writer, journalist and educator.

== Early life and education ==
Tang was born in 1902 and his ancestral hometown was Jiujiang, Jiangxi Province. From 1913 to 1918 Tang studied at Saint John's School (a middle school) in Jiujiang. From 1918 to 1923 Tang studied at Boone University (文华大学) in Wuchang (current Wuhan), Hubei Province, and graduated with BA.

Tang studied at the University of Missouri, and obtained BA and MA (in 1927) in journalism. Tang shortly studied public law at the Columbia University Law School, but transferred to Harvard University. Tang obtained master's degree in 1929 and doctorate in 1932, both from Harvard.

== Career ==
From 1923 to 1925, Tang taught at Saint John's School and also was a reporter for a news agency in Shanghai. In 1925 Tang was sent to the United States by the Jiangxi Provincial Government. From 1927 to 1932 Tang also worked for Harvard University Library. In 1930 Tang lectured Chinese culture at Boston University.

After returning China Tang was appointed professor of politics at the National Central University (now Nanjing University). From 1940 to 1945 Tang was the President of Cheeloo University in Shandong Province. In June 1946 Tang became the President of National Yingshi University (a root of what is now Zhejiang University). In June 1948 Tang was resigned from the university president position due to the student strike.

Although Tang was a well known scholar in China before 1949, information about his later life is rarely seen in current mainland Chinese sources.

== Works by Tang ==
- 《中国的宪政问题》 (Problems of China's Constitution and Politics)
- 《中国审查员的建立》 (The Setup of Examinant System in China)
- 《中国的对外关系－著作文献提要》 (China's Foreign Relations - Summary of Literature)
