= Zoulu (culture) =

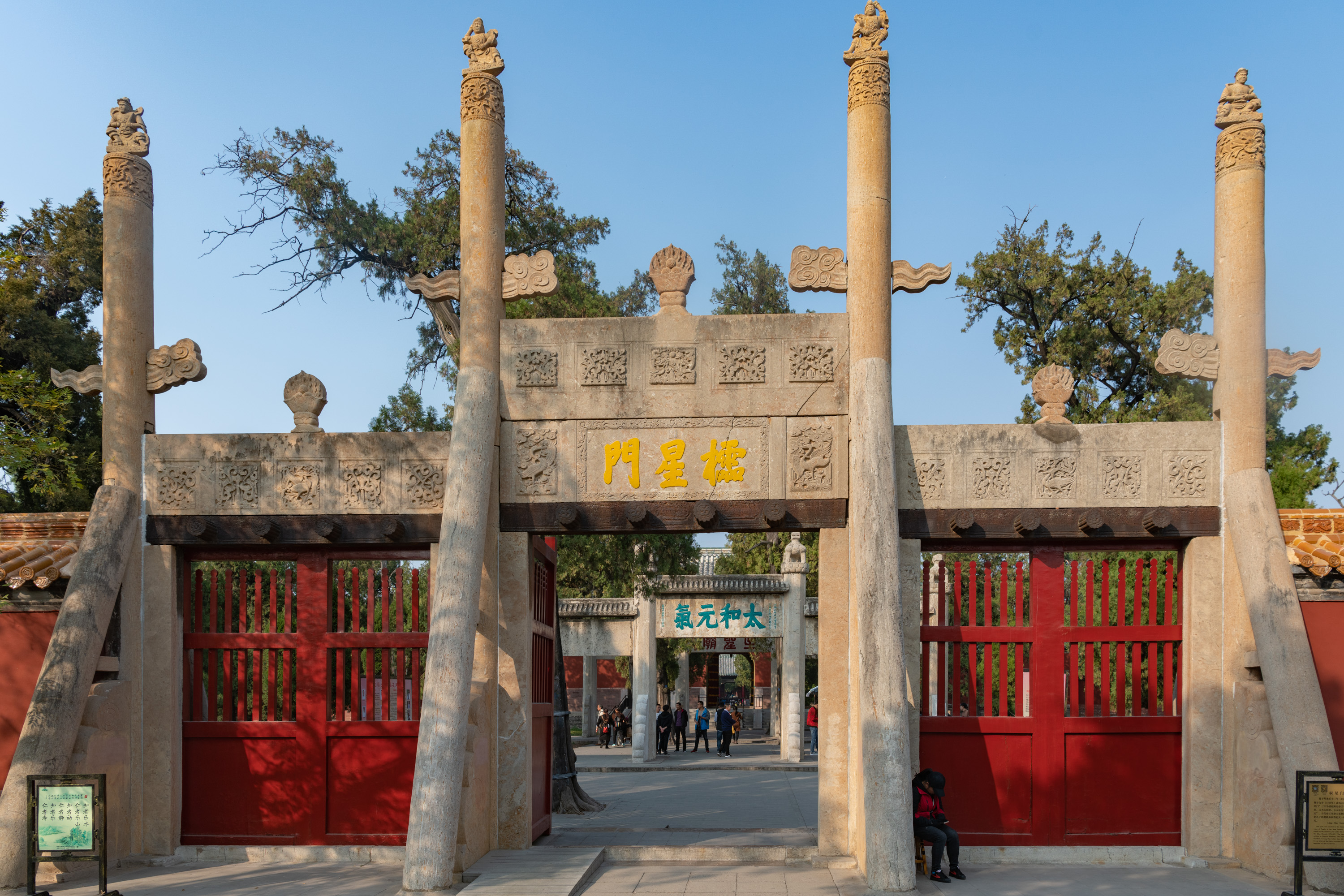
Lu, where Confucius was born

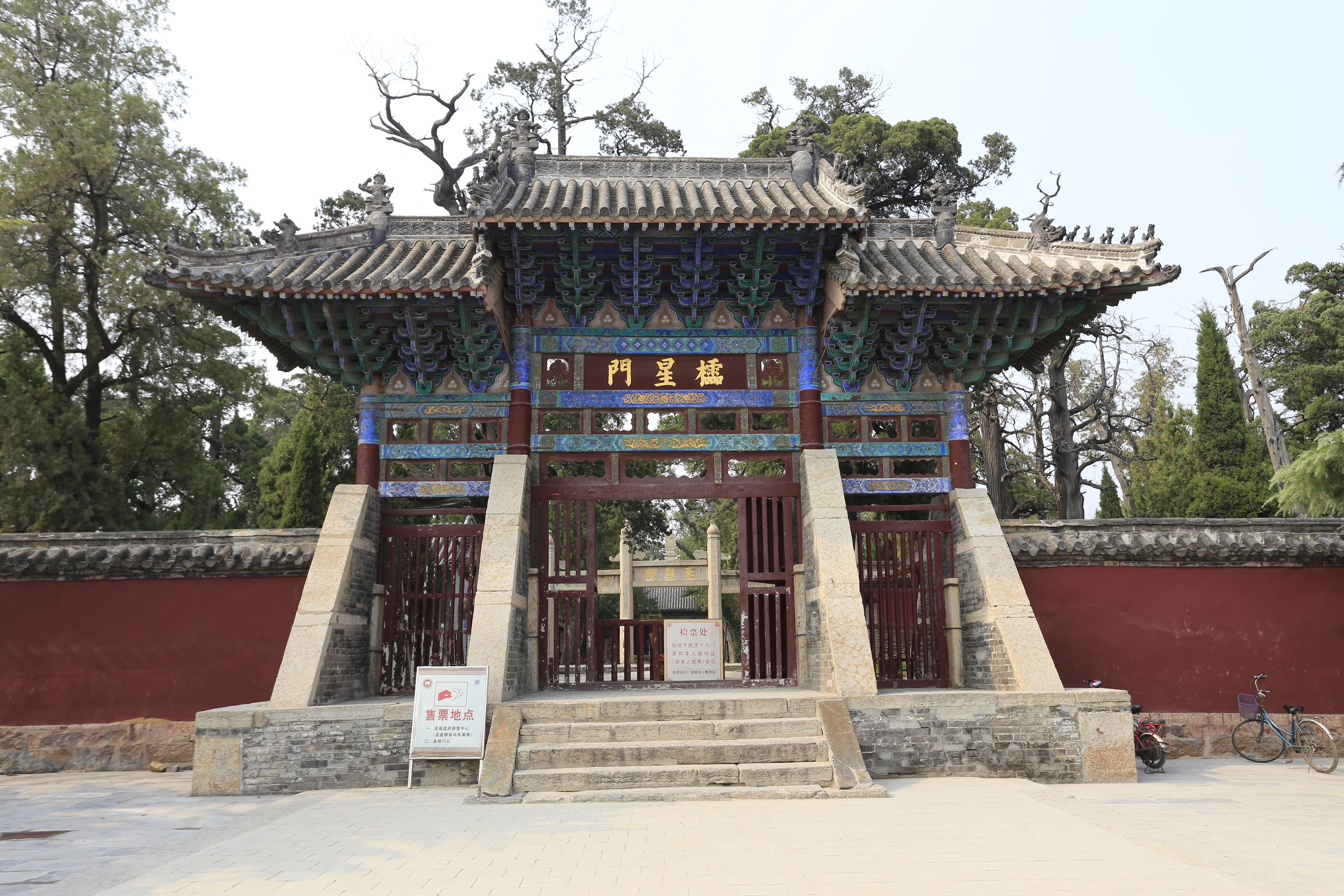
Zou, where Mencius was born

Zoulu culture (Chinese: 邹鲁文化; pinyin: Zōu Lǔ Wénhuà) refers to lands and regions of cultural prosperity. The name of Zoulu originated from the combination of the names of the states of Zou (now Zoucheng) and Lu (now Qufu), which were in modern Shandong Province, and the hometowns of great Chinese philosophers Mencius and Confucius, respectively. During Spring and Autumn period and Warring States period, the Zoulu area, due to rich relics of Yin and Dongyi cultures, and also influences from Zhou culture alone, formed a strong cultural atmosphere. As a result, Zoulu became a descriptor for regions of flourishing and prosperous cultures.

In this ancient land, many thinkers such as Yanzi, ancient craftsman Lu Ban, Zengzi, Zisi and Mozi came to this fertile soil. Their ancestors were here since prehistoric times.

== Usage ==
The first usage of "Zoulu" was by Yu Xin in his The Lament for the South (哀江南賦), describing a school became another "Zoulu". In history, the name became the synonym for places rich of culture and education. For example, the cities of the Chaoshan area (Chaozhou, Jieyang, Shantou) and Fujian area (namely Fuzhou, Putian, and Quanzhou) are referred to as the Haibin Zoulu (海滨邹鲁; 'Zoulu of the coast') and the cities in the Yangtze valley, such as Jinhua, are known as the Jiangnan Zoulu (江南邹鲁; 'Zoulu of Jiangnan'). Andong, the center of Confucianism of Korea, describes itself as Haedong Churo (Korean: 해동추로; Hanja: 海東鄒魯; RR: Haedong Churo; lit. 'Zoulu on the East of the Sea').

== Quote ==
There is a quote from Mencius: Liang Hui Wang II, 19 (孟子-梁惠王下, 19):

鄒與魯鬨。穆公問曰：「吾有司死者三十三人，而民莫之死也。誅之，則不可勝誅；不誅，則疾視其長上之死而不救，如之何則可也？」

There had been a brush between Zou and Lu, when the duke Mu asked Mencius, saying, 'Of my officers there were killed thirty-three men, and none of the people would die in their defence. If I sentence them to death for their conduct, it will be impossible to put such a multitude to death. If I do not put them to death, then there is the crime unpunished of their looking angrily on at the death of their officers, and not saving them. Which of these options is more acceptable?'

孟子對曰：「凶年饑歲，君之民老弱轉乎溝壑，壯者散而之四方者，幾千人矣；而君之倉廩實，府庫充，有司莫以告，是上慢而殘下也。曾子曰：『戒之戒之！出乎爾者，反乎爾者也。』夫民今而後得反之也。君無尤焉。君行仁政，斯民親其上、死其長矣。」

Mencius replied, 'In calamitous years and years of famine, the old and weak of your people, who have been found lying in the ditches and water-channels, and the able-bodied who have been scattered about to the four quarters, have amounted to several thousands. All the while, your granaries, 0 prince, have been stored with grain, and your treasuries and arsenals have been full, and not one of your officers has told you of the distress. Thus negligent have the superiors in your State been, and cruel to their inferiors. The philosopher Zeng said, "Beware, beware. What proceeds from you, will return to you again." Now at length the people have paid back the conduct of their officers to them. Do not you, 0 prince, blame them. If you will put in practice a benevolent government, this people will love you and all above them, and will die for their officers.'

== See also ==
- Chinese Cultural Renaissance
- Qilu culture
- Hundred Schools of Thought
