= Chunghwa Postal Museum =

Museum in Zhongzheng, Taipei, Taiwan

Postal Museum
- 郵政博物館

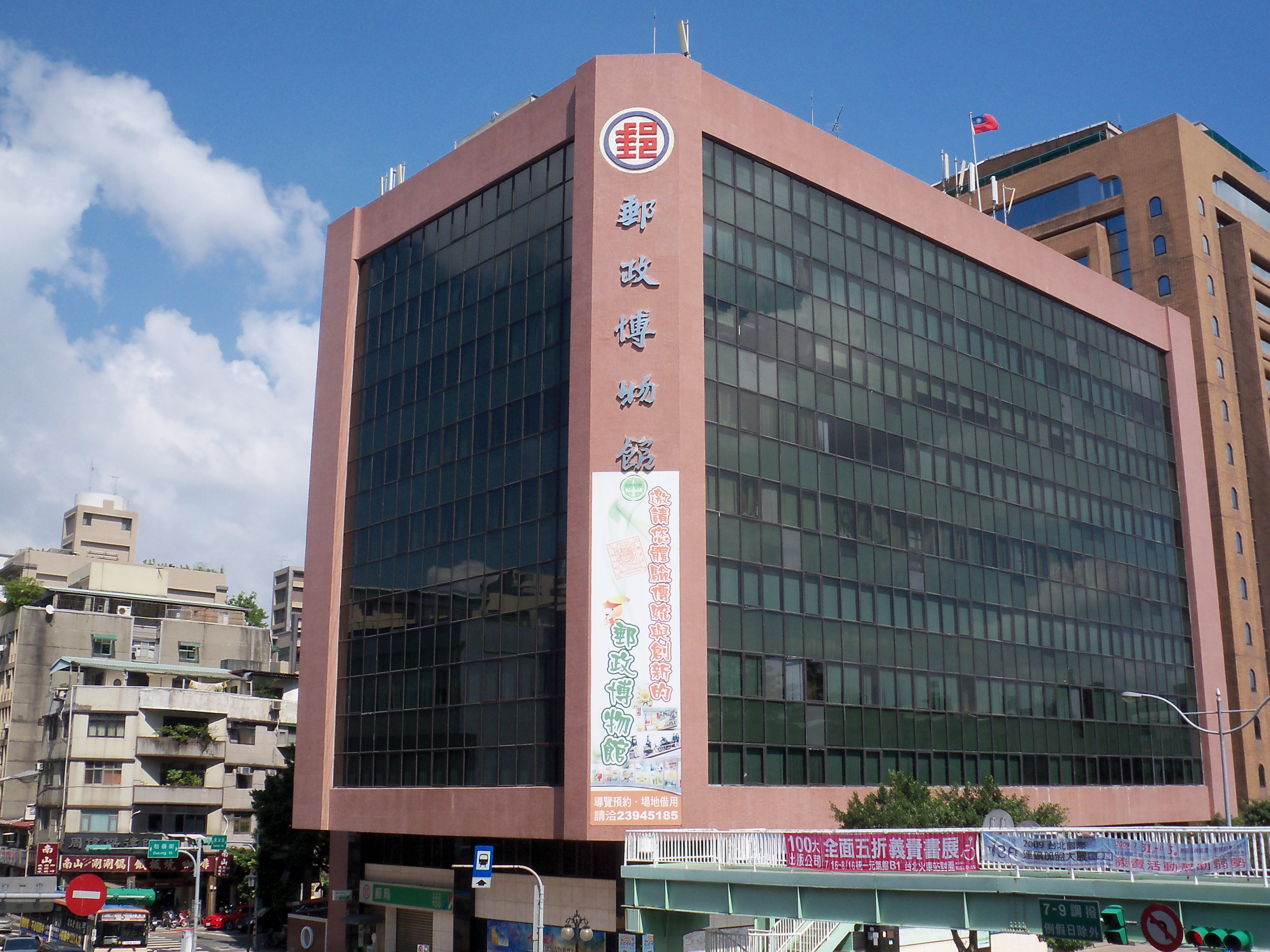
- Established: 20 March 1966 (former site); 10 October 1984 (current site)
- Location: Zhongzheng, Taipei, Taiwan
- Coordinates: 25°1′54″N 121°30′53.3″E
- Type: museum
- Owner: Chunghwa Post
- Website: museum.post.gov.tw

The Postal Museum (traditional Chinese: 郵政博物館; simplified Chinese: 邮政博物馆; pinyin: Yóuzhèng Bówùguǎn) is a museum located in Zhongzheng District, Taipei, Taiwan. The museum encompasses seven floors and covers postal history, modern postal service, philately, and special exhibitions.

== History ==
The museum opened at a location in Xindian Township, Taipei County on 20 March 1966, on the 70th anniversary of Chunghwa Post. Due to remoteness of the Xindian location and the lack of space, the museum was moved to its present location in the Nanhai Academy in 1984.

== Features ==
The museum contains exhibitions about postal history and stamps, the modern postal service, as well as a special exhibition, a library, and an auditorium.

== Architecture ==
The museums spans over 10 floors.

== Transportation ==
The museum is within walking distance of the Chiang Kai-shek Memorial Hall Station of the Taipei Metro.

== See also ==
- List of museums in Taiwan
- Chunghwa Post
