= Zhou Rongxin =

Chinese politician, educator and architect

Zhou Rongxin (simplified Chinese: 周荣鑫; traditional Chinese: 周榮鑫; pinyin: Zhōu Róngxīn; Wade–Giles: Chou Jung-hsin; 1917–1976), was a Chinese politician, educator and architect. He served as Minister of Education and President of Zhejiang University.

== Biography ==
Zhou was born in Penglai, Shandong Province in April 1917. From 1975 to 1976, Zhou was the Minister of Education of the People's Republic of China. Zhou favored reinstating the entrance examination for all subjects and reducing vocational training. In the summer of 1975, he toured the country promoting these educational reforms.

From 1958 to 1962, Zhou was the President of Zhejiang University in Hangzhou. From 1965 to 1975, Zhou was the Secretary-general of the State Council of the People's Republic of China; during this period, he was an important assistant of Premier Zhou Enlai. Zhou was the first and second Director of the Chinese Architectural Society (中国建筑学会).

Zhou committed suicide after a campaign against him of persecution on 13 April 1976, at age 59, during the Cultural Revolution. His absence from the Chinese government was not noticed in the West until September 10, when his name was one of three of major officials (in addition to Railway Minister Wan Li and Xinhua Press agency director Chu Mu-chih) omitted from the list of dignitaries attending the funeral of Chairman Mao Zedong. "Mr. Chou came under attack in wall posters at Tsinghua University in Peking last December at the beginning of the anitrightist campaign," a report in The New York Times noted, "and is rumored to have died since, possibly by suicide."
