= Wu Nanxuan =

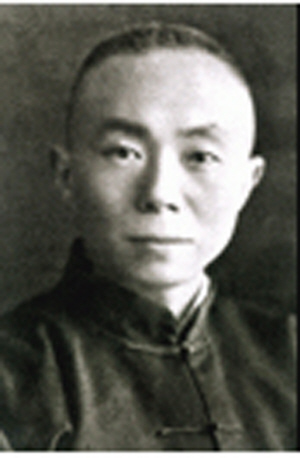
Wu Nanxuan

Wu Nanxuan (1893–1980; Chinese: 吴南轩), was a Chinese educator and psychologist, best known for his president positions of several prestigious Chinese universities.

== Biography ==
Wu's original name was Wu Mian (吴冕), and was born in Yizheng, Jiangsu Province in 1893. Wu finished his high school education in Yangzhou. In 1919, Wu graduated from Fudan University Preparatory School in Shanghai, and left to the United States to continue his study. Wu obtained MA in 1923 and PhD in 1929 both from the University of California, Berkeley.

From April 1931 to June 1931, Wu was the President of Tsinghua University in Beijing, but eventually expelled by his students and the university faculty. From May 1940 to February 1943, Wu was the President of Fudan University in Shanghai. In February 1943, Wu was pointed the President of National Yingshi University (a root of current Zhejiang University) in Zhejiang, however, Wu was immediately resigned but still kept his professorship at Fudan University.

In 1949, Wu went to Taiwan. In 1966, Wu became the Dean of the School of Humanities of the National Chengchi University in Taipei.
