= Chen Qimei =

Chinese politician (1878–1916)

- 陳其美
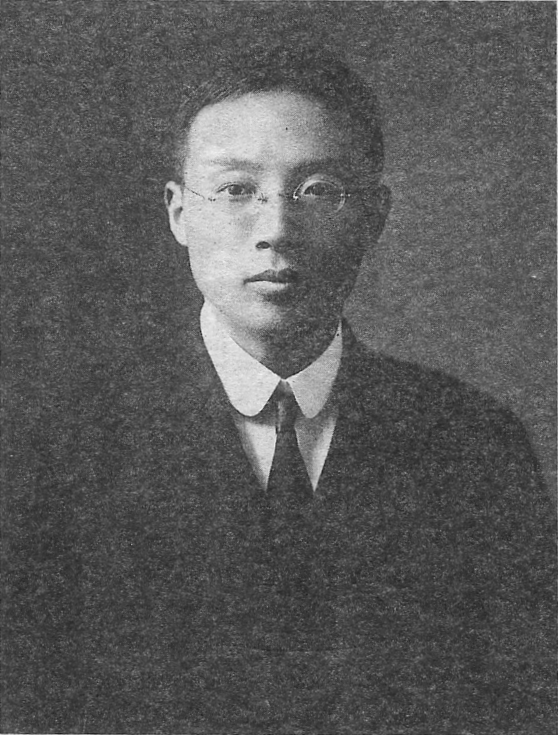
- Born: January 17, 1878; Gui'an County, Huzhou Fu, Zhejiang, Qing China (now Wuxing District, Huzhou)
- Died: May 18, 1916 (aged 38); Shanghai French Concession, Shanghai, China
- Cause of death: Assassination
- Education: Tokyo Police Academy
- Political party: Kuomintang

Chen Qimei (traditional Chinese: 陳其美; simplified Chinese: 陈其美; pinyin: Chén Qíměi; Wade–Giles: Ch'en Ch'i-mei; January 17, 1878 – May 18, 1916), courtesy name Yingshi (英士), was a Chinese revolutionary activist. He was a key figure of the Green Gang, a close political ally of Sun Yat-sen, and an early mentor of Chiang Kai-shek. He was one of the founders of the Republic of China, and the uncle of CC Clique leaders Chen Guofu and Chen Lifu.

== Life ==
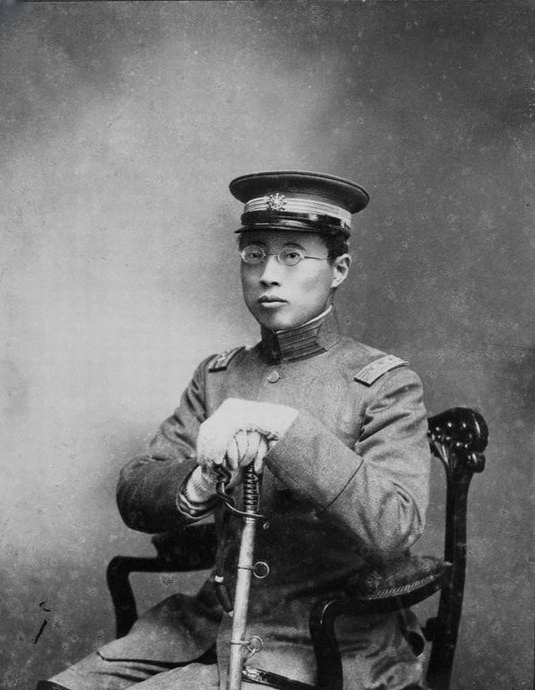
Chen Qimei

Born in modern Wuxing District, Huzhou, Zhejiang, he went to Japan to study in 1906, and joined the anti-Qing Tongmenghui. Befriended by fellow Zhejiang native Chiang Kai-shek, in 1908, Chen inducted Chiang into the Tongmenghui.

In 1911, after the Wuchang Uprising, Chen's forces occupied Shanghai. He was then made military governor of the region. He fled to Japan with Sun Yat-sen upon the failure of the 1913 Second Revolution against Yuan Shikai's dictatorship. They subsequently formed the Chinese Revolutionary Party, which later was reorganized into the Kuomintang in 1919. As Yuan prepared to declare himself emperor, Chen returned to China to organize more anti-Yuan activities, including the assassation of pro-Yuan governor of Shanghai Zheng Rucheng. As he was returning to Shanghai for another round of revolution, he was assassinated in the Shanghai French Concession on May 18, 1916. The assassination was believed to have been organized by Zhang Zongchang, on Yuan's orders.

Chen is perceived as one of the early revolutionary heroes and one of the founding fathers of the Republic of China. He was also the eldest member of which later came to be known as the Chen Family, one of the four most powerful and influential families at the time. The university which had been originally named after him has become a part of today's Fudan University and Zhejiang University after the Chinese Civil War. A monument of him is located in Huzhou, Zhejiang, China.

== See also ==
- Republic of China
- Yingshih University
