= Wang Guosong =

Chinese electrical engineer

Wang Guosong (or Kuo-Song Wang; Chinese: 王国松; 1902–1983), was a Chinese electrical engineer, and a pioneer of electrotechniques in modern China. Wang was also an educator, and best known for his acting president position of Zhejiang University in history.

== Biography ==
Wang was born in Wenzhou, Zhejiang Province in 1902, and his father was a handcraft worker. Wang graduated from Zhejiang No.10 Middle School (current Wenzhou Middle School). In 1920, Wang entered Zhejiang Industrial School (浙江公立工业专门学校; a technical school of Zhejiang University) in Hangzhou, and studied electrical engineering. Wang graduated in 1925 and became a teaching assistant in the school. In 1927/1928, Zhejiang Industrial School became the engineering faculty of Zhejiang University, Wang taught both at Zhejiang University School of Engineering and its affiliated technical schools.

In 1930, Wang went to the United States, and studied at the Graduate School of Cornell University. Wang received MS in 1931 and PhD in 1933 both from Cornell University.

Wang went back to China in Aug 1933, and later became an associate professor at the Department of Electrical Engineering of Zhejiang University. Wang was one of three main founders of the Chinese Society for Electrical Engineering (中国机电工程学会) in Oct 1934. In May 1936, Wang was pointed the head of the Department of Electrical Engineering of Zhejaing University, and promoted to professor in Aug 1937.

In Jun 1950, Wang was pointed the Vice-president of Zhejiang University. From Jun 1951 to Nov 1952, Wang served as the acting President of Zhejiang University. After Nov 1952, Wang continued as vice-president of Zhejiang University.

Wang was former Chairman of Hangzhou Association of Science and Technology. From 1978 to 1983, Wang was the Director-general of Zhejiang Society for Electrical Engineering.

Wang died in Hangzhou on 3 December 1983. The Wang Guosong Education Fund (王国松教育基金会) was founded in Nov 1996, named after his honor.
