= Zhu Zuxiang =

Chinese soil scientist and politician

Zhu Zuxiang (Chinese: 朱祖祥; a.k.a. Chu T.S. by Wade-Giles; 5 October 1916 – 18 November 1996) was a Chinese soil scientist and politician. He is considered as the founder of modern soil chemistry in China.

== Life ==
Zhu was born in Cixi City (current Yuyao), Zhejiang on 5 October 1916. In 1934, Zhu graduated from Ningbo Xiaoshi Middle School. In 1938, Zhu graduated from the School of Agricultural Sciences of Zhejiang University. In 1946, Zhu earned MSc from Michigan State University (MSU), United States. In 1948, Zhu obtained PhD from MSU.

In 1948, Zhu went back to China and joined the faculty of Zhejiang University. Zhe was a professor and later the Dean of the School of Agricultural Sciences of Zhejiang University.

From 1952-1953, due to the Adjustment for University Colleges and Departments (中国高校院系调整), Zhejiang University was dissociated, and its School of Agricultural Sciences became the independent Zhejiang Agricultural College (ZJAC). Later, the Zhejiang Agricultural College was promoted to Zhejiang Agricultural University (ZJAU) (in 1998, ZJAU was re-merged into Zhejiang University). Zhu was transferred to be a professor at ZJAC in 1952. Zhu was the head of the Department of Soil and Agricultural Chemistry at ZJAC and later ZJAU. Zhu was pointed to be the Vice-president and later the President of Zhejiang Agricultural University (ZJAU).

Zhu systemically studied the soil chemistry and physics in China. Zhu was also a pioneer of studying soil pollution and maintenance in China. Zhu was elected an academician of the Chinese Academy of Sciences in 1980.

Zhu died in Shaoxing, Zhejiang on 18 November 1996, during an inspection of local agricultural development.

== Positions ==
Academic:

- The 1st President of China National Rice Research Institute (CNRRI) (the most prestigious rice research institute in China)
- The 1st President of China Institute of Water Resources and Hydropower Research (CIWRHR) (also the most prestigious research institute in related domains in China)
- President, Zhejiang Provincial Association of Science and Technology
- President, Zhejiang Agricultural University

Political:

- The Head of Jiusan Society Zhejiang Branch

== Monography ==
Zhu published more than 90 papers and books both in English and Chinese, some significant works are like below:

- Agrology (monography in Chinese)
- Soil Chemistry (monography in Chinese)
