= Pan Yunhe =

Chinese AI specialist (born 1946)

- 潘云鹤

Director of the Foreign Affairs Committee of the National Committee of the Chinese People's Political Consultative Conference
- In office March 2013 – March 2018
- Preceded by: Zhao Qizheng
- Succeeded by: Lou Jiwei

Executive Vice-President of Chinese Academy of Engineering
- In office June 2006 – June 2014
- President: Xu Kuangdi; Zhou Ji

President of Zhejiang University
- In office May 1995 – June 2006
- Preceded by: Lu Yongxiang
- Succeeded by: Yang Wei

Personal details
- Born: 4 November 1946 (age 79) Hangzhou, Zhejiang, China
- Party: Chinese Communist Party
- Education: Tongji University; Zhejiang University

Chinese name
- Simplified Chinese: 潘云鹤
- Traditional Chinese: 潘雲鶴
Transcriptions
Standard Mandarin
- Hanyu Pinyin: Pān Yúnhè

Pan Yunhe (Chinese: 潘云鹤; born November 4, 1946) is a Chinese specialist in artificial intelligence and geographic information systems. He served as President of Zhejiang University and Vice President of the Chinese Academy of Engineering.

== Early life ==
Pan, a native of Zhejiang Province, graduated from Tongji University, and received a master's degree from Zhejiang University. He is a professor of computer science at Zhejiang University, and he took the office of the president there in 1995. He became a member of the Chinese Academy of Engineering in 1997.

Pan did his undergraduate study at Tongji University in Shanghai, and his postgraduate study at Zhejiang University in Hangzhou. From 1995 to 2006, he was the president of Zhejiang University. He was appointed vice-president of the Chinese Academy of Engineering on June 7, 2006.

Educational offices
Preceded by Lu Yongxiang	President of Zhejiang University; 1995–2006	Succeeded by Yang Wei
Assembly seats
Preceded by Zhao Qizheng	Director of the Foreign Affairs Committee of the National Committee of the Chinese People's Political Consultative Conference; 2013–2018	Succeeded by Lou Jiwei
