= Chen Daqi =

Chinese psychologist (1886–1983)

- Traditional Chinese: 陳大齊
- Simplified Chinese: 陈大齐
Transcriptions
Standard Mandarin
- Hanyu Pinyin: Chén Dàqí
- Wade–Giles: Ch'en Ta-ch'i

Courtesy name
- Chinese: 百年
Transcriptions
Standard Mandarin
- Hanyu Pinyin: Báinián
- Wade–Giles: Pai-nien

Chen Daqi (Chinese: 陳大齊; 1886–1983), traditionally romanised as Ch'en Ta-ch'i, was a Chinese psychologist, philosopher, politician, and writer. He was a pioneer of modern psychology in China. Chen was a former President of Zhejiang University, and acting President of Peking University.

== Biography ==
Chen was born in Haiyan County, Zhejiang Province in 1886. Chen finished his elementary study in a local school of his hometown, and studied English in Shanghai. In 1901, Chen entered Zhejiang Qiushi Academy (current Zhejiang University) in Hangzhou. In 1903, Chen went to study in Japan. Chen first studied in Sendai, but later entered the Tokyo Imperial University (now the University of Tokyo). Chen studied philosophy, majored in psychology, and graduated BA in 1912.

In 1912, Chen went back to China after graduation. From 1912 to 1913, Chen was the president of Zhejiang Advanced College, current Zhejiang University, in Hangzhou. Chen was also a professor of Zhejiang School of Law and Politics.

Chen was a strong supporter of May Fourth Movement. He was also a close friend of Lu Xun. Chen believed that science was a means of "saving the nation" and viewed superstition, including practices like spirit writing and the belief in supernatural entities, as obstacles to the country. Chen contended that the discipline of psychology was a solution to the "superstition problem" because as a means of analyzing mental processes, it could "prove that superstitions are in many regards irrational" and prompt people to "realize the origin of superstition".

From 1922 to 1927, Chen was a professor, the head of the Department of Philosophy of Peking University in Beijing. From 1927 to January 1928, Chen was the Provost of Peking University. From 6 November 1928 to 30 December 1929, Chen was the Secretary-general of the Examination Yuan of the Central Government of ROC. In 1929, Chen was the dean of the arts faculty of Peking University. From 1929 to January 1931, Chen was the acting President of Peking University. From 10 December 1930 to 22 December 1932 and from 10 to 27 January 1942, Chen served the Secretary-general of Examination Yuan. In July 1948, Chen start serving as a senior advisor of national policy for government.

After 1949, Chen went to Taiwan. Chen served the first President of National Chengchi University (NCCU) from October 1954 to July 1959. In April 1964, Chen became the first director-general of the Confucius-Mencius Society in Taipei at the Nanhai Academy.

Chen died in Taiwan on 8 January 1983.

== Works ==
Chen was an influential educator, writer, educator, Confucian philosopher and psychologist. Chen published more than 20 monographs. His 1918 book A General Outline of Psychology (心理学大纲) is the first modern textbook of psychology in China. Chen also translated many German psychological works, thus he was also a well-known translator.
