= Zheng Xiaocang =

Chinese writer, translator, and educator

Zheng Xiaocang (1892–1979; Chinese: 郑晓沧) was a Chinese writer, translator, and educator. He is well known for his large publications about education in China. Zheng was a former acting president of Zhejiang University, and former president of Zhejiang Normal University.

== Biography ==
Zheng was born in September 1892 in Haining County, Jiaxing, Zhejiang Province. In June 1912, Zheng graduated from Zhejiang Advanced College (current Zhejiang University) in Hangzhou. In June 1914, Zheng graduated from Tsinghua School (current Tsinghua University) in Beijing. Zheng went to the United States to continue his study. Zheng first studied at the University of Wisconsin–Madison (BA) then at Columbia University. Zheng obtained MA (some sources indicate as PhD) from Columbia University.

In 1918, Zheng returned to China. Zheng was a professor of education at Nanjing Normal University and Southeast University. Zheng served the Dean of the School of Education of National Central University (current Nanjing University in Nanjing, Jiangsu Province) for ten years.

From June 1928, Zheng taught at Zhejiang University. Zheng founded the department of education at Zhejiang University. Zheng was the head of the education department of Zhejiang University, then the Dean of School of Education. Zheng was also the head of Graduate School, the Provost, and the acting President of Zhejiang University (from February to April 1936).

In 1952, the old Zhejiang University was split, and the new Hangzhou Normal College (杭州师范学院; later promoted to Hangzhou University; and Hangzhou University was re-merged into Zhejiang University in 1998; this Hangzhou Normal School is totally different from current Hangzhou Normal University) was established from the faculties and resources of Zhejiang University. Zheng was pointed professor of Hangzhou University and Zhejiang Normal College (current Zhejiang Normal University). In 1962, Zheng was appointed the president of Zhejiang Normal University.

Zheng was the honorary president of Zhejiang Education Society (浙江省教育学会). Zheng was a standing member of the China Association for Promoting Democracy Central Committee.

On 12 March 1979, Zheng died in Hangzhou.

== Translation work ==
Zheng is also well known for his translation of American novels, especially his translation of Louisa May Alcott's works (including the Little Women, Little Men, etc.) are still considered as high quality and the best version.
