= Yingshih University =

Former university in Chekiang, China

National Yingshih University (Traditional Chinese: 國立英士大學, Simplified Chinese: 国立英士大学), or shortly Yingshih University and formerly Provincial Yingshih University (Traditional Chinese: 省立英士大學, Simplified Chinese: 省立英士大学) and Chekiang Provincial Wartime University (Traditional Chinese: 浙江戰時大學, Simplified Chinese: 浙江战时大学), was a defunct university of Chekiang Province, China. The university was named after Chinese revolutionary activist Chen Qimei and was opened as a wartime university in Chekiang, since 1937.

== Brief history ==
Established as Zhejiang Wartime University in November 1938 in response to the escalating Sino-Japanese War in Zhejiang, the university formally opened in February 1939. In honour of Chinese revolutionary activist Chen Qimei, also known by his courtesy name Chen Yingshi, the university was renamed as Provincial Yingshi University in May 1938. In December 1942, the National Southeastern Associated University, which was formed by the association of National Jinan University, Private Shanghai Academy of Fine Arts, Private Shanghai College of Law and Private Utopia University, joined Yingshi, promoting Yingshi to be a national university, until its dissociation in 1949.

In August 1949, during the Chinese Civil War, the Jinhua Civic Military Control Committee (金華市軍管會/金华市军管会) controlled the university and further dissociated it. Many of its faculties joined the Zhejiang University, and most of its students who wanted to continue their educations were transferred into the Zhejiang University.

== List of presidents ==
- Wu Nanxuan (吳南軒/吴南轩)
- Du Zuozhou (杜佐周)
- He Bingsong (何炳松)
- Zhou Shang (周尚)
- Yang Gongda (楊公達/杨公达)
- Tang Jihe (湯吉禾/汤吉禾)

== See also ==
- Chen Qimei
- Second Sino-Japanese War
