= Shao Peizi =

Shao Peizi (Chinese: 邵裴子; 1884–1968) was a Chinese calligrapher, seal artist, educator, and economist. Shao was twice President of Zhejiang University.

== Biography ==
Shao was born in Hangzhou, the capital of Zhejiang Province, in 1884 Qing Dynasty China. Shao's birthname was Wentai (闻泰), and also known as Changguang (长光). Shao studied English and economics at Nanyang Public School (南洋公学; main root of current Shanghai Jiao Tong University) in Shanghai. After graduation Shao went to USA and studied economics at Stanford University, which he graduated BA in 1909.

In the first year of Xuantong Era (1909), Shao went back to China, and became a lecturer of English at Zhejiang Advanced College (current Zhejiang University) in Hangzhou. He later became provost and then president of the college.

In 1913, Shao went to Beijing and served as a senior official in the Minister of Finance. He was also a professor of English and the provost of the University of Law and Politics (法政大学) in Beijing.

Just before the Northern Expedition, Shao again went back to Hangzhou, became a professor and later the dean of the School of Science and Arts at Zhejiang University. In November 1928, Shao became the Vice-president of Zhejiang University (then called National 3rd Sun Yat-sen University). From July 1930 to November 1931, Shao served the President of Zhejiang University.

When Chiang Kai-shek was inspecting Zhejiang University, Shao was encouraged to join Kuomintang, which was refused by Shao. Shao was squeezed out by Kuomintang Central Club and left Zhejiang University in 1935, but still lived in Hangzhou.

Shao later worked for the Commercial Press in Shanghai. During the Second Sino-Japanese War, Shao served senator of Zhejiang Provincial Government, and was a director of the board of Zhejiang Bank.

After 1949, Shao was the Director-general of Zhejiang Cultural Relic Management Committee (浙江省文物管理委员会). Shao was a standing member and later director of the Revolutionary Committee of the Kuomintang Zhejiang Branch. Shao was the Vice-president of Zhejiang Research Institute of Literature and History (浙江省文史研究馆). Shao was a member of both Chinese People's Political Consultative Conference and National People’s Congress.

== Art ==
Shao was a famous calligraphist and seal maker in China. He was quite accomplished in both regular script and semi-cursive script. His style is described as deep, powerful, clear, and smart (沉雄清灵), and is considered close to Li Beihai (李北海)'s style.
