= Hu Zhuangyou =

Chinese chemist

Hu Zhuangyou (Chinese: 胡壮猷; pinyin: Hú Zhuàngyóu), was a Chinese chemist, educator and former President of Zhejiang University.

== Biography ==
Hu's birth and death years are missing. Hu was born in Wuxi, Jiangsu Province. Hu's courtesy name was Yuruo (愚若).

Hu entered Nanyang Public School (南洋公学; main root of current Shanghai Jiao Tong University) in Shanghai and spent seven years studying there. After graduation, Hu continued to study chemistry in the United States.

From 1913 to 1914, Hu was the president of Zhejiang Advanced College (current Zhejiang University) in Hangzhou. From 1932 to 1936, Hu was a professor of chemistry in the Department of Chemistry of Peking University in Beijing. Hu retired in 1947.
