= Chinese Cultural Renaissance =

1960s cultural movement in Taiwan

The Chinese Cultural Renaissance or the Chinese Cultural Renaissance Movement (Chinese: 中華文化復興運動; pinyin: Zhōnghuá wénhuà fùxīng yūndòng; Wade–Giles: chung¹-hua² wên²-hua⁴ fu⁴-hsing¹ yün⁴-tung⁴) was a movement promoted in Taiwan by the Republic of China in opposition to the cultural destruction perpetrated by the Chinese Communist Party during the Cultural Revolution. The Chinese Cultural Renaissance was an ideological and cultural movement launched by the Government of the Republic of China with the aim of reviving Chinese culture, in order to maintain traditional Chinese culture and carry forward the revolutionary spirit of the Three Principles of the People and to contend with the Cultural Revolution movement of the Chinese Communist Party, in order to show that the true Republic of China is the representative of orthodox Chinese culture. In November 1966, 1,500 people—including Sun Fo, Wang Yun-wu, Chen Lifu, Chen Chi-tien, Kung Te-cheng, and Chang Chih-pen—wrote a letter to the Executive Yuan: the "Chinese Cultural Renaissance Movement" was proposed and the "Chinese Cultural Renaissance Festival" was designated as occurring on November 12 each year. On July 28, 1967, people from all walks of life in Taiwan held the initiation meeting of the Chinese Cultural Renaissance Movement Implementation Committee (now known as the Chinese Cultural Federation), with the President of the Republic of China, Chiang Kai-shek, as the president; the movement was implemented in Taiwan and overseas.

== Origin ==
Because mainland China was in the midst of the Cultural Revolution at that time, under the slogan of "shattering the old and building the new", a significant amount of Chinese cultural heritage was greatly damaged, and mainland Chinese cultural and intellectual circles were destroyed. The Government of the Republic of China then raised the banner of reviving Chinese culture, in an attempt to establish itself as the successor and defender of Chinese culture.

== Aims and objectives of the movement ==
- Taking ethics and morality as the foundation of a virtuous society. The most specific behavioral representations are loyalty, filial piety, Ren, love, letters, Yi, and peace; its most important philosophical foundation is contained in the word Ren.
- Taking democracy and liberty as the underlying principles that benefit the country, there is a great law that the whole country adheres to, namely the Constitution of the Republic of China. Keep political initiatives on track. The Legislative Yuan should be able to exercise its powers freely, so that the effectiveness of the law can be eternal, establishing the rule of law under the rule of the people.
- The ultimate goal of using science and technology as a moral principle for the benefit of the people. Raising the people up involves the six aspects of clothing, food, Domicile (law), transportation, education, and happiness. Therefore, the scientific construction of these six aspects is specially designed as the foundation of zhengde, utilization, and good health.

=== Laying the foundation for cultural revival from educational reform ===
To promote the general improvement through education and increasing national employment opportunities.

In terms of education, it calls for attaching equal importance to moral, intellectual, physical, and social education; attaching importance to life education and revising textbooks on life education for primary and middle school students; and focusing on ethics in students' daily life. At the same time, increase the scientific and technological education of students, in addition to cultivating vocational skills in national middle schools and high schools. Develop vocational schools, so as to meet the needs of construction and production work. The Chinese Cultural Renaissance Association established the Scientific and Technological Research and Invention Award to support scientific and technological inventions made by ordinary people.

In terms of sports, the committee focused on the advocacy and implementation of sports for all, the cooperation and application of teams, the improvement of sports facilities in schools and society, the strengthening of training and activities of sports organizations and teams, and the frequent organization of international sports activities and contacts, as well as encouraging sports academic research.

=== From academic consolidation to cultural renewal ===
Chiang Kai-shek stated that "harmony between mind, matter, group and oneself, resulting in the New China's Three Principles of ethics, democracy, scientific social blueprint, is to lead to cultural integration."

In the whole Chinese cultural Renaissance movement, the committee's goal was "to sort out the traditional culture and save the weeds. At the same time, the essence of Western culture is selected, absorbed and adopted, and the Chinese and Western cultures are integrated, so as to create a new neutral culture that can benefit mankind. Under the supervision of Chiang, the committee established a number of specialized organizations and committees, such as the Committee for the Promotion of Academic Publication, which was responsible for editing and publishing ancient Chinese books and popularizing academic study for the younger generation. For example, Zhouyijin, Laozi, Classic of Poetry, Mencius, Shiji, and Zizhi Tongjian were given new vernacular translations. In addition, a large number of ancient books were edited to make the text plain and easy to understand, so that ordinary people could understand them. A large number of ancient Chinese classics were photocopied and published, contributing to the preservation of the achievements of Chinese civilization.

To compile an overview of Chinese culture, a goal was to publish the works of 100 Chinese thinkers of all dynasties, comment on their lives, thoughts, activities, and their influence, so as to enable the Chinese people to have a deeper understanding of the evolution of Chinese academic thought. The movement compiled and printed stories of loyal and filial figures in the past dynasties of China (100) and selected writings of loyal and filial piety to carry forward the style of national cultural humanistic spirit. To re-translate the Four Books from English and distribute them overseas to enhance international scholars' understanding and appreciation of Chinese culture.

To translate and publish western classics, about politics, economics, society, science, and other fields, such as Science and Civilisation in China by the English historian Joseph Needham.

The Chinese Science and Technology Series, the Bibliography of Zhou-Qin, Han and Wei Scholars, the Selected Essays on Chinese History, the History of Chinese Humanities and Social Sciences Series, The Legal System in Modern China, the Western Translation Bibliography of Chinese Literature, the Album of Modernization and Chinese Cultural Renaissance, the General Bibliography of Chinese Culture, the Collection of Essays on Chinese Cultural Renaissance, and the Research and Development of the standard Template book, and other books have been published.

Introduce new science and technology and absorb new scientific knowledge to strengthen the modernization of the country. Academic collaboration is necessary to promote Chinese culture and a necessary method to integrate Chinese and Western cultures.

=== From the study of literature and art to the development of a cultural renaissance emperor ===
Encourage literature and art: one goal is to promote the specific behavior of ethics and morality, in order to show the national spirit of loyalty, filial piety, and kindness. Another goal is to advocate the democratic consciousness of anti-communism, anti-slavery, and anti-persecution in order to stabilize the democratic thought and system. A third goal is to develop science and technology and promote scientific and technological progress in order to realize national modernization and modern civilization. The specific plan is as follows:

- Establish a National Foundation for literature and Art.
- Formulate cultural policies.
- The Committee for the Promotion of Chinese Opera was responsible for the improvement and promotion of Chinese opera, such as giving regular performances, creating and arranging librettos, training of scenery personnel, designing courses on Chinese opera and improving textbooks, and the holding of summer Chinese opera workshops for junior colleges and universities.
- Establishment cultural centers at the central and the local level; in conjunction with literary and art circles throughout the country, they hold symposiums on literature and art, reward literary and art creation, set up literary and art research classes, and guide various literary and art activities, such as painting and calligraphy exhibitions, drama performances, dance performances, music performances, literary and artistic creation competitions, to continue and improve the traditional arts.
- Organize international cultural and artistic exchanges and study international literary and artistic creation skills.
- Compile and print the history of Chinese literature and art to correct part of the destruction of traditional Chinese literature and art.
- Produce a large number of cultural and artistic programs using mass communication, to promote literature and art.
- Print fine-art albums of famous contemporary Chinese painting and calligraphy.

=== From national life-coaching to cultural renewal ===
The committee set forth the proposition that culture is the representation of life, and that the cultivation of ethics and the development of morality should start with the guidance of people's lives, so that the people understand the principle of living, acting, and treating others. The true meaning of ethics should be embodied in the daily life of the people. An establishment of relevant norms is so that the interaction between people will have a certain standard scale and appropriate basis.

The committee also promulgated and implemented the Guidelines for National Life, which set out 99 specific rules covering such areas as clothing, food, housing, travel, and entertainment as guidelines for national life. The National Life Counseling Committee was responsible for promoting ethics and morals, initiating the "Youth Practice Campaign to Revitalize Chinese Culture" and formulating the "Instructions for National Life", which sets out basic requirements for People's Daily life, with a view to promoting the civilization of a country of rites and ceremonies. The Model of National Etiquette was revised and formally issued in 1970, expanding the cultivation of young people as the ideal of social life.

=== To achieve the goal of cultural innovation by integrating Chinese and Western cultures ===
To carry forward the cultural tradition of the Chinese nation and promote the continuous innovation and development of Chinese culture. The committee formulated the "Implementation Plan for the Integration and Development of Chinese Culture and Modern Western Academic Thought" and the "Implementation Plan for the Compilation and Publication of Chinese Culture Series" to affirm the value of Chinese culture.

== Movement process ==
Chiang Kai-shek, the then President of the Republic of China launched the movement in November 1966—on the 100th anniversary of Sun Yat-sen's birthday—by publicly announcing the official start of the renaissance movement. It was the Kuomintang's first structured plan for cultural development on Taiwan. Chiang himself was the head of the movement promotion council. Future president Lee Teng-hui was also involved in the movement and served as the president for the cultural renaissance.

Chiang announced ten goals:

1. To improve educational standards and promote family education with an emphasis on the Confucian principles of filial duty and fraternal love.
2. To reissue Chinese classic literary works and translate important works with a view toward disseminating Chinese culture abroad.
3. To encourage the creation of new literary and art works that are relevant to contemporary society and informed by the ideals of the cultural renaissance.
4. To launch the government planning and construction of new theaters, opera houses, auditoriums, and art galleries, as well as stadiums throughout the country, and to improve existing facilities.
5. To utilize all mass media for the promotion of the cultural renaissance with an emphasis upon encouraging good customs and morals.
6. To guide the modernization of national life under the influence of the Confucian Principles of the "Four Social Controls" (propriety, rectitude, honesty, and a sense of shame) and the "Eight Virtues" (Loyalty, filial piety, benevolence, love, faithfulness, justice, harmony, and peace), a goal to be achieved with the help of the newly launched New Life Movement.
7. To promote tourism and the preservation of historical relics.
8. To increase support for overseas Chinese education, including the publication of newspapers and the promotion of cultural activities abroad.
9. To maintain close ties with foreign institutions and intellectuals, particularly those whose research focuses on China.
10. To revise tax statutes and regulations in order to encourage wealthy individuals, private industries, and private businesses to make donations to government-endorsed cultural and educational establishments.

On November 12, 1966, the centenary of Sun Yat-sen's birth, at the inauguration ceremony of the newly built Chung-Shan Building Chinese Culture Hall on Yangmingshan in Taipei, Chiang Kai-shek published the Commemorative Paper of the inauguration of the Chung-Shan Building Chinese Culture Hall, which continued to promote the cultural purpose of the integration of the Three People's Principles and Chinese tradition. It stated that "the thought of the Three People's Principles is not only the convergence of Chinese culture, but the national revolution of the Three People's Principles is the defender of Chinese national culture". It says, "I firmly believe that ethics, democracy and science are the essence of the Three Principles of the People, which is also the cornerstone of the traditional culture of the Chinese nation." At that time, all the participants in the memorial meeting, then jointly signed a petition to the government to designate November 12 as the anniversary of the father's birthday, as well as the Chinese Culture Renaissance Festival.

On December 25, 1966, Chiang Kai-shek presided over the meeting of the "National Assembly Constitutional Studies". At the meeting, the launch of a campaign was announced, that would to revive Chinese culture, implement the Three Principles of the People, and awaken rational conscience by virtue of traditional humanistic spirit and ethical concepts. On December 26, the Fourth Plenary session of the Kuomintang was held in Taipei, Taiwan Province. The meeting adopted a plan for the Chinese Cultural Revival Movement.

On February 14, 1967, Premier Yen Chia-kan proposed to the Legislative Yuan the policy of promoting the Cultural Revival Movement. On April 9, Chiang Kai-shek sent a letter to the annual meeting of the Confucius and Mencius Society, saying that carrying forward Confucius and Mencius theory would help implement the Three Principles of the People, reform people's lives, and realize a cultural renaissance. On July 28, a conference was held at Chung-Shan Building, Yangmingshan. The meeting adopted the program and constitution of the "Chinese Cultural Renaissance Movement" and elected officers of the organization. The Executive Yuan of the Republic of China established the "China Renewal Movement Committee", with Chiang Kai-shek as the chairman, and Sun Fo, Wang Yun-wu, Ch'ien Mu, Cardinal Paul Yu Pin, Zuo Shunsheng, Lin Yutang, Wang Shixian, Chien Shih-Liang, and Hsieh Tung-min as the presidium.

On July 30, 1967, the Central Committee of the Kuomintang promulgated the Measures for Promoting the Chinese Cultural Revival Movement, proposing to strengthen academic research, promote social life, organize literary and artistic activities, cooperate in education, advocate mass communication, and strengthen women's work. Measures were also promulgated to strengthen the education of the Three People's Principles, strengthen the will to fight, and carry forward traditional culture.

On August 24, 1967, Sun Fo, Wang Yun-wu, and Chen Lifu became vice chairmen of the Committee for Promoting the Rejuvenation of Chinese Culture. Gu Fengxiang was appointed Secretary-General.

On August 28, 1967, the Ministry of Education of the Republic of China issued a ten-point directive to promote nine-year national education:

- Promote the cultural renaissance movement.
- Make long-term plans for national schools.
- Arrange school teaching hours according to the regulations of the Ministry of Education.
- Forbid schools from buying or selling unapproved tutoring materials.
- Have teachers devote themselves to education, and not give paid tutoring.
- Set standards for students' homework: junior students homework no more than half an hour, senior students no more than one hour.
- Strengthen art education and cultivate practical working ability.
- Consult with teachers regarding subjects to be taught.
- Establish teaching seminars in schools.
- Combine national education with family education.

On November 21, 1967, the Fifth Plenary session of the Ninth CCP Central Committee of the Chinese Kuomintang adopted a resolution: to carry forward the traditional Chinese culture, respect personality independence, respect democracy and freedom, implement land for the tiller, promote social welfare, safeguard the freedom of choosing a career, maintain family ethical relations, freedom of religious belief, equality of all nationalities, and maintain international peace.

On March 29, 1968, Chiang Kai-shek issued a "Message to the Youth" on Youth Day, proposing to "serve the country with science and develop the essence of national culture. Ethics, democracy and science are linked together. If democracy does not flourish, science and ethics will not flourish. In national construction, the development of science is the first priority. We should be proud of being a Chinese, responsible for the nation and the human race."

April 30, 1968, the Committee for the Promotion of the Chinese Revival Movement issued the "Instructions for National Life". On October 15, the Committee for the Promotion of the China Renaissance Movement set several priorities for its work: promoting guidelines for people's life, strengthening physical education, formulating etiquette for people's lives, carrying out education reform, setting up standard centers for literary and artistic activities, establishing large-scale national social education centers, sorting out Chinese operas and music, translating and interpreting ancient books as national readings, and translating and introducing world classics.

On November 12, 1968, Chiang Kai-shek issued a Message to the Compatriots of the whole Country on Sun Yat-sen's birthday and the Festival of the Revival of Chinese Culture, proposing to "revive Chinese culture, create a new era of the Three Principles of the People, carry forward the spirit of ethics, science and democracy, clarify ethics and righteousness, and know shame; To carry out the constitutionalism of the Three Principles of the People, we should start from promoting the politics of integrity and energy. Together we can save our country, compatriots and culture."

On April 8, 1969, the tenth plenary session of the Kuomintang passed the "Program of Social Construction at the present stage" express "social construction objectives: carry forward scientific function, cultivate enterprise spirit. Use human resources to strengthen social welfare measures, establish social security, seek social development, balance social construction, balance wealth, and build a peaceful, happy and prosperous society. Foster law-abiding and orderly spirit among the people, promote local autonomy, and develop the national spirit. Inherit excellent cultural traditions, clear rites and righteousness, emphasize honesty and know shame".

On December 25, 1969, Chiang Kai-shek wrote to the National Assembly of the Republic of China on the anniversary of the ratification of the Constitution of the Republic of China: "Strive to promote democratic constitutionalism, expounding the concept of combining science and ethics, cultivating moral and spiritual strength, and promoting the sound development of mankind. Master the spirit of benevolence of Chinese culture, eliminate the poison of materialism in the world".

On July 29, 1970, the Ministry of Education of the Republic of China issued the "Patriotic and Founding of the country Education Program", which proposed to strengthen teacher education, carry forward national cultural traditions, promote national self-esteem, encourage teachers to further study, develop vocational and technical education, improve junior college education, encourage scholars to return to Taiwan to teach.

On July 26, 1971, Chiang Kai-shek, to further promote the development of the movement, put forward at the fourth meeting of the Committee for the implementation of the Chinese Cultural Renaissance Movement: "Keeping to the classics and abiding by them, innovating and adapting to new conditions, reviewing the past and learning the new, if one wishes to make new changes day by day, difficulties will revitalize the country, and sorrow will revitalize the saints."

"From the overall perspective, from the practical focus, develop team spirit, establish a love for the people, convenient atmosphere; All governance to carry forward the national interests, to develop the national spirit, under the banner of the Three Principles of the People of unity at home and abroad", was the proposal Chiang Ching-kuo made in a June 13, 1972, policy address at the Legislative Yuan.

The Republic of China's Society of Confucius and Mencius convened on April 22, 1973. Chiang Kai-shek made the suggestion that "Chinese people should be clear in etiquette and law-abiding, practice benevolence and justice, and take Confucius and Mencius as the source of the Three Principles of the People".

On December 17, Chiang Kai-shek told his compatriots to expand the movement of good people and good deeds, saying that the development of humanity is the best weapon, and the Republic of China is engaged in spiritual, cultural and ideological warfare with humanism to attack people's hearts and spirits.

On March 28, 1975, Chiang Ching-kuo published an article encouraging "Dedicating oneself to the country and dedicating one's heart to the people" to commemorate the Youth Day; to carry forward national morality, culture, tradition and intelligence, the destiny of China should be controlled by the young people.

On September 16, 1976, Chiang Ching-kuo delivered a policy address at the Legislative Yuan, stressing that "the way of education lies in consolidating the foundation of the country, the foundation of administration lies in serving the people, and working together to create a pure and simple society".

In the late 1970s, in response to the Chinese cultural renaissance movement, the Yan Clan Association in Taiwan began to build the Yan Zi Temple in Songshan District, Taipei City. The Zheng clan Association established the Kaitai Shengwang Chenggong Temple in Neihu District; the Meng Clan Association also planned to build a Mencius Temple near the Golden Dragon Temple in the Neihu District.

== Evaluation ==
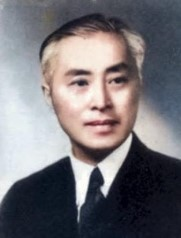
Chen Lifu

- Chen Lifu: It has been 13 years since the Chinese Cultural Renaissance Movement was launched. What are the achievements? Society has its fair judgment. But here it is necessary to say:
  - First, the cultural revival has been guided along the correct lines. Ethics, democracy, and science are the cornerstone of Chinese culture and the essence of the Three Principles of the People. To revive Chinese culture, we must practice the Three Principles of the People.
  - Second, the cultural renaissance has promoted the flourishing of culture. In the past, foreigners called Taiwan a cultural desert. Now, Taiwan has a variety of cultural activities: books and periodical printing, lectures, symposiums, viewing parties, exhibitions, etc., held almost every day, visible at any time.
  - Third, cultural revival has elevated our country's cultural reputation and status. Internationally, Taiwan is regarded as the richest place to preserve the fine traditional culture of China, which has increased the admiration and reverence of international scholars for Taiwan, and even their love for Taiwan, which has increased the number of tourists to Taiwan.
- Mou Tsung-san: "National cultural and spiritual education", like other aspects of education, is "material" and "teaching". There is no "spirit" at all. Naturally, it cannot be called "education".

== See also ==
- History of the Kuomintang cultural policy
- May Fourth Movement
- Zoulu (culture)
- Chiangism
- Revitalize China → The Chinese dream of the great rejuvenation of the Chinese nation
- Culture of the Republic of China

=== The opposite cultural movement in China ===
- Before 1949: New Culture Movement, complete Westernization
- After 1949:
- Mainland China: Cultural Revolution, Breaking the Four Olds, Criticize Lin, Criticize Confucius
- Taiwan: De-Sinicization, Taiwan Localization Movement
