= History of the Kuomintang cultural policy =

The history of the Kuomintang cultural policy began with a policies of intense cultural suppression during the early postwar period (1945–1960) in Taiwan. The Kuomintang (KMT, Chinese Nationalist Party) suppressed localism and barred Taiwanese from cosmopolitan life except in the spheres of science and technology. The authoritarian KMT dominated public cultural space and Chinese nationalist networks became a part of cultural institutions, leaving little resource for cultural autonomy to grow.

== Early postwar period (1945–1960) ==
Under the early KMT, Taiwan was realigned from a Japanese imperial center to a Chinese nationalist center, under the influence of KMT and American geo-political interests. Although American cultural activities were modest, they played a significant role in Taiwan's developing cultural scene. The KMT claimed a loss of morale led to "losing the Mainland" and thus the state issued a series of ideological reforms aimed to "retake the mainland", which became the major state cultural program or the time, The immediate preoccupation with losing China diverted long-term investment in the humanities and social sciences. On another level, the state's main objective was to "sinicize" the Taiwanese by teaching them Mandarin Chinese and Nationalist ideology through compulsory primary education.

By the late 1940s the KMT had eliminated dissent for its cultural policies. When Taiwanese had resumed the cultural activities, which were outlawed by the Japanese in 1937, the Nationalist attitude was that Taiwanese had been Japanese "slaves" and would therefore have to complete a period of moral and ideological tutelage before they could enjoy their full rights as citizens of the Republic of China. The February 28 Incident destroyed Taiwan's urban elite and the arrival of the mainlander elite ensured Nationalist domination of urban cultural centers.

In 1953, Generalissimo Chiang Kai-shek issued his first major opinion on culture to complete Sun Yat-sen's Three Principles of the People, which included prescribing Nationalist curriculum for education, building facilities for intellectual and physical recreation and the major state cultural program of promoting anti-communist propaganda.In regard to Taiwanese cultural life, the major thrust was for "universalization" of education in Mandarin. Despite the hard-line nationalist control over culture, the Soviet advances in technology led to a new Nationalist focus on building closer cooperation with American universities and developing engineering programs. The American presence in Taiwan also encouraged Taiwanese to resume some politically benign cultural activities, which was expressed in a flourishing Taiwanese language media market.

== Later policies (1960–1990) ==
Between the beginning of the 1960s and mid-1970s Taiwanese cultural life was in a period of gradual transition between the immediate postwar ideological goal of "retaking the mainland" and the social realities of Taiwan's development. The social sciences and the humanities struggled to gain acceptance as preferable forms of cosmopolitanism, while new cultural markets implored the state the promote positive cultural programs with an eye on increased space for localism. Despite the United States' gradual lowering of its political commitment to Taiwan, academic and technological exchange flourished. The restrictive atmosphere in Taiwan resulted in a brain drain as many students failed to return after receiving their American degrees. This also created networks of information exchange back to Taiwan. The result was an increase in "westernized" modernism followed by a Nationalist instigated traditionalist backlash. The effect of this backlash on many older "Mainlanders" sparked the Chinese cultural renaissance movement, which sought to exemplify the selected cultural traits of China in contrast to the "west" and moreover, answer the communist Cultural Revolution.

Taiwan's deteriorating international position led to an increase in state fuelled nationalism, which was vented against Japan in a dispute over the Diaoyutai islets. Despite the nationalist posturing, the tremors of cultural liberalization were beginning to shake Taiwan's foundations as intellectuals, artists and professionals began filtering back to Taiwan. Taiwan's decreasing prominence in the battle to win the Cold War also forced the KMT to refrain from the hard-line tactics it had used to extinguish dissent, and as a result, the government's ability to limit liberal intellectuals from the cultural sphere was severely inhibited.

By the latter half of Chiang Ching-kuo's rule, the state shifted to a more positive role in facilitating cultural life. Taiwan's economic development pushed Taiwan into the global market and American-Taiwanese cooperation shifted from a political to an economic partnership. The KMT started moving from an ideological and coercive cultural policy of terror and assassination to the more mundane works of the Chiang Ching-kuo Foundation, a foundation dedicated to providing monetary support for academic and cultural research.

Despite originally trying to limit cosmopolitanism, by the late 1980s the KMT promoted it in an effort to diffuse the growing "localization" movement. The availability of international culture provided open space for cultural discourse and criticism. In another surprising move to combat localism, the KMT reversed decades of policy against "contact with the "mainland" and allowed Taiwanese tourists to visit with the goal to confirm the KMT maxims, "Taiwanese are ethnically Chinese" and "Communism is bad." Nevertheless, localism in Taiwan became an accepted discourse on Taiwan. Press censorship continued through much of the 70's and 80's as banned books and bookstores were shut down by Garrison Command. The strict nationalized cultural policies of the KMT became the target of the "tangwai" political opposition, which favored and often equally rigid cultural policy to counter the KMT. The political opposition promoted an, often ethnocentric, cultural policy, which sought to mobilize ethnic Taiwanese against the KMT's ruling ethnic minority and sought to revive and accentuate their own version of Taiwanese culture.
