= Chu Coching =

Chinese geologist and meteorologist (1890–1974)

Coching Chu
- 竺可楨
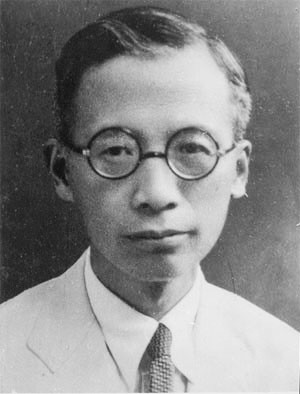
- Born: March 7, 1890; Shangyu, Shaoxing, Zhejiang, China
- Died: February 7, 1974 (aged 83); Beijing, China
- Education: Fudan University; University of Illinois at Urbana-Champaign (BS); Harvard University (PhD)
- Scientific career
- Fields: Meteorology; Geology
- Workplaces: National Southeast University; National Chekiang University; Academia Sinica; Chinese Academy of Sciences
- Thesis: A New Classification of Typhoons of the Far East (1924)

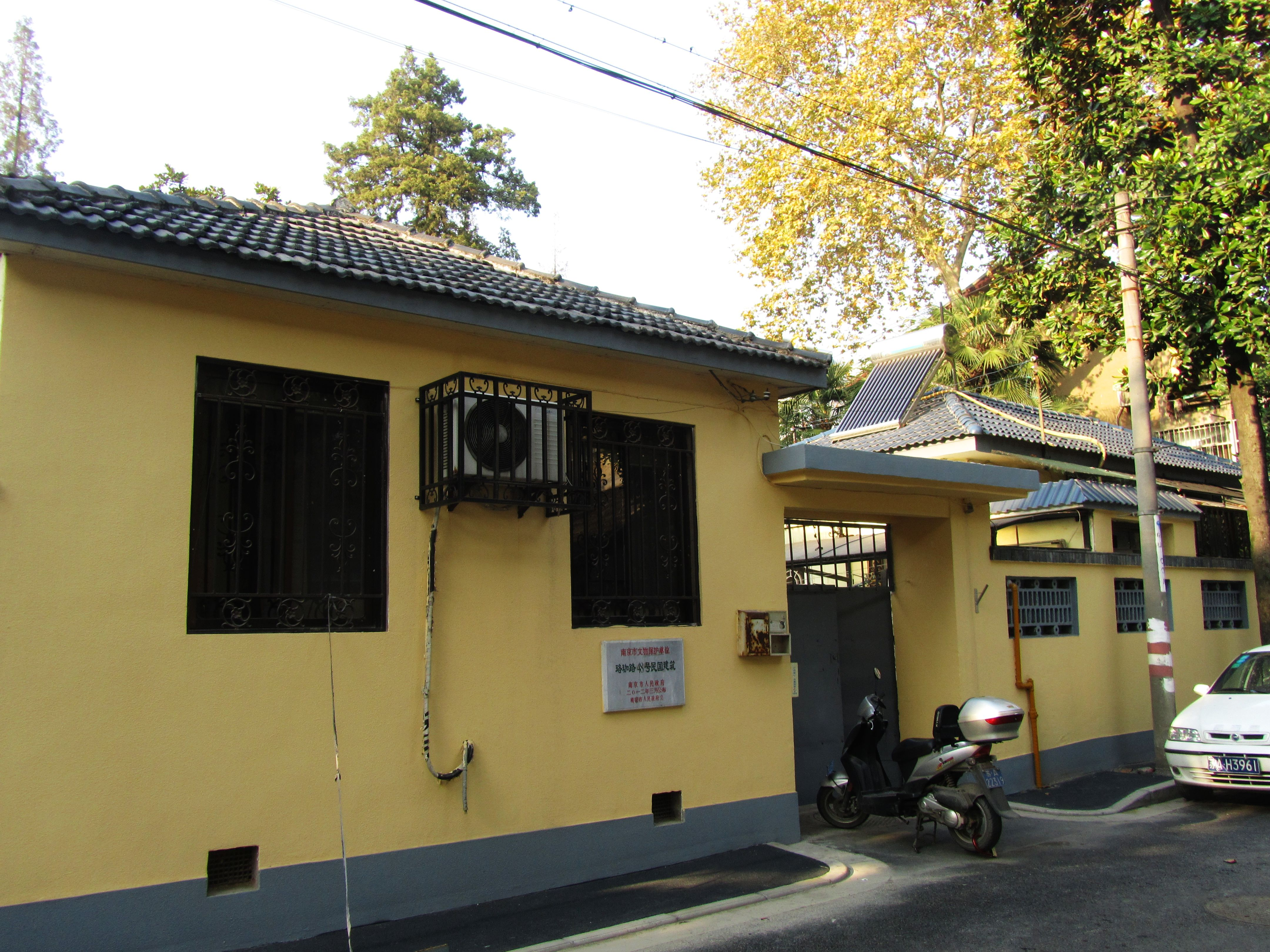
Former residence of Coching Chu in Nanjing.

Coching Chu (simplified Chinese: 竺可桢; traditional Chinese: 竺可楨; pinyin: Zhú Kězhēn; Wade–Giles: Chu K'o-chen; March 7, 1890 – February 7, 1974), also romanized as Zhu Kezhen, was a Chinese geologist and meteorologist. He is considered the founder of modern meteorology and geography in China.

== Life and career ==
Born in Shangyu, Shaoxing, Zhejiang, Chu received his secondary education at the Tangshan School of Rail and Mining in Shanghai. Upon receiving the Boxer Indemnity Scholarship, Chu went to United States for his college education in 1910. He graduated from the College of Agriculture, University of Illinois in 1913. He then studied under Robert DeCourcy Ward at Harvard University and received his Ph.D. in meteorology in 1918.

From 1920 to 1929, he was chairperson of Department of Meteorology, Nanjing University (formerly known as the Nanking Higher Normal School, National Southeastern University, and National Central University).

From 1929 to 1936 he served as director of the Chinese Institute of Meteorology of the Academia Sinica, which at the time was located in mainland China. Academia Sinica later became the predecessor of the Chinese Academy of Sciences of the People's Republic of China on mainland China and the Academia Sinica of the Republic of China on Taiwan.

From 1936 to 1949, he served as the president of National Chekiang University (now known as Zhejiang University) and elevated the institution to one of the most prestigious universities in China. During that time, he sent manuscripts relating to the history of Chinese science to Joseph Needham in England.

In 1949, he was assigned to the position of vice president of the Chinese Academy of Sciences.

In 1955, he was elected an academician of the Chinese Academy of Sciences.

== Academic papers ==
- Some Chinese Contributions to Meteorology Geographical Review: Vol. 5, No. 2. (Feb., 1918), pp. 136–139.
- A New Classification of Typhoons of the Far East Monthly Weather Review: Vol. 52, No. 12. (Dec., 1924), pp. 570–579.
- The Place of Origin and Recurvature of Typhoons Monthly Weather Review: Vol. 53, No. 1 (Jan., 1925), pp. 1–5.
- The Complete Works of Coching Chu Shanghai Scientific & Technological Education Publishing House

Academic offices
Preceded by Zheng Xiaocang	President of Zhejiang University; 1936 – 1949	Succeeded by Ma Yinchu
