= Lu Yongxiang (politician) =

Chinese mechanical engineer and politician

Lu Yongxiang 路甬祥
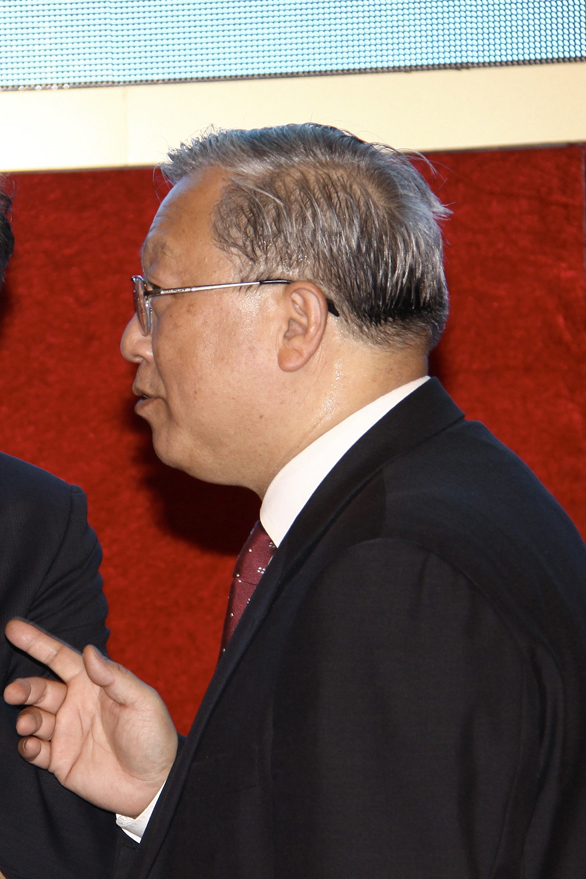
- Born: April 28, 1942 (age 84); Cixi, Zhejiang, China
- Education: Zhejiang University; RWTH Aachen University
- Awards: Rudolf-Diesel-Medaille (1997); Bundesverdienstkreuz (2000); Harnack medal (2006)
- Scientific career
- Fields: Mechanical engineering
- Workplaces: Zhejiang University; RWTH Aachen University; CAS; Tsinghua University

Lu Yongxiang (Chinese: 路甬祥; pinyin: Lù Yǒngxiáng; born April 28, 1942) is a Chinese mechanical engineer and politician. He served as President of the Chinese Academy of Sciences and Vice Chairman of the National People's Congress.

== Biography ==
Lu studied in the Department of Mechanical Engineering, Zhejiang University (ZJU), and majored in hydrodynamics (hydraulic mechanics). He graduated from ZJU in 1964, and became a lecturer in his department at ZJU. 1979, Lu was an Alexander von Humboldt Research Fellow at RWTH Aachen University, West Germany. Lu obtained his doctorate in 1981, based on his dissertation Entwicklung vorgesteuerter Proportionalventile mit 2-Wege-Einbauventil als Stellglied und mit geräteinterner Rückführung. Aachen: Techn. Hochsch.; Diss.; 1981.

In 1981, Lu returned to ZJU and continued his teaching position as a lecturer. He soon was promoted to associate professor and was the research group leader of the Laboratory of Fluid Power Transmission and Control at ZJU. 1983, Lu was promoted to professor, and was the director of the Institute of Fluid Power Transmission and Control, Department of Mechanical Engineering, ZJU. From 1985 to 1987, Lu served as Vice-president of ZJU; and from 1988 to 1995, he was the President of ZJU. Lu is also a part-time professor at Tsinghua University.

Lu was appointed Vice-president of the Chinese Academy of Sciences (CAS) in November 1993. From 1993 to 1997, he was the Executive Vice-president of CAS. From July 1997 to March 2011, he was the President of the Chinese Academy of Sciences, and also the Executive Chairman of the Presidential Committee of CAS Academic Board (中国科学院学部主席团). Lu has served as a Vice-chairman of National People's Congress.

== Academic & educational positions ==
Presidentships:

- Vice-president, the Chinese Academy of Sciences (CAS), (1993–1997)
- Executive Vice-president, CAS, (1994–1997)
- Executive Chairman, the Presidential Committee of CAS Academic Board, (1997–2011)
- President, CAS, (1997–2011)
- Vice-president, Chinese Association of Science and Technology (中国科学技术协会), (1986–1996)
- Chairman, Higher Education Consultative Committee of the State Education Commission, (1990–1994)
- Director-general (理事长), Chinese Society for the History of Science and Technology (中国科学技术史学会), (1995–2004)
- Director-general, Chinese Mechanical Engineering Society (中国机械工程学会), (2001–present)
- Vice-president, Third World Academy of Sciences (TWAS), (1998–2006)
- Co-Chair, InterAcademy Council (IAC), (2005–present)

Memberships:

- Academician, the Chinese Academy of Engineering (CAE), (June 1994 election)
- Academician, the Chinese Academy of Sciences (CAS), in the Division of Technological Sciences, (1991 election)
- Member, University Grants Committee (Hong Kong), (1996–2003)
- Member, Third World Academy of Sciences (TWAS), (1990-)
- Foreign Member, Hungarian Academy of Sciences, (2004-)
- Honorary Fellow, the Institute of Mechanical Engineering, UK, (2004-)
- Corresponding Member, the Australian Academy of Science, (2004-)
- Foreign Member, German Academy of Sciences Leopoldina, (2005-)
- Foreign Member, Russian Academy of Sciences, (2006-)

== Social & political positions ==
- Vice-chairman, National People's Congress of the People's Republic of China, (2003–present)
- Member, Chief Executive's Commission on Innovation and Technology, Hong Kong SAR, (1998–1999)
- Special Advisor, Advisory Commission on Innovation and Technology, Hong Kong SAR, (2000–present)

== Honors & awards ==
- Rudolf-Diesel-Medaille (1997)
- Alexander von Humboldt Medal (1998)
- The Knight Commander's Cross (Badge & Star) of the Order of Merit of the Federal Republic of Germany, (2000)
- Werner Heisenberg Medal (2001), from the Alexander von Humboldt Foundation
- Gold Badge for Science and Culture of Public President of Italy, (2004)
- Abdus Salam Medal, from the Third World Academy of Sciences (TWAS), (2006)
- Harnack medal (2006), from the Max Planck Institute
- The Jawaharlal Nehru Birth Centenary Medal (2010), from the INSA
- The Robert. E. Koski Medal (2010), from ASME, for a lifetime outstanding contributions in the field of fluid power transmission and control

Academic offices
Preceded by Han Zhenxiang	President of Zhejiang University; 1988–1995	Succeeded by Pan Yunhe
Preceded by Zhou Guangzhao	President of Chinese Academy of Sciences; 1997–2011	Succeeded by Bai Chunli
