= Hangzhou High School =

Coordinates: 30°16′03″N 120°10′05″E

Location
- No.238, Fengqi Road, Xiacheng District(Gongyuan Campus); No.1958, East Zhijiang Road, Jianggan District(Qianjiang Campus); Hangzhou, Zhejiang; China

Information
- Type: Public
- Motto: Science, Democracy, Truth, Creativity (科学、民主、求真、创新)
- Established: 1899 清光绪二十五年(the twenty-fifth year of Emperor Guangxu of Qing Dynasty)
- Headmaster: Tang Xinhong 唐新红
- Enrollment: 1728
- Average class size: about 50
- Campus: Urban

Hangzhou High School (Chinese: 浙江省杭州高级中学), or Hanggao, established in 1899, is one of the most famous high schools in Southern China. It was the earliest-founded public high school in Zhejiang Province. Its history dates back to Yangzheng College founded by Lin Qi. There are 52 academicians who graduated from the institution as of 2018.

Hangzhou High School has two campuses, the Gongyuan Campus at No.238, Fengqi Road, and the Qianjiang Campus at No.1958 East Zhijiang Road. The Qianjiang Campus started operating in September 2015. This new campus including the International Division, which provide AP Courses to students.

Hangzhou High School also participates in several international exchange programs with high schools oversea. There is Dover-Sherborn Exchange with Dover-Sherborn High School in Boston, MA.

== Club activities ==
=== Hanggao Observatory ===
Hanggao Observatory, also known as "Hangzhou High School Astronomy Club", is the student astronomy club. 48700 Hanggao (provisional designation: 1996 HZ21) is a main-belt minor planet. It was discovered through the Beijing Schmidt CCD Asteroid Program at the Xinglong Station in the Yan Mountains of China on April 17, 1996. It is named after Hangzhou High School.

=== Hanggao Model United Nations ===
Hanggao Model United Nations is a non-profit academic organization established in 2011 by students in Hangzhou High School.

So far, Hanggao Model United Nations has held four sessions of the Model United Nations Conference in 2015, 2016, 2017 and 2018. Among them, the 2018 Hangzhou High School Model United Nations Conference has more than 150 representatives from 16 high schools and 3 universities——Haining High School, Jinhua No. 1 Middle School, Jiashan High School, Jinyun Middle School, Shaoxing No. 1 Middle School, Ningbo No. 3 Middle School; Outside Zhejiang province includes Jiangsu Qianhuang Senior High School, Shanghai Maple Leaf International School, China Metrology University, etc.

The development of Hanggao Model United Nations Conference has moved from the initial school-level conference to the municipal level, and then to the regional conferences out of Hangzhou City, out of Zhejiang Province, and to the world. After the closing of each Hanggao Model United Nations Conference, it would be highly praised by every representative.

=== Hanggao Lu Xun Literature Club ===
On October 10, 1921, Wang Jingzhi, Pan Mohua, Feng Xuefeng and other students from Zhejiang First Normal School (predecessor of Hangzhou High School) founded the literature club "Chenguang Club" (the "Lakeside Poetry Club" was established the following year), and received the support of teachers such as Ye Shengtao, Zhu Ziqing, who taught them at that time. That meant the birth of the earliest new literary group in Zhejiang, and the creation of a new era of Hangzhou schools' century-old tradition.

Lu Xun Literature Club, also known as "Luwen", is based on the tradition of humanity and high standards of literature. The activities of the Literature Club are mainly organized by the students themselves, guided by the instructors.

== Notable alumni ==
=== Arts and literature ===
- Lu Xun 鲁迅, founding member of modern Chinese literature movement.
- Li Shutong 李叔同, Buddhist monk, artist and art teacher.
- Xu Zhimo 徐志摩, renowned poet.
- Yu Dafu 郁达夫, short story writer and poet.
- Li Linsi 厉麟似, renowned educator, diplomat and scholar.
- Feng Zikai 丰子恺, painter and cartoonist.
- Pan Tianshou 潘天寿, painter and art educator.
- Jin Wulun 金吾伦, philosopher and close friend of Jin Yong
- Qin Benli 钦本立, newspaper editor

=== Government and politics ===
- Xu Kuangdi 徐匡迪, Academician of the Chinese Academy of Engineering
- Hu Jingyao 胡景耀, Chief scientist of National Astronomical Observatories, Chinese Academy of Sciences, Honorary adviser of Hanggao Observatory

=== Academia ===
- Jiang Lifu 姜立夫, mathematician, The creator of Nankai University math college

== Principals ==
- 1942 - 1946: Cui Dongbo 崔东伯
- 1984 - 1999: Qi Dong 齐栋
- 1999 - 2005: Ge Jinfa 葛锦发
- 2005 - 2010: Miao Shuijuan 缪水娟
- 2010 - 2017: Shang Ke 尚可
- 2017 – 2021: Xiaoxiong Cai 蔡小雄
- 2021–present: Tang Xinhong 唐新红

== Sister schools ==
- Dover-Sherborn High School
- Hokuriku High School
