= Former site of Qiushi Academy =

The former site of Qiushi Academy
- 求是书院旧址
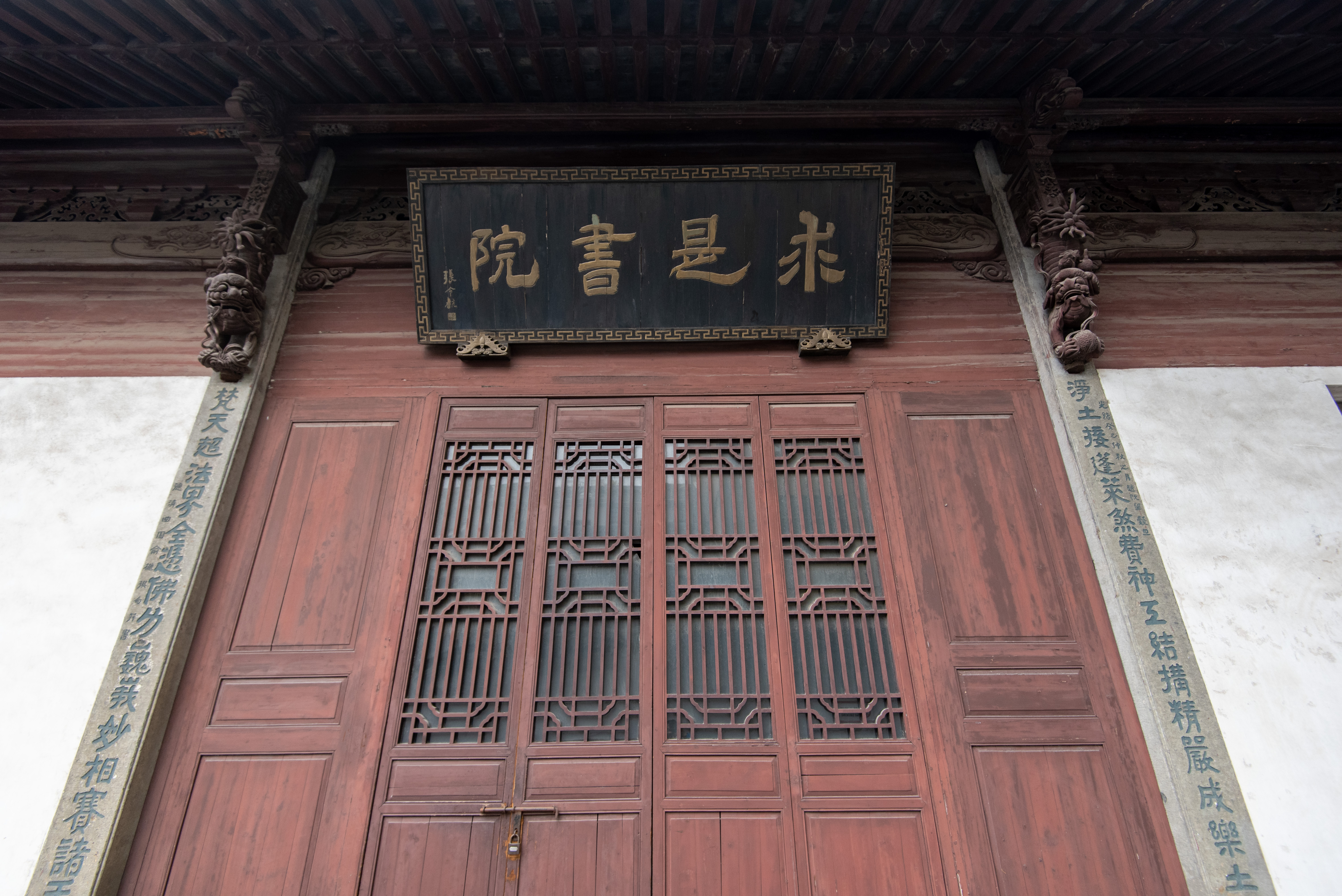
- Former names: Puci Temple

General information
- Status: Protected
- Address: 160 Daxue Road
- Town or city: Hangzhou
- Country: China
- Coordinates: 30.25941°N 120.17856°E
- Groundbreaking: 1889
- Completed: 1891
- Known for: Hosting the first university in Zhejiang from 1897 to 1956

The former site of Qiushi Academy (simplified Chinese: 求是书院旧址; traditional Chinese: 求是書院舊址; pinyin: Qiúshì Shūyuàn) is historic site protected as a Major Historical and Cultural Site Protected at the National Level. The site was made a college campus by Hangzhou mayor Lin Qi in 1897. It became the oldest campus of Zhejiang University and hosted the university until it moved to Yuquan campus in 1956.

== History ==
=== Puci Temple ===
Puci Temple (Chinese: 普慈寺; pinyin: Pǔcí Sì) was a Buddhist temple built by the monk Sijing (Chinese: 思净) in the Shaoxing era (1131–1162) of the Southern Song dynasty. It was repaired in the Zhizheng era (1341–1370) of the Yuan dynasty by the monk Yuanzhong (Chinese: 元忠), destroyed in the early Ming dynasty, and rebuilt by the monk Zhijue (Chinese: 智珏) in the Jiajing era (1522–1566) of the Ming dynasty. In 1889 and 1891, the temple was again rebuilt by the monk Shi Wenda (Chinese: 释闻达) as one of the largest temples in the eastern part of the city. However, the temple was destroyed in a disaster before it was fully completed. The temple was then handed over to the local government.

=== Zhejiang University ===
Six years after the disaster, the scholar-officials of Hangzhou, led by Lin Qi, the then-mayor of Hangzhou, re-utilised the site of the temple to establish Qiushi Academy and Military Academy. Qiushi Academy was renamed as Zhejiang Qiushi University in 1901, as Zhejiang University in 1902 and as Zhejiang Higher Institute in December 1903 and continued to operate until it was closed in 1914. It focused on the so-called "New Learnings" or "New Subjects" (新學 / 新学). It had a study duration of five years, and taught courses including Chinese, English, mathematics, history, geology/geography, physics, and chemistry. It also held several foreign lecturers.

In 1927, the site was returned to the alumni of Qiushi Academy and Zhejiang Higher Institute, where the government founded Zhejiang University by merging the Zhejiang Public Industrial School (Chinese: 浙江公立工业专门学校) in the neighbouring coinage (Chinese: 铜元局) and Zhejiang Public Agricultural School (Chinese: 浙江公立农业专门学校) in Jianqiao. Thereafter, the site became a major campus of Zhejiang University, which hosted its College of Humanities, College of Sciences, College of Engineering and College of Normal Education.

=== Chinese Medicine College ===
After the 1952 reorganisation of Chinese higher education, Zhejiang University was reduced to an engineering specialised university, but remained at the site. After Zhejiang University moved to its Yuquan campus in 1956, the site became seized by Zhejiang Vocational School of Traditional Chinese Medicine, which was later upgraded to Zhejiang Chinese Medicine College. During the time, the westernised buildings of Qiushi Academy was demolished and the current historic site was the main hall of the temple, the only remaining part of Puci Temple.

== Protection ==
In August 1997, the site became protected as a Major Historical and Cultural Site Protected at the Provincial Level. In 1999, the Chinese Medicine College moved out of the site. In 2005, the land was purchased by the Hangzhou municipal government from the Chinese Medicine College. In 2019, the site was listed as a Major Historical and Cultural Site Protected at the National Level.
