= Pan Tianshou =

Chinese painter and art educator

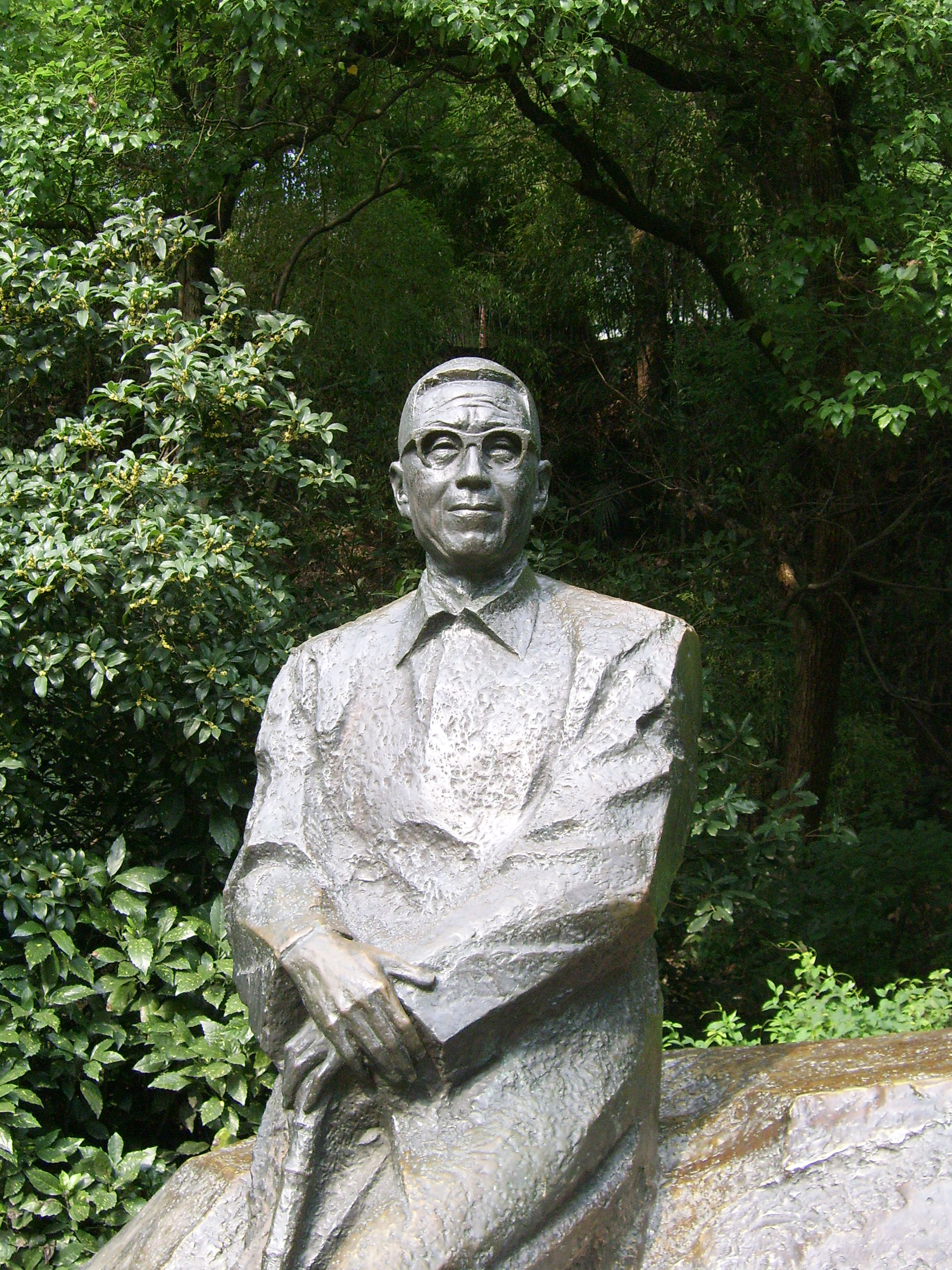
- Sculpture of Pan Tianshou at the lakeside of West Lake
- Born: March 14, 1897; Guanzhuang, Ninghai, Zhejiang, China
- Died: September 5, 1971 (aged 74); Hangzhou, Zhejiang, China

Pan Tianshou (simplified Chinese: 潘天寿; traditional Chinese: 潘天壽; pinyin: Pān Tiānshòu; March 14, 1897 – September 5, 1971) was a Chinese painter and art educator.

Pan was born in Guanzhuang, Ninghai County, Zhejiang Province, and graduated from Zhejiang First Normal School (now Hangzhou High School). He studied Chinese traditional painting with Wu Changshuo, and built the foundation of Chinese traditional painting education. He was persecuted during the Cultural Revolution until his death in 1971.

== Biography ==
=== Early life and education ===
On March 14, 1897 (lunar calendar February 12), he was born in Guanzhuang Village, Ninghai County, Zhejiang Province. His birth name was Pan Tianjin (天谨) and courtesy name Tianshou (天授).

In 1903, his mother died. In summer, he was enrolled in private school in the village. Beside taking classes, he liked calligraphy, and also enjoyed imitating illustrations on novels such as the Romance of the Three Kingdoms and the Water Margin.

In Spring 1910, he entered Zhengxue Primary School in town, and received western school education. After class, he was interested in calligraphy, painting and stamp carving. He brought "Jieziyuan Painting Album" (芥子园画谱) and several albums of models of calligraphy. Those were enlightening materials for him to self-study Chinese painting and calligraphy, and he thus was determined to devote his whole life to Chinese painting.

In Autumn 1915, he was enrolled into Zhejiang First Normal School in Hangzhou with excellent grades.

In 1918, he was on 4th grade at school, and drew "Loquats" (枇杷图) for fellow students.

In 1919, he drew "Chinese Bulbul on Wisteria" (紫藤白头翁) and other paintings for fellow students. In that year, he participated in "May 4th" patriotic students gathering in Hangzhou. Around 1919 to 1920, he met Liu Haisu for first time in Jingjia Hill, Hangzhou.

In Spring 1920, he participated in advanced students uprising at Zhejiang First Normal School. In leisure time, he dedicatedly studies painting, calligraphy, poems and stamp carving. He drew "Desolate Crow in Sparse Forest" (疏林寒鸦) and "Forlorn Bell Rings among Mountains at Night"(晚山疏钟) for Zhao Pingfu (Rou Shi).

In 1921, he habitually imitated ancient folk calligraphy and paintings, and studies painting theory. He drew "Bright Moon above Wisteria" (紫藤明月), "Mynah in Snow" (雪景八哥) etc.

=== Career ===
In Summer, he graduated and went back to Ninghai to teach at Zhengxue Primary School. In Spring 1922, he moved to teach at the primary school in Xiaofeng County (now Anji County), Zhejiang. Together with Shen Suizhen (沈遂贞), he held an exhibition in Yizi Pavilion, Xiaofeng County. There were finger-ink painting among his works. He drew "Lonely Crow on Aged Tree" (古木寒鸦), "Pristine Water in Breeze" (长风白水), "Jigong Monk and Elephant" (济公与象), "Bald Monk" (秃头僧), etc.

In Spring 1923, he became a teacher at Republic of China female workers school in Shanghai. In that Summer, he was also appointed as a lecturer in painting practice and theory classes in department of Chinese painting at Shanghai Academy of Fine Arts. He got to know Wu Changshuo, Wang Yiting, Huang Binhong, Wu Fuzhi, and Zhu Qizhan. His style approached Wu Changshuo, evolving from unrestrained to profound. He drew "Flowers Wet with Dew in Autumn" (秋华湿露). He changed his name to "Tianshou" (天寿).

In 1924, he became a professor at Shanghai Academy of Fine Arts, started writing the book "The History of Chinese Painting". He was actively engaged in a variety of exhibitions, studying preserved ancient paintings and meeting with noted painters. He specialized in liberal-style flowers and birds painting, and also excelled in landscape painting. He drew "The Beggar" (行乞图), "Horse Fastened on Poplar" (垂杨系马), and "Fox Servant at New Year Eve" (狸奴守岁).

In January 1925, he completed "History of Chinese Painting" in Shanghai, and wrote preface of the book in Hangzhou in February. On June 20, he co-sponsored an advertisement on "Sheng Newspaper" with Liu Haisu, Zhu Wenyun and other professors, and held a charity sale exhibition for workers and citizens deceased in the May 30 riot. He drew "Mountains at Dawn" (晴峦晓色), "Soothing Spring Breeze" (春风淡荡), "Aged Plum Blossoms" (古梅), etc.

In July 1926, his "History of Chinese Painting" was published by Commercial Press. In Winter, together with Yu Jifan and Pan Booying, he co-founded Shanghai Xinhua School of Fine Arts.

In Spring 1927, Xinhua School enrolled first-year class, and Pan became the chief professor in Education Department.

Pan was appointed director of the National Academy (Zhejiang Academy of Fine Arts) by the Kuomintang Minister of Culture Chen Lifu in 1945. Two years later, he lost his appointment to Wang Rizhang, who was more acceptable to the Guomindang. Despite this professional disappointment, Pan took up his painting with renewed energy, making breakthrough works that fused modern and traditional idioms. In the era of People's Republic, he was again appointed the head of the academy in 1957 which lasted until 1966.

=== Political persecution and death ===
During the Cultural Revolution, Pan was taken by the Red Guards on 6 September 1966, and paraded the next day on the streets of Hangzhou with more than thirty of his colleagues in dunce caps to be publicly humiliated. For five years, he was regularly taken to public rallies to be criticized and renounced. He was also falsely accused of being a Kuomintang spy, after which the persecution became more intense and he was paraded in the other towns as well. He died in a hospital in Hangzhou on 5 September 1971.
