= Chinese Society for Electrical Engineering =

Engineering organization of China

The Chinese Society for Electrical Engineering (CSEE; Chinese: 中国电机工程学会) is a professional organization for electrical engineers in China. It was founded in 1934 in Shanghai, as the Chinese Society for Electrical Engineers. As of 2010, its members include over 120,000 individual engineers and over 1000 organizations.

The CSEE is a member of the China Association for Science and Technology (CAST). It includes 33 provincial societies, 56 study committees on subtopics within electrical engineering, and 12 working committees. Together with the electrical engineering organizations of several other Asian countries, it is a sponsor of the annual International Conference of Electrical Engineering. Its flagship academic journal, founded in 1964 and produced in cooperation with CAST and the China Electric Power Research Institute, is the Proceedings of the Chinese Society for Electrical Engineering.

== See also ==
- List of engineering societies
