= Zheng Shusen =

Chinese engineer and surgeon

- 郑树森
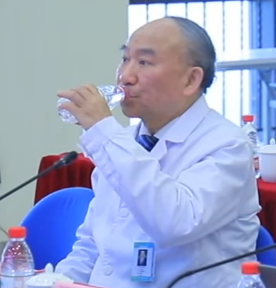
- Born: January 9, 1950 (age 76); Longyou County, Zhejiang, China
- Education: Zhejiang Medical University
- Spouse: Li Lanjuan
- Children: 1
- Scientific career
- Fields: Organ transplantation
- Workplaces: Zhejiang University

Chinese name
- Traditional Chinese: 鄭樹森
- Simplified Chinese: 郑树森
Transcriptions
Standard Mandarin
- Hanyu Pinyin: Zhèng Shùsēn

Zheng Shusen (Chinese: 郑树森; born January 9, 1950) is a Chinese engineer and surgeon. He is a liver transplant expert who is a professor and doctoral supervisor at Zhejiang University. He is an academician of the Chinese Academy of Engineering and foreign academician of the Académie Nationale de Médecine. He is internationally known for his studies on organ transplantation and hepato-pancreato-biliary surgery.

He was accused of using organs from executed prisons for research, causing a retraction of his research article published in Liver International.

== Biography ==
Zheng was born in Longyou County, Zhejiang, on January 9, 1950. After the high school, he studied, then taught, at what is now Zhejiang University School of Medicine. He earned his master's degree from the university in 1986.

== Contributions ==
In October 1991, as the first assistant, Zheng Shusen participated in the first human orthotopic liver transplantation in the Queen Mary Hospital of Hong Kong University, which became one of the top ten news in Hong Kong that year. In June 2001, Zheng Shusen performed the first living donor liver transplantation for children, creating the youngest living donor record in China at that time. He has completed 2800 cases of liver transplantation in China.

== Honours and awards ==
- November 2001 Member of the Chinese Academy of Engineering (CAE)
- 2012 Honorary academician of Surgery of Hong Kong
- 2013 Science and Technology Progress Award of the Ho Leung Ho Lee Foundation
- 2015 State Science and Technology Progress Award (Second Class)
- December 19, 2017 Foreign member of the Académie Nationale de Médecine
- 2021 Fellow of the American Institute for Medical and Biological Engineering

== Personal life ==
Zheng married Li Lanjuan, who is a hepatologist, epidemiologist, and an academician of the Chinese Academy of Engineering. The couple have a son named Zheng Jie (郑杰).

== Controversy ==
According to a February 6, 2017 report in the journal Science, the authoritative international academic journal Liver International issued an earlier statement on January 30, 2017, stating that because the authors Zheng Shusen and Yan Sheng were unable to provide proof that the sources of the organs for the 563 liver transplants referred to in the paper complied with morality, the journal decided to retract the paper, which was published online in October 2016, and would "never" publish their research in the journal. Liver International proof, the journal decided to retract Zheng's paper, which was published online in October 2016, and will "never" publish their research in the journal. Although the article and full text are still available on the Liver International website, it has been labeled as retracted with reasons for retraction based on research ethics.
