= Children's Hospital of Zhejiang University School of Medicine =

Children's Hospital of Zhejiang University School of Medicine (Chinese: 浙江大学医学院附属儿童医院)
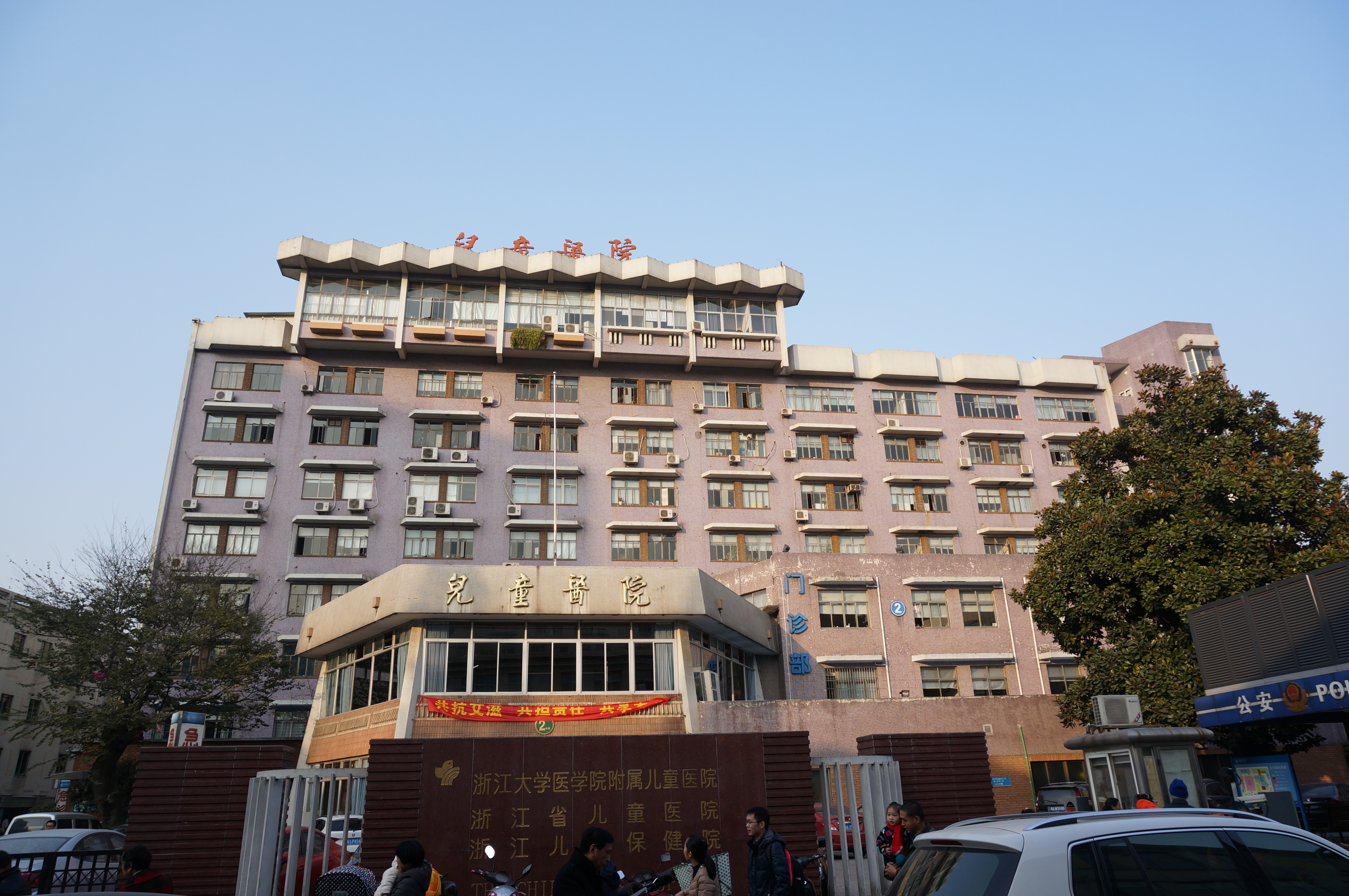
- Outpatient Building, Hubin Campus

Geography
- Location: No. 57 Zhugan Lane, Gongshu District, Hangzhou City, Zhejiang Province (Hubin Campus), China

Organisation
- Type: Public, Pediatric hospital
- Affiliated university: Zhejiang University School of Medicine

Services
- Standards: 3A
- Beds: 2,400

History
- Founded: 1951

Links
- Website: www.zjuch.cn
- Lists: Hospitals in China

The Children's Hospital of Zhejiang University School of Medicine, also called "Zhejiang Provincial Children's Hospital" or "Zhejiang Provincial Children's Health Hospital", is the largest tertiary pediatric hospital in Zhejiang Province of China. Established in 1951, it has developed into a top children's hospital in the country. The hospital has three campuses, undertaking the tasks of pediatric medical care, teaching, scientific research, child health care and emergency response to public health emergencies throughout the province.

== History ==
The history of the Children's Hospital of Zhejiang University School of Medicine is tracible to 1912, when the Affiliated Hospital of Zhejiang Medical College was established.

The hospital's predecessor was the "Zhejiang Provincial Maternal and Child Health Hospital" established in 1951. The first president was Li Yuhua.

In 1953, the hospital was separated into the Provincial Children's Health Hospital and the Zhejiang Provincial Women's Health Hospital.

In 1983, the Neonatal Intensive Care Center was jointly established with the HOPE Foundation in the United States.

In 1985, the hospital was renamed the "Children's Hospital Affiliated to Zhejiang Medical University".

In 1998, the former Zhejiang University, Hangzhou University, Zhejiang Agricultural University, and Zhejiang Medical University merged to form the new Zhejiang University, and the hospital was officially renamed "Children's Hospital of Zhejiang University School of Medicine".

In 2014, the new Binjiang Campus was opened.

In 2019, the hospital got approval for setting up the National Clinical Research Center for Child Health and the National Children's Regional Medical Center.

In 2020, the hospital passed the review for Grade A tertiary hospital.

In 2023, the Yuhang Children's Medical Center of the Hospital opened in Yuhang District of Hangzhou.

In 2024, the Moganshan Campus was opened for operation.

In the 2024 China Hospital and Specialty Reputation Ranking, the Children's Hospital of Zhejiang University School of Medicine ranked A+ (top-80) in the comprehensive hospital ranking and 3th in both Pediatric Medicine and Pediatric Surgery nationwide.

== Current situation ==
The Children's Hospital of Zhejiang University School of Medicine is the largest 3A Children hospital in Zhejiang Province, with 2,400 beds and 3,894 staff members. As of 2025, it served 3.985 million outpatients and emergency patients, discharged 11,800 inpatients, and performed more than 44,200 surgeries annually.

In education, the hospital is a teaching hospital of Zhejiang University, training students at undergraduate, master, doctoral, and post-doctoral levels. It is also a Standardized Residency Training Base.

In scientific research, the Children's Hospital totally published 63 papers listed in Nature Index for the time period of 1 July 2025 - 30 June 2026, among which 45 were in Health Sciences, ranking 174th globally and 72nd in China in healthcare. The hospital is the National clinical medical research center for children and adolescents' health and diseases, and the National regional children's medical center.

The hospital has international collaborations with Boston Children's Hospital, the Ontario Institute for Education at the University of Toronto, the Faculty of Medicine at the National University of Malaysia, and the Li Ka Shing Faculty of Medicine at the University of Hong Kong.

== Campuses ==
The Children's Hospital of Zhejiang University School of Medicine has three campuses, located at:

- No. 57 Zhugan Lane, Gongshu District, Hangzhou (Hubin Campus)
- No. 3333 Binsheng Road, Binjiang District, Hangzhou (Binjiang Campus)
- No. 66 Eryuan Road, Deqing County, Huzhou (Moganshan Campus)
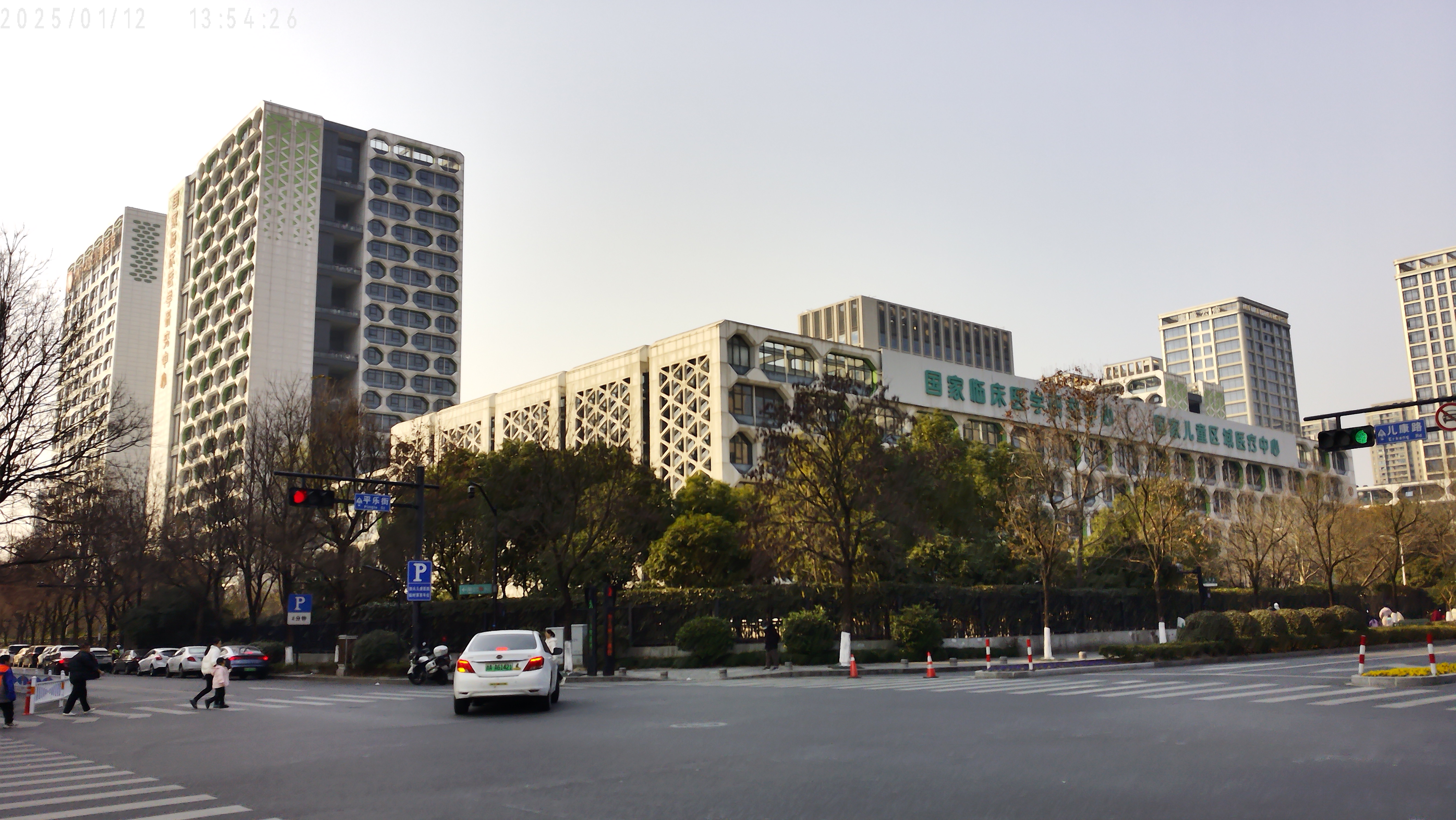

== See also ==
- Zhejiang University School of Medicine
- Zhejiang Medical University
- List of hospitals in China
