= Li Tao =

Li Tao is the name of:

People surnamed Li

- Li Tao (Five Dynasties) (898–961), official during the Five Dynasties and Song dynasty
- Li Tao (historian) (1115–1184), Song dynasty historian who authored Xu Zizhi Tongjian Changbian
- Li Tao (general) (1905–1970), Chinese general in the People's Liberation Army
- Li Tao (psychiatrist) (born 1965), Chinese psychiatrist
- Li Tao (sprinter) (born 1968), Chinese sprinter
- Li Tao (swimmer) (born 1968), Chinese male swimmer
- Li Tao (politician) (born 1971), Chinese politician, mayor of Jingmen between 2021 and 2023

People surnamed Tao

- Tao Li (born 1990), Chinese-born Singaporean female swimmer
