= First Affiliated Hospital of Zhejiang University School of Medicine =

The First Affiliated Hospital, Zhejiang University School of Medicine
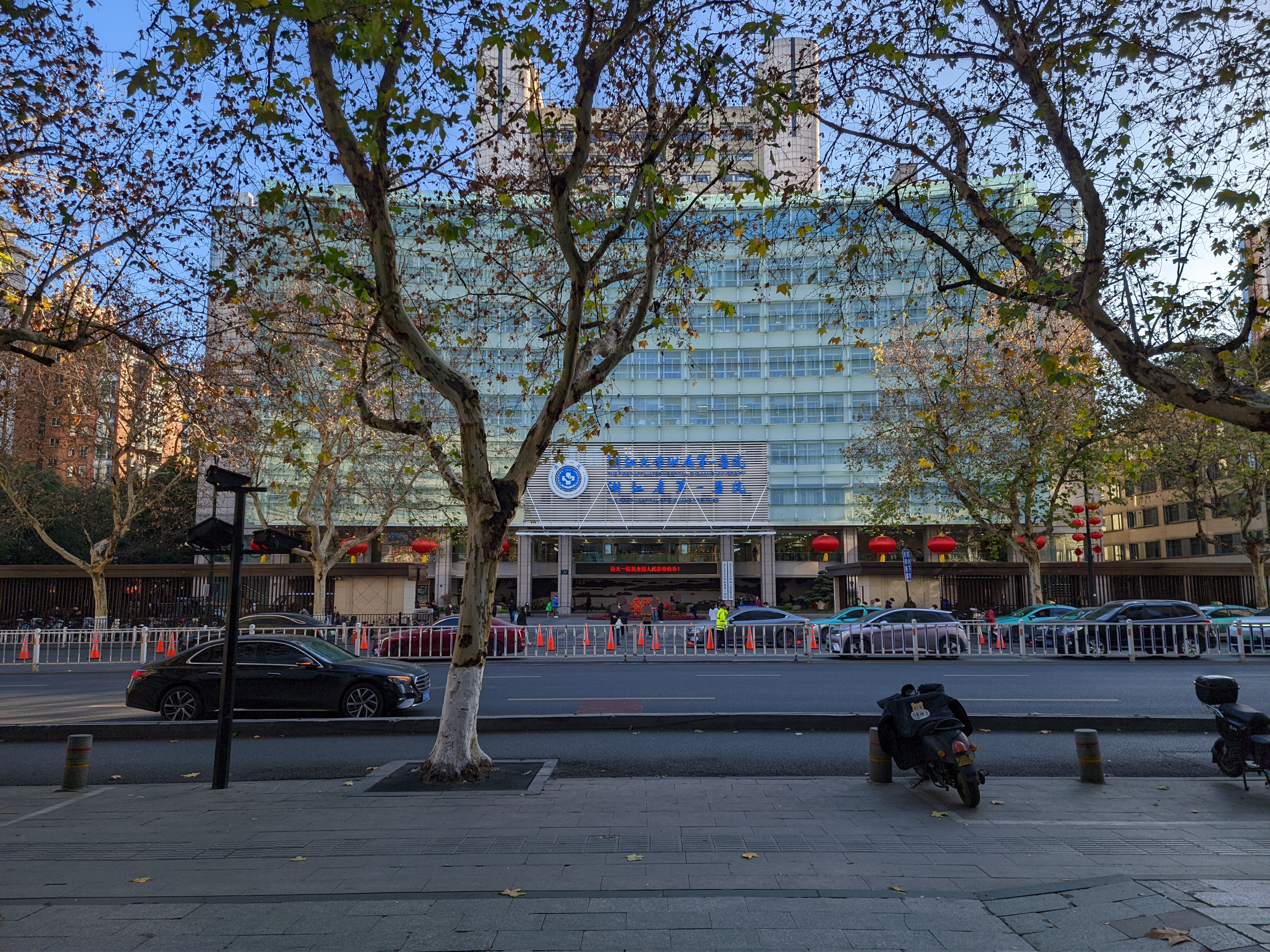
- Main entrance of Qingchun Campus

Geography
- Location: Hangzhou, Zhejiang Province, China

Organisation
- Type: Public General hospital
- Affiliated university: Zhejiang University

Services
- Standards: Grade A tertiary hospital
- Beds: 5000+

History
- Opened: November 1, 1947

Links
- Website: https://www.zy91.com/
- Lists: Hospitals in China

The First Affiliated Hospital of Zhejiang University School of Medicine (FAHZU) (浙江大学医学院附属第一医院), also known as the First Hospital of Zhejiang Province, is the oldest affiliated hospital of Zhejiang University. Founded in 1947, FAHZU has developed into a top Class A tertiary hospital in China and a National Medical Center integrating health care, medical education, scientific research and preventative care.

== History ==
On November 1, 1947, the Affiliated Hospital of National Chekiang University (Note: "Chekiang" is the old Romanization of "浙江", now commonly called "Zhejiang" according to Pinyin transcription.) School of Medicine was established by Professor Zhu Kezhen, president of the University. The first president of the hospital was Professor Wang Jiwu. At that time, the hospital had only 65 beds and was called the "Lane Hospital".

In February 1952, the Zhejiang Provincial College of Medicine and the National Chekiang University School of Medicine were merged to form Zhejiang Medical College. In April 1964, Zhejiang Medical College was promoted to Zhejiang Medical University.

In 1998, together with Zhejiang Medical University, the hospital was merged with the former Zhejiang University and four other schools to form the new Zhejiang University.

In 1999 the hospital was officially renamed the "First Affiliated Hospital of Zhejiang University School of Medicine" (also known as Zhejiang Provincial First Hospital).

In December 2004, the former Hangzhou Railway Central Hospital was merged into the First Affiliated Hospital.

== Current situation ==
The First Affiliated Hospital of Zhejiang University is a large general hospital with about 10,000 employees. There are more than 5,000 beds. Over 9.38 million outpatient and emergency visits were recorded in year 2024.

In research, the hospital has published papers on prestigious academic journals such as Nature, NEJM and Lancet, and have produced nearly 200 monographs and more than 400 patents.

In teaching, the hospital offers training programs at both undergraduate and postgraduate levels. There are 23 National Standardized Residency Training Bases (including 6 Key Specialty Base), 8 National Standardized Specialist Training Pilot Bases, 2 National Continuing Education Bases, and 2 senior doctor training programs jointly accredited by the Royal College of Surgeons of Edinburgh and the College of Surgeons of Hong Kong.

In rankings, the hospital has been listed within the top 10 hospitals in Fudan's China Hospital Ranking for years running. In the latest "Performance Review of Public Hospitals in China" released by the State Council, FAHZU ranked A++ and has remained in national top 1% for consecutive years.

In addition, the hospital has established international relationships with over 30 top institutions in the world, including Stanford University, Johns Hopkins Hospital, University of Pittsburgh, Charite Medical Center and Kyoto University. And there are partnerships with 109 municipal and county-level hospitals in China.

== Campuses ==
FAHZU has 7 campuses, including

Headquarters, also known as Yuhang Campus, is located at No. 1367, Wenyi West Road, Yuhang District. Phase I opened in 2020, with a site area of 33.3 acres and 1,200 beds. Phase II (to be available in 2027) covers a site area of 27 acres with 2,000 beds.

Qingchun Campus is located at No. 79, Qingchun Road, Shangcheng District. It was the main campus before the first phase of the headquarters was put into use. It has 1,900 beds, and a site area of over 12.5 acres.

Zhijiang Campus is located at Zhijiang National Tourism Resort, No. 366, Wutong Road, Xihu District. It was open in 2019, covering a site area of nearly 25 acres and providing 1,000 beds.

Chengzhan Campus is located at No. 58, Chengzhan Road, Shangcheng District, covering an area of 54 mu, with a total construction area of more than 30,000 square meters and 820 beds.

Qiantang Campus (under construction), located at No. 98, Xingfu South Road, Qiantang District, will cover a site area of 75 acres and provide about 2000 beds.

Beilun People's Hospital is in Beilun District, Ningbo.

== See also ==
- Zhejiang University School of Medicine
- Zhejiang Medical University
- List of hospitals in China
