= Clinical Medicine College of Hangzhou Normal University =

Medical school in Hangzhou, China

Hangzhou Normal University Medical College is a university in Hangzhou, Zhejiang Province, People's Republic of China.

It has grown out of the former Hangzhou School of Zhejiang Medical University which was founded in 1979. In 1994, the school was renamed Hangzhou Medical Junior College. In 2000, it combined with Hangzhou Nursing School (founded in 1917). In July 2001, it was merged into Hangzhou Teachers College. In March 2007, it was renamed Hangzhou Normal University Medical College as Hangzhou Teachers College was renamed Hangzhou Normal University.

The Medical College has 260 staff members, among whom 39 are professors and 80 are associate professors, including 3 doctoral supervisors and 30 master student supervisors. At present 2,405 full-time undergraduate and master's students are studying at the Medical College.

== Schools and departments ==
Medical College consists of three schools and one department:

- School of Clinical Medicine
- School of Nursing
- School of Medicine and Health Management
- Department of Basic Medicine

== M.B.B.S ==
The Bachelor of Medicine, Bachelor of Surgery degree offered by the school takes five years to complete, including four years of study and a one-year internship. Previously, it was a three-year program. Instruction is in Chinese. As of 2000, foreign students were not accepted.

=== Courses ===
- Anatomy
- Physiology
- Biochemistry
- Histology
- Embryology
- Pathology
- Pharmacology
- Forensic Medicine
- Microbiology
- Community Medicine
- Clinical Orientation
- Internal Medicine
- Surgery
- Diagnostics
- Pediatrics
- Gynecology & Obstetrics
- Otolaryngology
- Neurology
- Infectious Diseases
- Emergency Medicine.

== Hospitals ==
Medical College has 2 affiliated general hospitals, 6 non-directly affiliated hospitals, and 39 teaching hospitals

=== Hangzhou City People's Hospital ===
Affiliated Hospital of Hangzhou Normal University (Hangzhou City People's Hospital) is one of three hospitals in Zhejiang province, and focuses on health care, teaching, research, and prevention. Under the Chinese classification system, it is a tertiary hospital, and has over 1000 beds. In 2008, a new 23-story building was completed and put into use for medical care, teaching and medicinal services. More than 200 experts work in the hospital. Hangzhou City People's Hospital has 36 clinical departments and 13 medical technology departments.

The hospital has many specialized devices to meet the needs of patients in regards to diagnosis and treatment, including:

- MRI machine
- 32-slice CT
- All-digital flat-panel angiography (DSA)
- Zeiss operating microscope
- Video laryngoscope
- Excimer laser

== Research centres ==
- Department of Basic Medical Experimental Center
- Clinical Experiment Center
- Clinical skills training center
- Medical Neurobiology Laboratory
- Hangzhou Institute of Cardiovascular Research
- Institute of Nephrology
- Hangzhou radioimmunoassay
- Hangzhou, oral Quality Control Center
- Hangzhou Hospital Infection Quality Control Center

=== Key professional in Zhejiang Province ===
Clinical medicine

=== Quality courses in Zhejiang Province ===
Surgery, Obstetrics, gynecology, Pediatrics,

=== Key disciplines in Hangzhou City ===
Otolaryngology Head and Neck Surgery

=== Quality courses in Hangzhou City ===
Human anatomy, Physiology, Pharmacology

== Campus life ==
On campus there is a campus infirmary, Canteens, bank ATMs, campus supermarkets, laundries, book stores, etc. The university has various kinds of sports venues and facilities, including stadiums, outdoor courts for playing volleyball, basketball, football, venues for track and field events, swimming pools, gymnasium, etc. open to all students.

=== Outside Surroundings ===
There are some convenient living facilities such as large-scale public hospital, bank, post office, supermarket, cinema, gymnasium, Parks and so on around the campus.

=== Traffic ===
Xiasha has a very convenient transportation advantage. More than 10 bus routes are put into use from Xiasha to downtown, among which Bus Rapid Transit (BRT) B1 and B4 run every 3 to 5 minutes, and it takes only 30 to 40 minutes to reach the downtown from Xiasha. The BRT buses run between the Huang Long station and Xiasha. The subway line No.1 which is under construction now will be put into use in 2012. Then it will only take 20 minutes or so to reach the city center from Xiasha. The taxi flag-down fare in Xiasha Higher Education Zone is 5 Yuan for the first three kilometers.
