= Duan Shumin =

Chinese neuroscientist

- 段树民
- Born: 20 October 1957 (age 68); Mengcheng County, Anhui, China
- Education: Bengbu Medical College; Nantong Medical College; Kyushu University
- Scientific career
- Fields: Neuroscience
- Workplaces: Zhejiang University

Duan Shumin is a Chinese neuroscientist. He completed his undergraduate and master's degrees at Bengbu Medical College, and his Ph.D. from Kyushu University. Then he did his postdoctoral research at University of Hawaii and University of California, San Francisco. From 2000 to 2009 he served as a principal investigator in Institute of Neuroscience in Shanghai, Chinese Academy of Sciences. He was elected a member of CAS in 2007, and of TWAS in 2008.

Duan's research interests mainly focuses on synapses and neuron-glia interactions. His group found that when activated by ATP astrocytes can release glutamate through pores formed from P2X7 receptors; neuronal activities can be heterosynaptically suppressed by glia-released ATP and these ATP are released through exocytosis of lysosomes. They also clarified the mechanisms of LTP induced in neuron-glia synapses.

== Early life and education ==
In 1957 Duan was born to a worker's family. He finished his primary and secondary education at Mengcheng, Anhui. In 1966 when he was a second grade pupil, the Cultural Revolution was launched, the education system of China was heavily disturbed. During this time he read literary books such as The Gadfly, How the Steel Was Tempered, Lu Xun's essays, and popular science works like Hundred Thousand Whys.

After a year's learning in high school, he was sent to the countryside to work alongside peasants for two years. In 1977, the National Higher Education Entrance Examination was resumed, Duan was enrolled by Bengbu Medical College, majoring in clinical medicine. He graduated in 1982, and passed an exam to enter Nantong Medical College, pursuing a master's degree. At that year, only two students were matriculated by the college. In 1985 he received his degree, and became a teaching assistant at Institute of Nautical Medicine, Nantong Medical College, where he began his neuro-electrophysiology research. In October 1988, he entered Kyushu University as a scholarship student. There he studied the electrophysiological characteristics of neurotrophins using microelectrode recording technique, and was exalted by his Japanese advisors. Duan was aided with a year's tuition and fees, and during his two and a half year study he published seven papers. In March 1991 he received his Ph.D.

== Career ==
In December 1991, he was enrolled by the Postdoctoral Research Center of Shanghai Brain Research Institute, Chinese Academy of Sciences. Alongside doing postdoctoral research, Duan was also involved in the creating of brain slices electrophysiology laboratory at Institute of Nautical Medicine. After 1994 he successively served as associate researcher and director of Institute of Nautical Medicine. Between 1995 and 1999, Duan trained at Kyushu University, University of Hawaii and University of California, San Francisco.

In October 2009, Duan became the dean of Zhejiang University School of Medicine at the invitation of CAE academian Ba Denian. Ba and Duan met at a conference held at Zhejiang University in April that year. At first Duan was hesitated, but Ba said to him: "You can even elucidate what happened in a mouse's head, the administration work is easy for you", so Duan finally agreed. In 2010, an innovation group of neuropsychical diseases translational medicine was formed under Duan's direction. In 2012 he proposed the translational medicine research hospital. He also led the creating of Chinese Brain Bank, Zhejiang University School of Medicine.
