= Fang Haui-shih =

Chinese-born physiologist (1914–2012)

Fang Haui-shih (Chinese: 方懷時; 7 November 1914 – 26 March 2012) was a Chinese-born Taiwanese physiologist.

== Career ==
After graduating from the Chekiang Provincial Medical College in 1937, Fang taught at the National Kweiyang Medical College from 1938 to 1941, and the National Kiangsu Medical College from 1943 to 1947. Later that year, Fang moved to Taiwan and began teaching at National Taiwan University as an associate professor. Three years later, he was promoted to a full professorship. Fang earned his Doctor of Medicine degree from Nagoya University in 1952, and was a resident fellow at West Virginia University and Ohio State University from 1952 to 1953. He remained on the NTU faculty until 1985. During tenure at NTU, Fang held a national research chair, awarded by the National Council on Scientific Development from 1966 to 1968, was the dean of student affairs for the NTU College of Medicine from 1972 to 1978, and was elected a member of Academia Sinica in 1978.

In later life, Fang was diagnosed with glaucoma and lost much of his hearing. He fell ill with pneumonia in March 2012, was sent to National Taiwan University Hospital for treatment, then subsequently lapsed into a coma and died on 26 March 2012.
