= Huang Minlon =

Chinese organic chemist and pharmaceutical scientist

- 黃鳴龍
- Born: 3 July 1898; Yangzhou, China
- Died: 1 July 1979 (aged 80)
- Other names: Huang-Minlon, Huang Minglong
- Education: Zhejiang Provincial College of Medicine, University of Berlin (PhD 1924)
- Scientific career
- Fields: Organic chemistry and pharmaceutical science
- Workplaces: Zhejiang Provincial College of Medicine, National Southwestern Associated University, Harvard University

Huang Minlon, Huang-Minlon, or Huang Minglong (simplified Chinese: 黄鸣龙; traditional Chinese: 黃鳴龍; 3 July 1898 – 1 July 1979) was a Chinese organic chemist and pharmaceutical scientist. Huang is considered a pioneer and founder of modern pharmaceutical industries in China.

== Life ==
Huang was born in Yangzhou, Jiangsu Province on 3 July 1898, during the late Qing dynasty. In 1917, Huang graduated from Yangzhou Middle School. In 1918, Huang graduated from the Zhejiang Provincial College of Medicine (current Zhejiang University School of Medicine).

In 1924, Huang obtained PhD from the University of Berlin, Germany. In 1925, Huang went back to China and became a professor and later department head at Zhejiang Provincial College of Medicine. From 1934 to 1940, Huang worked in research in Germany and the UK.

Huang returned to China in 1940 and became a senior researcher at Academia Sinica. Huang was also a professor at the renowned wartime National Southwestern Associated University during the Japanese occupation.

Subsequently, during 1945-1952, Huang was a visiting professor at Harvard University in the US. Huang was also a visitor at Merck during this time.

In 1952, Huang returned to China. He served as the Chair of Department of Chemistry, Academy of Military Medical Sciences of PLA. Huang was also a senior researcher at the Shanghai Institute of Organic Chemistry (SIOC) of the Chinese Academy of Sciences.

Huang is regarded as one of pioneers and founders of modern pharmaceutical industries in China. Huang was a senior academician at the Chinese Academy of Sciences (1955 election). Huang was the Vice-president and later became the Honorary-president of the Chinese Society for Pharmaceutical Sciences (a.k.a. Chinese Pharmaceutical Association).

Huang published more than 100 papers, in both English and Chinese.

== Huang-Minlon modification ==
The Huang modification or Huang-Minlon modification is named after Huang Minlon, the earliest instance of an organic reaction associated with the name of a Chinese chemist. Due to the unorthodox spelling of his name as "Huang-Minlon" (making no indication of whether this was a given or family name) in the original reports of his findings, his name is often mistakenly thought to refer to two individuals.

The Huang modification is a one-pot shortcut for the Wolff-Kishner reduction, a reaction in which ketone and aldehyde carbonyls are converted to the corresponding methylene or methyl groups via the hydrazone derivative. The Huang-Minlon procedure calls for first heating the carbonyl compound, sodium or potassium hydroxide, and hydrazine hydrate (85% hydrazine) together in ethylene glycol for 1 to 2 h to form the hydrazone before removing the reflux condenser and allowing the water and excess hydrazine to boil off, after which the temperature rises to around 195 °C, and the reaction mixture is heated for another 3 to 4 h to decompose the hydrazone. Because the second step occurs under nearly anhydrous conditions, yields tend to be higher, while reaction times are sometimes dramatically shortened compared to the original version of the reaction. Even with the development of other variants of the Wolff-Kishner reaction, it remains a widely practiced version of the reaction today. Some other practical advantages include the simple experimental setup, inexpensive starting materials, and a reduced amount of solvent needed, factors which made the conditions suitable for use in China at the time, where chemical supplies were hard to come by. Huang devised this modified synthesis in 1945 while he was in the United States as a visiting professor at Harvard.

Due to its simplicity, shortened reaction times, and generally good yield, Huang's modification was a useful enough improvement that it came to displace the original procedure developed for the Wolff-Kishner reaction, and his conditions are often the ones that appear in introductory textbooks. As a result, reference works in China and a smaller number of publications in the U.S. and Europe refer to the reaction as the Wolff-Kishner-Huang reduction (or Wolff-Kishner-Huang Minlon method/reaction/reduction), or in German Wolff-Kishner/Huang-Minlon reduktion (or Wolff-Kishner-Huang-Minlon-reduktion).
