= Zhejiang University School of Medicine =

Medical school in Hangzhou, China

- 浙江大学医学院
- Type: Public (National)
- Established: 1912
- Parent institution: Zhejiang University
- Dean: Duan Shumin (段树民)
- Faculty: ~9,000
- Location: Hangzhou, Zhejiang, China; 30.29817°N 120.07940°E
- Campus: Suburban
- Website: cmm.zju.edu.cn (in Chinese) cmm.zju.edu.cn/english (in English)

The Zhejiang University School of Medicine (浙江大学医学院) is the medical school of Zhejiang University. Formerly known as Zhejiang Medical University, Zhejiang Provincial College of Medicine, Zhejiang Medical School, it is located in Hangzhou, Zhejiang Province, People's Republic of China. It's one of the oldest medical schools in China. In 2018, Zhejiang University was ranked 3rd overall in China.

== History ==
Zhejiang University School of Medicine is one of the first modern medical schools in China, and the first medical school combined with a teaching hospital.

ZJU Med has mainly two preexistences. The first one was Zhejiang Medical School (Traditional Chinese: 浙江醫學專門學校; Simplified Chinese: 浙江医学专门学校), which was founded in June 1911 (some resources mention as on 1 June 1912), by Han Qing-quan; this school was one of the first medical school in China, and later it was renamed for several times, such as the mostly-common-known Zhejiang Provincial College of Medicine (Traditional Chinese: 浙江省立醫學院; Simplified Chinese: 浙江省立医学院). The second root of ZJU Med was the National Chekiang University School of Medicine (Traditional Chinese: 國立浙江大學醫學院; Simplified Chinese: 国立浙江大学医学院; Chekiang is the old spelling/romanization for Zhejiang) which was founded in August 1945.

In February 1952, the Zhejiang Provincial College of Medicine and the National Chekiang University School of Medicine were merged to form Zhejiang Medical College (Traditional Chinese: 浙江醫學院; Simplified Chinese: 浙江医学院). In April 1964, Zhejiang Medical College was promoted to Zhejiang Medical University (Traditional Chinese: 浙江醫科大學; Simplified Chinese: 浙江医科大学).

In 1998, the four separated universities (which shared the same root: National Chekiang University), namely Hangzhou University, Zhejiang University, Zhejiang Agricultural University, and Zhejiang Medical University were reunified to establish the new Zhejiang University, and the faculty of Zhejiang Medical University became the medical faculty of the new Zhejiang University after this reunification.

The old campus of ZJU Med was just next to the famous West Lake, called the Hubin Campus of Zhejiang University. The new or present medical campus is the Zijingang Campus, which is currently the main campus of Zhejiang University.

== Faculties ==
Up to now, the total number of full-time professors has reached 966 including 451 Ph.D. supervisors, and 1001 Master's degree supervisors. Among them there are 3 members of the China Academy of Sciences, 4 members of China Academy of Engineering, 9 members of the Cheung Kong Chair Professor, 43 State "1000-elite Program" Experts (including "1000 Young Talent Plan" Professors), and 14 winners of National Science Funds for Distinguished Young Scholar. The current Dean of ZJU Med is Duan Shumin.

Currently, ZJU Med has accommodates a total of over 5,800 students, including 2500 undergraduates, 1700 Master's Candidates, 1500 Doctoral Candidates and 600 international students.

== Education and Research ==
The school is composed of 5 major departments: Basic Medicine, Public Health, Clinical Medicine, Dental Medicine and Nursing. Apart from these academic departments, there are 7 affiliated teaching hospitals. Currently, ZJU Med has 4 national key disciplines, 45 national key clinical specialties, 1 national key laboratory, 23 provincial key laboratories and "Medical Technology and Diseases Prevention" 985 Technology Innovation Platform.

Zhejiang University School of Medicine has a great platform for international cooperation and exchanges. It established collaboration with the University of California, Los Angeles School of medicine in the field of talents education, faculty development, scientific research in Translational Medicine and other medical engineering areas. It also built wide collaboration with over 20 leading medical schools overseas including Columbia University, The University of Melbourne and the University of Toronto. In the year of 2015, Zhejiang University and the University of Edinburgh Joint Institute started to enroll students together in Haining Campus.

Up to date, 19 programs have won National Science & Technology Awards including one special prize in 2017 (Theoretical Innovation and Technological Breakthrough on the Prevention and Treatment of Infectious Diseases, including preventing and controlling the spread of the H7N9 bird flu virus led by Dr. Lanjuan Li), one first prize in 2015 (The Innovation Group of Comprehensive Diagnosis and Treatment for End-Stage Liver Diseases led by Dr. Shusen Zheng and Dr. Lanjun Li) and one first prize in 2013 (Theoretical Innovation and Technological Breakthrough on Diagnosis and Treatment of Severe Hepatic Diseases project led by Dr. Lanjuan Li).

Philanthropist and movie director Run Run Shaw donated HK$341 million to help fund the university and its two medical institutes. In September 2013, the Shaw Foundation announced its latest donation - HK$200 million for Zhejiang University's two medical institutes over the next two years to "push forward medical education reform and cultivate medical talent".

== Affiliated/Teaching hospitals ==
- First Affiliated Hospital of Zhejiang University School of Medicine
- Second Affiliated Hospital of Zhejiang University School of Medicine
- Sir Run Run Shaw Hospital
- The Fourth Affiliated Hospital (located in Yiwu, Zhejiang Province)
- The Women's Hospital
- The Children's Hospital
- The Dental Hospital

There are several hospitals under construction:

- The Hangzhou Binjiang Hospital
- The Beilun People's Hospital, in Beilun District, Ningbo

== Faculty ==
- Li Tao, dean

== See also ==
In history:

- Zhejiang Medical University
- Zhejiang Provincial College of Medicine
- Hubin Campus, Zhejiang University
