= COVID-19 lockdown in China =

Chinese quarantine effort in response to the COVID-19 pandemic in Hubei

- Part of the COVID-19 pandemic in mainland China
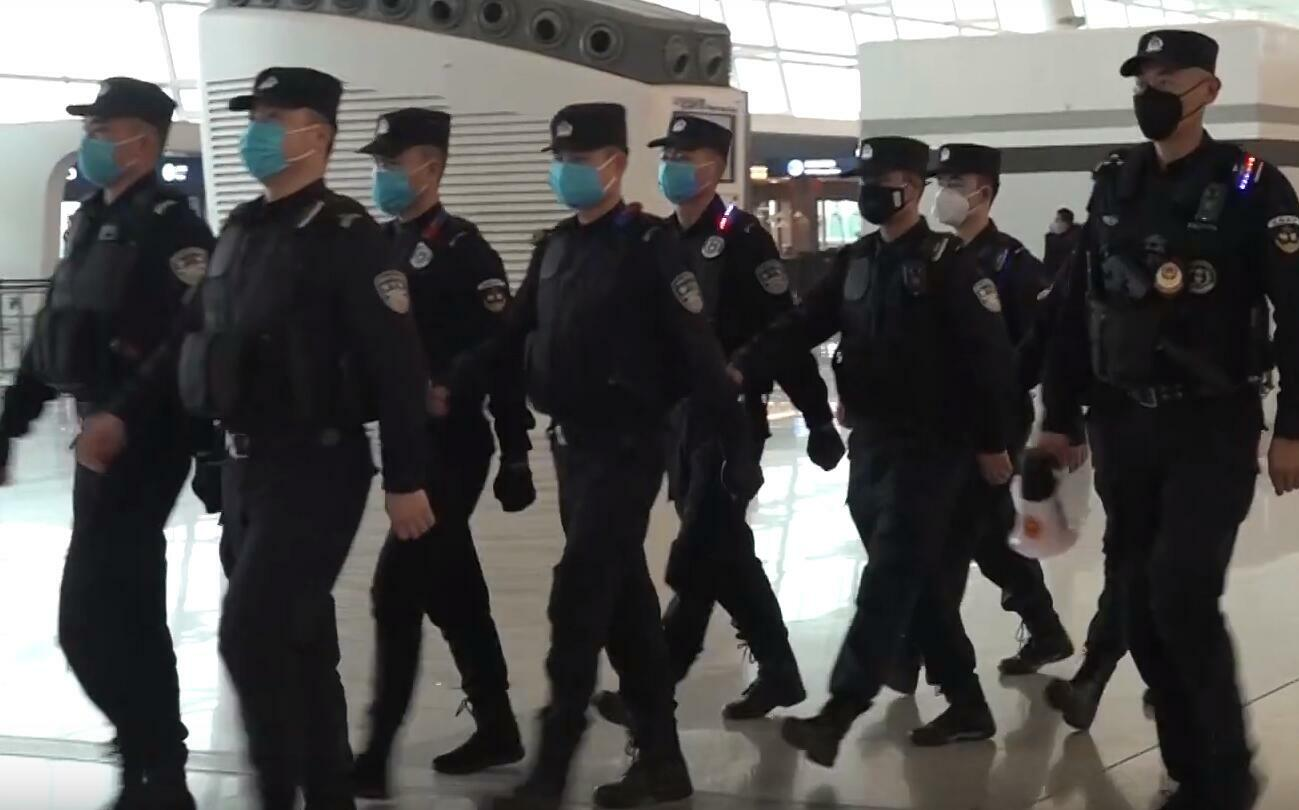
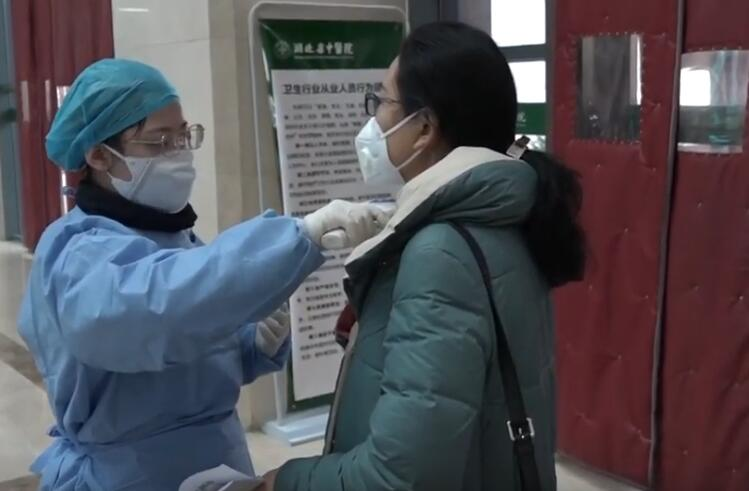
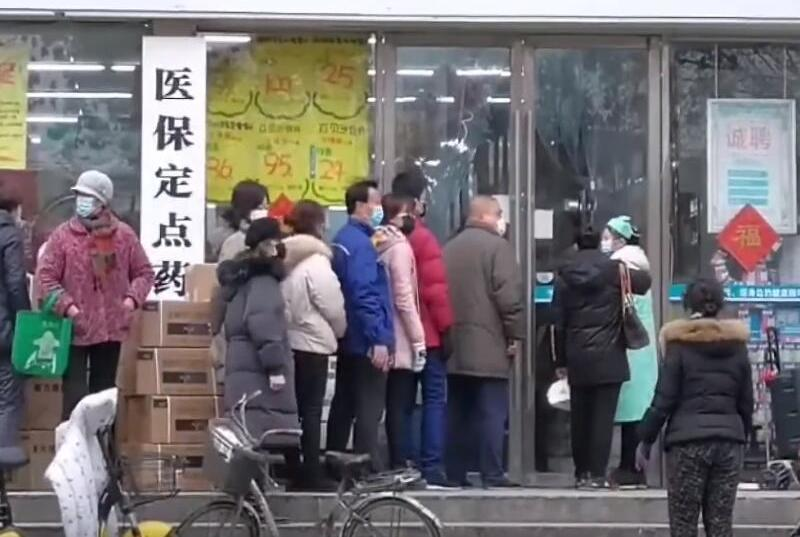
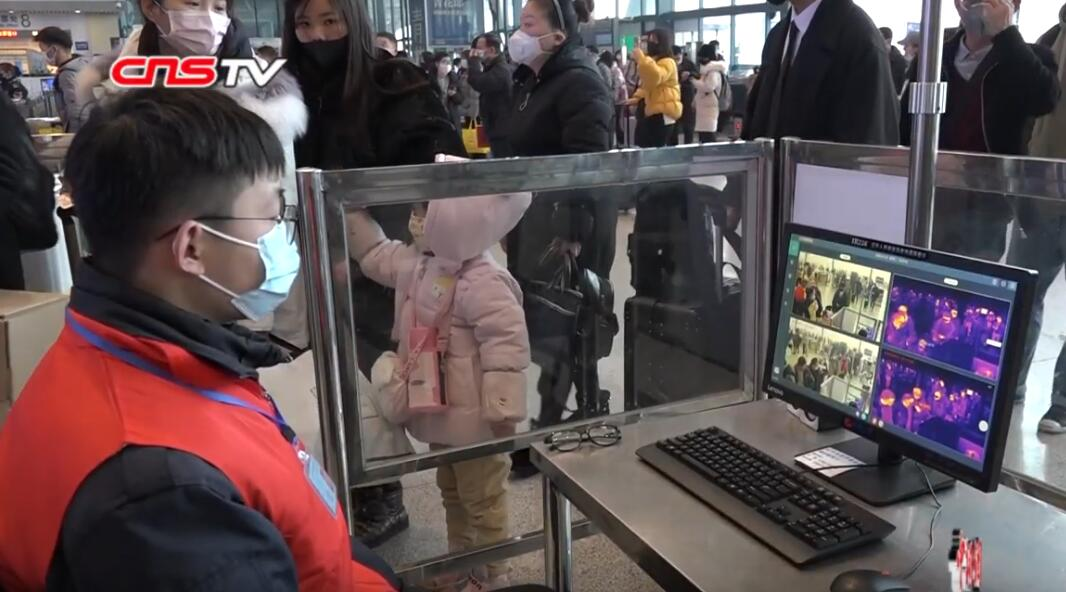
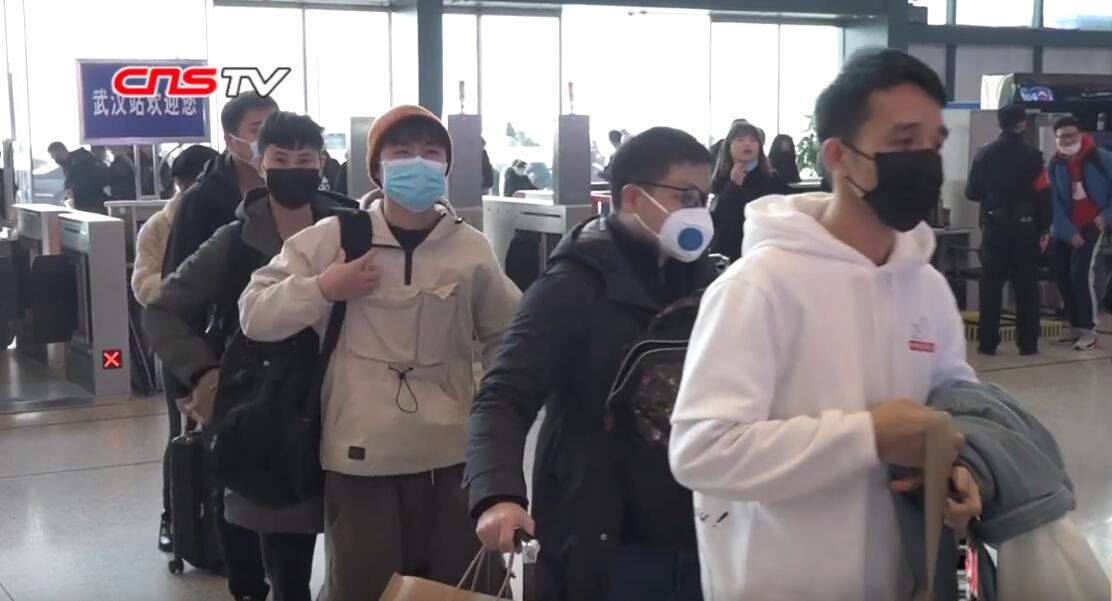
- Top: Montage of various scenes in Wuhan during the outbreak Bottom Map Legend: Areas that have been or are being blocked due to the outbreak Areas not yet blocked but with more cases
- Date: 23 January – 8 April 2020 (2 months, 2 weeks and 2 days; most of Hubei ended on 25 March 2020; Wuhan lockdown ended on 8 April 2020)
- Location: Hubei, China
- Caused by: COVID-19 pandemic
- Goals: Quarantine the region of the COVID-19 outbreak
- Methods: Suspension of all public transport, and control of movement in and out of the city
- Result: About 13 million quarantined in Wuhan; over 57 million in fifteen other cities
- Wuhan in Hubei province, China

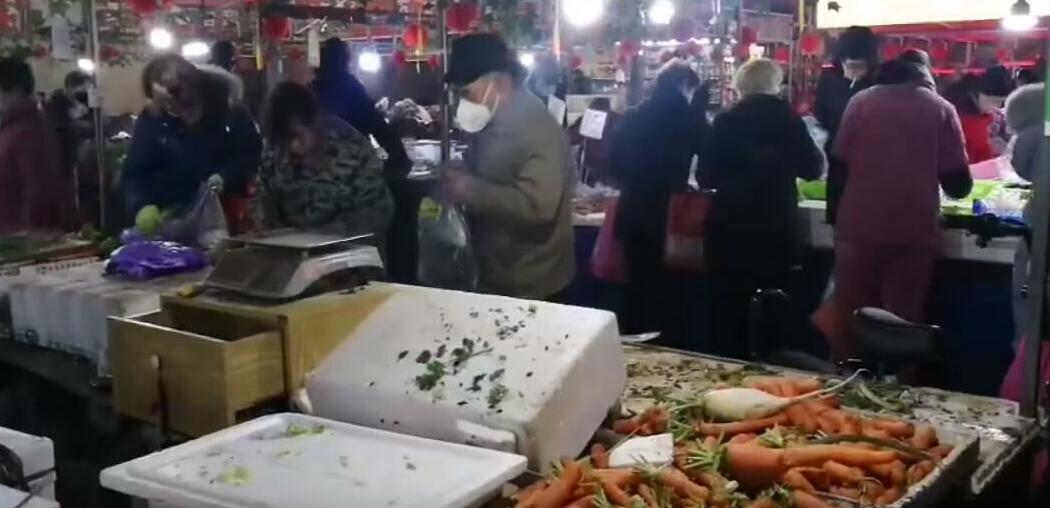
People in Wuhan rush to buy vegetables.

On 23 January 2020, the Chinese Communist Party (CCP) and the State Council of China imposed a lockdown in Wuhan and other cities in Hubei in an effort to quarantine the centre of an outbreak of COVID-19; this action was commonly referred to as the Wuhan lockdown (Chinese: 武汉封城; pinyin: Wǔhàn fēng chéng). The World Health Organization (WHO), although stating that it was beyond its own guidelines, commended the move, calling it "unprecedented in public health history". CCP general secretary Xi Jinping said he personally authorized the unprecedented lockdown of Wuhan and other cities beginning on 23 January.

The lockdown in Wuhan set the precedent for similar measures in other Chinese cities. Within hours of the Wuhan lockdown, travel restrictions were also imposed on the nearby cities of Huanggang and Ezhou, and were eventually imposed on all 15 other cities in Hubei, affecting a total of about 57 million people. On 2 February 2020, Wenzhou, Zhejiang, implemented a seven-day lockdown in which only one person per household was allowed to exit once each two days, and most of the highway exits were closed. On 13 March 2020, Huangshi and Qianjiang became the first Hubei cities to remove strict travel restrictions within part or all of their administrative confines. On 8 April 2020, the Wuhan lockdown officially ended. The lockdown, combined with other public health measures in early 2020, succeeded in suppressing virus transmission and averted a more widespread outbreak in China.

Subsequent lockdowns were introduced in other regions of China in response to localised outbreaks during the two years following. The largest of these was Shanghai in early 2022.

Some Western observers, such as Amnesty International, were initially skeptical of the lockdown; however, as the COVID-19 pandemic spread to other countries and territories, similar measures were enacted around the globe.

A series of protests in mainland China against COVID-19 lockdowns began in November 2022.

On 7 December 2022, China's National Health Commission in a 10-point announcement stipulated that negative COVID-19 tests would no longer be required, apart from vulnerable areas such as nurseries, elderly care facilities and schools.

== Background ==
Wuhan is the capital of Hubei province in China. With a population of over 11 million, it is the largest city in Hubei, the most populous city in Central China, the seventh-most populous Chinese city, and one of the nine National Central Cities of China. Wuhan lies in the eastern Jianghan Plain, on the confluence of the Yangtze River and its largest tributary, the Han River. It is a major transportation hub, with dozens of railways, roads and expressways passing through the city and connecting to other major cities. Because of its key role in domestic transport, Wuhan is known as the "Nine Provinces' Thoroughfare" (九省通衢) and sometimes referred to as "the Chicago of China".

== 2020 lockdowns ==
=== Hubei ===
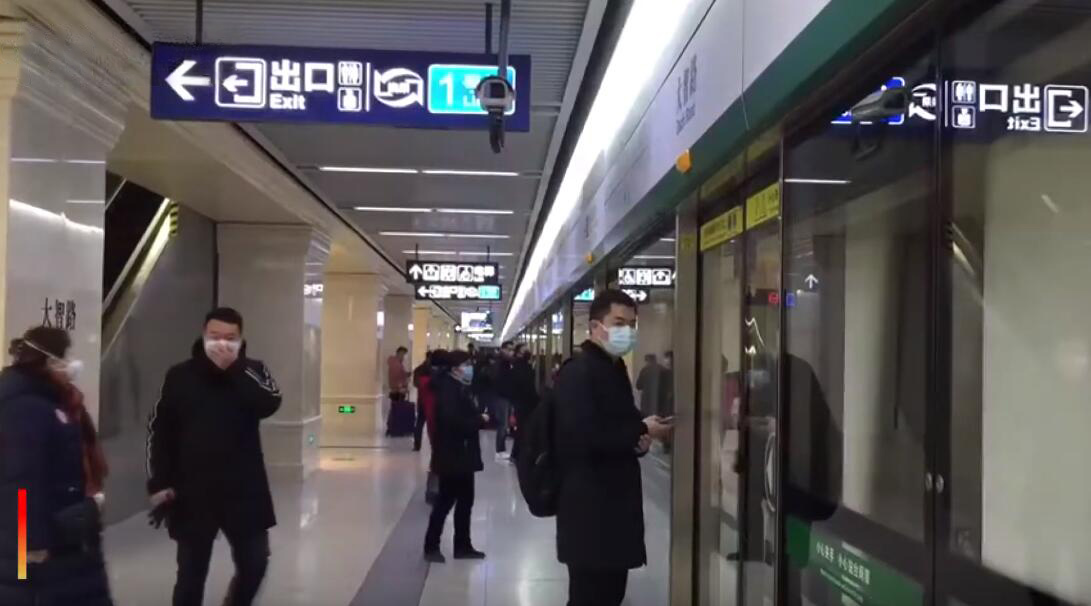
The last train on the Wuhan Metro before the lockdown

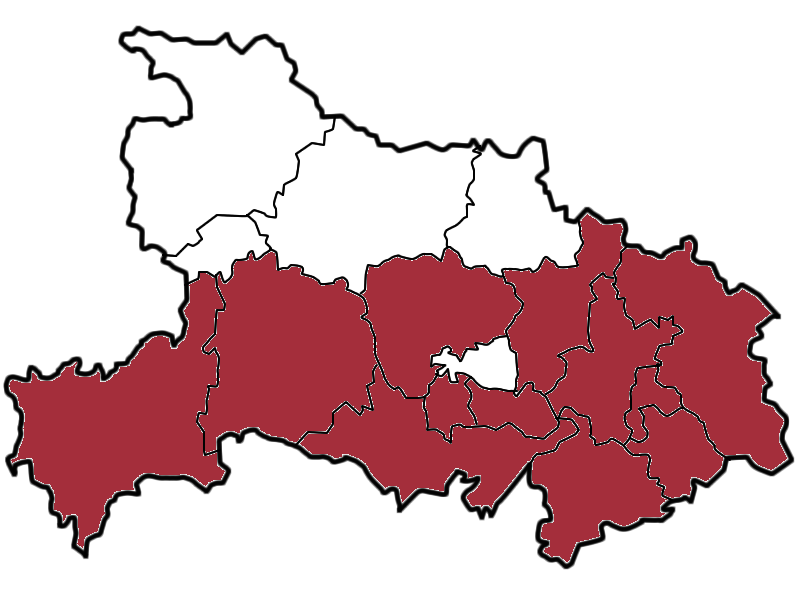
Map of locked down administrative divisions of Hubei

In mid-December 2019, the Chinese Government acknowledged an emerging cluster of people, many linked to the Huanan Seafood Wholesale Market in Wuhan, were infected with pneumonia with no clear causes. Chinese scientists subsequently linked the pneumonia to a new strain of coronavirus that was given the initial designation 2019 novel coronavirus (2019-nCoV). Some of the first symptoms appeared on 10 December, and 24 cases were later discovered to have connection to the seafood market.

Within three weeks of the first known cases, the government built sixteen large mobile hospitals in Wuhan and sent 40,000 medical staff to the city.

On 10 January 2020, the first death and 41 clinically confirmed infections caused by the coronavirus were reported.

By 22 January, the novel coronavirus had spread to major cities and provinces in China, with 571 confirmed cases and 17 deaths reported. Confirmed cases were also reported in other regions and countries, including Hong Kong, Macau, Taiwan, Thailand, Japan, South Korea, and the United States.

According to Li Lanjuan, a professor at Zhejiang University's school of medicine and member of the high-level expert team convened by the National Health Commission, she had urged a lockdown on Wuhan on several occasions between 19 January and 22 January 2020 as a last resort to contain the epidemic.

At 2 am on 23 January, authorities issued a notice informing residents of Wuhan that from 10 am, all public transport, including buses, railways, flights, and ferry services would be suspended. The Wuhan Airport, the Wuhan railway station, and the Wuhan Metro were all closed. The residents of Wuhan were also not allowed to leave the city without permission from the authorities. The notice caused an exodus from Wuhan. An estimated 300,000 people were reported to have left Wuhan by train alone before the 10 am lockdown. By the afternoon of 23 January, the authorities began shutting down some of the major highways leaving Wuhan. The lockdown came two days before the Chinese New Year, the most important festival in the country, and traditionally the peak travelling season, when millions of Chinese travel across the country.

Following the lockdown of Wuhan, public transportation systems in two of Wuhan's neighboring prefecture-level cities, Huanggang and Ezhou, were also placed on lockdown. A total of 12 other county to prefecture-level cities in Hubei, including Huangshi, Jingzhou, Yichang, Xiaogan, Jingmen, Suizhou, Xianning, Qianjiang, Xiantao, Shiyan, Tianmen, and Enshi, were placed on travelling restrictions by the end of 24 January, bringing the number of people affected by the restriction to more than 50 million.

==== Lockdown timeline ====
- 23 January: transport in Wuhan, Huanggang and Ezhou severely restricted, including closure of public transit, trains, airports, and major highways
- 24 January: travel restrictions enacted in 12 additional prefecture-level cities in Hubei
- 13 February: the Chinese government has issued extension of order to shut down all non-essential companies, including manufacturing plants, in Hubei Province until at least 24:00 on 20 February.
- 20 February: the Chinese government has issued extension of order to shut down all non-essential companies, including manufacturing plants, and all schools in Hubei Province until at least 24:00 on 10 March.
- 13 March: Huangshi removes controls and permits on road traffic within its urban area; Qianjiang does the same for its entire administrative area.
- 14 March: Hubei Sanitation and Health Committee (卫生健康委员会) Vice-chairperson Liu Dongru (柳东如) announces that only Wuhan remains a "high-risk area", and that the entirety of the rest of the province is considered medium- or "low-risk areas". Any low-risk township-level divisions, in addition to those medium- and high-risk divisions with no confirmed active cases, could lift their blockades and other mobility controls. Per China News Service reporting, by 14 March, besides the aforementioned Huangshi and Qianjiang, Yichang, Huanggang, Suizhou, Xiantao, Jingzhou, Jingmen, Shiyan, Xiangyang, Tianmen, and Shennongjia had announced "measures to lessen controls" and for industries to incrementally resume work and production.
- 17 March: Jingzhou removes its permit requirements for transport, resuming normal transport operations, and also removes entry/exit controls on xiaoqu.
- 18 March: The Hubei taskforce to control COVID-19 (湖北省新冠肺炎疫情防控指挥部) announces that, with the exception of exit/entry into Wuhan and the province as a whole, all anti-COVID-19 traffic checkpoints within the province are to be removed.
- 22 March: Wuhan loosens its two-month lockdown.
- 25 March: Hubei lifts the lockdown outside of Wuhan, although people will still need to confirm their "Green Code" health classification, designated by Alipay's monitoring system, to travel.
- 8 April: Wuhan lifts its lockdown, resumes all transportation, with residents intending to leave the city facing similar "Green Code" requirements as those in the rest of the province.

=== Elsewhere in China ===
==== Lockdowns by outdoor restrictions ====
On 1 February in Huanggang, Hubei implemented a measure whereby only one person from each household is permitted to go outside for provisions once every two days, except for medical reasons or to work at shops or pharmacies. Many cities, districts, and counties across mainland China implemented similar measures in the days following, including Wenzhou, Hangzhou, Fuzhou, Harbin, and the whole of Jiangxi.

Chinese administrative divisions with household-based outdoor restrictions
Administrative division	Division Level	Provincial division	Start date	End date	Ordinary population	Population year	Notes	Sources
Huanggang	Prefectural	Hubei	2020-02-01	2020-03-22	6,162,069	2010		
Wenzhou	Prefectural	Zhejiang	2020-02-02	2020-02-08	9,190,000	2017		
Wenling	Prefectural	Zhejiang	2020-02-02		1,366,800	2010		
Fangchenggang	Prefectural	Guangxi	2020-02-02	2020-02-08	860,100	2010		
Guigang	Prefectural	Guangxi	2020-02-02		1,562,200 (Urban only)	2010	Urban districts only	
Yuzhou, Yulin	District	Guangxi	2020-02-02	2020-02-09	900,000	2010		
Zhouzhi, Xi'an	County	Shaanxi	2020-02-02		562,768	2010	One person per household every day	
Huyi, Xi'an	District	Shaanxi	2020-02-03	2020-02-09	556,377	2010	One person per household every day	
Bengbu	Prefectural	Anhui	2020-02-03		3,164,467	2010		
Huaibei	Prefectural	Anhui	2020-02-03		2,114,276	2010		
Bincheng, Binzhou	District	Shandong	2020-02-03	2020-02-09	682,717	2010		
Taizhou	Prefectural	Zhejiang	2020-02-03		5,968,838	2010		
Hangzhou	Prefectural	Zhejiang	2020-02-04		9,806,000	2017		
Ezhou	Prefectural	Hubei	2020-02-04		1,048,668	2010		
Fuzhou	Prefectural	Fujian	2020-02-04		7,660,000	2017		
Xuzhou	Prefectural	Jiangsu	2020-02-04	2020-02-08	8,577,225	2010		
Jingdezhen	Prefectural	Jiangxi	2020-02-04	2020-03-31	1,655,000	2015		
Harbin	Prefectural	Heilongjiang	2020-02-04		10,635,971	2010		
Yicheng, Zhumadian	District	Henan	2020-02-04		721,723	2010	One person per household every five days	
Xincheng, Xi'an	District	Shaanxi	2020-02-04		589,739	2010		
Chang'an, Xi'an	District	Shaanxi	2020-02-04		1,083,285	2010		
Yanta, Xi'an	District	Shaanxi	2020-02-05		1,178,529	2010		
Lianhu, Xi'an	District	Shaanxi	2020-02-05		712,300	2015		
Ningbo	Prefectural	Zhejiang	2020-02-05		8,202,000	2018		
Hailing, Taizhou	District	Jiangsu	2020-02-05		594,656	2010		
Hefei	Prefectural	Anhui	2020-02-05		7,965,300	2017		
Fuyang	Prefectural	Anhui	2020-02-05	2020-02-08	7,599,913	2010		
Benxi	Prefectural	Liaoning	2020-02-05		1,709,538	2017		
Ngawa	Autonomous; Prefecture	Sichuan	2020-02-05		930,100	2015		
Garzê	Autonomous; Prefecture	Sichuan	2020-02-05		1,164,900	2015		
Liuzhou	Prefectural	Guangxi	2020-02-05		3,758,700	2010		
Guilin	Prefectural	Guangxi	2020-02-05		4,961,600	2015		
Jinchengjiang, Hechi	District	Guangxi	2020-02-05		330,131	2010	One person per household every day	
Jiangxi	Province	–	2020-02-06	2020-03-31	45,200,000	2013		
Xianyang	Prefectural	Shaanxi	2020-02-06		5,096,001	2010		
Jinzhou	Prefectural	Liaoning	2020-02-06		3,070,000	2010		
Kuancheng, Changchun	District	Jilin	2020-02-06		680,631	2010		
Tangshan	Prefectural	Hebei	2020-02-07		7,935,800	2018		
Baodi, Tianjin	District	Tianjin	2020-02-09		799,057	2010		
Hubei	Province	–	2020-02-16	2020-03-13; ~2020-04-08	59,020,000	2018		
Suifenhe	County	Heilongjiang	2020-04-08		69,607	2018	One person per household every three days	
All					233,511,355		Sum of census data and population estimates above	

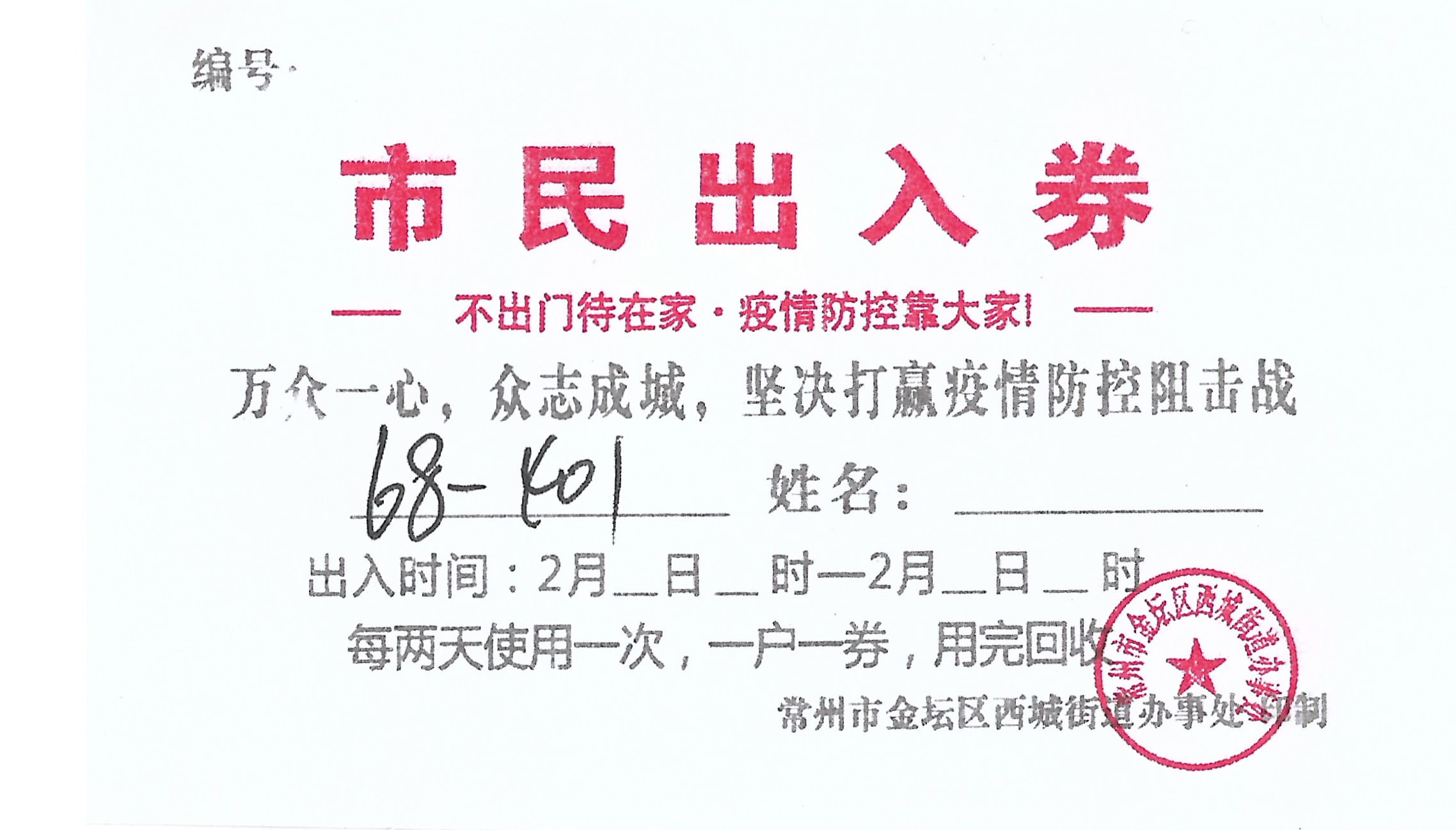
Closed management in Jintan District, Changzhou, Jiangsu, where citizens are allowed outside for purchasing once every two days with permit.

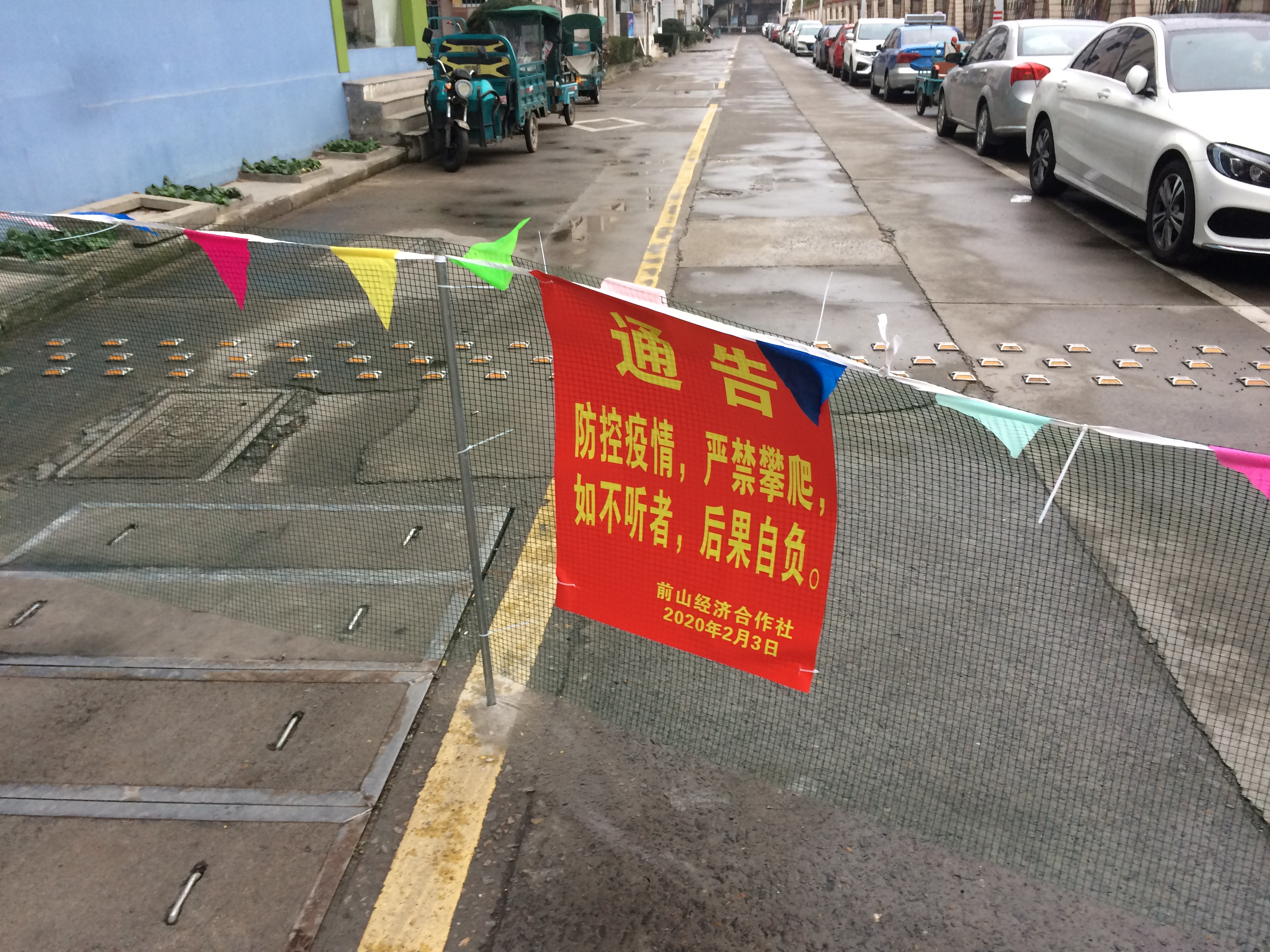
Some areas took road closure measures to avoid the spread of COVID-19. Pictured is a road closure notice on Tianhe Road, Yucheng Subdistrict, Yuhuan, Zhejiang.

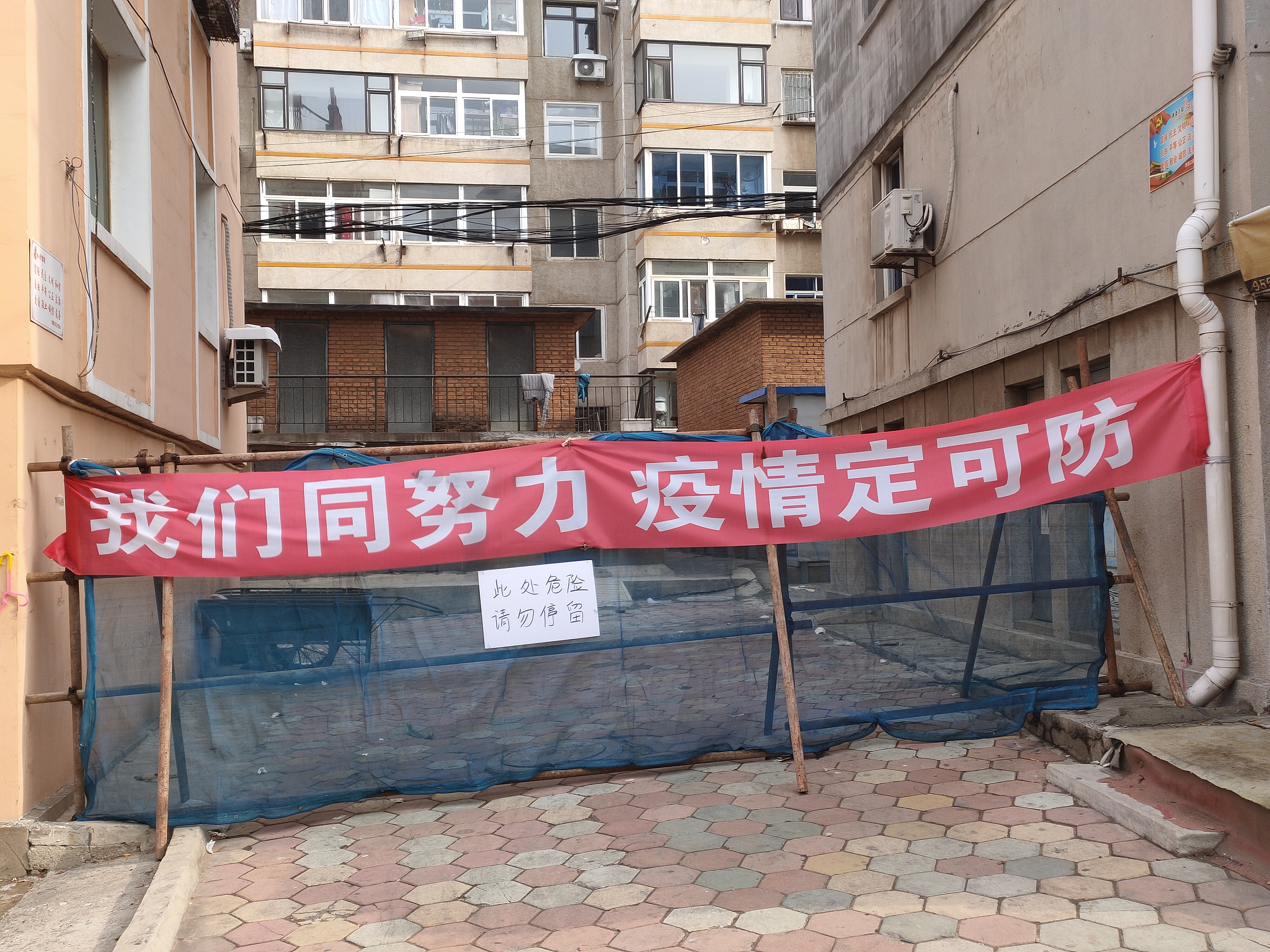
A slogan for road closure in Lyushunkou District, Dalian, Liaoning.

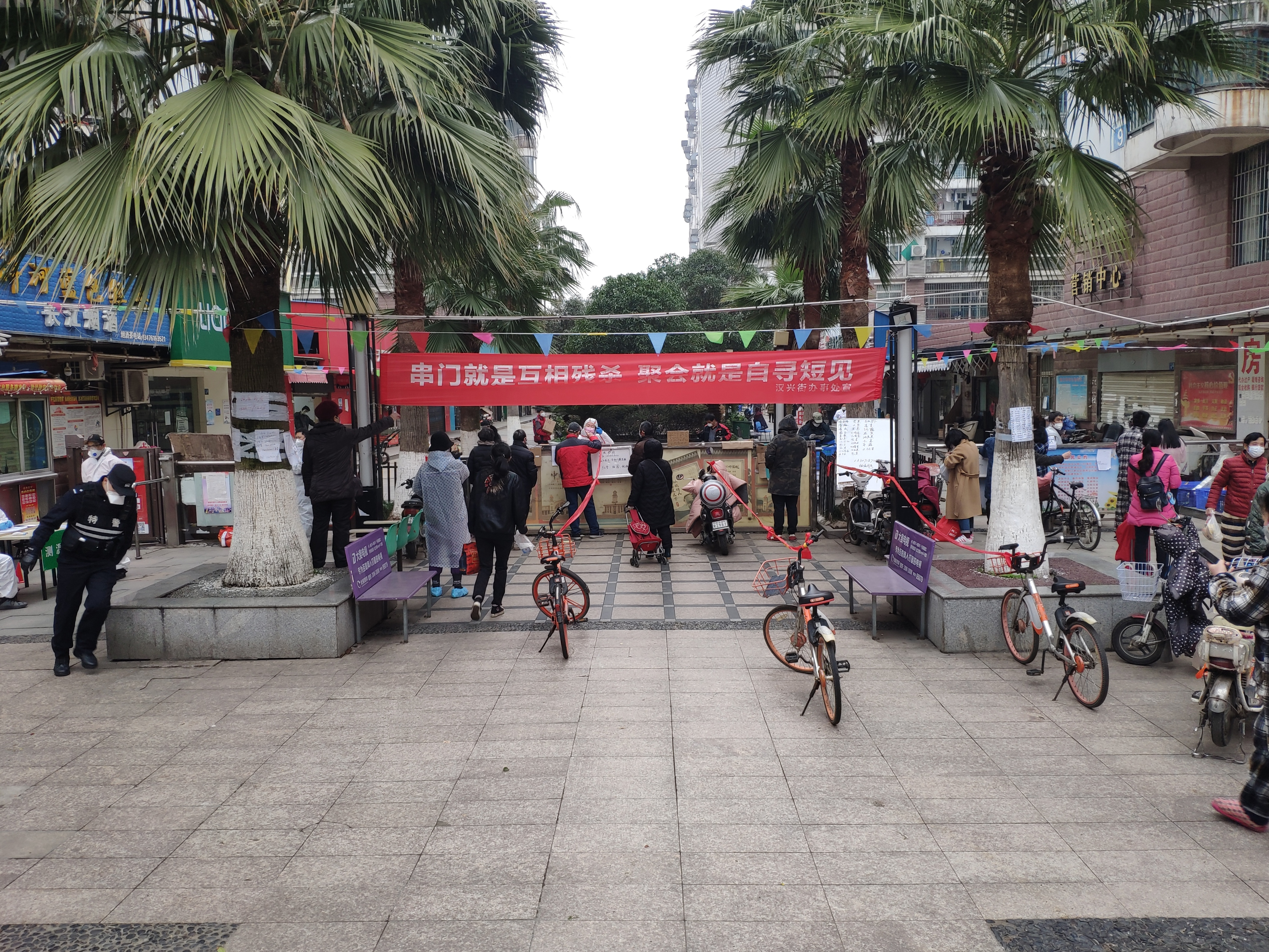
Residents in Wuhan had to buy daily necessities and food across the fence gate due to their community lockdown.

==== Closed management of communities ====
Many areas across China have implemented what is called "closed management" (Chinese: 封闭式管理; pinyin: fēngbìshì guǎnlǐ) on a community-basis. In most of the areas where this came into effect, villages, communities, and units in most areas would only keep one entrance and exit point open, and each household is allowed limited numbers of entrances and exits. In some places, night-time access is prohibited, effectively a curfew, and in extreme cases, access is prohibited throughout the day. People entering and leaving are required to wear masks and receive temperature tests. In some areas, vouchers are issued to the public, with vouchers and valid credentials. There are also areas where people are allowed to declare on WeChat mini-programs or public accounts and some apps at the same time. Courier and food delivery personnel are usually prohibited from entering. Control in communities with confirmed cases is more stringent.

List by the time of official announcement:

Closed management of communities in Mainland China during the COVID-19 outbreak
Start date	End Date	Place	Province	City level	Sources and Notes
2020-01-31	2020-03-25	Wanzhou	Chongqing	county	
2020-01-31	2020-03-25	Liangping	Chongqing	county	
2020-01-31	April 2020	Wuzhong City	Ningxia	prefecture	
2020-01-31		Yinchuan City	Ningxia	prefecture	
2020-02-02	2020-02-19	Wenzhou City	Zhejiang	prefecture	
2020-02-03	2020-04-10	Huai'an City	Jiangsu	prefecture	
2020-02-03		Jiangyin City	Jiangsu	county	
2020-02-04		Hangzhou City	Zhejiang	Sub-provincial	
2020-02-04		Ningbo City	Zhejiang	prefecture	
2020-02-04		Zhengzhou City	Henan	Sub-provincial	
2020-02-04		Zhumadian City	Henan	prefecture	
2020-02-04		Linyi City	Shandong	prefecture	
2020-02-04		Harbin City	Heilongjiang	Sub-provincial	
2020-02-04		Nanjing City	Jiangsu	Sub-provincial	
2020-02-04		Xuzhou City	Jiangsu	prefecture	until 24:00 on 8 February
2020-02-04		Changzhou City	Jiangsu	prefecture	
2020-02-04		Nantong City	Jiangsu	prefecture	
2020-02-04		Zhenjiang City	Jiangsu	prefecture	
2020-02-04		Jiangyan District	Jiangsu	county	
2020-02-04		Fuzhou City	Fujian	Sub-provincial	
2020-02-04		Jingdezhen City	Jiangxi	prefecture	
2020-02-05		Haikou City	Hainan	prefecture	
2020-02-05		Sanya City	Hainan	prefecture	
2020-02-05		Kunming City	Yunnan	Sub-provincial	
2020-02-05		Qingdao City	Shandong	prefecture	
2020-02-05		Jinan City	Shandong	Sub-provincial	
2020-02-05		Tai'an City	Shandong	prefecture	
2020-02-05		Rizhao City	Shandong	prefecture	
2020-02-05		Nanchang City	Jiangxi	Sub-provincial	
2020-02-05	2020-03-18	Hefei City	Anhui	Sub-provincial	
2020-02-05		Nanning City	Guangxi	Sub-provincial	
2020-02-05		Shijiazhuang City	Hebei	Sub-provincial	
2020-02-05		Yangzhou City	Jiangsu	prefecture	
2020-02-05		Taizhou City	Jiangsu	prefecture	
2020-02-05		Suqian City	Jiangsu	prefecture	
2020-02-05		Buning County	Jiangsu	County	
2020-02-06		—N/a	Liaoning		
2020-02-06		—N/a	Jiangxi		
2020-02-06		Jilin City	Jilin		
2020-02-06	2020-03-18	Ma'anshan City	Anhui	prefecture	
2020-02-06		Zhuhai City	Guangdong	prefecture	
2020-02-06		Ya'an City	Sichuan	prefecture	
2020-02-06		Neijiang City	Sichuan	prefecture	
2020-02-06		Suzhou City	Jiangsu	prefecture	
2020-02-07		—N/a	Hubei		Community closed management further added on 10 February
2020-02-07	2020-03-18	—N/a	Anhui		
2020-02-07		—N/a	Tianjin		
2020-02-07		Guangzhou City	Guangdong	Sub-provincial	
2020-02-07		Shenzhen City	Guangdong	prefecture	
2020-02-07		Lanzhou City	Gansu	Sub-provincial	
2020-02-07		Chengdu City	Sichuan	Sub-provincial	
2020-02-07		Suining City	Sichuan	prefecture	
2020-02-07		Guangyuan City	Sichuan	prefecture	
2020-02-07		Guiyang City	Guizhou	Sub-provincial	
2020-02-07		Zunyi City	Guizhou	prefecture	
2020-02-07		Tangshan City	Hebei	prefecture	
2020-02-07		Lianyungang City	Jiangsu	prefecture	
2020-02-07		Jiangjin District	Chongqing	county	
2020-02-08		—N/a	Chongqing		
2020-02-08		Ziyang City	Sichuan	prefecture	
2020-02-08		Foshan City	Guangdong	prefecture	
2020-02-09		Deyang City	Sichuan	prefecture	
2020-02-09		Mianyang City	Sichuan	prefecture	
2020-02-09		Huizhou City	Guangdong	prefecture	
2020-02-09		Dongguan City	Guangdong	prefecture	
2020-02-09		Hanzhong City	Shaanxi	prefecture	
2020-02-09		Wuxi City	Jiangsu	prefecture	
2020-02-10		—N/a	Beijing		
2020-02-10		—N/a	Shanghai		
2020-02-12		—N/a	Neimenggu		
2020-03-31		Jia County	Henan	County	
2020-04-08		Suifenhe City	Heilongjiang	prefecture	
14 March 2022		Shenzhen City	Guangdong	prefecture	

== Impacts and reactions ==
The exodus from Wuhan before the lockdown resulted in angry responses on the Chinese microblogging website Sina Weibo from residents in other cities who were concerned that it could result in spreading of the novel coronavirus to their cities. Some in Wuhan were concerned with the availability of provisions and especially medical supplies during the lockdown.

The World Health Organization called the Wuhan lockdown "unprecedented" and said it showed "how committed the authorities are to contain a viral breakout". However, WHO clarified that the move was not a recommendation that WHO had made and authorities have to wait and see how effective it is. The WHO separately stated that the possibility of locking down an entire city in this way was "new to science".

The CSI 300 Index, an aggregate measure of the top 300 stocks in the Shanghai and Shenzhen stock exchanges, dropped almost 3% on 23 January 2020, the biggest single-day loss in almost 9 months, after the Wuhan lockdown was announced as investors reacting to the drastic measure sought safe haven for their investments.

The unprecedented scale of this lockdown generated controversy, and at least one expert criticized this measure as "risky business" that "could very easily backfire" by forcing otherwise healthy people in Wuhan to stay in close conditions with infected people. Drawing a cordon sanitaire around a city of 11 million people raises ethical concerns. It also drew comparisons to the lockdown of the poor West Point neighbourhood in Liberia during the 2014 ebola outbreak, which was lifted after ten days.

The lockdown caused panic in the city of Wuhan, and many expressed concern about the city's ability to cope with the outbreak. At the time, some experts questioned whether the large costs of such a vast lockdown, both financially and in terms of personal liberty, would translate to effective infection control. Medical historian Howard Markel argued that the Chinese government "may now be overreacting, imposing an unjustifiable burden on the population," and said that "incremental restrictions, enforced steadily and transparently, tend to work far better than draconian measures." Others, such as Anthony Fauci, director of the National Institute of Allergy and Infectious Diseases, defended the intent behind the lockdowns, saying that they have bought the world a "delay to essentially prepare better." Mathematical epidemiologist Gerardo Chowell of Georgia State University stated that based on mathematical modelling, "containment strategies implemented in China are successfully reducing transmission."

However, as the global COVID-19 pandemic worsened, similar lockdown measures were enacted around the world. After northern Italy became a new hotspot of the outbreak in late February, the Italian government has enacted what has been called a "Wuhan-style lockdown," by quarantining nearly a dozen towns of 50,000 people in the provinces of Lombardy and Veneto. Iran, another developing hotspot for the coronavirus as of 25 February, has come under calls to assume similar lockdown procedures as China and Italy. Security experts such as Gal Luft of the Institute for the Analysis of Global Security in Washington, have said that "The best way for Iran to deal with the disease is to do precisely what China has done – quarantine." and that "If Wuhan with its 11 million population can be under quarantine, so can Tehran with its 8 million"

E-commerce contributed substantially to China's COVID-19 pandemic response by facilitating fast delivery of personal protective equipment, food, and daily use consumer goods during lockdowns.

By late 2020, public health experts estimated that the Wuhan lockdown prevented between 500,000 and 3 million infections and between 18,000 and 70,000 deaths. A November 2021 study examining data from the first half of 2020 estimated that over 347,000 deaths may have been prevented in China by COVID-19 prevention measures from 1 January 2020, to 31 July 2020. The estimate does not solely include deaths that would have occurred due to COVID-19. It includes deaths that were inadvertently prevented, such as from traffic collisions or air pollution.

== See also ==
- 2022 COVID-19 protests in China
- 2022 Ürümqi fire
