= Han Qing-quan =

Han Qingquan (simplified Chinese: 韩清泉; traditional Chinese: 韓清泉; pinyin: Hán Qīngquán; 1884–1921) was a Chinese doctor, educator and pioneer of modern medical service and public health in China.

== Biography ==
Han was born in Cixi City, Ningbo, Zhejiang Province in (Late) Qing Dynasty. His courtesy name was Shi-hong (士泓). From 1899 to 1902, Han studied in Hangzhou, at Hangzhou Yang-Zheng School (養正書塾, pre-existence of current Hangzhou No.4 Middle School and Hangzhou High School) and later at the Middle School of Hangzhou Prefecture (杭州府中學堂).

In the 28th Year of Guangxu Era (1902), Han was selected (as one of the 15) and financially supported by the Zhejiang Provincial Government and Hangzhou Prefectural Government to pursue study in Japan. During the first two years, Han was enrolled at the Kōbun Hira (Japanese: 弘文学院) and studied Japanese and general courses. During this period, Han was also a classmate and friend of Lu Xun, who later became a famous writer in China. In 1904, Han entered the Kanazawa Medical School (Japanese: 金沢医科大学, currently the Medical School of Kanazawa University) in Kanazawa. 1908, Han graduated from the medical school.

After his graduation, Han returned to China, and became a school doctor of the Zhejiang Advanced College (浙江高等學堂, current Zhejiang University) in Hangzhou. In the 3rd Year of Xuantong Era (1911), Han, along with Tang Erhe (湯爾和, later became the Minister of Education of the Republic of China, Tang was classmate of Han when they studied in Japan), co-founded the Zhejiang Hospital (浙江病院), in the Yangshi Street (洋士街, current Jiangcheng Road 江城路) in Hangzhou, which was the first modern hospital established by Chinese in Zhejiang Province. Han was the president of the hospital, and the establishment of the hospital was also mainly supported by Chen Shutong (陳叔通, a classmate of Han during their middle school years; later Chen became Vice-president of the Standing Committee of the National People's Congress of P.R.China).

On 1 June 1912, Han founded the Zhejiang Medical School (浙江醫學專門學校, later also known as the Zhejiang Provincial College of Medicine. It is the main root of current Zhjiang University School of Medicine), which was the first modern school of medicine and pharmacy founded by Chinese in China. Han was the first president of the medical school, and the Zhejiang Hospital became its teaching hospital, it was the first-time that such medical school and teaching hospital combined model appeared in mainland China.

Han died in his office in Hangzhou in 1921.

The Zhejiang Medical School was the main root of later Zhejiang Medical University and current Zhejiang University School of Medicine.

== See also ==
- Zhejiang Provincial College of Medicine
- Zhejiang Medical University
