= Sir Run Run Shaw Hospital =

Sir Run Run Shaw Hospital 邵逸夫医院
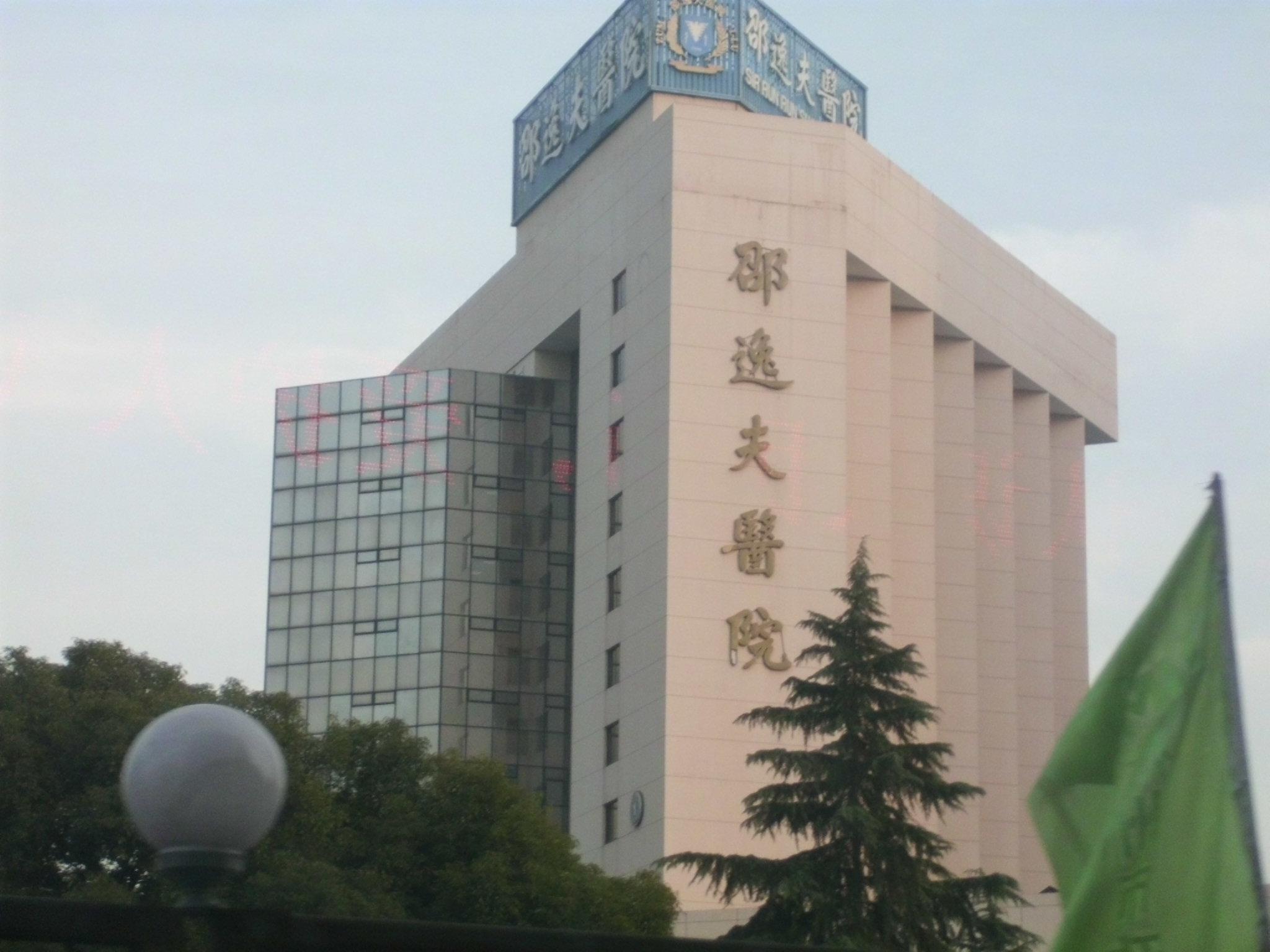

Geography
- Location: Jianggan District, Hangzhou, Zhejiang, China
- Coordinates: 30.256965°N 120.201625°E

Organisation
- Care system: Public
- Type: Teaching
- Affiliated university: Zhejiang University School of Medicine

Services
- Standards: Grade 3, Class A (三级甲等)
- Emergency department: Yes
- Beds: 1200

History
- Founded: May 1994

Links
- Website: www.srrsh.com
- Lists: Hospitals in China

Sir Run Run Shaw Hospital (SRRSH; 邵逸夫医院), or Shao Yifu Hospital, is a hospital affiliated with the Medical School of Zhejiang University, in Hangzhou, Zhejiang, China.

== Overview ==
The 1,200-bed hospital was built with a donation of about 100 million yuan from the Hong Kong media mogul and philanthropist Sir Run Run Shaw, a Zhejiang native. Construction began in October 1989 and the hospital was opened on May 2, 1994.

On December 23, 2006, the hospital became the first in mainland China accredited by the JCI, the Joint Commission International, a US-based organization for medical quality evaluation.

The hospital is also a teaching and researching base for medical students and scholars. It cooperates with and receives funding from the American Loma Linda University (LLU). It has student exchange programs with the United States, Germany, Japan, India, and Hong Kong.
