= Bengbu Medical University =

Provincial public medical school in Bengbu, Anhui, China

Coordinates: 32.9093°N 117.424°E

- 蚌埠医科大学
- Motto: 笃学、精业、修德、厚生
- Type: Public
- Established: 1958
- Location: Bengbu, Anhui, China
- Website: www.bbmu.edu.cn

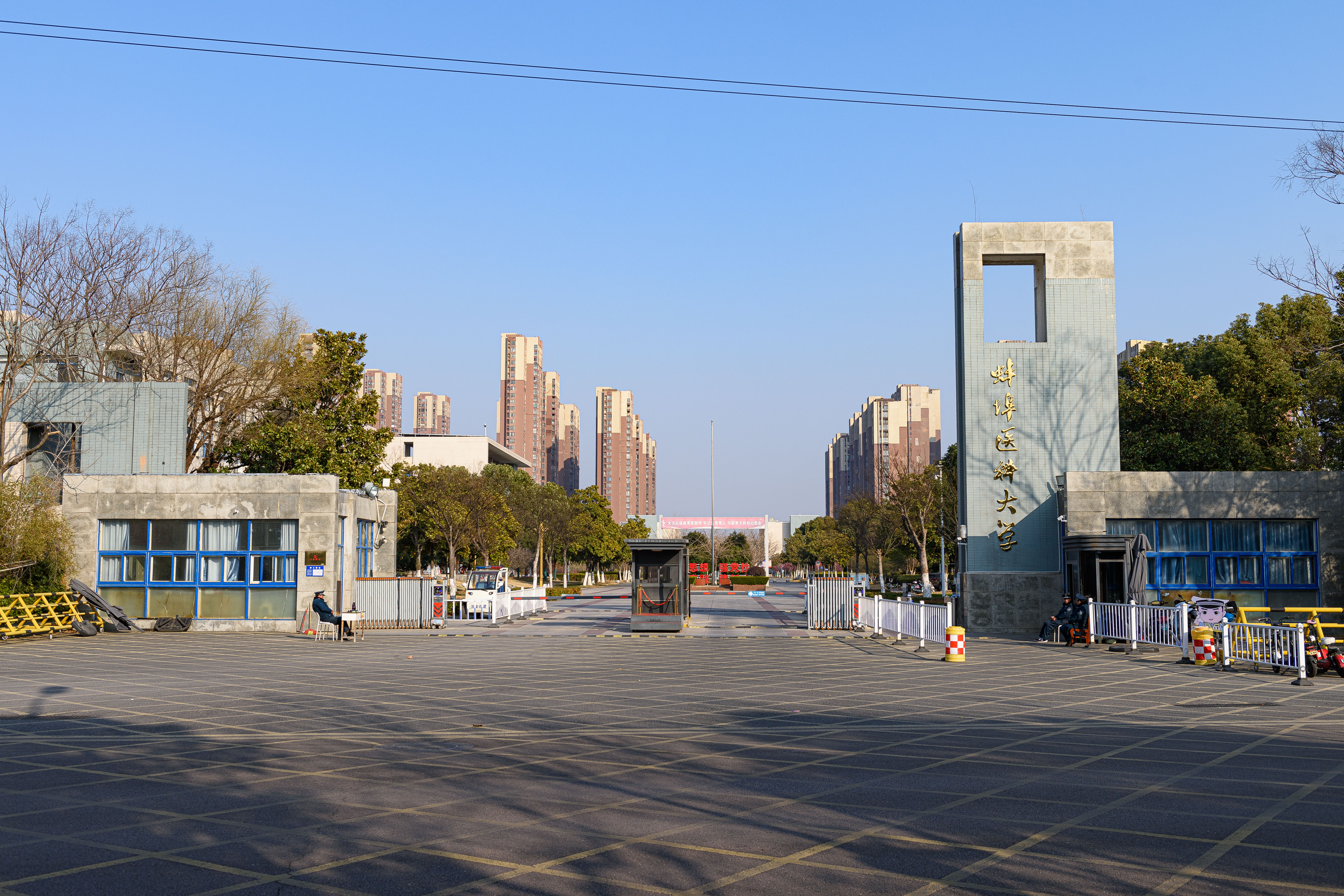
West gate

Bengbu Medical University (Chinese: 蚌埠医科大学; Chinese: 蚌埠醫科大學) was founded in July 1958. The school is located in Longzihu District, Bengbu, Anhui Province. The college currently has more than 2,000 teaching and medical staff, including more than 300 professors and associate professors. There are currently approximately 11,000 students enrolled in the college. Major faculties include biological sciences, preventive medicine, clinical medicine, medical imaging, medical laboratory, nursing, and pharmacology. There are three tertiary-level affiliated teaching hospitals with more than 8,000 inpatient beds.

== History ==
- In July 1958, the state relocated half of the former Shanghai Second Medical College (now Shanghai Jiao Tong University School of Medicine) to Bengbu, and transferred some outstanding teachers from the former Anhui Medical College (now Anhui Medical University) to establish Bengbu Medical School.
- In September 1970, the Anhui Provincial Revolutionary Committee decided to merge the four medical schools in the province into Anhui Medical College. After the merger, Bengbu Anti-Revisionist Medical College was renamed Anhui Medical College Bengbu Branch.
- In June 1974, the Science and Education Group of the State Council issued a notice to resume Bengbu Medical College.

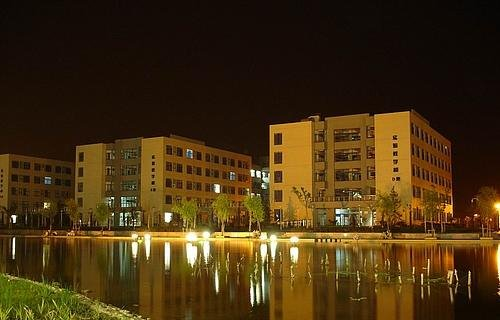
Side view of BBMC labs

== Location ==
The college is in Bengbu, Anhui Province. The address is 2600 Donghai Ave, Longzihu, Bengbu, Anhui, China.

== Education and research ==
The college offers 18 undergraduate specialties covering Clinical Medicine, Nursing, Pharmacology, Dental Medicine, and Radiology Medicine. In the postgraduate programs, it offers 15 master's degrees covering nearly all the branches of basic and clinical medicine. There are also 15 research centers and facilities in the college.

== Old and New campus ==
In September 2005 the new campus was opened. The old and new campus cover an area of 1098 acres, with a total construction area of 33 million square meters. The new campus is in the eastern outskirts of Bengbu which hosts a research center for Graphic Information Center, teaching buildings, experimental sciences building, student apartments, graduate student apartments, life service center, the administrative office building, and an integrated sports center.

== Affiliated Hospitals ==
- The First Affiliated Hospital of Bengbu Medical College (Anhui Cancer Hospital): It is the largest tertiary-level comprehensive hospital in northern Anhui. It integrates medical treatment, teaching, scientific research, prevention, rehabilitation, health care and first aid. Currently, There are 3,725 inpatient beds.
- The Second Affiliated Hospital of Bengbu Medical College: It was established in Qing Dynasty (1911) as the General Administration of the Southern Section of the Jinpu Railway. In the 10th year of the Republic of China (1921), Bengbu Hospital was established on the basis of Bengbu Pharmacy. Bengbu Railway Hospital was established in 1949. In 2004, the Bengbu Railway Central Hospital was transferred to Bengbu Medical College. In 2020, the new area of the Second Affiliated Hospital of Beng Medical University will be officially put into operation. Currently, it has 3,800 inpatient beds. It is a tertiary-level comprehensive modern hospital integrating medical treatment, teaching, scientific research, prevention and rehabilitation.
- The Third Affiliated Hospital of Bengbu Medical College (Wanbei Coal and Electricity Group General Hospital): a modern comprehensive tertiary-level hospital integrating medical treatment, teaching, scientific research, and preventive health care.

== Notable alumni ==
- Duan Shumin, alumnus of the class of 1982, was elected as an academician of the Division of Life Sciences and Medicine of Chinese Academy of Sciences in 2007

== Academic Exchanges ==
There are international academic exchange activities, with the United States, France, and other countries.

== Journal of Bengbu Medical College ==
Founded in 1976, a comprehensive national medical journal managed by Bengbu Medical College under the supervision of the Ministry of Education of China, and is distributed domestically and internationally. It mainly publishes original articles in the area of basic medicine, clinical medicine, pharmacology and preventive medicine, but also covers a wide variety of columns including reviews, case reports, methodologies and brief communications.
