= Liver International =

- Discipline: Hepatology
- Language: English
- Edited by: Luca Valenti

Publication details
- Former name: Liver
- History: 1981–present
- Publisher: John Wiley & Sons
- Frequency: Bimonthly
- Impact factor: 8.754 (2021)

Standard abbreviations
- ISO 4: Liver Int.

Indexing
- ISSN: 1478-3223 (print); 1478-3231 (web)
- LCCN: 2003243147
- OCLC no.: 740971617

Links
- Journal homepage; Online access; Online archive

Liver International is a bimonthly peer-reviewed medical journal covering hepatology. It was established in 1981 under the title Liver, obtaining its current name in 2003. It is published by John Wiley & Sons on behalf of the International Association for the Study of the Liver, of which it is the official journal. The editor-in-chief is Luca Valenti. According to the Journal Citation Reports, the journal has a 2021 impact factor of 8.754, ranking it 18th out of 93 journals in the category "Gastroenterology & Hepatology".
