= Nantong University College of Medicine =

University in Nantong, China

- 南通大学医学院
- Motto: 祈通中西,力求精进。
- Motto in English: Bridging China and the West, Striving for the Best
- Type: National
- Established: Medical College of Nantong - 1912, transformed into Nantong Medical College in 1927
- Affiliations: Nantong University
- President: Yinnan Yuan
- Faculty: ~500
- Undergraduates: ~ 6,500
- Postgraduates: ~ 2,500
- Location: Nantong, Jiangsu, China
- Nicknames: Tong da (通大, Tōngdà)
- Website: english.ntu.edu.cn

Nantong University College of Medicine (COM-NT; Chinese: 南通大学医学院) (former Nantong Medical College-Chinese: 南通医学院) is located at the mouth of the Yangtze River, Nantong City, China, 100 km north of Shanghai.

== History ==
Nantong Medical College emerged from a private Medical Institute of Nantong, founded in 1912 by Zhang Jian. It was one of the earliest medical colleges in China. It transformed into Nantong Medical University in 1927, and a Medical Faculty of Nantong College (amalgamated from three colleges of agriculture, textile and medicine) in 1928. It moved to Shanghai in August 1938 and returned to Nantong in 1946.

During the adjustment of higher education in 1952, the medical department was entitled Northern Jiangsu Medical College and renamed as Nantong Medical College in 1956. It came under the joint jurisdiction of China's Ministry of Transportation and the Jiangsu Provincial Government in 1978. Since February 2002, it has been a provincial level college.

Nantong Medical College merged with Nantong Institute of Technology and Nantong Teachers College to form Nantong University on May 18, 2004 . However, it traces its history back to the early twentieth century.

== Schools and departments ==
COM-NT offers 19 degrees, including the Faculty of Clinical Medicine, Faculty of Preventive Medicine, the Faculty of Pediatrics, the Faculty of Basic Medical Sciences, the Faculty of Nautical Medicine, the Faculty of Radiation, Diagnostic Medicine, and the Faculty of Professional Medical Training. The college has 60 departments, three research institutes, seven affiliated hospitals, and about 70 teaching (clinical training) hospitals and bases.

As a comprehensive university with a history of over ninety years. Nantong University offers a complete set of disciplines including literature, science, engineering, medicine, pedagogy, economic, law, history, and administration. The university places emphasis on training applied talents.

- School of Humanities
- School of Sciences
- School of Law and Politics
- School of Business
- School of Public Administration
- School of Education
- School of Foreign Studies
- School of Chemistry and Chemical Engineering
- School of Life Sciences
- School of Mechanical Engineering
- School of Electronics and Information
- School of Electrical Engineering
- School of Computer Science and Technology
- School of Architecture Engineering
- School of Textile and Clothing
- School of Medicine Sciences
- School of Public Health
- School of Nursing
- School of Sports Science
- School of Fine Arts and Design
- School of Geography
- Xinglin School
- School of Further Education
- Department of Neurosciences
- Department of Navigation Medicine.

== Foreign students ==
For 17 years, the university has successfully organized Chinese training courses for foreign students. Programs for international students are Chinese Language and Literature, History, International Economy and Trade, Educational Technology, Administrative Management, Business Administration, Public Administration, Nursing, Management of Human Resources, Clinical Medicine (taught in English), Preventive Medicine, Artistic Design, Fine Arts, Music, and Education (Education for Primary School).

The School of International Education was established in January 2010 and around 300 overseas students enroll in the school. All specialties, especially the specialty of clinic medicine and specialties with a focus on Chinese Culture, tradition and language, are available for international students. NTU can recruit MBBS students taught in English approved by Ministry of Education of P.R.C.

Around 145 Indian students, more than 150 Pakistanis and students from Nepal, Namibia, Afghanistan, Germany, Korea, Jordan, Bangladesh, Switzerland, USA, Holland, Australia and Japan study there.

== Location (Aerial view) ==
- Aerial View of University

== See also ==
- Nantong University
