= Li Tao (psychiatrist) =

Chinese psychiatrist

- Born: March 4, 1965 (age 61)
- Education: King's College London (PhD); West China University of Medical Sciences (MB, MD)
- Known for: Schizophrenia; Molecular genetics
- Spouse: Hu Xun
- Awards: Changjiang Scholar (2008)
- Scientific career
- Fields: Psychiatry; Schizophrenia
- Institutions: Institute of Psychiatry; West China Medical Center; Zhejiang University
- Doctoral advisors: David Collier; Liu Xiehe

Li Tao (Chinese: 李涛; pinyin: Lǐ Tāo; born 4 March 1965) is a Chinese academic psychiatrist. She is the dean of the Mental Health Center affiliated to Zhejiang University School of Medicine. She is a clinician, professor, and researcher, specialising in topics relating to molecular genetics and mental illness.

== Biography ==
As a student, Li worked at the National Center for Gene Research, Chinese Academy of Sciences.

From 2008 to 2020, Li was a professor and researcher at West China (Huaxi) Hospital, Sichuan University. She was the leader of the research team there and was on the staff at the Hospital between 1997, when she started as a postdoctoral research worker, and 2020. Li has also taught molecular genetics at Tibet University Medical Science School. As director of the Mental Health Center at West China Hospital, in 2012, she led a collaboration with the University of Massachusetts Medical School in studying tobacco addiction.

Li's work focuses on the genetics of mental illness, especially relating to hereditary schizophrenia. Her work has helped encourage further research into molecular genetics in Western China. She also studies topics relating to Tibet and psychology of the people living there. Her research and contributions have been published in Biological Psychiatry, PLoS, the American Journal of Medical Genetics, The American Journal of Psychiatry, Nature, The British Journal of Psychiatry, and Psychiatry Research.
