= Li Tao (politician) =

Chinese politician

- 李涛

Mayor of Jingmen
- In office 19 June 2021 – 4 January 2023
- Party Secretary: Wang Qiyang; Hu Yabo
- Preceded by: Sun Bing
- Succeeded by: Chen Jiawei

Personal details
- Born: January 1971 (age 55) Hanchuan, Hubei, China
- Party: Chinese Communist Party
- Education: Zhongnan University of Economics and Law

Chinese name
- Simplified Chinese: 李涛
- Traditional Chinese: 李濤
Transcriptions
Standard Mandarin
- Hanyu Pinyin: Lǐ Tāo

Li Tao (Chinese: 李涛; born January 1971) is a former Chinese politician who served as mayor of Jingmen between 2021 and 2023. He was investigated by the Central Commission for Discipline Inspection in April 2024.

== Early life and education ==
Li was born in Hanchuan, Hubei, in January 1971. In 1990, he enrolled at Zhongnan University of Economics and Law, where he majored in industrial economy. He joined the Chinese Communist Party (CCP) in January 1993, during his junior year.

== Career ==
After graduating in 1994, Li became a section member of the Hubei Provincial Economic and Trade Union Committee (later reshuffled as Hubei Provincial Economic and Trade Commission), and eventually deputy director of the Office in July 2003. In April 2005, he became deputy director of the Personnel Education Department of the State owned Assets Supervision and Administration Commission of the Hubei Provincial People's Government, rising to director in December 2005. In March 2008, he was named acting governor of Hong'an County, confirmed in the following month. After a short term as deputy director of Hubei Provincial Grain Bureau, he was appointed director of Jingmen Municipal Agriculture and Grain Office in November 2011 and was admitted to be a member of the CCP Jingmen Municipal Committee, the city's top authority. He was vice mayor in April 2016, in addition to serving as deputy party secretary of Jingmen, president of Jingmen Municipal School of Administration, and secretary of the Political and Legal Affairs Commission of the CCP Jingmen Municipal Committee. In June 2021, he rose to become mayor of Jingmen, a post he kept until January 2023. In January 2023, he was chosen as deputy head of the United Front Work Department of the CCP Jingmen Municipal Committee, a position at department level.

== Downfall ==
On 19 April 2024, Li was dismissed from his position within the CCP for "serious violations of discipline and laws".

Government offices
Preceded by Sun Bing	Mayor of Jingmen; 2021–2023	Succeeded by Chen Jiawei
