= Guanyuan Jin =

Author and traditional Chinese medicine specialist

Guanyuan Jin is a medical acupuncturist, Qigong master and Chinese herbalist in the USA. He also is a recognized expert in systems medicine, physiology, chronobiology, neurology, cardiology and oncology.

With clinical and research experience in both traditional Chinese medicine (TCM) and Western medicine, Jin has authored 25 professional textbooks, including his latest book Contemporary Medical Acupuncture - A Systems Approach.

== Life in China ==
In the late 1960s, Jin apprenticed under Master Jiao, Mianzhai of Shandong, China, one of the four pioneering acupuncturists in modern China as well as several distinigushed experts of acupuncture such as Prof. Zheng, Kuishan of Gangshu, China and Prof. Wei, Jia of Jiangxi, China. In 1982, he graduated from Zhejiang University, China, where he later taught Physiology and engaged in numerous researches on scientific acupuncture.

=== Life in America ===
After coming to the US in the late 1980s, Jin completed post-doctoral fellowship at Medical College of Wisconsin and became one of the first national board certified acupuncturists and Chinese herbologists. Currently, besides operating a busy private practice at Milwaukee, Jin holds many titles and honors including Honorary Professor (of TCM) at Guangzhou University, PRC, and the president of International Institute of Holistic Medicine, USA. He was also board chair of the Association of Chinese Scientists and Engineers (ACSE), USA, and founding president of the Society of Chinese American Professors and Scientists (SoCAPS). Dr. Jin is a strong advocate in raising public awareness of TCM through lectures at local communities as well as national and international conferences.

From 1993 to 2005, he served as the Acupuncture Advisor for the State of Wisconsin, and through his efforts, over the years, Governor Jim Doyle of Wisconsin, Mayor Tom Barret of Milwaukee, and Mayor Jeff Speaker of Brookfield all publicly proclaimed "Acupuncture and Oriental Medicine Day" and "World Tai Chi and Qigong Day".

== Selected works ==
- Contemporary Medical Acupuncture - A Systems Approach (English) 2007
- Clinical Reflexology of Acupuncture and Moxibustion (Chinese) 2004
- Self-Healing with Chinese Medicine (English)
- Cybernetic Acupuncture (Chinese)
- Whole Body Reflex Zones (English and Chinese)
- Contemporary Chronomedicine (Chinese)
- Biological Clock and Health (Chinese)
- The Art and Science of Acupuncture - An Integrative Exploration of Oriental Medicine (English)
- Wellness n Sickness (Chinese)
- The Spell of Hypertension (Chinese)
