= Zhejiang Provincial College of Medicine =

Medical college in China

Zhejiang Provincial College of Medicine (Traditional Chinese: 浙江省立醫學院; Simplified Chinese: 浙江省立医学院) was a medical college for higher education in Hangzhou, Zhejiang Province, China. It was one of main roots for the current School of Medicine, Zhejiang University (浙江大學醫學院/浙江大学医学院).

== Brief history ==
Following the 1911 Revolution, three alumni of Chekiang Higher Institutes, namely Li Suizhi, Han Qingquan, and Tang Erho, founded Chekiang Provincial Medical School (浙江医学专门学校) in September 1912, which was the first modern medical school in China, with Han assuming the first president. Upon the request of the new government, Tang Erho left Zhejiang and later founded National Medical School in Beijing in October 1912. In 1913, the school was renamed to Chekiang Provincial Medical & Pharmaceutical School (浙江公立医药专门学校). In 1931, Chekiang Provincial Hospital was founded under the college.

In October 1937, due to Japanese invasion, the school first relocated Lingying and Yuquan near Hangzhou city centre to evade Japanese air strikes, and then evacuated with the provincial government to Chun'an in the western part of Zhejiang in November and then Jinyun in December. In the spring of 1938, the university retreated to Linhai. In August 1938, with the foundation of National Yingshi University named after Chen Qimei, the school became of part of the new wartime university. With further invasion of Japan in 1941 in Tiantai, the school retreated to Jinyun again. In 1943, due to objection from school alumni, the government re-grant the school the right to recruit students independently.

With the Chinese victory in 1945, the school returned to Hangzhou in 1946, with a new campus, which is later known as Hubin Campus, coming into use. In the summer of 1947, the school was promoted to Zhejiang Provincial College of Medicine. In 1949, Kwang-Chi Hospital, which was one of the earliest modern hospitals and medical schools in China and was run by the British Church Mission Society, was taken over by the college after the Communists seized the city. In 1952, the college merged with the medical school of Zhejiang University to form a new Chekiang Medical College, which later became Zhejiang Medical University in April 1960.

1949, after the Chinese Civial War, the college was taken over by the Hangzhou Civic Military Control Committee (杭州市军管会). During 1952-1953, the Adjustment for University Colleges and Departments (中國高校院系調整 / 中国高校院系调整) started, Zhejiang University was dissociated, and its medical school, merged with the Zhejiang Provincial College of Medicine, formed the Zhejiang Medical College (浙江医学院). 1960, Zhejiang Medical College was promoted to Zhejiang Medical University (浙江医科大学). In 1998, the reunification of Zhejiang University was approved, and Zhejiang Medical University became the School of Medicine, Zhejiang University.

== Presidents ==
List of presidents from 1911 to 1951:

- HAN Qingquan (韩清泉)
- ZHU Qihui (朱其辉)
- DING Qiuzhen (丁求真)
- SHENG Zaixing (盛在珩)
- LI Bao (李宝)
- WU Cui (吴粹)
- CHENG Hao (程浩)
- WANG Ji (王佶)
- CHEN Zongtang (陈宗棠)
- JIANG Kun (蒋鵾)
