= Hubin Campus, Zhejiang University =

Defunct campus of Zhejiang University

- 浙江大学湖滨校区
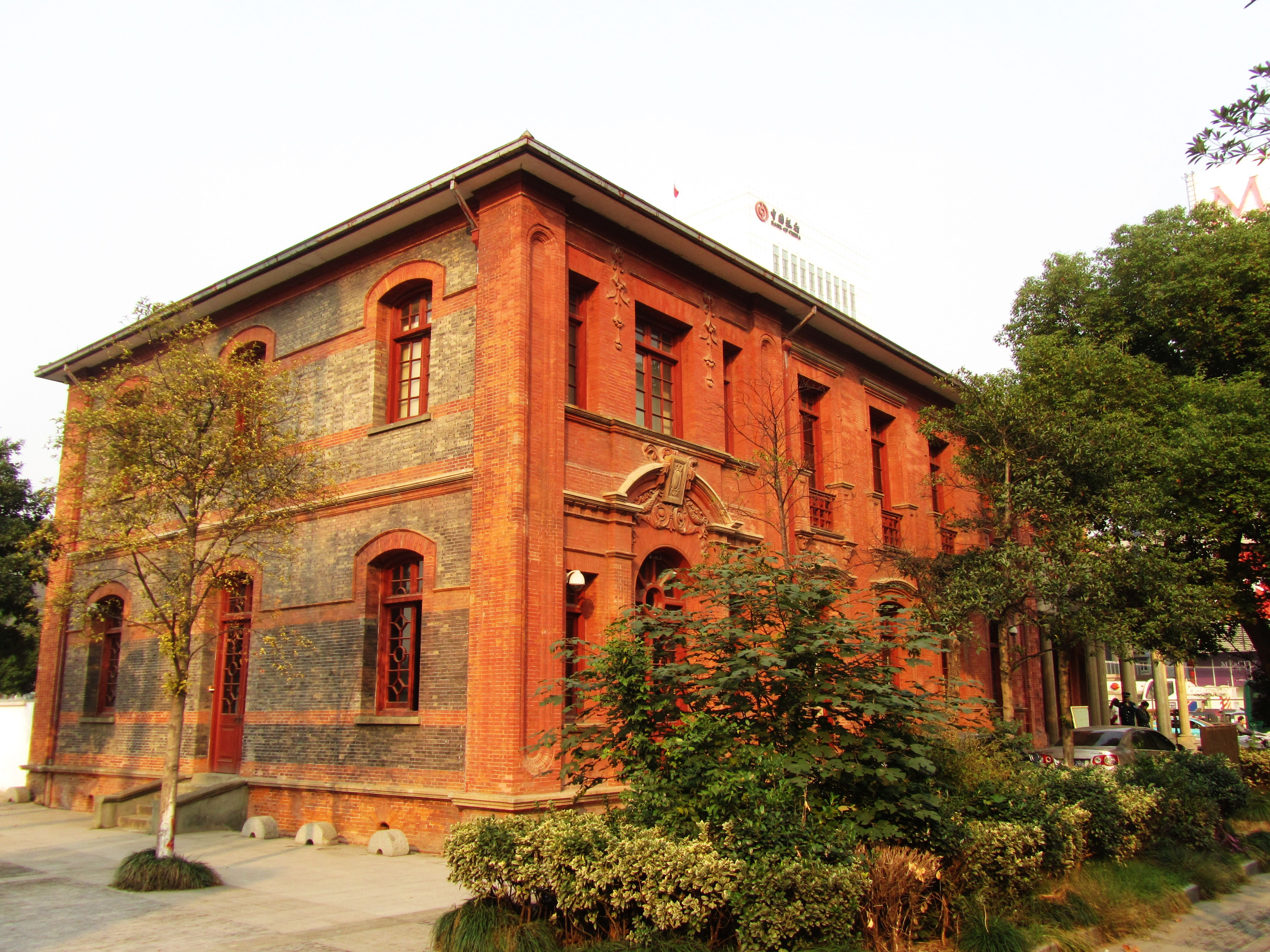
- The only remaining building of the campus
- Active: January 1946–August 2006
- Parent institution: Zhejiang University
- Location: 157 Yanan Road, Hangzhou, Zhejiang, 310006, China; 30.26208°N 120.15767°E
- Campus: 6.73 hectares (16.6 acres)

Hubin Campus (Traditional Chinese: 湖濱校區, Simplified Chinese: 湖滨校区) was an urban campus of the Zhejiang University. It was the campus of Zhejiang Medical University before it was merged into Zhejiang University in 1998.

== Buildings ==
The Main Teaching Building of the campus, as one of the tallest buildings in Hangzhou, was a landmark around the West Lake before being demolished. The campus also owned clinic departments and a hospital of 2960 beds. It was one of the centers for the medical training and research in Zhejiang Province. It had one State Key Laboratory, directed directly by the Ministry of Health, PRC; one State Key Laboratory directed by the State Pharmaceutical Administration Bureau, PRC; and three Zhejiang Provincial Key Laboratories. It had a library of half million collection, specialized on medical and pharmaceutical sciences.

== Redevelopment ==
According to the Hangzhou civic plan, the campus was sold to the Hong Kong–based Shangri-La Hotels and Resorts (Robert Kuok, 郭鶴年/郭鹤年) at a price of 2.46 billion Chinese Yuan. The teaching buildings were torn down by explosions. The land of the campus was planned to build a luxurious hotel.
