= Zhejiang Medical University =

Former university in Hangzhou, China

- 浙江医科大学
- Motto: 仁心仁术，求是求新
- Motto in English: Heart of kindness, medicine for kindness; seeking truth, seeking innovation
- Type: Public university
- Active: 1952–1998
- Affiliations: Zhejiang University
- Location: Hangzhou, Zhejiang Province, China

Zhejiang Medical University (Chinese: 浙江医科大学; Chinese: 浙江醫科大學) was a former university in Hangzhou, Zhejiang Province, China. In 1998, was merged into Zhejiang University to become its Medical School.

== History ==
In 1952 to 1953, due to the Adjustment for University Colleges and Departments (中国高校院系调整), Zhejiang University was dissociated, and its medical school was merged with Zhejiang Provincial College of Medicine to form Zhejiang Medical College (浙江医学院), which was located at the site of former Zhejiang Provincial College of Medicine. The first affiliated hospital of Zhejiang University became the first affiliated hospital of the new medical college. Kwang-Chi Hospital became the second affiliated hospital. Zhejiang Provincial Hospital became the affiliated hospital traditional Chinese medicine.

In August 1955, the college was further divided, with 278 students sent to Sichuan Medical College, Shanghai First Medical College and Beijing Medical College, as well as 45 faculty members sent to Nanjing College of Pharmacy, Shenyang College of Pharmacy, Shanghai First Medical College and Sichuan Medical College. In 1958, the Second Zhejiang Medical College, later named as Wenzhou Medical College, was established in Wenzhou, Zhejiang, with the help of Zhejiang Medical College staff. In April 1960, the college was promoted to Zhejiang Medical University. Since 1966, teaching activity was stopped due to the impact of the Cultural Revolution. Since 1968, the university began to offer one-year training for barefoot doctors in Xinchang.

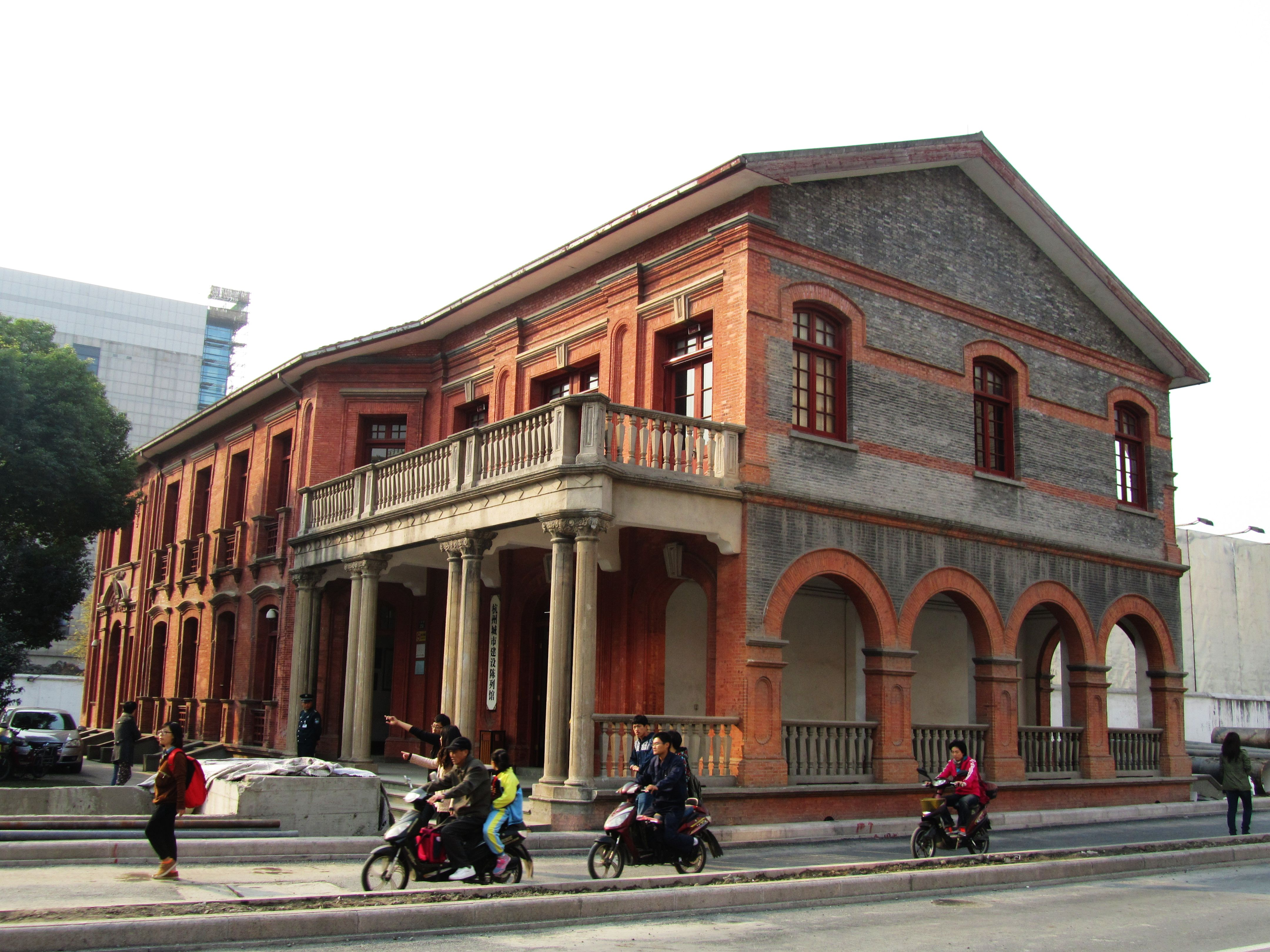
The "Red Building" of Hubin Campus, the only remaining building of the former Zhejiang Medical University campus

In July 1970, Zhejiang College of Traditional Chinese Medicine was merged into the university. In November 1970, the university restarted to recruit students. In 1973, Zhejiang College of Traditional Chinese Medicine was again separated from the university, along with the affiliated hospital of traditional Chinese medicine. In 1988, the university became among the first batch of 15 medical universities to offer 7-year medical education. In 1989, Hong Kong tycoon Sir Run Run Shaw donated a new, superb western style hospital to Zhejiang, his home province. The hospital was named after him and became an affiliated hospital of Zhejiang Medical University, with Loma Linda University Health providing training for local doctors. The hospital came into use in 1994 and remains among top hospitals in China.

In 1998, Zhejiang Medical University was merged into Zhejiang University as Zhejiang University School of Medicine.

== The campus ==
The university originally located aside the famous West Lake in Hangzhou. Its campus was the Hubin Campus, which later became a main medical campus of Zhejiang University. Due to the new civic plan for Hangzhou downtown, the campus was sold to the Hong Kong–based Shangri-La Hotels and Resorts (Robert Kuok, 郭鶴年/郭鹤年) at a price of 2.46 billion Chinese Yuan.

The main teaching building of the university was the highest skyscraper around the West Lake, and was one of the tallest in Hangzhou City. The teaching buildings were torn down by explosions. The land of the campus is planned to build a luxurious hotel and currently under dense constructions. Most of the campus of Zhejiang Medical University was demolished in January 2007.

== The university ==
The university and its teaching hospital originally had a total faculty of more than 9000, including one academician of the Chinese Academy of Sciences (CAS) and three from the Chinese Academy of Engineering (CAE). The whole university faculty and students were merged into the Zhejiang University in 1998, and became the School of Medicine of Zhejiang University. The reunification was finished in 1999.

== President ==
List of presidents:

School name	Office period	Name (in Chinese)	Title (in Chinese)
Zhejiang Medical College	Oct 1951 - Apr 1955	Hong Shilu (洪式闾)	President (院长（兼）)
Zhejiang Medical College	May 1956 - Sep 1958	Wang Zhongqiao (王仲侨)	President (院长)
Zhejiang Medical University	Feb 1960 - Sep 1963	Zheng Ping (郑平)	President (校长（兼）)
Zhejiang Medical University	Mar 1964 - Nov 1968	Li Lanyan (李兰炎)	President (校长（兼）)
Zhejiang Medical University	Jul 1978 - Mar 1979	Wang Yaoting (王耀庭)	President (校长（兼）)
Zhejiang Medical University	Mar 1979 - Jan 1984	Wang Jiwu (王季午)	President (校长)
Zhejiang Medical University	Jan 1984 - Nov 1996	Zheng Shu (郑树)	President (校长)
Zhejiang Medical University	Nov 1996 - Sep 1998	Chen Zhaodian (陈昭典)	President (校长)
Zhejiang Medical University	Jan 1984 - Sep 1998	Wang Jiwu (王季午)	Honorary President (名誉校长)

== See also ==
- Zhejiang University
- Zhejiang Provincial College of Medicine
- Hubin Campus, Zhejiang University

== Famous Graduates ==
Jin Guanyuan, acupuncturist
