= Hu Hesheng =

Chinese mathematician (1928–2024)

- 胡和生
- Born: 20 June 1928; Shanghai, Republic of China
- Died: 2 February 2024 (aged 95)
- Education: Zhejiang University
- Known for: Research in differential geometry and mathematical physics
- Scientific career
- Fields: Mathematics
- Workplaces: Fudan University
- Doctoral advisor: Su Buqing

Hu Hesheng (Chinese: 胡和生; pinyin: Hú Héshēng; 20 June 1928 – 2 February 2024) was a Chinese mathematician. She served as vice-president of Chinese Mathematical Society, president of the Shanghai Mathematical Society, and was an academician of Chinese Academy of Sciences. She gave the Noether Lecture in 2002.

== Education and career ==
Born in Shanghai, Hu studied mathematics at National Chiao Tung University (now Shanghai Jiaotong University) and Great China University. She received her master's degree in mathematics from Zhejiang University in 1952, under the supervision of Su Buqing. From 1952 to 1956, she was a researcher at the Institute of Mathematics of the Chinese Academy of Sciences. In 1956, she began working as a lecturer at Fudan University in Shanghai, later becoming an associate professor and eventually achieving full-time professorship.

== Service and recognition ==
Hu served as vice president of the Chinese Mathematical Society and president of the Shanghai Mathematical Society. In 2002, she was chosen as the Emmy Noether Lecturer for that year's International Congress of Mathematicians in Beijing, China. She was elected as an academician of the Chinese Academy of Sciences in 1991 and as an academician of the Third World Academy of Science in 2003.

== Research ==
Her main academic interests were differential geometry and mathematical physics. She led a research group at Fudan University during the 1980s and 1990s.

== Personal life and death ==
Hu's husband was Gu Chaohao, also a mathematician, who served as the president of University of Science and Technology of China. They were married until his death in 2012.

Hu Hesheng died on 2 February 2024, at the age of 95.
