= Hu Dunfu =

Chinese mathematician and educator

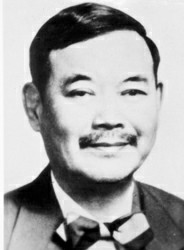
- Born: 1886; Wuxi, Jiangsu, China
- Died: December 1, 1978 (aged 91–92); Seattle, Washington, U.S.
- Other name: Hu Tun-fu
- Citizenship: Chinese
- Education: Cornell University
- Occupations: Mathematician, educator
- Employer(s): Tsinghua University, Utopia University, University of Washington
- Known for: First president of the Chinese Mathematical Society, founder of Utopia University
- Scientific career
- Fields: Mathematics

Hu Dunfu (Chinese: 胡敦復; Wade–Giles: Hu Tun-fu; 1886 – December 1, 1978) was a Chinese mathematician and pioneer in higher education. He won a Qing government scholarship to study at Cornell University, and became the first dean of Tsinghua University at the age of 25. He was then briefly dean of Fudan University, before establishing Utopia University in 1912 and developing it into one of China's best private universities. He also served as head of the mathematics department of National Chiao Tung University and the first president of the Chinese Mathematical Society, which he co-founded in 1935.

== Early life and education ==
Hu Dunfu was born in 1886 into a prominent family of scholar-officials in Wuxi, Jiangsu Province, a descendant of the Song dynasty Confucian scholar and educator Hu Yuan (胡瑗; 993–1059). When he was 11, he was admitted by the elementary school of Nanyang Public School (now Shanghai Jiao Tong University), and later attended its secondary school. When his teacher Ma Xiangbo left Nanyang to establish Aurora University and later Fudan University, Hu, together with Huang Yanpei and others, followed Ma and became the first students at Aurora and then Fudan.

In June 1907, Hu won a government scholarship to study in the United States, and entered Cornell University in September. He earned a bachelor's degree in mathematics in only two years, and returned to China in August 1909.

== Career in China ==
In April 1911, the U.S. government established Tsinghua College in Beijing, using part of the Boxer indemnity payment made by the Qing dynasty. Hu Dunfu was hired as the first dean of Tsinghua, at the age of 25. In summer, eleven Tsinghua faculty members established Lida Society to promote education in China, with Hu as its head. In November 1911, during the Xinhai Revolution, the Lida Society members resigned from Tsinghua after disagreements with the college's American administrators, and left Beijing for Shanghai. Hu was hired by Ma Xiangbo as dean of Fudan University, but soon left the school after a student strike.

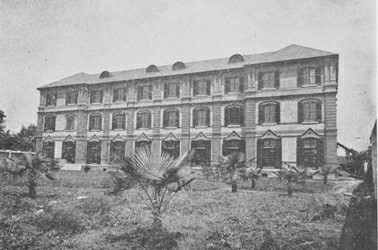
Utopia University, founded by Hu Dunfu in 1912

In March 1912, Hu and his colleagues of Lida Society founded Utopia School in Nanshi, Shanghai, with Hu as its first president. Under his leadership, Utopia was certified as a university in 1922, and developed into one of the two most reputable private universities in China, the other being Nankai University in Tianjin.

After Hu's friend Li Zhaohuan became the president of National Chiao Tung University (NCTU), he invited Hu to help build NCTU's mathematics program. Hu thus became head of NCTU's mathematics department in 1930. In July 1935, Hu, together with other leading Chinese mathematicians including Feng Zuxun, Xiong Qinglai, Chen Jiangong, and Su Buqing, established the Chinese Mathematical Society at a meeting held in the library of NCTU. Hu served as the first president of the society.

As the Chinese Communist Party defeated the Kuomintang in the Chinese Civil War, Hu Dunfu followed the retreating Kuomintang government to Taiwan in 1949. The new Communist government of the People's Republic of China closed Utopia along with many other private schools in 1952, and its departments were split up and merged into six public universities in Shanghai. Hu tried to re-establish Utopia University in Taiwan, but was ultimately unsuccessful.

== Later life in the United States ==
Hu later moved to the United States, where he taught at the University of Washington until his retirement in 1962. He died on December 1, 1978, in Seattle, at the age of 92.
