= Utopia University =

University in China (1912–1952)

- 大同大學
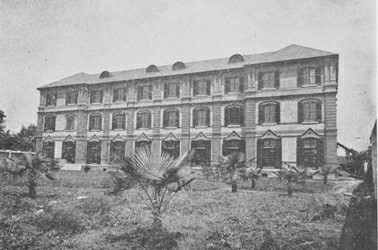
- Former names: Utopia School
- Type: Private
- Active: 1912–1952
- President: Hu Dunfu
- Students: 2,700 (1948)
- Location: Shanghai, China

Utopia University
- Traditional Chinese: 大同大學
- Simplified Chinese: 大同大学
Transcriptions
Standard Mandarin
- Hanyu Pinyin: Dàtóng Dàxué
- Wade–Giles: Ta-t'ung Ta-hsüeh

Utopia University, known in Chinese as Datong or Tatung University, was a private university in Shanghai. It was established in March 1912 by a group of former Tsinghua faculty members led by Hu Dunfu, and became one of the most reputable private universities in China. After the founding of the People's Republic of China, the Chinese Communist Party government closed Utopia along with many other private universities in 1952. Its departments, faculty members, and students were divided and merged into various universities in Shanghai.

== Founding ==
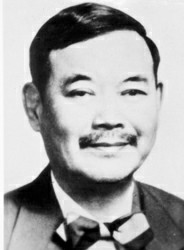
Hu Dunfu, founder and first president of Utopia

In April 1911, the American government established Tsinghua College (now Tsinghua University) in Beijing, using part of indemnity payment made by the Qing dynasty in the aftermath of the Boxer Rebellion. In summer, a group of eleven Chinese faculty members at Tsinghua, most of whom were from the Jiangnan region, established the Lida Society (立達學社) to promote education in China. Hu Dunfu was the head of the society, and other members included Ping Hailan (平海瀾), Zhu Xiangwan (朱香晚), and Gu Yangwu (顧養吾). In November 1911, the eleven members of Lida resigned from Tsinghua after having a disagreement with the American administrators at the college, and left Beijing for Shanghai. Hu Dunfu, the first dean of Tsinghua who had graduated in mathematics from Cornell University, insisted that students of Tsinghua should study more science and engineering, but American teachers, backed by the American ambassador, maintained that they should focus more on the English language and the literature, history and geography of America. They were also angered by the stark contrast in treatment between American and Chinese teachers in Tsinghua; the former were paid nearly ten times as much as the latter, so they were determined to found a university that was academically independent and truly belonged to the Chinese people.

In Shanghai, Hu Dunfu was invited by Ma Xiangbo, his former teacher at the Catholic school Collège Saint-Ignace, to be the dean of Fudan Public School (now Fudan University), which was founded by Ma in 1905. However, Hu soon left Fudan after a student strike at the school. In March 1912, Hu and his colleagues of the Lida Society founded Utopia School (大同學院) in Nanshi, Shanghai, with Hu as president. The inaugural class had 91 students.

== Republican era ==
In September 1922, Utopia School was certified by the government as a private university, and changed its name to Utopia University. It had 600 students at the time. In the 1920s, Utopia developed into one of the best private universities in China. It was divided into three schools, for literature, science, and business, which were further divided into nine departments. It also established an affiliated secondary school. The campus occupied an area of 90 mu, and had 15 buildings. A 1920s inspection report of six major private universities in Shanghai by the Chinese Ministry of Education praised Utopia and University of Shanghai as the most outstanding. Nationally, Utopia and Nankai University in Tianjin were considered the best private universities in China.

In 1937, the Second Sino-Japanese War erupted, and the Imperial Japanese Army attacked Shanghai in August. During the battle, Japanese bombing destroyed many of Utopia's buildings. After the Japanese occupied the Chinese-held areas of Shanghai, Utopia was forced to relocate to the French Concession. It moved several times between temporary accommodations, until settling down on Xinzha Road in September 1939. By this time, the university and its affiliated high school had 2,000 students. It also established another secondary school.

The university expanded further after the Second World War, becoming the largest private university in Shanghai. By 1948, it had more than 2,700 university students, and 2,500 students enrolled at its two secondary schools. It had four schools (the school of engineering had been established in addition to the original three) and fourteen departments. Among Utopia's students, 39 later became academicians of the Chinese Academy of Sciences or the Chinese Academy of Engineering.

== Demise ==
In 1949, the Chinese Communist Party (CCP) defeated the Kuomintang government in the Chinese Civil War and established the People's Republic of China. In October 1952, the new CCP government closed Utopia along with many other private universities. Its business school was merged into Shanghai University of Finance and Economics, its school of literature became part of the newly established East China Normal University, the school of science was merged into Fudan University, and the school of engineering was divided and became part of Tongji University, Shanghai Jiao Tong University, and the new East China Institute of Chemical Technology (now East China University of Science and Technology). Utopia's two affiliated secondary schools remained, and are now known as Datong High School and Wusi (May Fourth) High School.

Hu Dunfu, Utopia's founder, went to Taiwan along with the defeated Kuomintang government. He attempted to reestablish Utopia University in Taiwan, but was unsuccessful.
