= Daoxing Xia =

Chinese-American mathematician

Daoxing Xia (Chinese: 夏道行; pinyin: Xià Dàoxíng) is a Chinese American mathematician. He is professor emeritus at the Department of Mathematics, Vanderbilt University in the United States. He was elected an academician of the Chinese Academy of Sciences in 1980.

== Career ==
Xia was born on October 20, 1930, in Taizhou, Jiangsu. He pursued his undergraduate studies at the Department of Mathematics at Shandong University and subsequently obtained his postgraduate degree from the Department of Mathematics at Zhejiang University in 1952. His advisor was Chen Jiangong, a pioneer of modern Chinese mathematics who was then dean of the Department of Mathematics.

In 1952, Xia went to Fudan University in Shanghai as an assistant. In 1954 he became a lecturer and in 1956 he received a position as an associate professor. In September 1957, he was sent to Moscow State University in the USSR, where he conducted one and a half years of research with the prominent mathematician I.M. Gelfand.

In 1978, Xia obtained his professorship at Fudan University and rose to the position of vice director of the university's Mathematics Research Institute. In 1980 he was elected a member of the Chinese Academy of Sciences. He was also an adjunct professor in the Chinese Academy of Sciences Mathematical Physics Research Institute and the Department of Mathematics at Shandong University. Xia was a visiting professor of many universities and gave lectures. During the 1983–1984 academic year, Xia served as a visiting member at the Institute for Advanced Study in Princeton.

In 1984, Xia become a professor at the Department of Mathematics, Vanderbilt University. He retired in 2017.

His son, Jingbo Xia, is a professor of mathematics at SUNY Buffalo. His son-in-law, Bennett Chow, is a professor of mathematics at UC San Diego.

== Bibliography ==
- Spectral Theory of Hyponormal Operators, by Daoxing Xia, Springer Verlag (January 1984)
- Spectral Theory of Linear Operators, (with S. Yan), Press Chinese Academy of Science, Beijing (1987).
- The Second of Functional Analysis, (with S. Yan, W. Su and Y. Tong), Press Higher Education, Beijing (1986).
- An Invitation to the Theory of Linear Topological Spaces, (with Y.L. Yang), Science & Technology Press Shanghai (1986).
- Theory of a Real Variable and Functional Analysis, (with S. Yan. Z. Wu and W. Su), Press Chinese Academy of Science, Beijing, (1980).
- Measures and Integration on Infinite-dimensional spaces, Science & Technology Press Shanghai (1965), Acad. Press, New York, London (1972).
- Theory of Functions of a Real Variable and Essentials of Functional Analysis, (with S. Yan and Z. Wu), Science & Technology Press Shanghai (1956).
