= C. C. Tan =

C. C. Tan may refer to:

- Tan Jiazhen, a Chinese geneticist
- Tan Chye Cheng, a Singaporean politician
