= Datong High School =

Datong (Ta Tung) High School may refer to:

- Shanghai Datong High School
- Datong High School (Taipei)
