= Zhi-Ming Ma =

Chinese mathematician (born 1948)

- 馬志明
- Born: 1948 (age 77–78); Chengdu, Sichuan
- Citizenship: China
- Education: Chongqing Normal University, China Science and Technology University; Beijing Municipality, Chinese Academy of Sciences
- Known for: He discovered a new framework of quasi-regular Dirichlet forms which correspond to right processes in one-to-one manner.
- Scientific career
- Fields: Mathematics
- Workplaces: Chinese Academy of Sciences

Zhi-Ming Ma. (Chinese: 馬志明; pinyin: Zhi-Ming Ma) is a Chinese mathematics professor of Chinese Academy of Sciences. Ma is a former Vice Chairman of the Executive Committee for International Mathematical Union, a two times president of Chinese Mathematical Society, an elected member of World Academy of Sciences and the Chairman of Graduate Degree Committee of Academy of Math and Systems Science, Chinese Academy of Sciences.

== Biography ==
Ma was born in January, 1948 at Chengdu, Sichuan while Jiaocheng County in Shanxi Province was his native origin. He obtained his first degree in Mathematics from Chongqing Normal University in 1978. In 1981, he received his Master's degree from China Science and Technology University, Graduate School of Science Beijing Municipality. In 1984 he received his doctorate degree in Applied Mathematics from Chinese Academy of Sciences.

== Contributions ==
Ma's contribution in the theory of Dirichlet forms and Markov processes brought an end to a twenty years puzzle in the field. Ma and his team discovered a new framework of quasi-regular Dirichlet forms which correspond to right processes in one-to-one manner. His book, written in collaboration with Michael Rockner, An Introduction to the Theory of (Non-symmetric) Dirichlet Forms, has become a notable text in this field. His work on the proof of the Feynman-Kac probabilistic representation of mixed boundary problems of Schrodinger operators with measure-valued potentials is an important contribution to the theory of the Schrodinger equation.

== Selected publications ==
- Zhi-Ming Ma, M. Röckner Introduction to the theory of (non-symmetric) Dirichlet forms.1 November 1992
- Guan, QY., Ma, ZM. Reflected Symmetric α-Stable Processes and Regional Fractional Laplacian. Probab. Theory Relat. Fields 134, 649–694 (2006). https://doi.org/10.1007/s00440-005-0438-3
- Albeverio, Sergio, Ma, Zhiming Additive functionals, nowhere Radon and Kato class smooth measures associated with Dirichlet forms. https://doi.org/10.18910/8386

== Awards ==
Ma's contributions to science have led to his recognition with various awards including; the First Class Prize for Natural Sciences by the Chinese Academy of Sciences, the Max-Planck Research Award by the Max-Planck Society and Alexander von Humboldt Foundation, the Chinese National Natural Sciences Prize, the Shiing-Shen Chern Mathematics Prize, the Qiu-Shi Outstanding Young Scholars Prize, the He-Liang-He-Li Sciences and Technology Progress Prize, and the Hua Loo-Keng Mathematics Prize.

== Memberships ==
Ma is a member of different recognised scientific organisations. He was elected as an Academician of the Chinese Academy of Sciences in 1995 and he became a fellow of the Third World Academy of Sciences in 1999. He was the Chairman of the organizing committee for the International Congress of Mathematicians that was held in Beijing (2002). He was elected as a member of the Executive Committee for International Mathematical Union in 2003 and he became the Vice president in 2007. He was elected as a member of Chinese Mathematical Society and he became the president in 2003.
