= High School Attached to Zhejiang University =

Coordinates: 30°15′40.47″N 120°7′35.17″E

The High School Attached to Zhejiang University
- 浙江大学附属中学

Location
- No.89 Shuguang Road, Xihu District, Hangzhou, Zhejiang Province; China

Information
- Type: Public
- Motto: Seek for knowledge, truth, steadiness, creativeness 求知、求真、求实、求新
- Established: 1947
- Principal: Shentu Yongqing (申屠永庆)
- Website: www.hzzdfz.com

High School Attached to Zhejiang University
- Traditional Chinese: 浙江大學附屬中學
- Simplified Chinese: 浙江大学附属中学
Transcriptions
Standard Mandarin
- Hanyu Pinyin: Zhèjiāng Dàxué Fùshǔ Zhōngxué
- IPA: [ʈʂɤ̂ tɕjáŋ tâ ɕuɤ̌ fû ʂù ʈʂʊ́ŋ ɕuɤ̌]

The High School Attached to Zhejiang University (Chinese: 浙江大学附属中学; pinyin: Zhèjiāng Dàxué Fùshû Zhōngxué) is one of the first group of approved by Zhejiang Education Committee in China. It is located at 89 Shuguang Road, Xihu District, Hangzhou, Zhejiang Province.

== History ==
The High School Attached to Zhejiang University was founded in 1947 as Mingyuan Private School by Mingyuan Club members such as Feng Zikai, Pan Tianshou. In 1959 the school was placed under Zhejiang University. In 1972 it was renamed Hangzhou Fifteenth Middle School and later controlled by the Education Bureau of Hangzhou. It was renamed The High School Attached to Zhejiang University in 1992.
