= Gu Deng =

Chinese mathematician and politician

- 顧澄
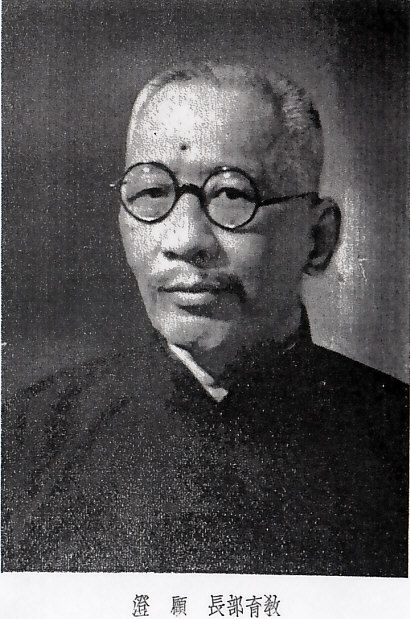
- Born: 1882; Wuxi, Jiangsu, China
- Died: 1947(?) unknown
- Education: Gezhi Academy

Gu Deng (simplified Chinese: 顾澄; traditional Chinese: 顧澄; pinyin: Gù Dèng; Wade–Giles: Ku Teng; Hepburn: Ko Cho; 1882 - 1947?) was a mathematician and politician at the end of Qing Dynasty and in the early Republic of China. His courtesy name was Yangwu (養捂).

== Biography ==
Gu Deng was born in Wuxi, Jiangsu. In the end of Qing Dynasty He graduated the department of mathematics, the Gezhi Academy (格致書院). In 1909 Gu translated the book about quaternions, this is the first introduction about quaternions in Chinese history.

Gu Deng became a teacher in Beijing University and Qinghua University, later he became the president of Beiping Women's College of Humanities and Sciences (北平女子文理學院) and the chairperson of the department of mathematics, Northeastern University. In February 1934, he became a professor of the department of mathematics at Shanghai Jiao Tong University. Gu Deng was one of the founders of the Chinese Mathematical Society, the first academic organization for Chinese mathematicians, in 1935 in Shanghai. He became the editor-in-chief of Magazine of Mathematics (數學雜志) which is published by the Chinese Mathematical Society and Information of Science (科學通訊) which is published by Shanghai Jiao Tong University.

In April 1938, Gu Deng was appointed Vice-Minister for Education under the collaborationist Provisional Government of the Republic of China led by Wang Kemin. In July, Chen Qun (陳群) was relieved from his post as Minister for Education, and Gu Deng became concurrently the provisional acting Minister as well until his official promotion to Minister for Education the following April. He remained in this post until the formation of the Reorganized National Government of China under Wang Jingwei in March 1940.

After he resignation, he lived in obscurity, and is believed to have died around 1947.
