= Zhejiang University–University of Edinburgh Institute =

Higher education school in Haining, Zhejiang, China

- 浙江大学爱丁堡大学联合学院
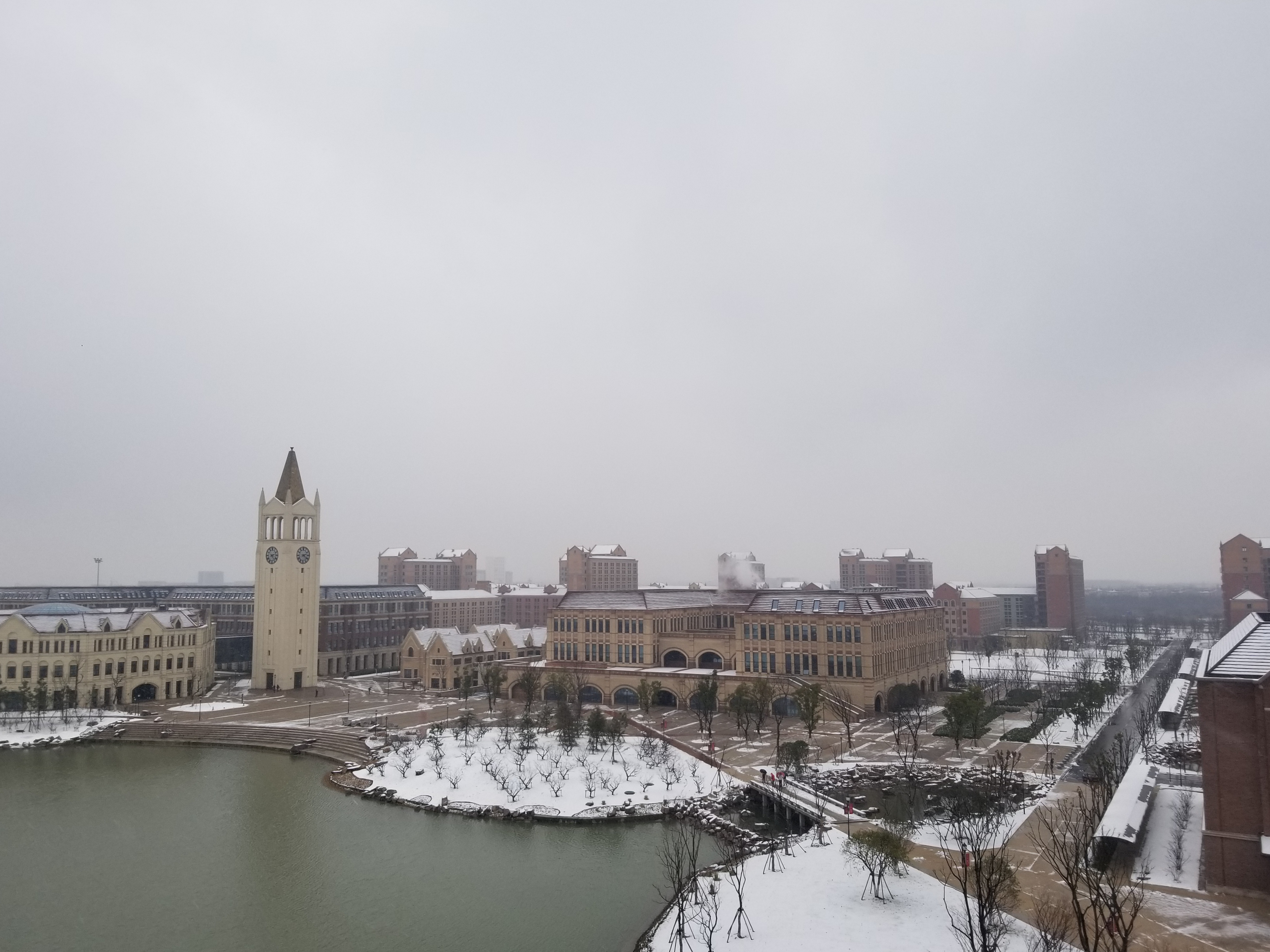
- The International Campus, Zhejiang University is where the institute is located
- Other names: ZJU–UoE Institute; Zhejiang–Edinburgh Institute; ZJE Institute
- Established: May 20, 2015; 11 years ago
- Parent institution: Zhejiang University
- Location: 718 East Haizhou Road, Haining, Zhejiang, 314400, China; 30.520833°N 120.721667°E
- Website: zje.intl.zju.edu.cn

Zhejiang University–University of Edinburgh Institute is an affiliated school of Zhejiang University, located in Haining, Zhejiang, China. The school does not have independent legal personality. It was established in 2015 under partnership with the University of Edinburgh.

Undergraduate students are awarded degrees from both universities.

== History ==
On 25 August 2011, the first joint symposium on Biomedical Sciences was held at the University of Edinburgh. The agreement to run a 3+1 degree programme was officially signed on 27 June 2012. On 28 March 2013, Zhejiang University was approved by the Ministry of Education to have the first ever programme of biomedical sciences in mainland China. On 27 March 2014, Zhejiang University and the University of Edinburgh signed a cooperative agreement to set up ZJE Institute. The official announcement of the programme was made on 20 May 2015. The International campus officially opened on 16 August 2016 costing an estimated $1 billion.

ZJE opened with its first batch of students on 11 September 2016 (2020 graduation). Professor Sue Welburn became Executive Dean on 4 March 2017.

== Campus ==
=== Location ===
This Zhejiang University-University of Edinburgh Institute is situated on the Zhejiang University Haining International Campus (海宁国际校区) in Haining, Zhejiang Province, China, under the jurisdiction of Jiaxing. Haining is in the south side of Yangtze River Delta, and in the north of Zhejiang. It is 125 kilometers west of Shanghai, and 61.5 kilometers east of Hangzhou, the capital of the province. To its south lies the Qiantang River. The city has a land area of 700.5 sq. kilometers and at the 2010 census, had a population of 806,966 inhabitants. Haining is known for its leather industry and spectacular tidal bore in the Qiantang River.

=== Facilities ===
The International Campus opened in 2016. Clusters of international cooperative partners and institutions reside on this site. The International Campus provides student and faculty accommodation, food facilities, sports centres, a hospital, a library and social facilities.

== Leadership ==
ZJE's Institute Executive leads the strategic direction and day-to-day operations of the Institute. In March 2017, Professor Sue Welburn FRSE, previous Director of the Global Health Academy at The University of Edinburgh, was appointed as the Executive Dean of ZJE.

== Academics ==
ZJE offers two undergraduate degree programmes and one postgraduate programme. These include a BSc Integrative Biomedical Sciences, Dual Degree PhD Biomedical Sciences and the upcoming BSc Biomedical Informatics. The Institute plans to expand its offering in further years.

== Student body ==
In 2016, ZJE recruited 22 domestic students from mainland China. In 2017, ZJE recruited a further 64 domestic students and 4 international students. The recruitment plan for 2018 includes 95 domestic students and 30 international, with an aim of over 600 students in future years.

== Research ==
The Zhejiang University - University of Edinburgh Institute aims to conduct world-class integrative biomedical research and development by combining the distinct and complementary strengths of both Zhejiang University and University of Edinburgh.
