= Yiwu Hospital =

Geography
- Location: 519 Nanmen St, Yiwu, Jinhua, Zhejiang, China
- Coordinates: 29.286795°N 120.082243°E

Organisation
- Type: Teaching
- Affiliated university: Zhejiang University

Services
- Beds: 800

Links
- Lists: Hospitals in China

The Fourth Affiliated Hospital of Zhejiang University School of Medicine, also called the Yiwu Hospital (Chinese: 义乌医院), is a hospital in Yiwu, Zhejiang, China. It is a teaching hospital of Zhejiang University School of Medicine.

== Introduction ==
The hospital is located in Yiwu, Zhejiang, China. The first investment of constructing this university hospital is about 1 billion yuan. Initially the hospital will have about 800 patient beds. The constructional area of the hospital is about 200 Mu.

Dr. Chen Yagang was pointed as the first president of the hospital.
