= Ocean College, Zhejiang University =

College of Zhejiang University

- 浙江大学海洋学院（舟山校区）
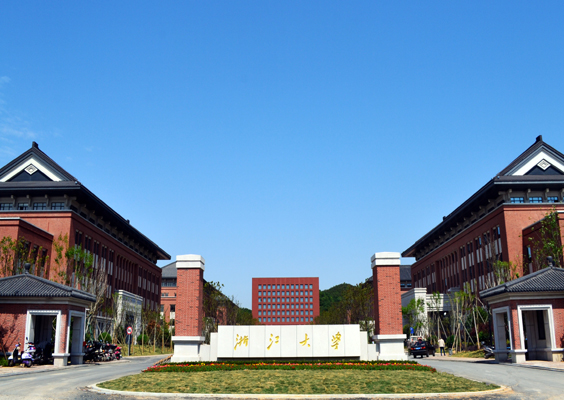
- Main gate in 2015
- Other names: Zhoushan Campus, Zhejiang University
- Established: June 2013; 13 years ago (Ocean College); September 9, 2015; 10 years ago (Zhoushan Campus)
- Parent institution: Zhejiang University
- Location: 1 Zheda Road, Dinghai District, Zhoushan, Zhejiang, 316021, China; 29.99962°N 122.16007°E
- Campus: 480 acres (190 ha)
- Website: oc.zju.edu.cn

Ocean College is a college under Faculty of Engineering of Zhejiang University (ZJU). Located on the Zhoushan Island, it was the first ZJU institution outside of Hangzhou. The college participated in several national ocean science projects, including the development of Jiaolong submersible. The college offers both undergraduate and postgraduate education, but undergraduates of the college will study at Zijingang campus for the first two years. The colleges offers courses in marine biology, oceanography, underwater technology and offshore engineering.

== History ==
Founded as the Department of Marine Science and Engineering in 2009 in a collaboration with the Municipal Government of Zhoushan, Ocean College was launched in an agreement with the local government on 10 June 2012 to serve national ocean strategies including Zhoushan Archipelago New Area. Shortly after, the construction of the Zhoushan campus began. The college was formally established in 2013 and was moved into its Zhoushan campus in September 2015. The first batch of students were enrolled in September 2015 and the campus is expected to accommodate 4,000 students by 2025.

== Campus ==
The college has a dedicated Zhoushan campus on the island of Zhoushan. The campus was the sixth campus of ZJU and is located on the seashore between Lincheng New Area and the urban area of Dinghai district. The campus came into use on 9 September 2015.

=== Architectural design ===
As the first ZJU campus outside of Hangzhou, the campus centres around the library, with the research cluster in the West and the residential cluster in the North. A sightseeing tower stands on the top of a hill in the centre of the campus. The campus buildings use the same white stone foundations and red brick exterior walls as those in Yuquan campus to represent the historic inheritance of the university.

=== Library ===
The campus has a library dedicated to ocean sciences. Most of ocean science-related books at ZJU have been stored at this library since its foundation in September 2015. The Internet on the campus is part of the Internet within Zhejiang University. Students can borrow books from the main library of Zhejiang University in Hangzhou, which mails borrowed books to Zhoushan.

=== Training ship ===
The training ship Zijingang, the first training ship owned by ZJU, is deployed at the campus. The ship is 29.8 metres long, 5.6 metres wide, with the draft of 1.3 metre. It can sail for 40 hours at its maximum speed of 15 knots.

== Institutions ==
- Ocean Academy
- Ocean Research Center of Zhoushan
  - Zhairuo Mountain Island Project
- Department of Marine Science
- Department of Ocean Engineering
- Maritime Logistics and Free Trade Islands Research Center
- ZJU-Hengyi Global Innovation Research Center (Zhoushan branch)
- Hainan Institute of Zhejiang University (in Sanya, Hainan)
