= Chinese Mathematical Society =

Chinese academic organization

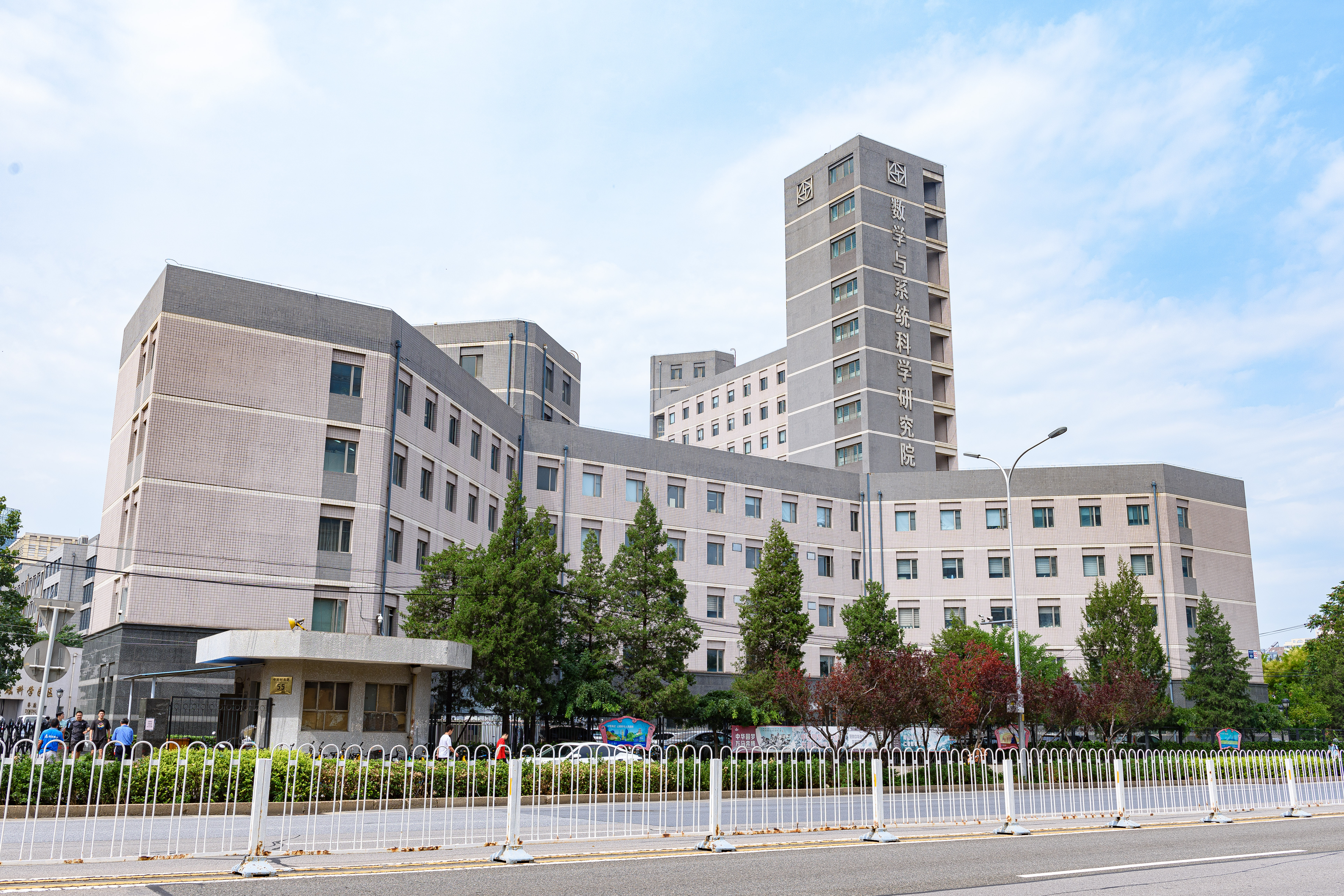
The Chinese Mathematical Society is headquartered in the Academy of Mathematics and Systems Science, Chinese Academy of Sciences

The Chinese Mathematical Society (CMS, Chinese: 中国数学会) is an academic organization for Chinese mathematicians, with the official website www.cms.org.cn. It is a member of China Association of Science and Technology.

== History ==
The Chinese Mathematical Society (CMS) was founded in July 1935 in Shanghai. The inaugural conference was held in the library of Shanghai Jiao Tong University on July 25, and 33 people attended the meeting. Its founding members included Hu Dunfu, Feng Zuxun, Zhou Meiquan, Jiang Lifu, Xiong Qinglai, Chen Jiangong, Gu Deng, Su Buqing, Jiang Zehan, Qian Baozong, and Fu Zhongsun. Hu Dunfu served as its first president. The society published Journal of Chinese Mathematical Society, and a math promoting magazine, Mathematics Magazine. In 1952 and 1953, these two journals was renamed Acta Mathematica Sinica, and Mathematics Letters.

The CMS was originally located at the China Science Society at 533 Albert Road (now South Shaanxi Road) in Shanghai. After establishment of the People's Republic of China in 1949, it was moved to the Institute of Mathematics of the Chinese Academy of Sciences in Beijing. Currently, CMS is affiliated to the Academy of Mathematics and Systems Science (AMSS) of the CAS.

In the PRC era, the Chinese Mathematical Society held its 1st to 4th national conferences in August 1951, February 1960, November 1978, and October 1983, in the cities of Beijing, Shanghai, Chengdu and Wuhan, respectively. Hua Luogeng was the president of first three conferences. In the 4th conference, Hua Luogeng, Su Buqing, Jiang Zehan, Wu Daren and Ke Zhao were elected honorary presidents. The presidents of 4th to 8th conferences were Wu Wenjun, Wang Yuan, Yang Le, Zhang Gongqing and Ma Zhi-ming, respectively.

The 50th anniversary conference of CMS was held in Shanghai in December 1985. Zhou Peiyuan and Zhou Guangzhao attended and delivered speeches. World-renowned mathematicians Shiing-shen Chern and Henri Cartan were also invited. In May 1995, the CMS 7th National Conference & 60 Anniversary Conference was held in Beijing. Zhu Guangya and Lu Yongxiang attended, and Shiing-shen Chern and Shing-Tung Yau were invited to give research talks.

The President of the 13th Council of the Chinese Mathematical Society was Gang Tian 田刚, Vice Presidents included Yuguang Shi 史宇光, and Council Members included mathematicians Jun Hu 胡俊, Chunwei Song 宋春伟 and Mingyao Ai 艾明要.

The Society has over 50,000 members.
