= 2019 Zhejiang University rapes =

Series of crimes in China

- Native name: 浙江大学强奸案
- Date: February 22, 2019
- Location: Sandu, Xihu District, Hangzhou
- Type: Rape cases
- Convicted: April 17, 2020
- Sentence: 1.5 years in jail + 1.5 years in jail with reprieve

The 2019 Zhejiang University rapes refer to a series of rapes committed by a student of Zhejiang University, one of China's most prestigious universities. The rapes came under spotlight in July 2020. Upon their exposure, the university's disciplinary action was widely criticised for being too lenient. The university eventually expelled the student on 31 July.

== Event ==
The student was an undergraduate student of civil engineering named Nuerte Bate'er (simplified Chinese: 努尔特·巴特尔; traditional Chinese: 努爾特·巴特爾), who is an ethnic Kazakh. On 17 April 2020, he was convicted of rape by the People's Court of Xihu District, Hangzhou, which sentenced him to one year and a half in jail and one year and a half in jail with reprieve. According to the criminal verdict, the student took a drunk female to a rented room in Sandun, Xihu, on 22 February 2019, kissing and touching the vagina of the female. The female fought against his behaviour and claimed to call the police, after which the student didn't continue the rape and then turned himself in to the police.

The event came to public attention when Zhejiang University announced its disciplinary action towards the student, i.e., one-year on-campus observation, on 21 July 2020. The university came under intense criticism for allowing an ethnic minority student convicted of rape to remain enrolled. Nine students came to The Beijing News, claiming that they had been sexually harassed by the student. After judiciary conviction, the student posted on WeChat Moments about his tourist travels, which made the public question whether he ever regretted, leading to wide criticism for the university's decision of being too lenient for sexual harassments. The overwhelming public opinions made the university review the case.

On 31 July, the university decided to expel the student.
