= Tan Jiazhen =

Chinese geneticist

- Traditional Chinese: 談傢楨
- Simplified Chinese: 谈家桢
Transcriptions
Standard Mandarin
- Hanyu Pinyin: Tán Jiāzhēn
- Wade–Giles: T'an Chia-chen

Tan Jiazhen (15 September 1909 – 1 November 2008), also known as C. C. Tan, was a Chinese geneticist. He was an academician of the Chinese Academy of Sciences and a foreign member of United States National Academy of Sciences. Tan was a main founder of modern Chinese genetics.

== Biography ==
Tan was born in Cixi, Ningbo, Zhejiang. His father was a local postman. From 1926 to 1930, Tan did his undergraduate study at Soochow University. In 1932, Tan received M.Sc from Yenching University. Tan continued his study in the United States and received PhD from the California Institute of Technology in 1937, under the supervision of Theodosius Dobzhansky. Thomas Hunt Morgan and Alfred Henry Sturtevant also were his professors. He later taught at Columbia University.

After Tan returned to China, he became a professor at the Department of Biology of Zhejiang University in Hangzhou. In 1952, Tan was transferred to Fudan University in Shanghai. Tan founded the first department of genetics in China at Fudan University.

"As part of the Morgan group in the 1930s, Tan helped make Drosophila pseudoobscura the leading species for evolutionary studies and did pioneering work in insect genetics. In spite of interruptions by Lysenkoism and by the Cultural Revolution, Tan was still scientifically active in China."

Tan died on 1 November 2008 of multiple organ dysfunction syndrome at the age of 99 in Shanghai.

== Main academic positions ==
- At Fudan University:
  - Founding Chair of the Department of Genetics, Fudan University
  - Director of the Research Institute of Genetics, Fudan University
  - Head of the School of Life Sciences, Fudan University
  - Vice-president of Fudan University
- Vice-president, President, Honorary-president of the Chinese Society for Genetics
- Editor-in-chief, Acta Genetica Sinica
- President, Chinese Society for Biotechnology
- Board Director, Chinese Environmental Mutagen Society
- Member of the Board, The 8th International Congress of Genetics, 1948, Sweden
- Vice-president, 15th International Congress of Genetics, 1983, India
- Vice-president, 16th International Congress of Genetics, 1988, Canada
- Vice-president, 17th International Congress of Genetics, 1993, UK
- President, 18th International Congress of Genetics, 1998, Beijing China

== Political positions ==
- Honorary president, China Democratic League

== Honors and awards ==
- Academician, Chinese Academy of Sciences, elected 1980
- Member, The Third World Academy of Sciences, elected 1985
- Foreign member, United States National Academy of Sciences, elected 1985
- Foreign member, Italian Accademia dei Quaranta, elected 1987
- Honorary member, The New York Academy of Sciences, elected 1999
- Caltech Distinguished Alumni Award
- Honorary Citizenship, California, United States
- Honorary doctorate from the York University, Canada, 1984
- Honorary doctorate from the University of Maryland, College Park, USA, 1985
- Asteroid 3542 Tanjiazhen is named after him
