= Zhejiang University =

Public university in Hangzhou, Zhejiang, China

- 浙江大学
- Other name: ZJU or Zheda
- Former names: Chekiang University (1902–1903); Chekiang Higher Institutes (1903–1914); National Third Chungshan University (1927–1928); Chekiang University (1928); National Chekiang University (1928–1950); Chekiang University (1950 – mid-1980s)
- Motto: 求是创新
- Motto in English: Seeking Truth and Pursuing Innovation
- Type: Public
- Established: as a university in 1928; 98 years ago
- Academic affiliations: C9, APRU, IAU, GUNi, YDUA, BRICS Universities League
- Budget: CN¥ 26.1 billion (2022)
- Party Secretary: Ren Shaobo
- Faculty: 4,628
- Students: 78,497 (2024)
- Undergraduates: 28,960 (2024)
- Postgraduates: 49,537 (2024)
- Location: Hangzhou, China; 30°15′49″N 120°07′15″E
- Campus: 622 hectares (1,540 acres)
- Academic term: Semester
- Colors: Blue
- Mascot: Qiushi Eagle 求是鹰
- Website: www.zju.edu.cn

Chinese name
- Simplified Chinese: 浙江大学
- Traditional Chinese: 浙江大學
- Postal: Chekiang University
Transcriptions
Standard Mandarin
- Hanyu Pinyin: Zhèjiāng Dàxué

Zhejiang University (ZJU) is a public university in Hangzhou, Zhejiang, China. It is affiliated with the Ministry of Education. The university is part of Project 211, Project 985, and Double First-Class Construction.

The university was established as National Third Chung Shan University (Note: traditional Chinese: 國立第三中山大學; simplified Chinese: 国立第三中山大学; pinyin: Guólì Dìsān Zhōngshān Dàxué; lit. 'National Third Sun Yat-sen University') in 1927, in memory of Sun Yat-sen, and soon renamed as National Chekiang University (Note: Also romanised as National Zhejiang University, abbreviated as Zhejiang University or Zheda, as Chekiang is the postal romanization of Zhejiang, which was more commonly used before mid-1980s but less frequently used since the 1990s.) (NCKU) in 1928. During the presidency of Chu Kochen from 1936 to 1949, the university retreated to Guizhou in Western China during the Second Sino-Japanese War, before it moved back to Hangzhou in 1946. After the Communist Revolution, the university was re-organized as an engineering-specialized university in 1952. In 1998, Zhejiang Medical University, Hangzhou University and Zhejiang Agricultural University, which were derived from former departments of ZJU, merged and formed the present-day ZJU as a comprehensive university.

The university maintains seven faculties with 37 colleges and schools, offering about 140 undergraduate and 300 graduate programs. The university also has seven affiliated hospitals, one museum, and two international joint institutes. Fifty-two members of ZJU faculty are also members of the Chinese Academy of Sciences or the Chinese Academy of Engineering. The university is a member of the C9 League.

Zhejiang University was ranked first worldwide among academic institutions for scientific research output by the Nature Index in 2026 and the CWTS Leiden Ranking Traditional Edition in 2025. Notable alumni of the university include Chinese premier Li Qiang, entrepreneurs Duan Yongping and Colin Huang, and DeepSeek founder Liang Wenfeng.

== History ==
=== 1897–1914: college-preparatory school ===
Established in 1897 by Hangzhou's mayor, Lin Qi, Qiushi Academy was the major predecessor to the university. The educational reforms of 1902 and 1904 in China led to the academy being renamed Chekiang University in 1902, and subsequently Chekiang Higher Institute in 1903. Elmer L. Mattox of Hangchow Presbyterian College was appointed as the head teacher of the college, responsible for supervising and organising teaching. The Institute was the first provincial educational institution to send students to study abroad.

However, the proposed reforms under the new republican government following the 1911 revolution sparked controversy, causing the Institutes to cease student recruitment in 1912 and ultimately close in 1914.

In 1947, Chang Ch'i-yun, a professor at NCKU, began attributing the university's origin to the Qiushi Academy, which was later acknowledge in the yearbook of the Ministry of Education of the Republic of China.

=== 1928–1949: national university ===
After the closure of Cheking Higher Institute, the attempts to restore the institute was unsuccessful due to conflicts between warlords. After the Northern Expedition in July 1927, the Kuomintang (KMT) took control of Hangzhou and established the National Third Chungshan University, by merging Chekiang Industrial College and Chekiang Agricultural College on the original site of Qiushi Academy. On April 1, 1928, the institution was renamed Chekiang University, and later that year it was renamed National Chekiang University (NCKU), with Jiang Menglin, an alumnus and teacher of Qiushi, as its first president.

In 1929, Jiang was succeeded by Shao Peizi, also an alumnus and teacher of Qiushi. Shao refused to join KMT, which led to a tense relationship between the university and the government, and the government withdrew funding in 1932, leading to Shao's resignation. Cheng Tien-fong, a member of the KMT, was then appointed by the Nationalist government as the new president. Under his leadership, with the personal intervention of Chiang Kai-shek, the university began to receive direct funding from the central government.

In March 1933, Kuo Zing-Yang, another KMT member, became president. But as the Sino-Japanese conflict intensified and the Nationalist government's response to the invasion was perceived as lenient, its popularity waned. This discontent culminated in the December 9 Movement of 1935, when students ousted Kuo from office, accusing him of collaborating with the police to arrest student demonstrators.

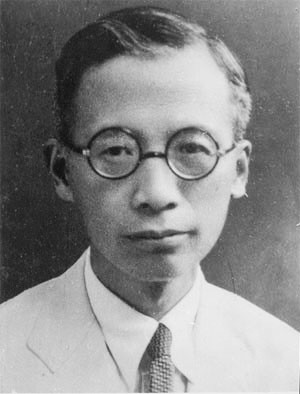
Chu Kochen, president of National Chekiang University from 1936–1949

Chu Kochen, a scholar with no previous political appointments, was recommended to Chiang Kai-shek by Chen Bulei for the presidency of NCKU in April 1936. Kochen's inauguration was presided over by Jiang Menglin. Backed by Chen Bulei's strong financial backing and authority to make political appointments within the university, Chu was able to attract leading members of the Science Society of China and the Critical Review Group. In the second half of 1937, with the outbreak of the Second Sino-Japanese War and the advance of the Japanese army, the university was forced to move from Hangzhou, first to Yishan, then to Zunyi, and finally to Meitan in Guizhou Province in southwest China. During this period, the students of NCKU took on the responsibility of safeguarding Zhejiang's historical collections, including the Complete Library of the Four Treasuries housed in the Wenlan Pavilion, to prevent their capture by Japanese forces.

In March 1945, Fei Gong, an NCKU professor and critic of the Nationalist government, disappeared in Chongqing in what was later proved to be a government assassination. In September, with the surrender of Japan, a group of NCKU professors led by Luo Zongluo were ordered by the government to take over the Japanese Imperial University in Taiwan. In October, the students and faculty who had retreated to Longquan began to return to Hangzhou, while those who had retreated to Guizhou returned in May 1946 with the help of the United Nations Relief and Rehabilitation Administration. The university set up its first medical school on the instructions of the Ministry of Education.

In late 1947, the death of Yu Zisan, the president of the university's student union, led to strikes and protests. While Chu attempted to strike a balance between his students and the Nationalist government, his relationship with the students worsened and he moved to Shanghai, upon the request of the Nationalist government. But he eventually did not move to Taiwan and secretly stayed at the Academia Sinica building in Shanghai, until the Communist takeover of the NCKU campus in May 1949.

=== 1949–1976: Mao Zedong era ===
In August 1948, Ma Yinchu was appointed as the university president, who promoted communist education and organisations within the university. In 1950, the new Ministry of Education instructed all universities to remove "National" from their names. Hence the university's name was changed to its present name in Chinese, or Zhejiang University (ZJU). The communist education among faculty evolved into the Thought Reform and Three-anti and Five-anti Campaigns after Ma was appointed the president of Peking University in 1949. ZJU scholars such as Su Buqing, Tan Jiazhen, Wang Guosong became targets of political prosecution.

In the early 1950s, the university underwent a series of re-organisation, which aimed to establish a Soviet-styled education system, to eventually became an engineering-focused university., which only had the departments of electrical engineering, chemical engineering, civil engineering and mechanical engineering. The engineering school of Hangchow University merged into ZJU. The university's College of Agriculture became an independent university, named Zhejiang Agricultural University. The university's medical school merged into Zhejiang Provincial Medical College to become Zhejiang Medical College. The departments of Chinese Literature, Foreign Literature and Education was merged into Zhejiang Teachers College and relocated to the campus of Hangchow University. The faculty of College of Sciences were sent to Chinese Academy of Sciences.

In 1954, the university moved from Daxue Road to Yuquan. Liu Dan, the university's Party Secretary, restored sciences research and education as part of the university's engineering offerings. In 1963, ZJU was selected as one of the National Key Universities.

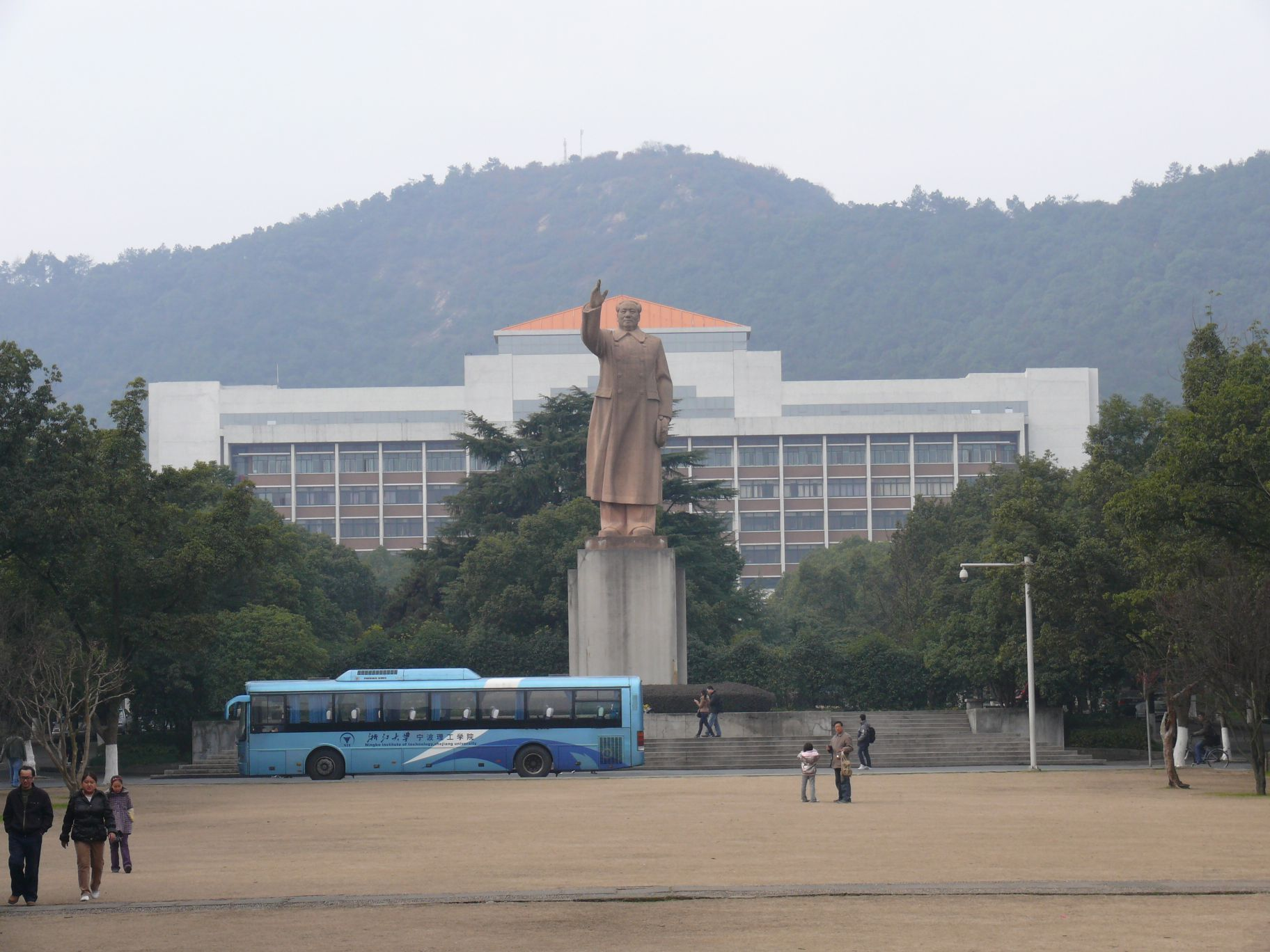
A statue of Mao Zedong was set up at the Zhejiang University campus on December 26, 1969 as a result of Mao Zedong's cult of personality during the Cultural Revolution. The statue remains a major landmark at Yuquan Campus.

In 1966, the Cultural Revolution broke out and the university ceased to function. Liu Dan was removed from office after being attacked by the Zhejiang Daily and the People's Daily. There was an emergence of radical groups in favour of Cultural Revolution. In August, the ZJU students confronted with younger red guards, who were mostly high school students, to protect Lingyin Temple from their attempts to destroy Four Olds. In 1967, at a meeting with Tan Zhenlin in Beijing, red guards from ZJU were told that Mao Zedong wanted to protect Jiang Hua in this revolution. This led to a split within red guards in Zhejiang, particularly with another faction led by Zhang Yongsheng from the Chinese Academy of Art, who wanted to persecute Jiang Hua. The two factions fought each other constantly throughout the Cultural Revolution.

=== 1976 to present ===
With the end of the Cultural Revolution in 1976, Liu returned to ZJU as the honorary president, the only by far. In November 1980, ZJU became co-funded by both Ministry of Education and Zhejiang's provincial government.

In 1989, Zhejiang University students, along with more than 10 other universities in Hangzhou, demonstrated in Wulin Square in support of the democracy movement in Beijing. After hearing of the massacre in Beijing, the student protesters blocked the railway at Nanxingqiao station with their bodies for three days before negotiating with the vice-governor, Chai Songyue. At least 60 passenger trains and 166 freight trains were blocked during the protest.

Since 1988 to 1995, Lu Yongxiang assumed the president of Zhejiang University, during which he made "pursuing innovation" part of the university motto and reformed teaching and research systems, including introduction of the program of Advanced Honor Class of Engineering Education.

In 1995, it was selected into Project 211. In 1997, Wang Ganchang and Bei Shizhang in Beijing, and Su Buqing and Tan Jiazhen in Shanghai, wrote a joint letter to the then General Secretary of the Chinese Communist Party, Jiang Zemin, recommending a merger of the four universities. In 1998, with the approval of the State Council, the new Zhejiang University was established as a merger of four major universities. With over 30,000 students and 10,000 staff, the new Zhejiang University was considered the largest higher education institution in Asia. Zhang Junsheng was appointed Party secretary of the university to oversee the merger. In 2005, the university founded Zhejiang University Holding Group, later renamed as Zhejiang University Yuanzheng Holding Group. As of 2022, there are several companies affiliated to the group have been publicly listed, including Insigma Technology, United Mechanical & Electrical, and Shenghua Land. In October 2005, the university's Hubin campus was sold at the price of 2.46 billion Chinese yuan to Kerry Properties for commercial complex development. In June 2012, Zhejiang University founded the Ocean College in collaboration with Zhoushan municipal government. In December 2014, the university signed an agreement with the University of Edinburgh to form a joint institute at the Haining campus. In July 2015, another agreement to build a joint institute was signed with the University of Illinois at Urbana-Champaign. In September 2016, the new Haining campus came into use.

In April 2013, 53 alumni co-signed a petition against the appointment of Lin Jianhua as Zhejiang University's new president. An open letter by the alumni says, "Zhejiang University needs an upright and capable academic leader, not a mediocre chief executive." In November 2013, Chu Jian, vice president of the university who was rumoured to be behind the rare petition, was arrested for bribery, yet he was not tried until 2017 and was soon released after he was sentenced to 3 years in jail which had almost been fulfilled by the time of trial.

In September 2013, amid extensive objection from local residents and university alumni, part of Huajiachi campus was sold at the price of 13.67 billion Chinese yuan, making the land the most expensive in the city's history.

In July 2020, the university came under intense criticism for allowing an ethnic minority student convicted of rape to remain enrolled. The public questioned whether the university's decision was too lenient for sexual harassments. The overwhelming public opinions made the university review the case, and eventually expelled the student.

In November 2020, the university founded its new Ningbo campus. In 2019, the Institute of Hainan were founded in Sanya, Hainan. In 2021, new institutes were founded in Quzhou, Jinhua, Wenzhou, Jiaxing, Huzhou, Shaoxing and Taizhou within Zhejiang. In March 2021, tech tycoon Colin Huang donated $100 million to support the university's Shanghai Institute for Advanced Study.

== Campuses ==
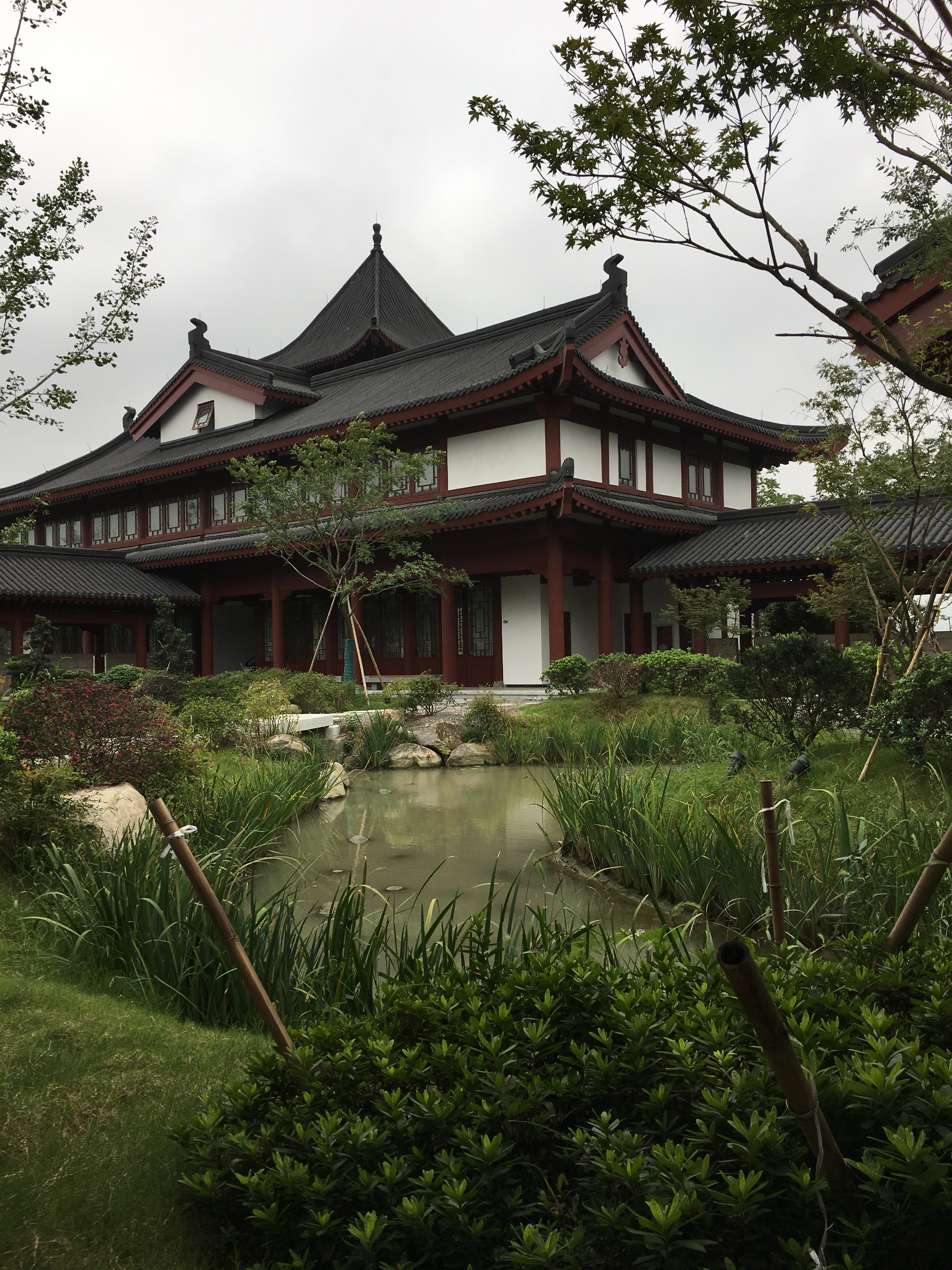
A replica of Qiushi Academy within the Zijingang Campus; Qiushi, or 'seeking truth' is the motto of the university

=== Current campuses ===
With seven campuses, namely Zijingang, Yuquan, Xixi, Huajiachi, Zhijiang, Zhoushan, International campus in Haining and Ningbo, Zhejiang University encompasses an area of 6.22 square kilometers with school buildings covering 3.67 million square meters of floor space.

==== Zijingang Campus ====
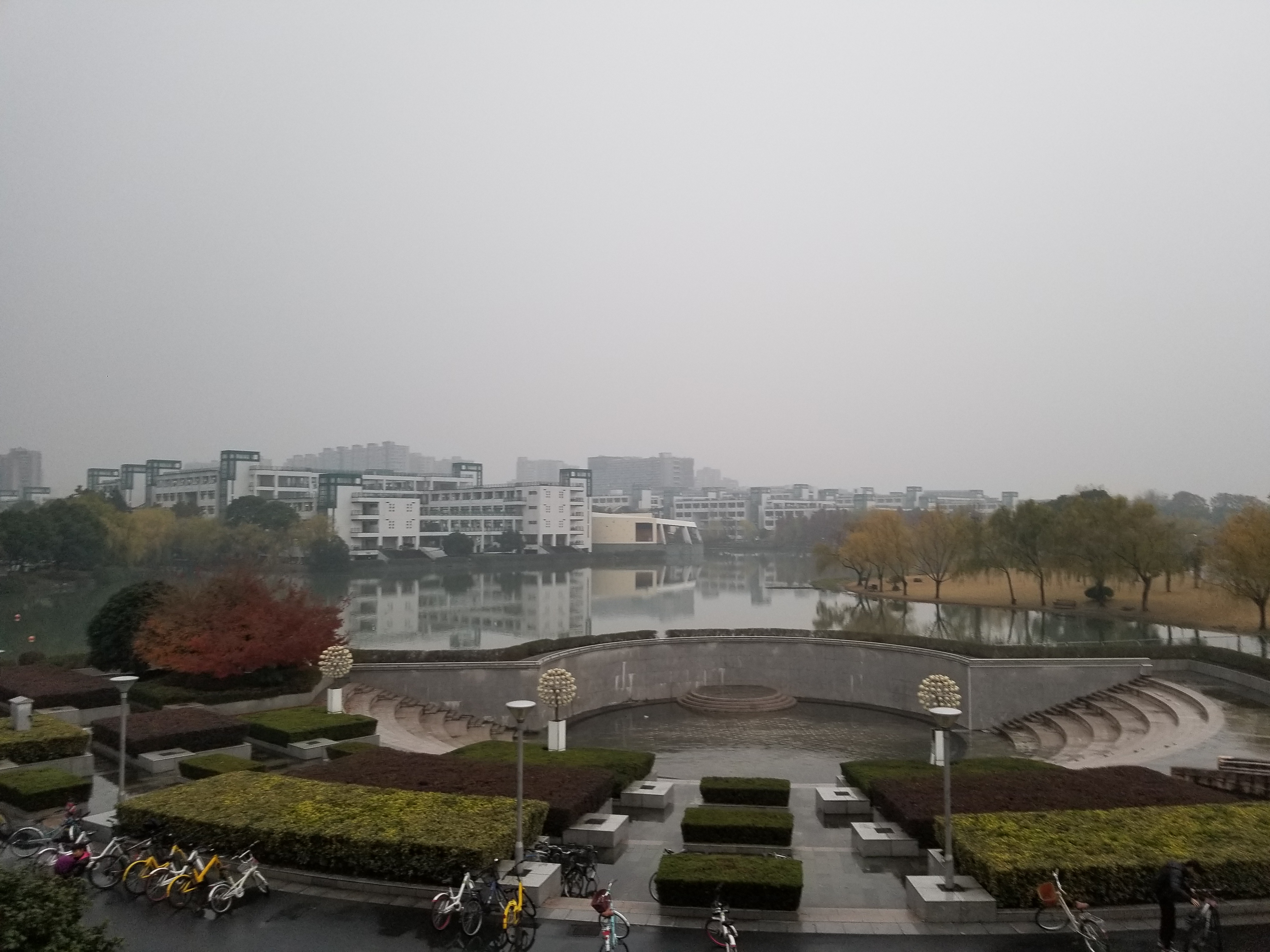
Zijingang Campus, the main campus of ZJU, which came into use in 2002

Zijingang campus serves as the main campus of Zhejiang University and is located in the northwest of Hangzhou. There are two libraries in the campus, i.e. the Basic Library next to the east gate and the Library of Agriculture and Medicine in the southeast corner and Library of Ancient Books in the south of the campus. The first floor of the Basic Library is an English corner every Tuesday and Thursday night. The campus is served by Sanba Station and Xialongwei Station of the Hangzhou Metro to the east of the campus and Zijingang Campus Zhejiang University Station on the south side.

The South Gate of the campus is linked to the Zijingang Campus Zhejiang University station with bridges over the Yuhangtang River, which were opened in February 2022. The gigantic, five-arched South Gate was built with donations from alumni, but widely regarded unfit for the purpose among ZJU students. In a public poll in 2021, the South Gate was voted as the ugliest building in China.

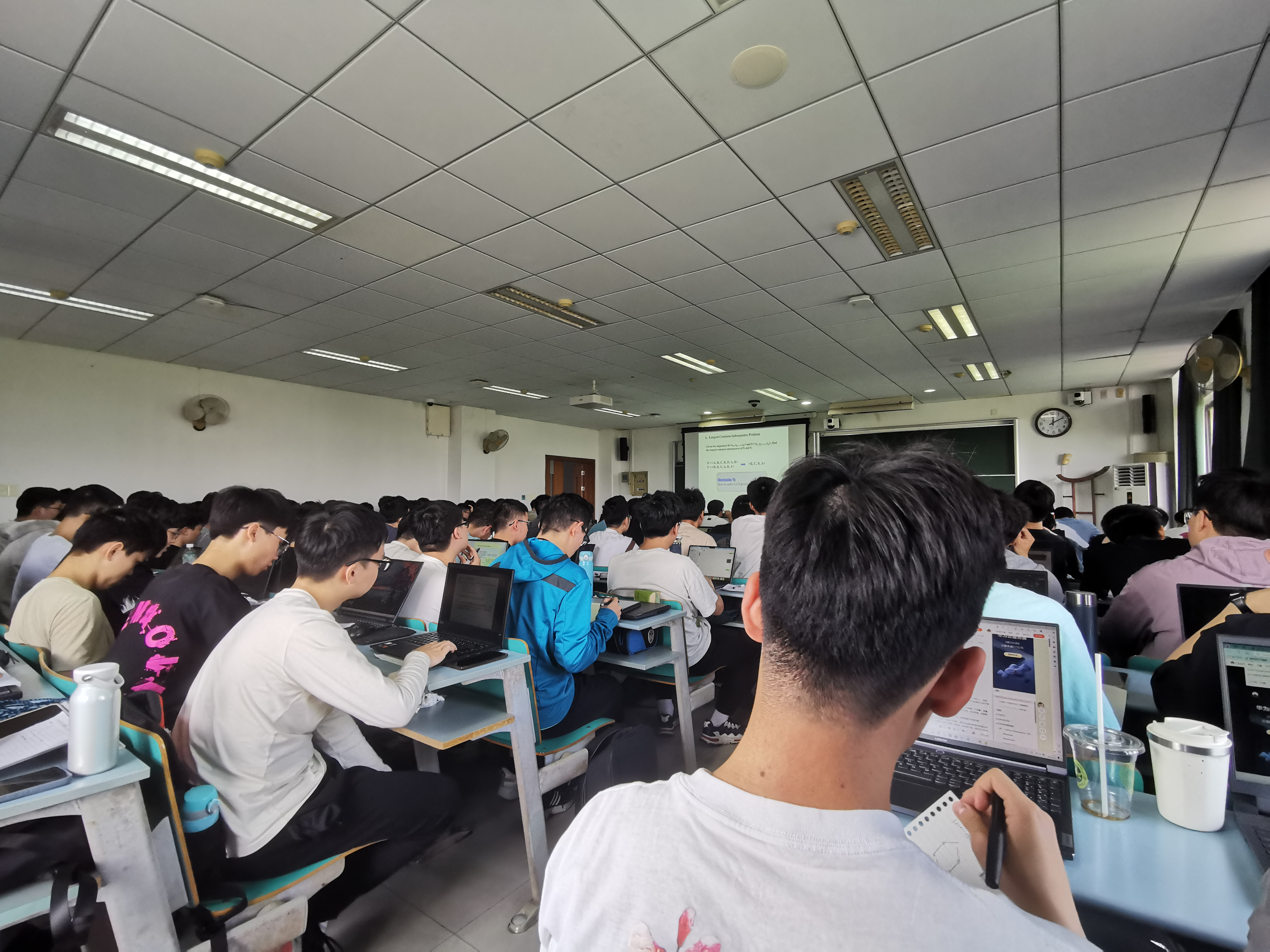
Students in a classroom at the West Teaching Area in the Zijingang Campus of ZJU

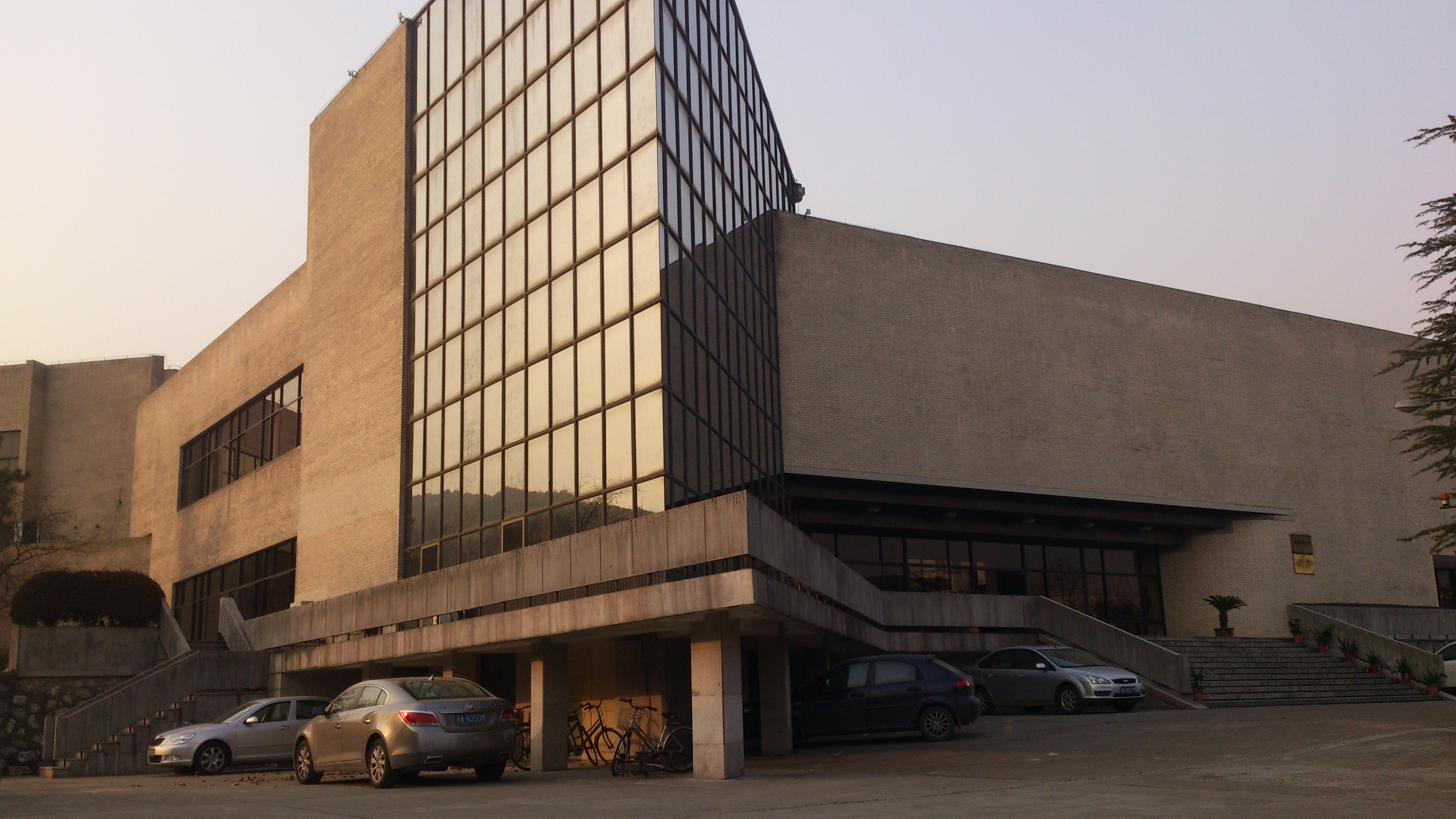
Shaw Science Hall at Yuquan Campus, the first donation of Sir Run Run Shaw in mainland China

==== Yuquan Campus ====
Zheda Road that stretches from the main gate of the campus to the High School Attached to Zhejiang University was known for its road greening landscape design. Alongside the road is a compound named Zheda Qiushi Village, also known as Qiushi Village, which was the residential area for Zhejiang University faculty and their family. Qiushi Primary School, also known as the Primary School Attached to Zhejiang University, and Hangzhou No. 15 Middle School, also known as the Junior High School Attached to Zhejiang University, are located near the compound. The Yuquan 1897 cafe within the campus is an English corner every Wednesday evening.

==== Xixi Campus ====
Xixi campus was previously the site of the former Hangzhou University before it merged into Zhejiang University in 1998. The campus hosts Department of Psychology and Behavioral Sciences, School of Art and Archaeology, and Zhejiang University Press. The library is located in the Center of campus. Between the library and the south gate of the campus is a large meadow. The campus is next to Xuejun High School. Xuejun used to be the affiliated high school of Hangzhou University, and is among top two high schools in Hangzhou, hence a major source of students admitted into Zhejiang University. Due to the location, the university canteen at Xixi was often overloaded with high school students.

==== Huajiachi Campus ====
The Huajiachi campus was previously Zhejiang Agricultural University before merging with Zhejiang University and served as the old Huajiachi Campus for the National Chekiang University before the early 1950s. The campus is home to the departments of dentistry and agriculture, plus the College of Continuing Education. The Huajiachi campus is Zhejiang University's oldest campus. The Huajiachi initially refers to a lake within the campus, hence the name of the campus. The library is located on the east shore of the Huajiachi. The university made a plan to move out from the campus in 2007. As part of the plan, one fourth of the campus had been sold in 2013. In the plan, the campus will be transformed into a lakeside park that reserves most of the campus' old buildings.

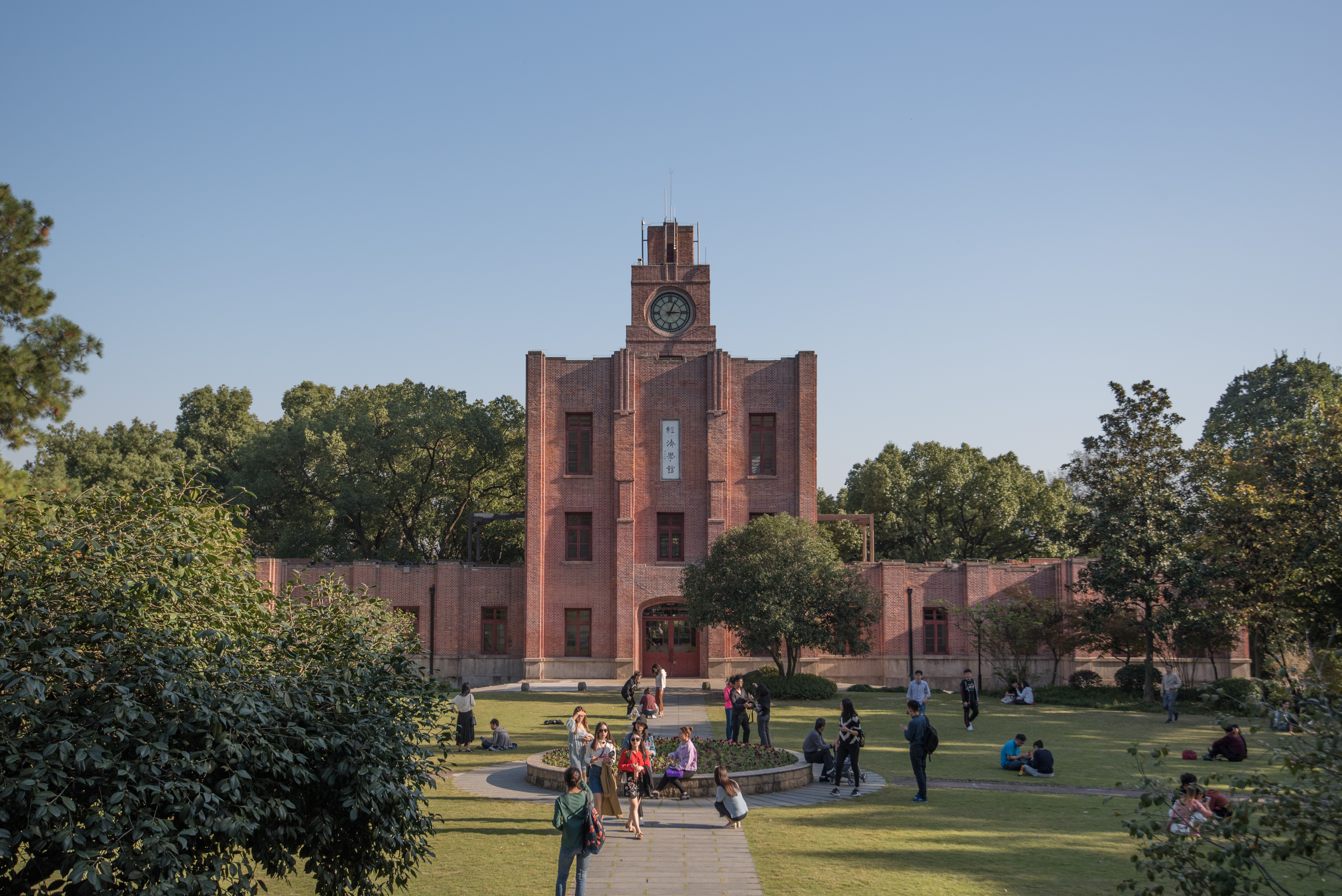
The Bell Tower of Zhijiang Campus was donated by Shi Liangcai, whose son studied at the campus in the 1930s. The building is now home to the Institute for Advanced Study in Humanities and Social Sciences.

==== Zhijiang Campus ====
The Zhijiang campus (simplified Chinese: 之江校区; traditional Chinese: 之江校區) is home to Guanghua Law School. Before being acquired by Zhejiang University in 1952, the Zhijiang campus served as the main campus of Hangchow University, and is located on the Yuelun Hill next to the Qiantang River and the Liuhe Pagoda. The campus is now home to James D. Watson Institute of Genome Sciences, Guanghua Law School and the Institute for Advanced Study in Humanities and Social Sciences. The Library of Guanghua Law School is located to the north of the Main Teaching Building. Several buildings in the campus are listed as the Major Historical and Cultural Sites Protected at the National Level. The 2010 movie Aftershock made the campus a popular tourist destination within the city, as the movie was shot on location within the campus to mimic a Chinese university life in the 1980s.

Location of ZJU satellite campuses in Zhejiang

==== Zhoushan Campus ====
Zhoushan campus (simplified Chinese: 舟山校区; traditional Chinese: 舟山校區) is a campus that opened in 2015 and serves as the campus for the Ocean College. It is located in Lincheng, Dinghai District, Zhoushan City on the Zhoushan Island. The Library of the Ocean College is located in the north of the campus. Between the library and the south gate is a meadow. The university's only training ship, named Zijingang, is deployed at the campus. Only third-year and fourth-year undergraduate students of the Ocean College and postgraduate students studied at the campus, while first-year and second-year students of the college receive education at Zijingang before moving to the campus in their third year.

==== Haining International Campus ====
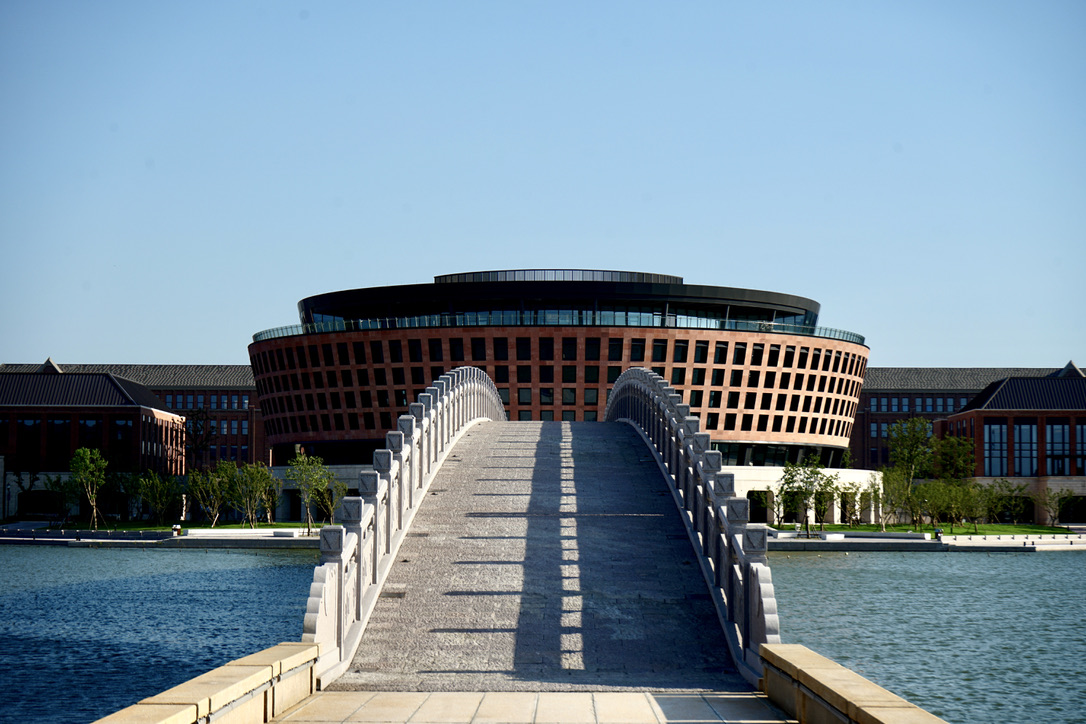
Qiushi Auditorium at the Center of Haining Campus

Haining International Campus (海宁国际校区) is located in the Zhejiang city of Haining. Clusters of international cooperative partners and institutions reside at this campus, which opened in 2016 as part of Zhejiang University. Student studying at the campus are also enrolled in the residential college. The first master of the college is Professor Lap-Chee Tsui. The International Campus Library is a three-storey octagonal building located on the northeast shore of the central lake of the campus. The campus is served by International Campus, ZJU station of Hangzhou–Haining intercity railway, which opened on June 28, 2021.

Zhejiang University International Business School (ZIBS), the Zhejiang University-University of Edinburgh Institute (ZJE), the Zhejiang University–University of Illinois at Urbana-Champaign Institute (ZJUI) and the Imperial College-Zhejiang University Joint Applied Data Science Lab are located within the campus.

==== Ningbo Campus ====
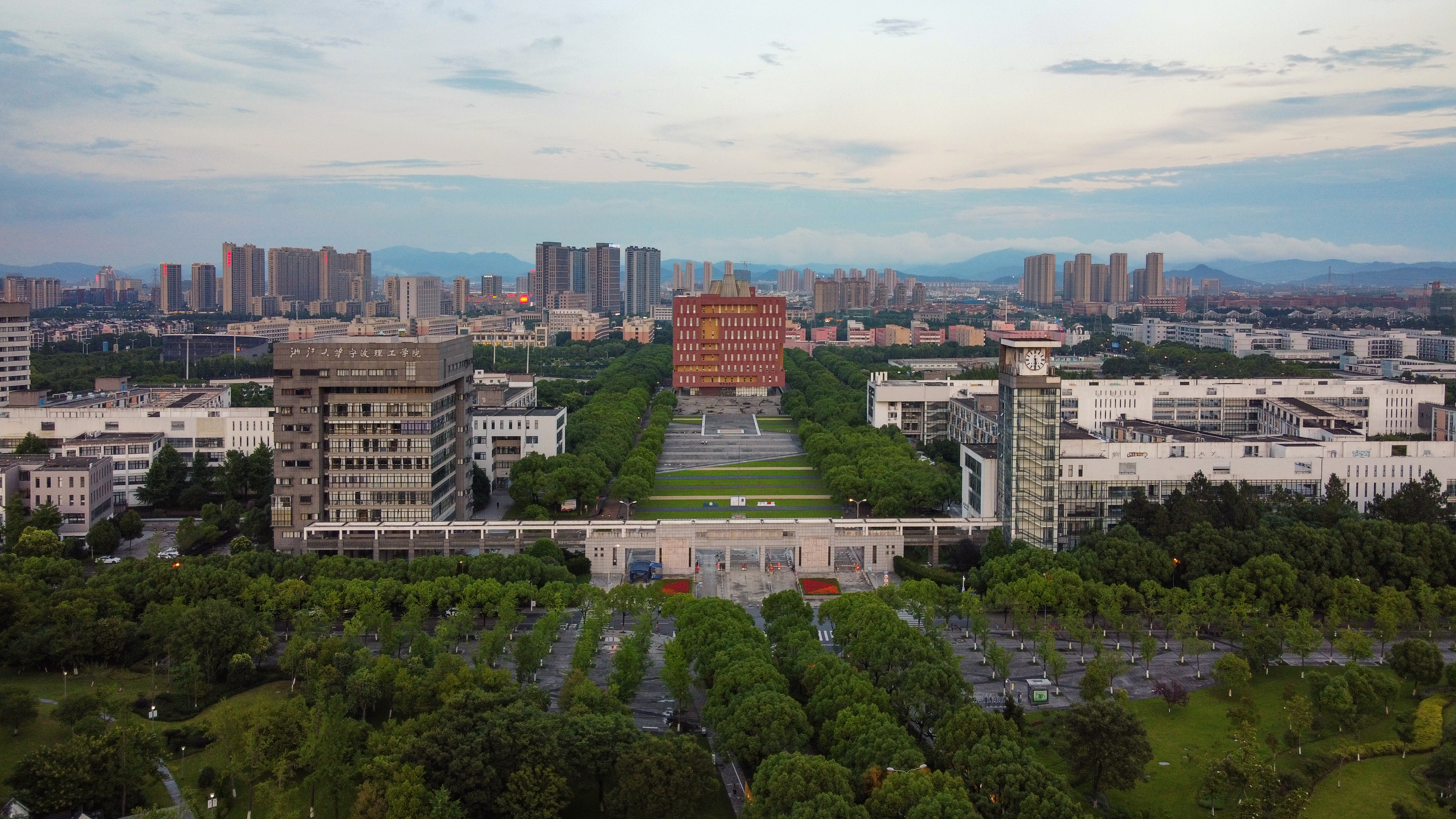
The campus of NingboTech as well as ZJU's Ningbo Campus

The Ningbo campus was initiated as a collaboration with Ningbo city government in September 2017, with the campus' administration founded in September 2019. It was based on the campus of the former Ningbo Institute of Technology (NIT) of Zhejiang University (now NingboTech University). Zhejiang University library has not set up a branch library in the campus, yet its resources are available at NingboTech's library. The campus is served by South Higher Education Park Station of Ningbo Rail Transit. The Polytechnic Institute of Zhejiang University started a branch in the campus since October 2016. Later, the Institute of Ningbo was founded in June 2018 within the campus of Ningbo Institute of Technology (NIT), Zhejiang University. In January 2020, the NIT was made independent from Zhejiang University and renamed as NingboTech University, but remains in the campus. The campus is also home to the School of Software Technology, Zhejiang University.

=== Off-campus research Centers ===
The university also has several research institutes off its campuses within Zhejiang, which include the Innovation Institute for Artificial Intelligence in Medicine, Zhejiang University Innovation Institute International, Innovative Institute of Basic Medical Sciences of Zhejiang University in Hangzhou, the Institute of Wenzhou, Research Institute of Zhejiang University – Taizhou, Institute of Quzhou, Institute of Jinhua, Institute of Huzhou, International Institutes of Medicine in Yiwu, the Institute of Shaoxing, and the Ocean Research Center of Zhoushan.

The institutes and research Centers outside the province include the Institute of State System Research (Beijing Research Center), Shanghai Institute for Advanced Study, Hainan Institute of Zhejiang University, the Institute of Shenzhen, Suzhou Industrial Technology Research Institute, and Changzhou Industrial Technology Research Institute, and Zhongyuan Institute in Zhengzhou.

=== Historical and proposed campuses ===
==== Wartime Campuses ====
Wartime campuses from 1937 to 1946
1 Huajiachi Campus, Hangzhou, Zhejiang Province (original campus)
2 Chanyuan Temple, Tianmu Mountain, Zhejiang Province (September – November 1937)
3 Jiande County, Zhejiang Province (November – December 1937)
4 Qingyuan Mountain, Ji'an County, Jiangxi Province (January – February 1938)
5 Dayuan College, Taihe County, Jiangxi Province (February – September 1938)
6 Yishan County, Guangxi Province (October 1938 – January 1940)
7 Fangye Village, Longquan County, Zhejiang Province (June 1939 – June 1946)
8 Meitan County, Guizhou Province (November 1939 – June 1946)
9 Zunyi City, Guizhou Province (January 1940 – June 1946)
10 Yongxing Town, Meitan County, Guizhou Province (February 1940 – June 1946)

During the Second World War, the university left its campus in Hangzhou to evade Japanese invasion. During the wartime relocation, the university also temporarily used the campuses in Jiande in 1937, Ji'an, Taihe Yishan in 1938, before it finally arrived in Meitan and Zunyi, Guizhou in southwest China in early 1940. The university operated there for seven years until the war ended. In June 1939, the university set up a satellite campus headed by Zheng Xiaocang in Longquan, Zhejiang.

In 2016, Dr. Ye Yongfei of the central committee of the Revolutionary Committee of the Chinese Kuomintang suggest that the university restore the Meitan campus to support economic development in western China, which was echoed by the local government of Zunyi who set up a committee to gather support in 2018. In March 2018, the university responded that it had no substantial plan to restore the Meitan campus.

==== Former Hubin Campus ====
The university had a Hubin campus, which was the former site of Zhejiang Medical University. Most of the campus was demolished in January 2007 and turned into the Kerry Center, a modern commercial complex connected with Fengqi Road station of Hangzhou Metro, except for the former site of the High Court of Zhejiang and the Local Court of Hang County reserved as Hangzhou Urban Construction Exhibition Hall.

== University identity and culture ==
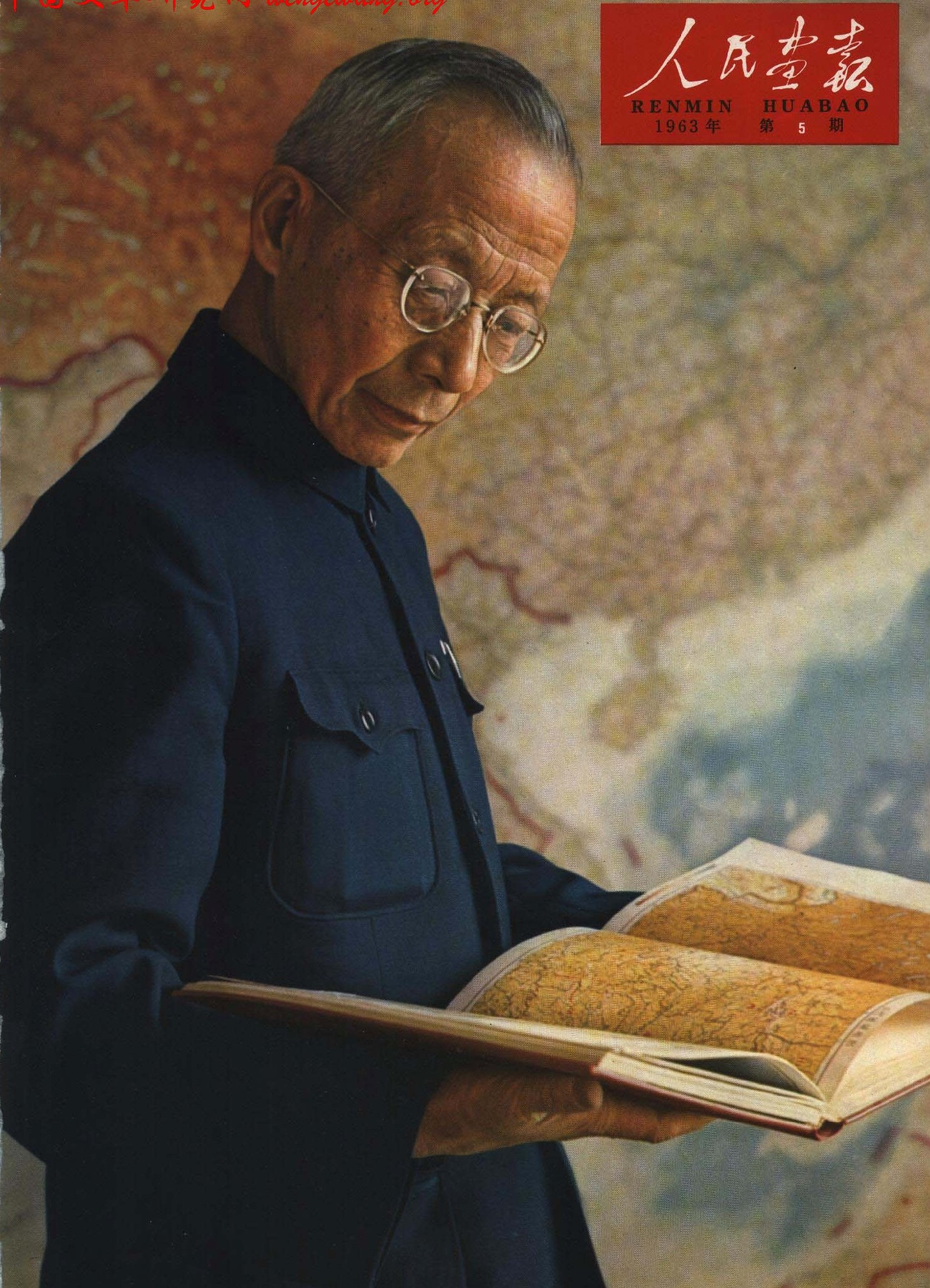
Chu Kochen is regarded as the greatest president of Zhejiang University, who served the role during 1936–1949

=== Motto ===
During the University Council meeting held in Yishan, Guangxi on November 19, 1938, "seeking truth" (Chinese: 求是; pinyin: Qiúshì) was made the motto of the university, upon President Chu Kochen's advice. Qiushi is an excerpt of the famous quote in Yangmingism, "A Gentleman learns only to know what is right. (Chinese: 君子之學，唯求其是)" It was made the name of the former body Qiushi Academy in 1897, which means seeking truth and has the same pronunciation as truth in English. According to Chu,

Seeking truth is not limited to studying hard or doing experiments in the lab. As Doctrine of the Mean says, seeking truth is 'to study extensively, inquire prudently, think carefully, distinguish clearly, and practice earnestly.'

In May 1988, "pursuing innovation" was added to the university motto by the university council, to adapt the motto to the times of the reform and opening up. President Lu Yongxiang explained in 1992,

Strictly speaking, pursuing innovation is included in seeking truth, [...] but people often regard seeking truth as being practical, emphasising the acknowledgement and application of the existing body of knowledge and the objective analysis and knowledge of the reality, with no emphasis on being creative and innovative.

=== Anthem ===
External videos
- Zhejiang University Anthem

During November 19, 1938 university council meeting, the neo-Confucianism scholar Ma Yifu, who was teaching at Chekiang was invited by President Chu to be the lyric writer of the university anthem, upon Chu's advice. However, as the lyric by Ma was written in Classical Chinese and thus difficult-to-understand, the anthem wasn't composed until Professor Ying Shangneng at National Conservatory of Music was invited to compose the anthem in the summer of 1941. In 2014, the Zhejiang University Anthem was ranked the most popular university anthem, according to an online survey by the news office of the Ministry of Education.

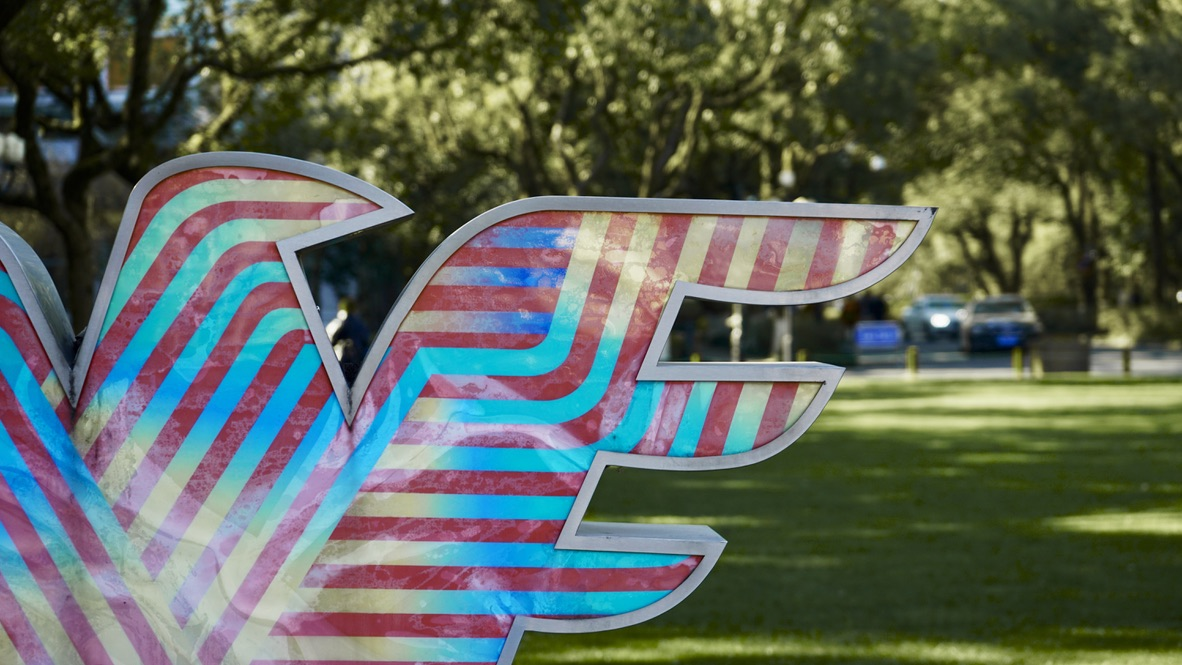
An installation art work of Qiushi eagle for 120th Anniversary of Zhejiang University at Yuquan Campus in 2017

=== Mascot, logo and flag ===
Seal of National Chekiang University (1920s and 1930s)

Logo of Zhejiang University (since 1991)

The university's mascot is Qiushi eagle, which was first portrayed within its seal used by National Chekiang University during the 1920s and 1930s and then reintroduced in the 1990 logo of Zhejiang University. The Qiushi eagle also appears in the logos of NingboTech University and Zhejiang University City College, which was formerly affiliated institutions of Zhejiang University turned independent in December 2019.

The current logo of Zhejiang University was introduced by the university council meeting in January 1991. The logo was officially digitized in May 2017. The Chinese character calligraphy in the logo is taken from Mao Zedong's writing. A combination of the calligraphy and logo in red or blue if using a blank flag or in white if using a blue or red flag is used as the flags of the university.

=== Quotes of Chu Kochen ===
Chu Kochen, who served as the president of National Chekiang University from 1936 to 1949, is credited with a major impact on the guiding spirit of Zhejiang University. His two open questions for the freshmen who enrolled in 1936 has been inscribed in the stone next to the main gate of the Zijingang Campus as well as multiple sites within the university, which says,

You have two questions to ask yourself: First, what do you want to do at Zheda? Second, when you graduate, what kind of people do you want to be?

In another quote that is often displayed in the campus, Chu Kochen talks about the aim of university education, where he says,

The aim of university education is not to nurture experts such as engineers and doctors, but to build leaders that are just, patriotic, fortitudinous and persistent, that take major roles, that lead trends, and that change the destiny of this nation.

== Administration and organization ==
=== Governance ===
The university is organized according to Zhejiang University Chapter approved by the Ministry of Education of the People's Republic of China. The current chapter was approved in September 2014. According to the chapter, the university is a national university managed by the Ministry of Education and jointly funded by the central government and Zhejiang government. The university is operated by the Communist Party Committee of the university with the president taking the responsibility of decision making. The committee is required to ensure rule of law, academic freedom and democracy at the university. Since 2000, the president and party secretary of the university are appointed by the Organization Department of the Chinese Communist Party, and the appointees are automatically considered as vice-ministerial level officials. The party committee elects the members of the standing committee, which decide major issues at the university jointly with the party committee. The president hosts university council meeting to decide on teaching and learning, scientific research and administrative issues. The faculty can review and advise on university decisions via the faculty representative meeting. The current party secretary of the university is Dr. Ren Shaobo. The president of the university is Professor Dr. Du Jiangfeng.

=== Administrative departments ===
In the university has an administrative system that consists of 17 administrative departments. Among them, the Office of the Presidents set the strategic priorities for the university to maintain the university's leading position, while the Development and Planning Office is in charge of planning for the implementation of the strategic priorities. The Office of Global Engagement and the Division of Domestic Relations are responsible for implementing the university's strategy and promoting the university domestically and globally. The Human Resources Department recruits and provides services for the faculty, while the Undergraduate School and the Graduate School organise and supervise teaching, learning and degree awarding. The Administration of Continuing Education further provides training and supervision for continuing education programs. The research and development programs are supervised by the Sci-Tech Academy and the Academy of Humanities and Social Sciences, depending on the subject. The university research facilities and device are purchased, maintained, and evaluated by the Office of Laboratory and Equipment Management. The Department of General Affairs and the Office of Capital Construction are responsible for the management and construction of the university properties. The Medical Management Office manages the affiliated hospitals.

=== Academic Structure ===
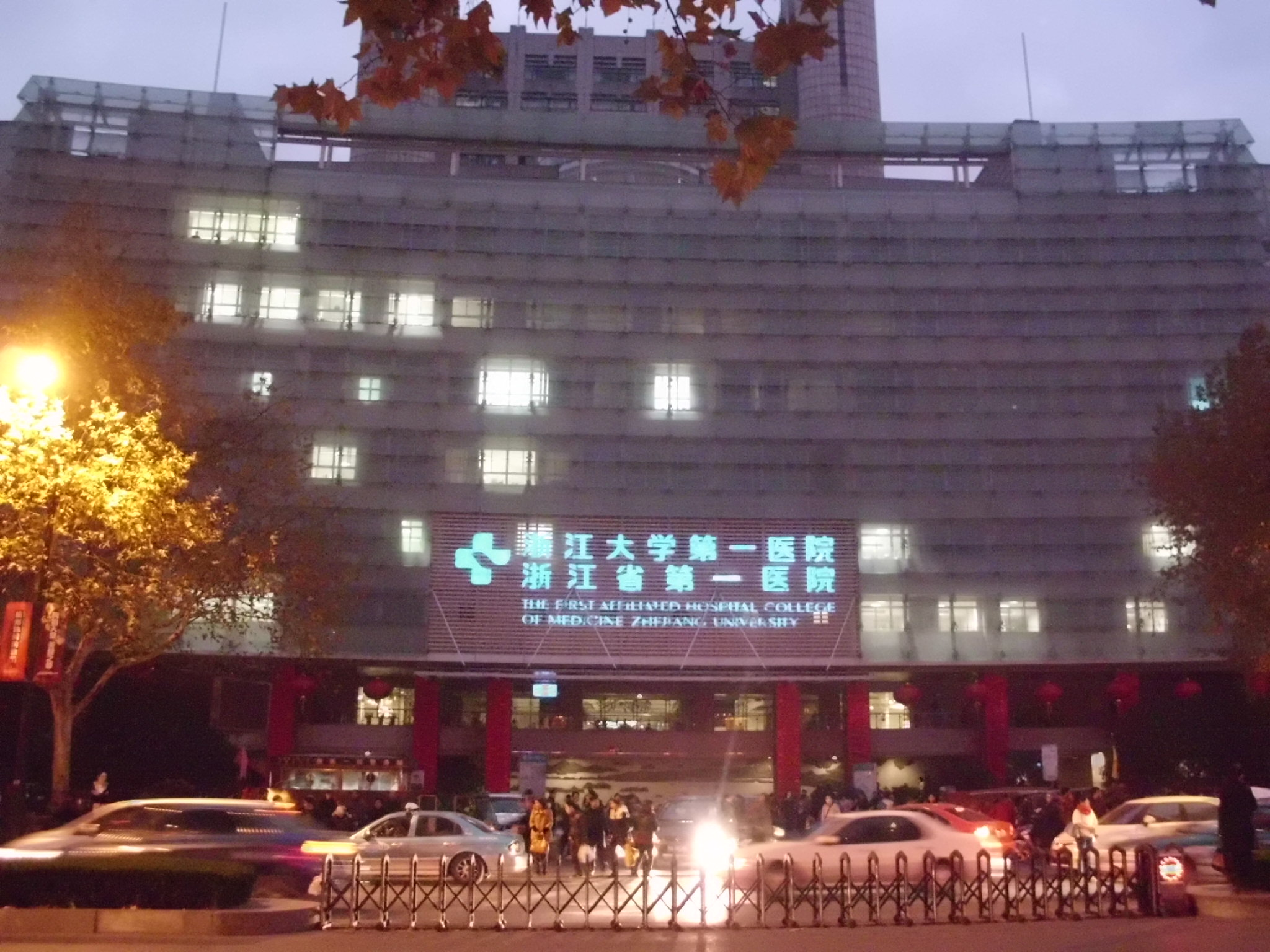
The First Affiliated Hospital of Zhejiang University School of Medicine was ranked as tenth best hospital in China by the Institute of Hospital Management, Fudan University.

The academic disciplines at the university are divided into seven faculties, which each has different schools. Each faculty, school and department has its own academic committee and different rules of procedures. The committee is organized by the faculty, with a restriction on the percentage of people who serve administrative roles. Selection of the members are based on recommendations within the faculty. The university is a key comprehensive university whose fields of study cover eleven branches of learning, namely philosophy, literature, history, education, science, economics, law, management, engineering, agriculture, and medicine. Below is the list of academic faculties, schools and colleges of the university:

==== Faculty of Arts and Humanities ====
- School of Humanities
- School of International Studies
- College of Media and International Culture
- School of Art and Archaeology

==== Faculty of Social Sciences ====
- School of Economics
- Guanghua Law School
- College of Education
- School of Management
- School of Public Affairs
- School of Marxism

==== Faculty of Science ====
The Faculty of Science was a combination of the sciences departments at Hangzhou University and Zhejiang University

- School of Mathematical Sciences
- Department of Physics
- Department of Chemistry
- School of Earth Sciences
- Department of Psychology and Behavioral Sciences

==== Faculty of Engineering ====
- School of Mechanical Engineering
- School of Material Science and Engineering
- College of Energy Engineering
- College of Electrical Engineering
- College of Civil Engineering and Architecture
- College of Chemical and Biological Engineering
- Ocean College
- School of Aeronautics and Astronautics
- Department of Polymer Science and Engineering

==== Faculty of Information ====
The Faculty of Information consists of most key departments of Zhejiang University before the 1998 merger. The School of Software Technology was founded in 2001 and is located in both Hangzhou and Ningbo. Entry into the College of Computer Science and Technology is considered to be one of the most competitive in China. Its computer science department specialises in computer graphics, computer vision, and artificial intelligence, which are the computer science domains where Zhejiang University is ranked among top 5 worldwide according to CSranking. In the fourth round of CUSR, among the subjects that the faculty offers, Optical Engineering, Control Science and engineering, Computer Science and technology, and Software Engineering were rated A+, and Biomedical Engineering was rated A-.

- College of Optical Science and Engineering
- College of Information Science and Electronic Engineering
- College of Control Science and Engineering
- College of Computer Science and Technology
- School of Software Technology
- College of Biomedical Engineering and Instrument Science

==== Faculty of Agriculture, Life and Environment Science ====
The Faculty of Agriculture, Life and Environment Science (FALE) consists of most departments of Zhejiang Agricultural University before the 1998 merger. In the fourth round of CUSR, among the subjects that the faculty offers, Agricultural Engineering, Horticulture, Agricultural Resources and environment, and Plant protection wer rated A+, Environmental Science and Engineering, and Pharmacy were rated A, Food Science and engineering, Crop Science, Animal Science were rated A-. It has the most subjects rated A-/A/A+ across all faculties at the university.

- College of Life Sciences
- College of Biosystem Engineering and Food Science
- College of Environmental and Resource Sciences
- College of Agriculture and Biotechnology
- College of Animal Sciences

==== Faculty of Medicine ====
The Faculty of Medicine consists of most departments of Zhejiang Medical University before the 1998 merger, with their roots dating back to Chekiang Provincial Medical School founded in 1912, the Pharmaceutical Department of National Chekiang University founded in 1944 and the Medical School of National Chekiang University founded in 1945. The faculty used to be based at Hubin Campus until it is relocated to Zijingang in 2007. The School of Medicine is also among the 45 Chinese medical schools to offer English teaching Bachelor of Medicine and Bachelor of Surgery (MBBS) programs. It also recruits medical doctoral students from prestigious Chu Kochen Honors College in a program named Ba Denian Medical Program. The School of Basic Medical Sciences offers a joint undergraduate programs in biomedicine and bioinformatics at International Campus. Under the School of Medicine, there are seven top-level hospitals. In the fourth round of CUSR, its clinical medicine, pharmacy and basic medicine are rated A+, A and A-, respectively.

- College of Pharmaceutical Sciences
- School of Medicine

Under the School of Medicine, there are seven affiliated hospitals, including:

- First Affiliated Hospital (as the first teaching hospital)
- Second Affiliated Hospital (as the second teaching hospital)
- Sir Run Run Shaw Hospital (as the third teaching hospital)
- Fourth Affiliated Hospital (also called Yiwu Hospital, as the fourth teaching hospital)
- Women's Hospital
- Children's Hospital
- Stomatology Hospital (also called Zhejiang Provincial Stomatology Hospital)

=== Finances ===
According to the University Chapter, the university is largely funded by the government. The university has been selected into several national plans to nurture world-class universities, including Double First-Class Construction, Project 985 and Project 211. In 2022, with a budget of 26.1 billion Chinese yuan, the university had the second largest budget in China after Tsinghua. The university also raises money through income from its affiliations, government subsidy, donations and other legal sources of income. Zhejiang University consistently stands among top receivers of alumni donations in China. In 2021, it received 2.38 billion Chinese yuan, the fourth most after Tsinghua, Peking and Wuhan. On September 21, 2006, Chinese billionaires Duan Yongping (Zhejiang University alumnus) and Ding Lei (Zhejiang native) donated together a one-time endowment of 40 million US dollars to Zhejiang University. US$30 million was from Duan with 10 million from Ding. It was the largest private one-off endowment to a university in Mainland China. In 2017, the university received a donation of 1.1 billion Chinese yuan (circa.160 million US dollars), again breaking the record for highest alumni donation.

== Academics ==
=== Teaching and learning ===
The academic departments are responsible for teaching and assessments of various courses and draft the details of degree programs, which needs to be approved by the Undergraduate and Graduate Schools before start; the detailed method may differ according to the course and the program. Teaching is supervised and regulated by the Undergraduate School and the Graduate School for quality control. Chu Kochen Honors College (CKC), named after the university's former president Chu Kochen, is an elite undergraduate college of ZJU, which further select students from top students at ZJU or in Gaokao. Teaching at Chu Kochen Honors College and international dual degree programs at Haining are supervised and regulated by their own responsible committees.

Degree awarding is based on academic credits requirement for compulsory and elective courses, which a student must both fulfill to graduate. To earn academic credits, the student can choose and pass a combination of courses at his or her will, as long as the course is available for enrolment, yet some courses may be competitive for enrolment due to class size limits.

==== Qiushi College ====
Qiushi College was founded in July 2008, as a residential college and part of the School of Undergraduate. It managed the student dormitories including the Danyang-Qingxi Hall, the Ziyun-Bifeng Hall, and the Lantian Hall. It offers liberal arts education for freshmen and supports student organizations and activities. It also provides students with aids for academic affairs such as college major choices and team building. Upon enrolment into the university, undergraduates join a hall of Qiushi College at Zijingang mostly according to their faculties of study. In the student military training and education for all Chinese national freshmen, the students are organized according to their halls within the college. In the first year of study, the major of the student may be unspecified as they are recruited according to academic faculties rather than specific academic subjects. They are considered to be a student of the Hall but not of an academic department then. The student may later apply to study a major later or transfer to another major during the study, yet the application to popular majors are highly competitive and additional requirements may apply. The college is responsible for providing assistance to the student.

==== Chu Kochen Honors College ====
Chu Kochen Honors College (CKHC) was founded in May 2000 in honour of Chu Kochen, a former president of the university and is typically chaired by the current president of Zhejiang University. Its predecessor the Mixed Class of Engineering was launched in 1984. It offers a collection of programs including the Experimental Class of Engineering, the Mixed Class, the Experimental Class of Humanities and Social Sciences, the Qiushi Sciences Class, the Experimental Class of Medicine, the Shennong Class. Entry into the college is highly selective and competitive and its selection questions are known to be creative but difficult. Notable alumni of the college include entrepreneur Colin Huang and the current president of Zhejiang University Wu Zhaohui. Its teaching and learning are supervised by a special committee headed by the president. During the program, 15–20 percentile of the CKHC students in term of GPA will be transferred to non-CKHC programs.

==== International Campus ====
The dual degree programs at the International Campus are supervised and regulated by the joint institute to fulfill academic requirements of both Zhejiang University and the partner institutes. For example, the University of Edinburgh regulations on progression and degree classification also applies to its joint institute at the campus, although they are not part of Zhejiang University regulations. The campus only provides a limited number of elective courses and allows students to elect a course that is not offered at his or her own institute. However, transfer from a Sino-foreign program to a purely ZJU program or between two programs of different joint institutes are not allowed. Transfer within the joint institute is allowed, yet its approval may be subject to the class size.

=== Research ===
Zhejiang University is a comprehensive research university. Research at Zhejiang University spans 12 academic disciplines: agriculture, art, economics, education, engineering, history, law, literature, management, medicine, natural sciences, and philosophy.

Among its approximate 4,191 standing faculty members, more than 1,893 faculty members hold the title of professor. The faculty includes: 26 members of the Chinese Academy of Sciences, 27 members of the Chinese Academy of Engineering, 164 Chang Jiang (Yangtze River) Award winners, and 154 recipients of the awards from the National Science Fund for Distinguished Young Scholars. Zhejiang University also has prominent foreign faculty members. Zhejiang University has 11 State Key Laboratories, as one of the universities with most SKLs in China, which include:

- Rice Biology, State Key Lab of
- Chemical Engineering, State Key Lab of
- Modern Optical Instrumentation, State Key Lab of
- Industrial Control Technology, State Key Lab of
- Fluid Power Transmission and Control, State Key Lab of
- CAD and Computer Graphics, State Key Lab of
- Diagnosis and Treatment of Infectious Diseases, State Key Lab of
- Clean Energy Utilization, State Key Lab of
- Silicon Materials, State Key Lab of
- Plant Physiology and Biochemistry, State Key Lab of
- Modern Optical Instrumentation, State Key Lab of

The university also has three State Specialized Labs, including the State Specialized Lab of Secondary Resources Chemical Engineering, the State Specialized Lab of Power Electronics, and the State Specialized Lab of Biomedical Sensor. Besides, the university has three labs of the Ministry of Education (MOE), including the MOE Key Lab of Soft Soils and Geoenvironmental Engineering, the MOE Key Lab of Conservation Genetics and Reproductive Biology for Endangered Wildlife and the MOE-Microsoft Key Lab of Visual Perception.

=== Library system ===
The library system has a total library collection of more than 7.9 million volumes, which is one of China's largest academic collections. The system has 6 branch libraries, namely Yuquan Campus Library, Basic Library of Zijingang Campus, Library of Agriculture and Medicine of Zijingang Campus, Library of Ancient Books of Zijingang Campus, Xixi Campus Library and Hujiachi Campus Library, plus 3 branch libraries within different colleges, namely Guanghua Law School Library, International Campus Library, Ocean College Library. Zijingang Campus is the only campus to have three library. One can reserve a book at any library for collection of a book that may belong to another library in the system.

== Rankings and reputation ==
University rankings
| BCUR National | Domestic | 3 |
| Wu Shulian National | Domestic | 2 |
| CUAA National | Alumni | 5 |
| QS National | General | 5 |
| THE National | General | 4 |
| QS Asia (Asia version) | General | 8 |
| THE Asia (Asia version) | General | 8 |
| ARWU World | Research | 24 |
| QS World | General | 47 |
| THE World | General | 39 |
| USNWR World | General | 35 |

=== General rankings ===
Globally, ZJU is #24 globally (#3 in Asia & Oceania) in the Academic Ranking of World Universities 2025, #44 in QS World University Rankings 2024, #39 in the Times Higher Education (THE) World University Rankings 2026, and #35 in the USNWR 2026–2027.

ZJU was #33 worldwide (#5 in Asia and # 3 in China) in terms of aggregate performance across THE, QS, and, ARWU in 2024.

ZJU was #50 worldwide (#7 in Asia) in the Times Higher Education World Reputation Rankings.

=== Research performance ===
- As of 2024, ZJU was ranked 5th among universities worldwide by SCImago Institutions Rankings.
- The 2025 CWTS Leiden Ranking ranked ZJU 1st globally based on the number of scientific publications during 2020–2023.
- Regarding scientific research output among academic institutions, the Nature Index Annual Table 2026 ranked ZJU #1 worldwide.

=== Subjects rankings ===
==== ESI ====
In the Essential Science Indicator (ESI) rankings of 22 disciplines, ZJU ranks among the top 1% in 15 disciplines and is listed in the top 100 of the world's academic institutions in 4 disciplines.

==== USNWR ====
As of 2021, the U.S. News & World Report placed ZJU in the global Top 50 for "Agricultural Sciences", "Biotechnology and Applied Microbiology", "Chemical Engineering", "Chemistry", "Civil Engineering", "Computer Science", "Condensed Matter Physics", "Electrical and Electronic Engineering", "Energy and Fuels", "Engineering", "Food Science and Technology", "Material Science", "Mechanical Engineering", "Nanoscience and Nanotechnology", "Optics", "Physical Chemistry", "Pharmacology and Toxicology", "Plant and Animal Science" and "Polymer Science".

==== China's MOE Evaluation ====
In the fourth round of China University Subject Rankings by the Ministry of Education released in 2018, ZJU had 31 subjects rated A, the most among Chinese universities, among which 11 subjects were rated A+, the third most after Peking and Tsinghua. Below is the list of A+/A/A- subjects of ZJU.

| Rating | Subjects |
|---|---|
| A+ | Ecology • Optical Engineering • Control Science and Engineering • Computer Science and Technology • Agricultural Engineering • Software Engineering • Horticulture science • Agricultural Resource and Environment Sciences • Plant protection • Clinical Medicine |
| A | Chinese Language and Literature • Foreign Language and Literatures • Mechanical Engineering • Materials Science and Engineering • Power Engineering and Engineering Thermophysics • Civil Engineering • Chemical Engineering and Technology • Environmental Science and Engineering • Management Science and Engineering • Pharmaceutical Science • Public Administration |
| A- | Theoretical Economics • Theory of Marxism • Science of Law • Education • Mathematics • Physics • Chemistry • Biology • Electrical Engineering • Electronic Science and Technology • Biomedical Engineering • Food Science and Engineering • Animal Science • Crop Science • Basic Medicine • Business Administration • Design |

=== Graduate Employability ===
ZJU ranked #35 worldwide in the QS Graduate Employability Rankings 2022 and #71 worldwide in the Times Higher Education's Global University Employability Ranking 2025.

== Student life ==
=== Student body ===
In June 2023, there were a total of 65,821 full-time students enrolled at Zhejiang University, including 29,117 undergraduates, 20,554 master's candidates and 16,150 doctoral candidates. In June 2023, there were 5,123 international students studying at Zhejiang University.

=== CC98 forum ===
CC98 is a student-run forum. It was created in December 2002. It can be accessed by visiting www.cc98.org on the school intranet. It consists of categorical boards for discussion on various topics. As of March 2023, the forum is available only in Chinese.

== Notable people ==
=== Alumni ===
- Chen Duxiu – the co-founder, the first General Secretary and first Chairman of Chinese Communist Party
- Li Qiang – eighth Premier of China
- Liang Wenfeng – co-founder of High-Flyer, founder and CEO of DeepSeek
- Chen Tianhua – Qiushi Academy and the member of Chinese United League and reporter of The People's Daily
- Xie Xuren – Minister of Finance of the People's Republic of China
- Hu Qiaomu – the first President of Chinese Academy of Social Sciences, President of Xinhua News Agency
- Huang Fu – President and Premier of the Republic of China
- Jiang Menglin – Minister of Education (1928–1930) of the Republic of China
- Chen Yi – Chief Executive and Garrison Commander of Taiwan
- Zhang Xinsheng – Chairman of UNESCO's Executive Board
- Ye Duzheng – meteorologist, State Preeminent Science and Technology Award winner 2005
- Xu Guangxian – chemist, State Preeminent Science and Technology Award winner 2009
- Hsiao-Lan Kuo – meteorologist, Carl-Gustaf Rossby Research Medal winner 1970
- Xie Xuejing – geochemist, AAG Gold Medal winner 2007
- Lin Fanghua – mathematician, Bôcher Memorial Prize winner 2002
- Hu Hesheng – mathematician, Noether Lecturer 2002
- Xu-Jia Wang – mathematician, Australian Mathematical Society Medal winner 2002
- T. Tony Cai – statistician, COPSS Presidents' Award winner 2008
- Tsung-Dao Lee – physicist, Nobel Prize laureate (physics, 1957)
- Chien-Shiung Wu – physicist, Wolf Prize laureate (physics, 1978)
- Xu Liangying – physicist, Andrei Sakharov Prize recipient 2008
- Chen Hang – horticulturist, Veitch Memorial Medal winner 1990
- Kun-Liang Guan – biochemist, MacArthur Award winner 1998
- Tao-Chiuh Hsu – biologist, the 13th President of American Society for Cell Biology
- Yao Zhen – biologist, the first President of Asian-Pacific Organization for Cell Biology
- Qiu Fazu – surgeon, Bundesverdienstkreuz recipient 1985
- Wu Guanzhong – painter, Ordre des Arts et des Lettres recipient 1991
- Lu Yongxiang – President of Chinese Academy of Sciences
- Ding Zhongli – Vice-president of Chinese Academy of Sciences
- Pan Yunhe – Vice-president of Chinese Academy of Engineering
- Pan Jiazheng – Vice-president of Chinese Academy of Engineering
- Wang Xufeng – writer, Mao Dun Literature Prize winner 2000
- Min Zhu – co-founder and former president and CTO of WebEx
- Cha Chi Ming – industrialist, entrepreneur, philanthropist, Grand Bauhinia Medal winner 1997
- Zhu Yanfeng – President of First Automotive Works
- Wang Jianzhou – Chairman & CEO of China Mobile
- Wang Tianpu – President of Sinopec
- Shi Zhengrong – Founder & CEO of Suntech Power
- Zhu Qinan – shooter, 10 m Air Rifle olympic champion, 2004 Athens
- Zhou Suhong – volleyball player, 2003 World Cup and 2004 Athens Olympic Games team champion.

=== Faculty ===
- Hailan Hu – laureate of the 2022 L'Oréal-UNESCO for Women in Science International Award
- Shing-Tung Yau – Fields Medalist, founder and director of the Center of Mathematical Sciences, Zhejiang University
- Shiing-Shen Chern – Wolf Prize laureate, former director and advisor of the Center of Mathematical Sciences
- Chien-Shiung Wu – Wolf Prize laureate
- Ren Mei'e – Victoria Medal winner 1986, former professor and dean of the Department of Geology
- Wu Wenjun – Shaw Prize laureate 2006, former teacher of Hangzhou University
- Liu Chen – Hannes Alfvén Prize recipient 2008, professor and director
- Su Buqing – mathematician, co-founder of Chen-Su School, former dean of the Department of Mathematics, former provost of Zhejiang University
- Chen Jiangong – mathematician, co-founder of Chen-Su School, former dean of the Department of Mathematics
- Bei Shizhang – biologist, former co-founder and professor of the Department of Biology
- Tan Jiazhen – geneticist, former professor of the Department of Biology, former dean of the College of Science
- Chang Chi-yun – historian, geologist, politician
- Coching Chu – meteorologist, geologist, former president of Zhejiang University
- Ma Yinchu – economist, former president of Zhejiang University
- Jiang Menglin – educator, former president of Zhejiang University
- Jin Au Kong – Electromagnetist, founder and former president of the Electromagnetics Academy
- Jin Yong – novelist, former dean of the Faculty of Arts and Humanities
- Qian Sanqiang – physicist
- Kan-Chang Wang – physicist, discover of the Sigma baryon, proposed neutrino detection which led to neutrino discovery, former dean of the Department of Physics
- Xia Yan – playwright, screenwriter
- Zhao Feng – art historian

== See also ==
- Qiushi Academy, Hangchow University, Hangzhou University, Zhejiang Agricultural University and Zhejiang Medical University
- C9 League, Education in China, and Higher Education in China
- Taizhou Library
