= Chen Jiangong =

Chinese mathematician

- 陈建功
- Born: 1893
- Died: 1971 (aged 77–78)
- Education: Tokyo Tech; Tokyo Academy of Physics; Tohoku Imperial University
- Known for: Pioneering modern Chinese mathematics, founding the Chen-Su school of mathematics
- Scientific career
- Fields: Mathematics
- Workplaces: Zhejiang Industrial School; National Wuchang University; National Chekiang University; National Taiwan University; Academica Sinica; Fudan University; Hangzhou University

Chinese name
- Traditional Chinese: 陳建功
- Simplified Chinese: 陈建功
Transcriptions
Standard Mandarin
- Hanyu Pinyin: Chén Jiàngōng
- Wade–Giles: Ch'en Chien-kung

Chen Jiangong (Chinese: 陈建功; 1893–1971), or Jian-gong Chen, was a Chinese mathematician. He was a pioneer of modern Chinese mathematics. He was the dean of the Department of Mathematics, National Chekiang University (now Zhejiang University), and a founding academician the Chinese Academy of Sciences (elected 1955).

== Early life and education ==
Chen was born in Shanyin County (now Shaoxing), Zhejiang Province during the late Qing dynasty. He studied at Shanyin School and later Shaoxing Prefecture School. In 1910 he entered the Zhejiang Advanced Normal School, a teacher-training institution which was later merged into National Chekiang University.

Chen later went to Japan to continue his studies. In 1916, he graduated from the Tokyo Institute of Technology, where he majored in textile technology, and the Tokyo Academy of Physics (now known as the Tokyo University of Science).

== Career ==
After graduating from Tohoku Imperial University in 1923, Chen returned to China and became a lecturer at the Zhejiang Industrial School, which was later merged into National Chekiang University. In 1924, he went to Wuhan, Hubei Province, and became a professor at National Wuchang University (now Wuhan University).

In 1926, Chen returned to Tohoku Imperial University to continue his studies in mathematics, completing his Ph.D. in 1929 and becoming the first international student awarded a Ph.D. by a Japanese university. It was during this time that he met his later colleague Su Buqing, a fellow mathematics Ph.D. candidate.

After earning his doctorate, Chen was offered teaching positions at institutions including Peking University and Wuhan University. However, on the invitation of National Chekiang University president Shao Feizhi, Chen returned to Zhejiang University to serve as dean of the Department of Mathematics, a position he held for the next 20 years.

After earning his doctorate in 1931, Su Buqing was invited to join Chen's department and take over his position as department chair, allowing Chen to focus more on research. Their collaboration resulted in the Chen-Su school of mathematics in Hangzhou.

The outbreak of the Second Sino-Japanese War in 1937 forced Chen, and much of Zhejiang University, to relocate from Hangzhou. In February 1940, Chen arrived at Zunyi, and then subsequently Meitan, Guizhou Province, where he helped re-establish the colleges of engineering and sciences.

In 1945, after the end of the Second Sino-Japanese War, Chen was invited by biologist Luo Zongluo (Lo Tsung-lo), who was serving as the 1st president of National Taiwan University (formerly Taihoku Imperial University), as well as the Nationalist government in Nanjing, to travel to Taipei and serve as acting dean of NTU during its reorganization.

In the spring of 1946, Chen returned to mainland China (then still controlled by Nationalist government), where he continued teaching in National Chekiang University and became a researcher in the Mathematics Research Institute at the Academia Sinica. From 1947 to 1948, Chen traveled to the United States to do research at the Institute for Advanced Study in Princeton, New Jersey. He was elected an academician of the Academia Sinica in 1948.

After the Chinese Civil War, Chen remained in Zhejiang, now part of the People's Republic of China.

In 1952, Zhejiang University was dissociated and its colleges of sciences and humanities were merged with Fudan University in Shanghai. Both Chen and Su Buqing moved to Fudan University, where they continued their cooperation and the Chen-Su school of mathematics. While in Shanghai, Chen translated many mathematical works produced in the USSR.

In recognition of his advancements in the field of mathematics, in 1955 Chen was elected an academician of the Chinese Academy of Sciences in its inaugural year.

In 1958, some departments of Zhejiang University were split from the university in order to form Hangzhou University (which eventually merged back into Zhejiang University in 1998). Chen was appointed to vice president of Hangzhou University and moved back to Hangzhou.

== Notable students ==
- Gu Chaohao – mathematician, former president of the University of Science and Technology of China
- Xia Daoxing – mathematician
- Hu Hesheng – mathematician, 2002 Noether Lecturer
