= Shanghai Datong High School =

- 大同中学

Location
- 353 Nanchezhan Road; Shanghai; China

Information
- Type: Public
- Motto: 笃学敦行 立己达人
- Established: 1912
- Founder: Hu Dunfu
- Principal: Sheng Yaping (盛雅萍)
- Faculty: 140
- Enrollment: 1,700
- Campus: 33,550 square metres (8.29 acres)
- Website: dt.hpe.sh.cn

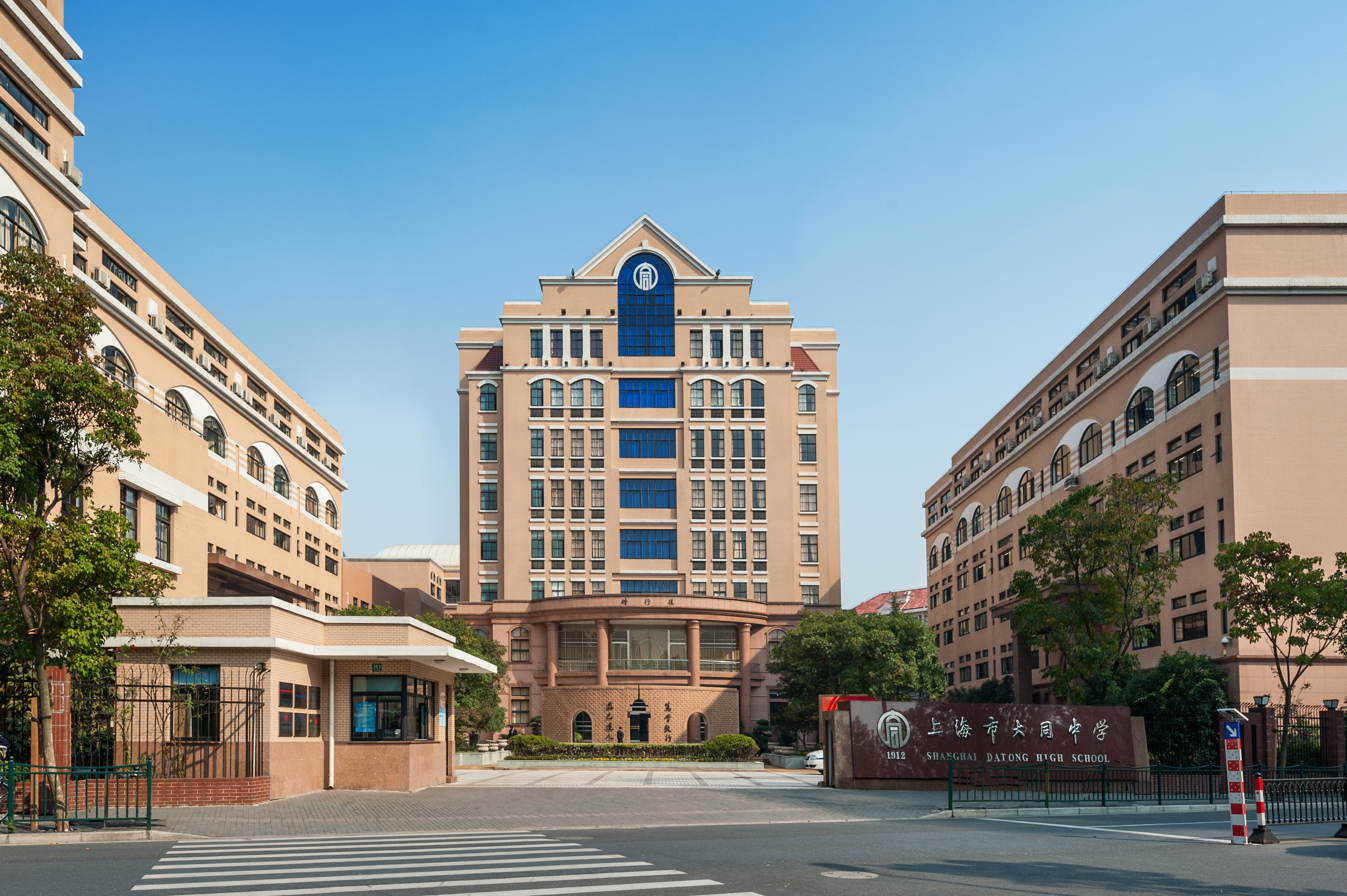
Min De Building(left), Shi Xing Building(center) and Jin Qu Building(right)

Shanghai Datong High School (上海市大同中学) is a public secondary school in Huangpu, Shanghai, China.
