= Su Buqing =

Chinese mathematician

Su Buqing, also spelled Su Buchin (simplified Chinese: 苏步青; traditional Chinese: 蘇步青; September 23, 1902 – March 17, 2003), was a Chinese mathematician, educator and poet. He was the founder of differential geometry in China, and served as president of Fudan University and honorary chairman of the Chinese Mathematical Society.

== Early life ==
Su was born in Pingyang County, Zhejiang Province in 1902, with ancestry from Quanzhou.

Su's academic journey began in 1911 when he transferred to the First Primary School in Pingyang County and was subsequently admitted to the Zhejiang Provincial Tenth Middle School in 1914. In 1919, Su was offered a scholarship by the principal of his middle school to study in Japan. Su successfully passed the entrance examination for Tokyo Higher Technical College in February 1920 and enrolled in the Department of Electrical Engineering where he graduated from in March 1924. After that, he was admitted to the Department of Mathematics of Tohoku Imperial University in Japan and graduated in 1927. Under the supervision of Tadahiko Kubota, Su received his Ph.D. from the university in 1931 for dissertation entitled The relation between affine and projective differential geometry.

During his time in Tohoku Imperial University, Su met and married Yonako Matsumoto in 1928.

== Career ==
After returning to China, he first served as a professor and dean at Zhejiang University (he established the Chen-Su School with Chen Jiangong). When universities across China underwent reorganization in 1952, Su and his students from Zhejiang University's Department of Mathematics relocated to Fudan University where he initially served as the Provost and later became the honorary President of Fudan University in 1978.

He was honorary chairman of the Chinese Mathematical Society (CMS) and elected to Academia Sinica and the Chinese Academy of Sciences in 1948 and 1955 respectively.

In 1985, the Publicity Department of the Zhejiang Provincial Party Committee appointed Su as the honorary President of Wenzhou University. Additionally, he provided guidance and supervision in the establishment of the Shanghai Society of Industrial and Applied Mathematics in 1989 and the China Society of Industrial and Applied Mathematics (CSIAM) in 1990, serving as a consultant for the latter.

Some other positions Su held included member of the sixth (1983–88) and later vice chairman of the seventh and eighth (1988–98) National Committee of the Chinese People's Political Consultative Conference (CPPCC), honorary chairman of the China Democratic League Central Committee (1997), and Conference and deputy to the National People's Congress (NPC).

== Research ==
Praised commonly in mathematical field as the "first geometer in the orient", Su was engaged in research, teaching and education in differential geometry and computational geometry. In his early years, he made excellent contributions to affine differential geometry and projective differential geometry. He obtained extraordinary achievements in general space differential geometry, conjugating net theory in higher-dimensional space and computer aided geometry design.

Su's research on general surfaces led to the discovery of quartic algebraic surfaces of the third order. In recognition of his achievements, a geometric shape known as the "Su-cone" was named after him. In the 1940s, he made notable contributions to the theory of K-spreads, involving families of K-dimensional manifolds in space.

Throughout his career, Su authored over 160 mathematical papers published in both domestic and international journals. He also wrote more than 20 monographs and textbooks on topics such as projective curves, projective surfaces, and affine differential geometry. Su's main papers are included in Selected Works of Buqing Su (1991). Notable among his works are "The General Projective Theory of Curves," (English translation 1958) "Affine Differential Geometry," (English translation 1983) and "Computational Geometry, Curve and Surface Modeling," (Chinese 1980; English edition 1989) co-authored with Dingyuan Liu.

== Honors and awards ==
Su won the second prize of the first National Natural Science Award in 1956 for his work on "Geometry of K-spread Space and General Metric Space, Projective Curve Theory."

In 1978, his work, A Program of Hull Lofting, won the National Science Conference Award.

Su won the second prize of the first National Science and Technology Progress Award in 1985 for his collaborative effort on "A Production Process of the Hull Form by the Curved-Surface Method."

In 2001, the book, Geometry and Nonlinear Partial Differential Equations, which presents the proceedings of a conference on geometry and nonlinear partial differential equations, was dedicated to Su in honor of his one-hundredth birthday.

In August 2003, the International Council for Industrial and Applied Mathematics (ICIAM) established the "ICIAM Su Buqing Award" in recognition to contributions to the application of mathematics in economic growth and human development. Furthermore, the Chinese Society for Industrial and Applied Mathematics (CSIAM) established the "CSIAM Su Buqing Applied Mathematics Award" in 2004.

Asteroid 297161 Subuchin, discovered by astronomers of the PMO NEO Survey Program in 2008, was named in his memory. The official naming citation was published by the Minor Planet Center on 8 November 2019 (M.P.C. 118221).

== Publications ==
- Buqing, Su. (1958). The General Projective Theory of Curves: She Ying Qu Xian Gai Lun. Peking: Science Press. Print.
- Buqing, Su. (1983). Affine Differential Geometry. Beijing, China: Science Press. Print. ISBN 978-0-677-31060-2 (Gordon and Breach)
- Buqing, Su & Ding-Yuan, Liu. (1989). Computational Geometry: Curve and Surface Modeling. Academic Press. ISBN 978-0-12-675610-4. doi:10.1016/B978-0-12-675610-4.50013-5
- Buqing, Su. (1991). Selected Works of Buqing Su. ISBN 7-5341-0383-5.
