= List of biogeographic provinces =

Overview of the world's biogeographic provinces

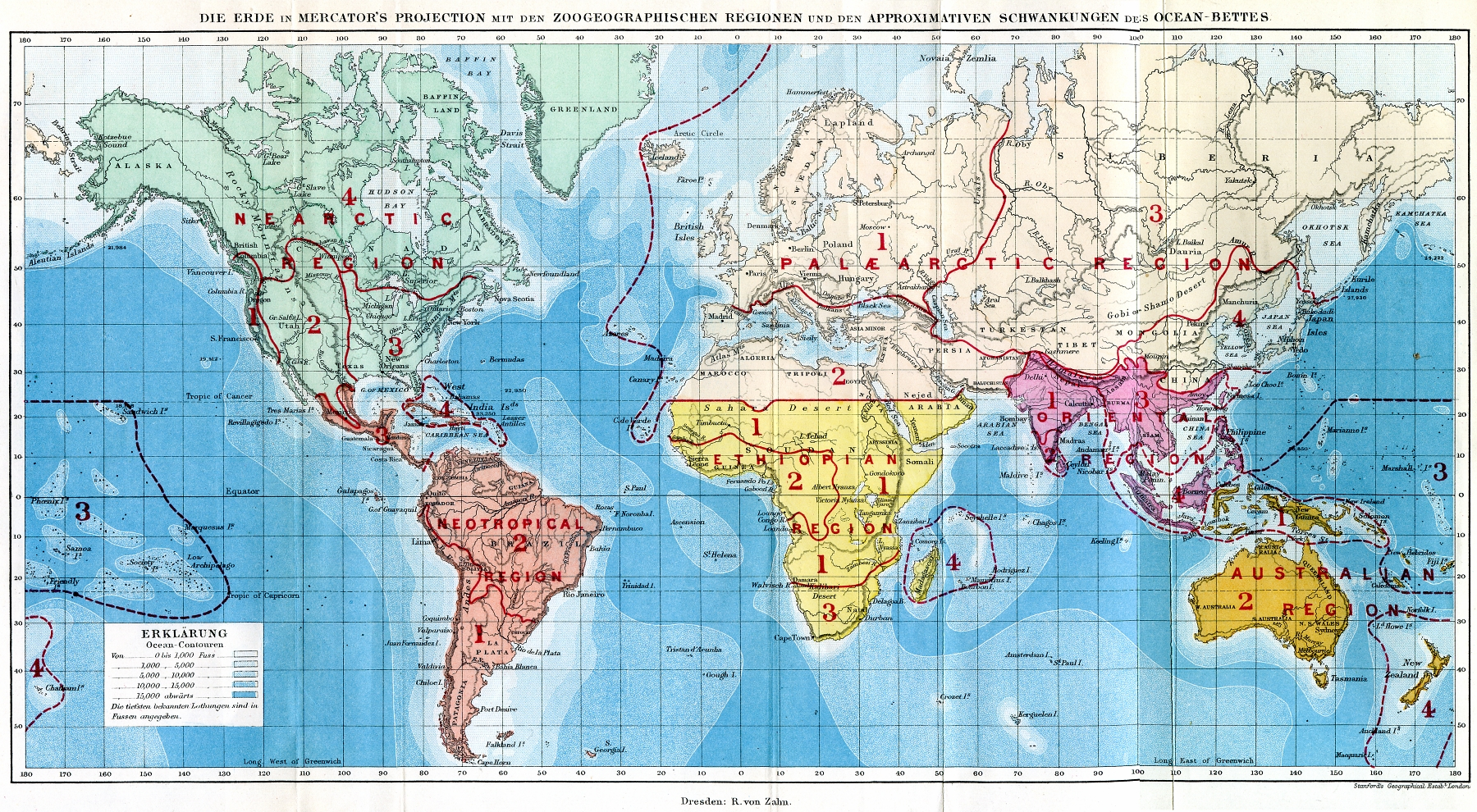
A map of the zoogeographical realms by Alfred Russel Wallace, which practically correspond to the biogeographic provinces developed by Miklos Udvardy. Nearctic Palearctic Ethiopian (Afrotropic) Oriental (Indomalaya) Australian (Australasia and Oceania) Neotropic

This page features a list of biogeographic provinces that were developed by Miklos Udvardy in 1975, later modified by other authors. Biogeographic Province is a biotic subdivision of biogeographic realms subdivided into ecoregions, which are classified based on their biomes or habitat types and, on this page, correspond to the floristic kingdoms of botany.

The provinces represent the large areas of Earth's surface within which organisms have been evolving in relative isolation over long periods of time, separated from one another by geographic features, such as oceans, broad deserts, or high mountain ranges, that constitute barriers to migration.

Biomes are characterized by similar climax vegetation, though each realm may include a number of different biomes. A tropical moist broadleaf forest in Brazil, for example, may be similar to one in New Guinea in its vegetation type and structure, climate, soils, etc., but these forests are inhabited by plants with very different evolutionary histories.

== Afrotropical Realm ==
Ecoregions of the Afrotropical realm, color-coded by biome. This realm has 9 of 14 biomes, or major habitat types, as defined by Olson & Dinerstein, et al. (2001).: 01. Tropical and subtropical moist broadleaf forests; 02. Tropical and subtropical dry broadleaf forests; 03. Tropical and subtropical coniferous forests; 04. Temperate broadleaf and mixed forests; 05. Temperate coniferous forests; 06. Taiga and Boreal forest; 07. Tropical and subtropical grasslands, savannas, and shrublands; 08. Temperate grasslands, savannas, and shrublands; 09. Flooded grasslands and savannas; 10. Montane grasslands and shrublands; 11. Tundra; 12. Mediterranean forests, woodlands, and scrub; 13. Deserts and xeric shrublands; 14. Mangroves; Rock and Ice, or Abiotic Land Zones

- Tropical humid forests
  - Guinean Rainforest
  - Congo Rainforest
  - Malagasy Rainforest
- Tropical dry or deciduous forests (incl. Monsoon forests) or woodlands
  - West African Woodland/Savanna
  - East African Woodland/Savanna
  - Congo Woodland/Savanna
  - Miombo Woodland/Savanna
  - South African Woodland/Savanna
  - Malagasy Woodland/Savanna
  - Malagasy Thorn Forest
- Evergreen sclerophyllous forests, scrubs or woodlands
  - Cape Sclerophyll
- Warm deserts and semideserts
  - Western Sahel
  - Eastern Sahel
  - Somalian
  - Namib
  - Kalahari
  - Karroo
- Mixed mountain and highland systems with complex zonation
  - Ethiopian Highlands
  - Guinean Highlands
  - Central African Highlands
  - East African Highlands
  - South African Highlands
- Mixed island systems
  - Ascension and St. Helena Islands
  - Comores Islands and Aldabra
  - Mascarene Islands
- Lake systems
  - Lake Rudolph
  - Lake Ukerewe (Victoria)
  - Lake Tanganyika
  - Lake Malawi (Nyassa)
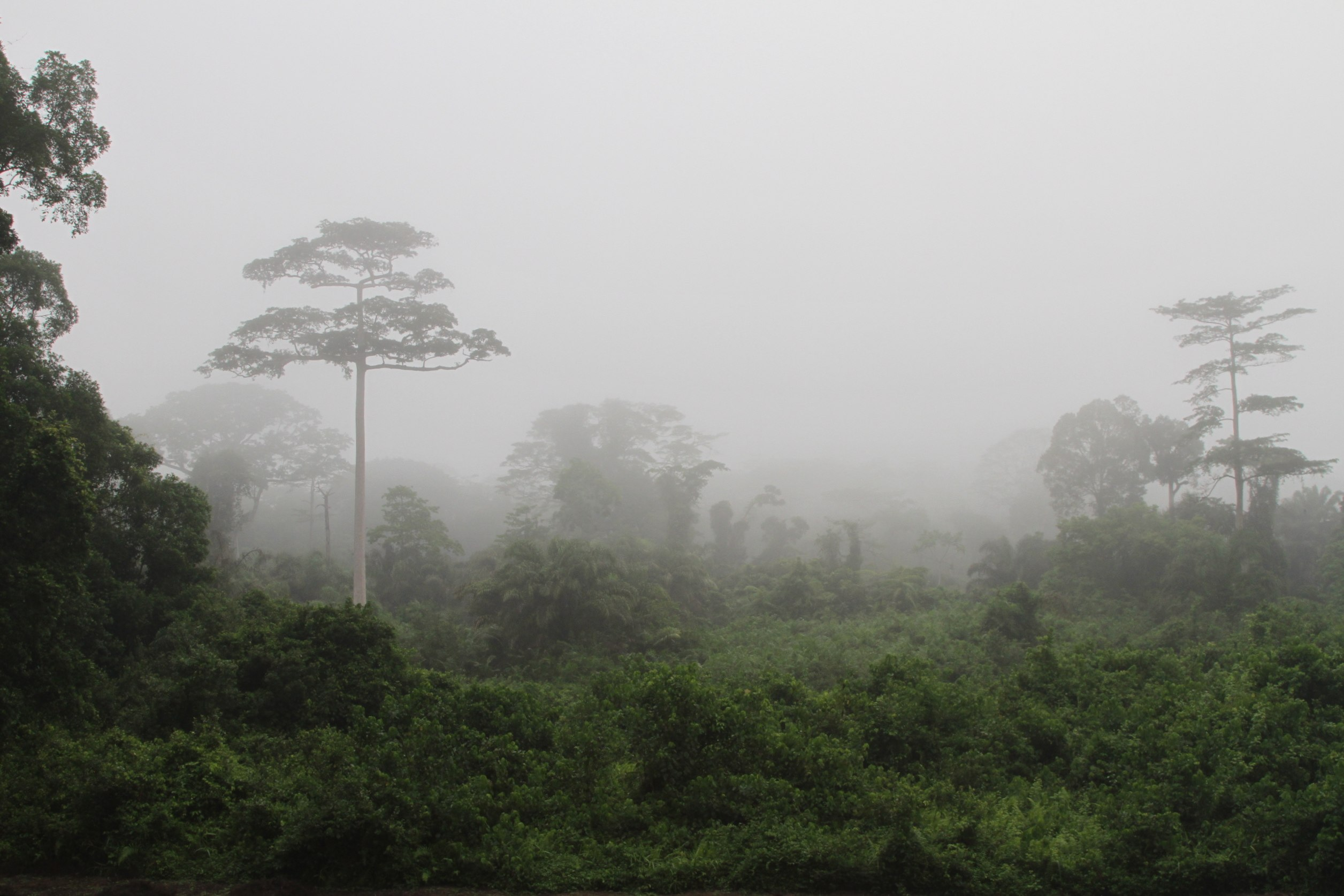
Western Guinean lowland forests, a humid forest

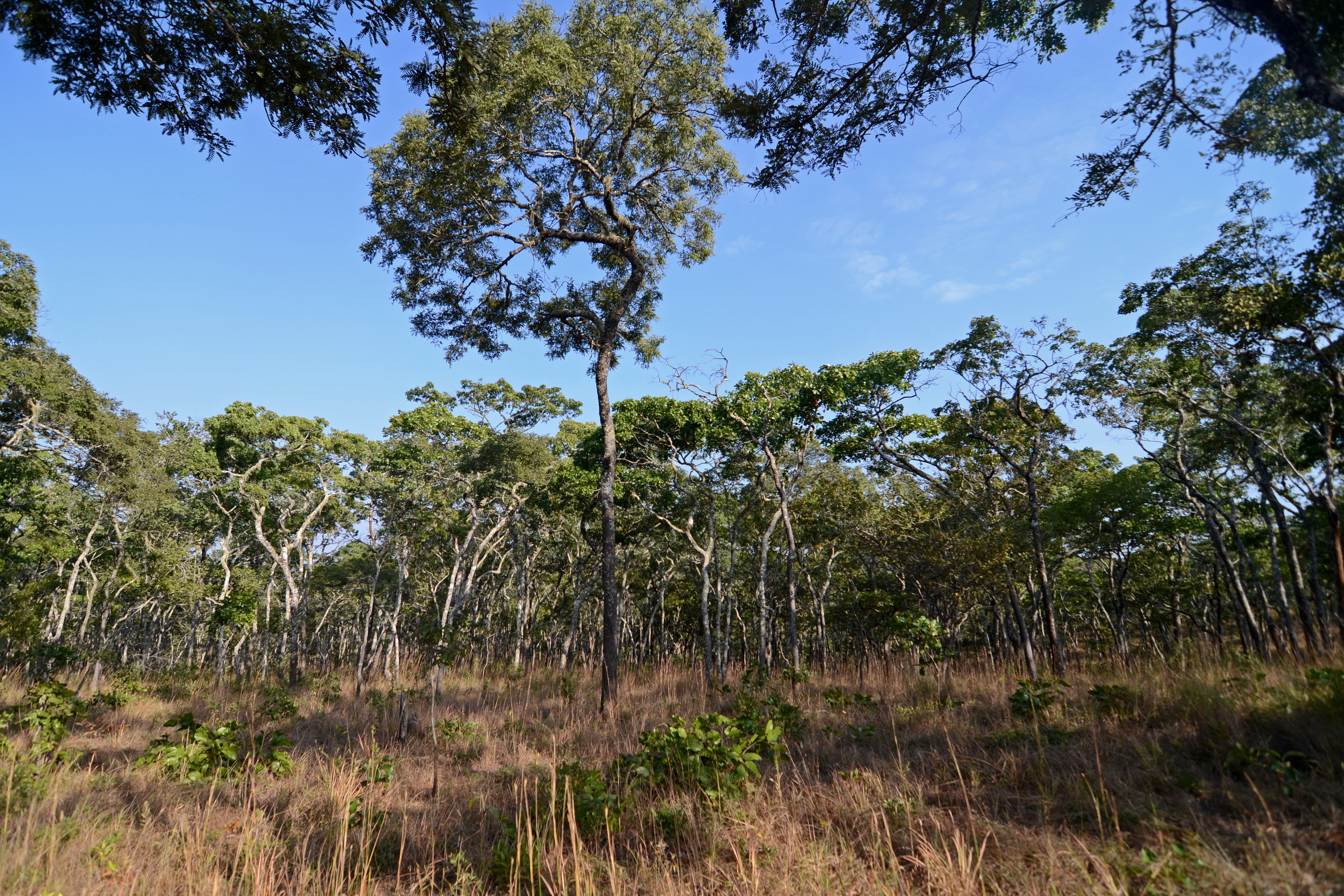
Central Zambezian miombo woodlands, a tropical savannah

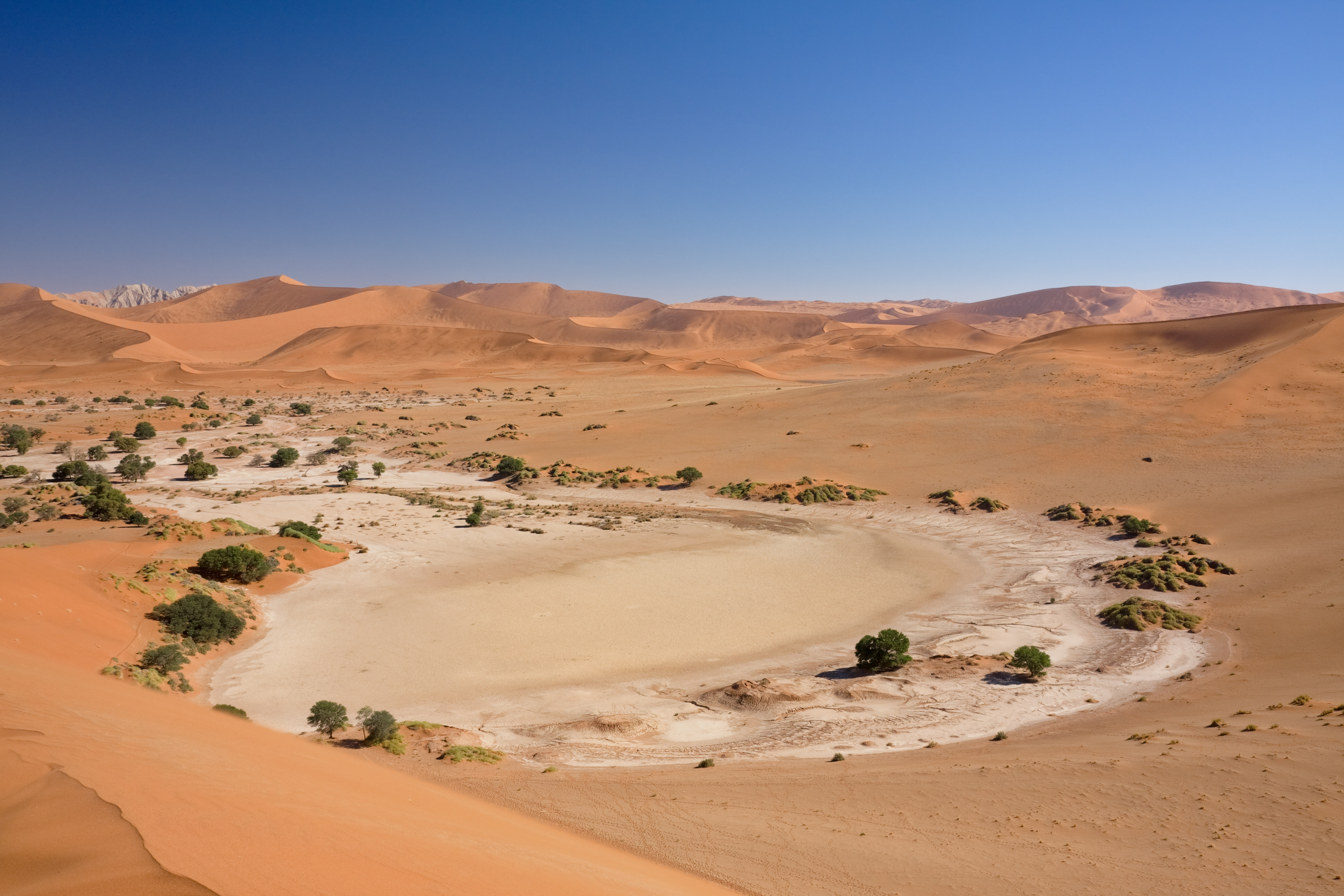
The Namib, a warm desert

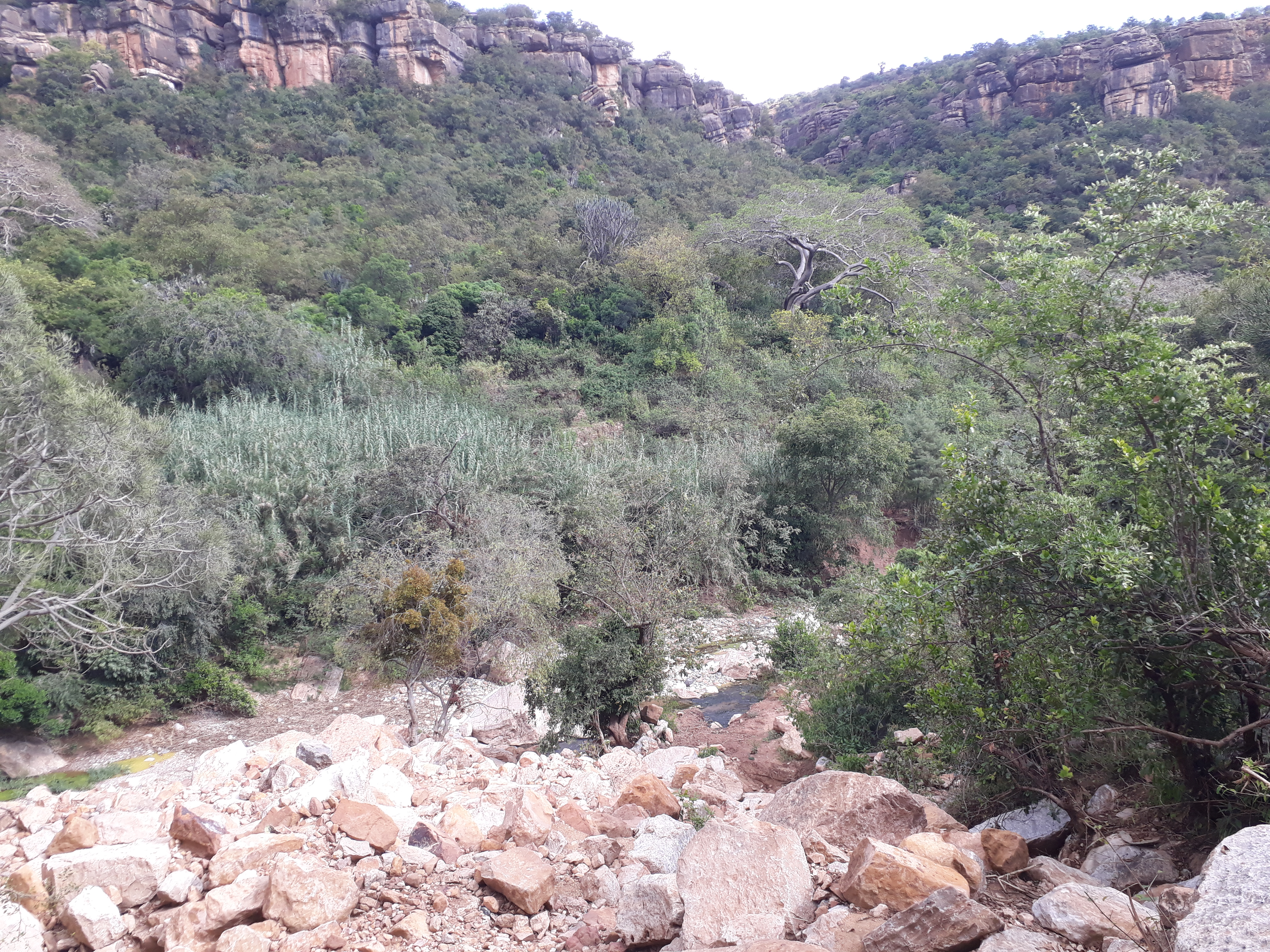
Ethiopian Highlands montane forest

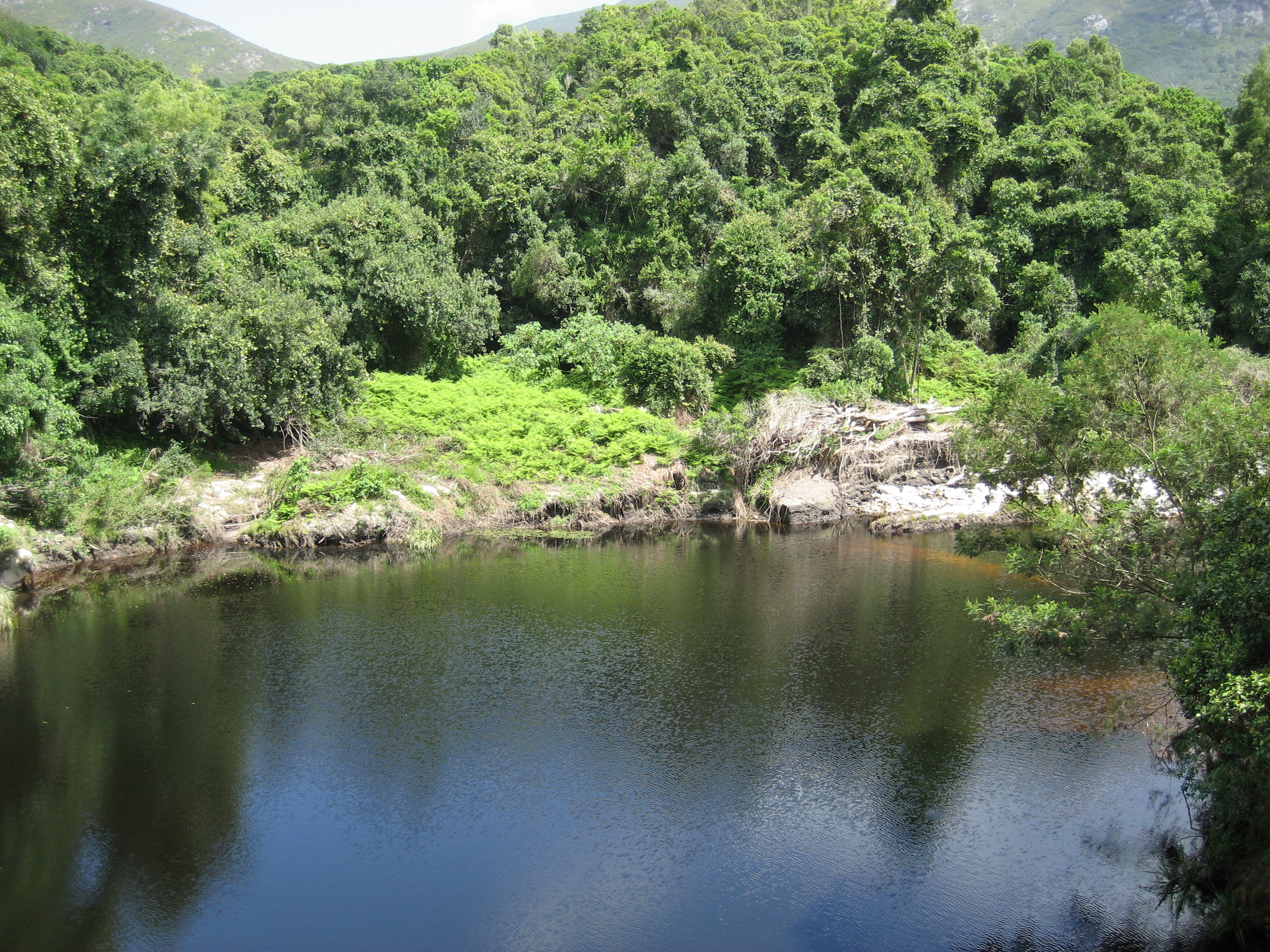
Wilderness National Park, an evergreen sclerophyllous woodland

== Antarctic Realm ==
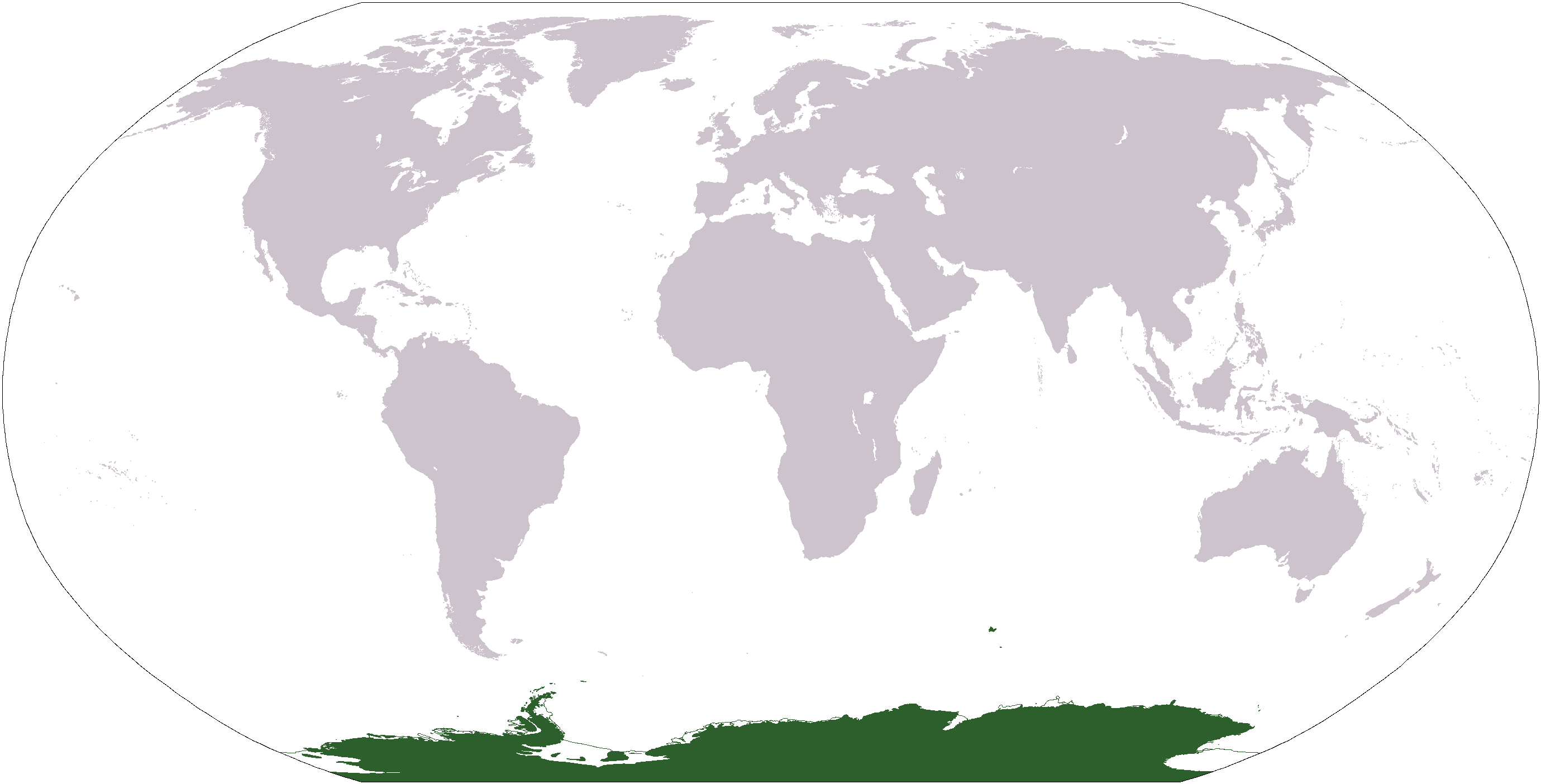
The Antarctic biogeographic realm (New Zealand is included in Udvardy's interpretation, which is known as Neozealandia)

- Tundra communities and barren Antarctic desert
- Subtropical and temperate rain forests or woodlands
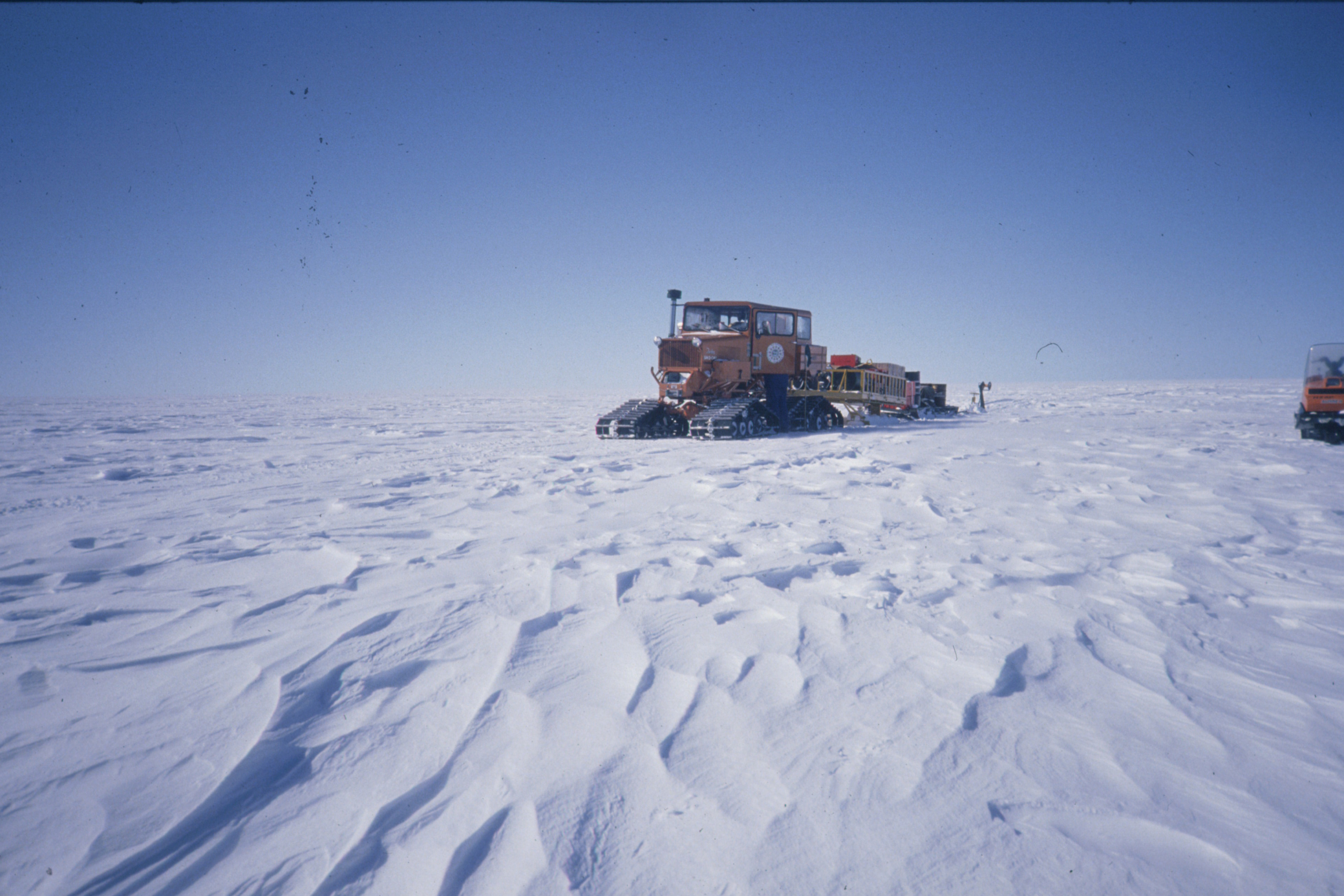
Amundsen–Scott South Pole Station, an Antarctic desert

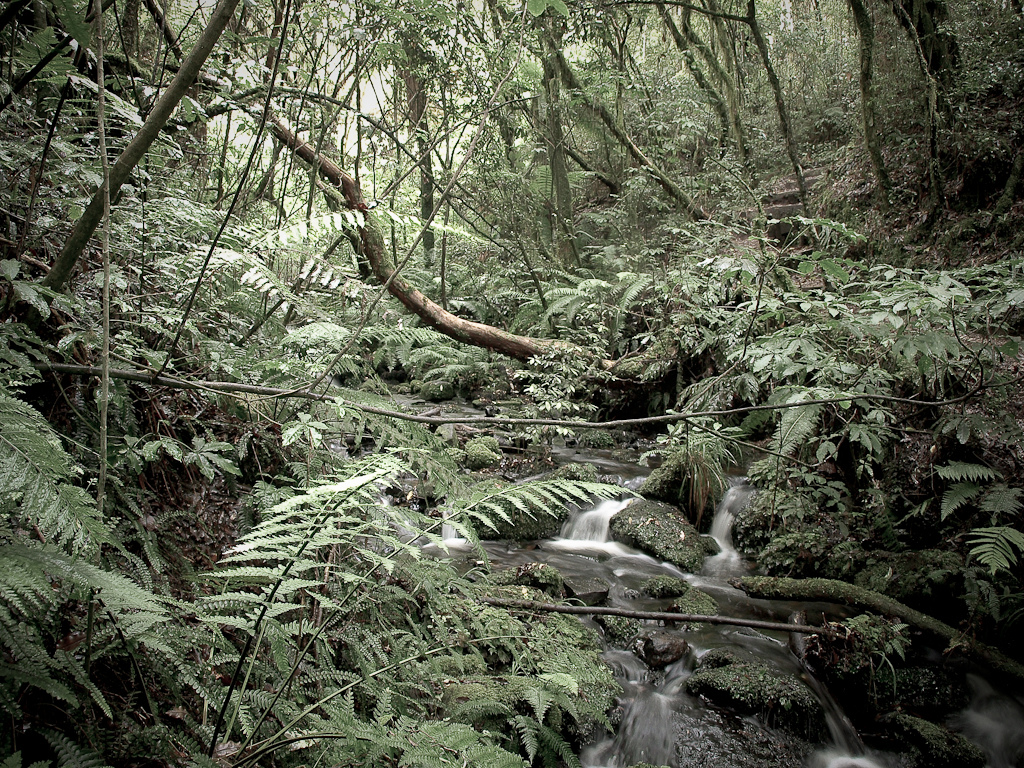
Pureora Forest Park, a subtropical rainforest in the North Island

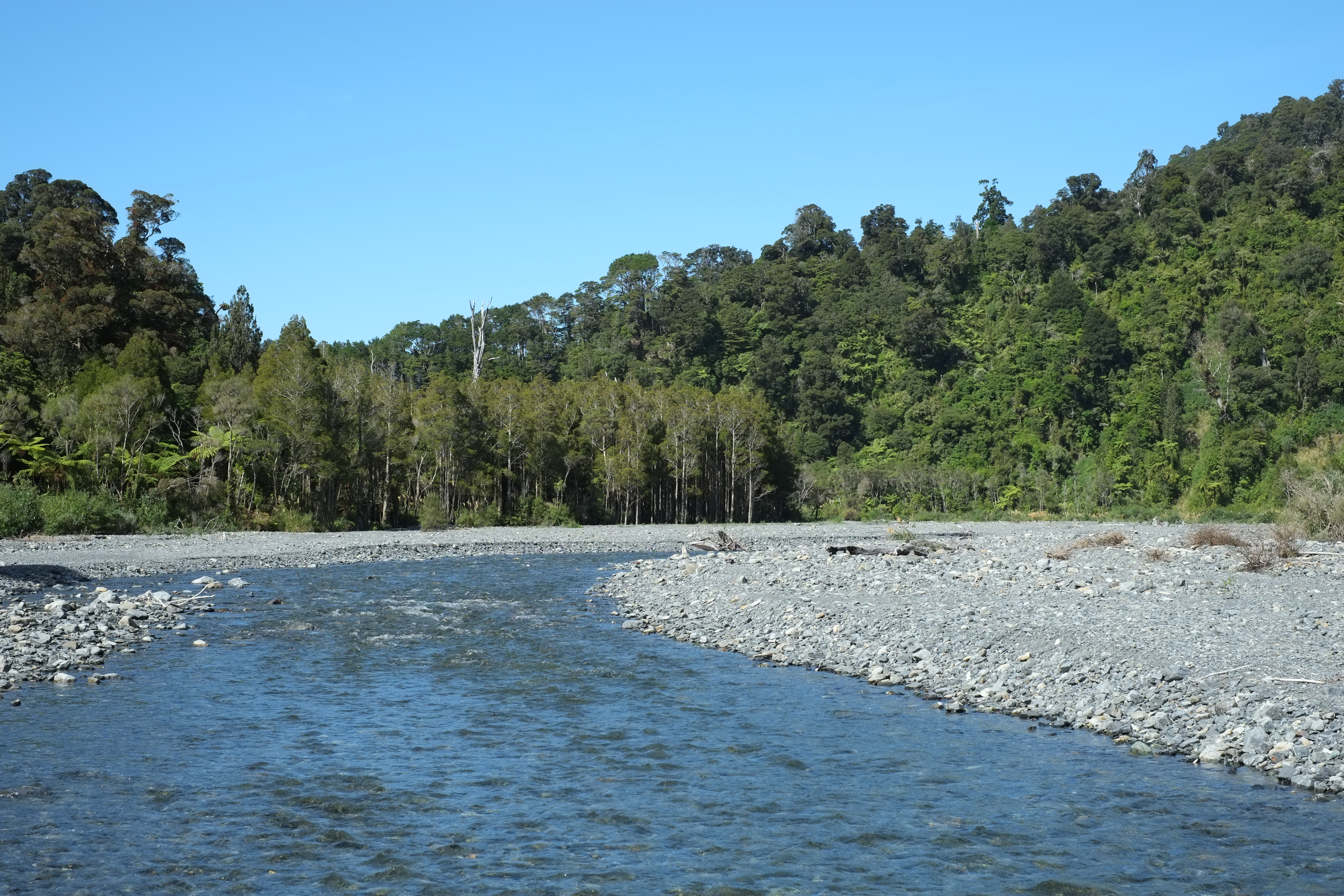
Remutaka Forest Park, a temperate woodland in the North Island

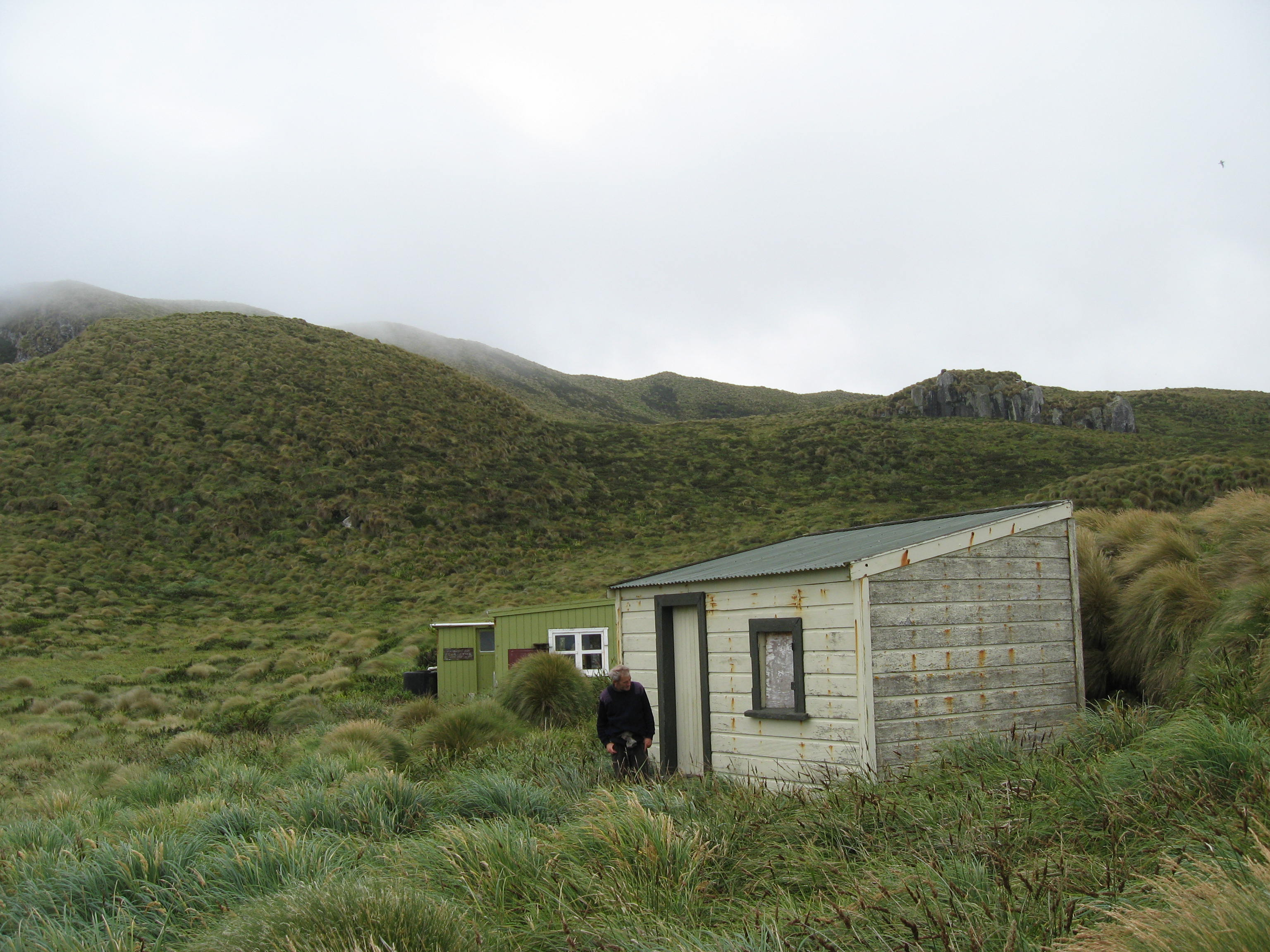
Antipodes Subantarctic Islands tundra, a tundra community

== Australasian Realm ==
Ecoregions of the Australasian realm, color-coded by biome. Udvardy's model excludes the South Pacific islands, such as New Guinea and New Zealand, aka Neozealandia. This realm has 10 of 14 biomes, or major habitat types, as defined by Olson & Dinerstein, et al. (2001).: 01. Tropical and subtropical moist broadleaf forests; 02. Tropical and subtropical dry broadleaf forests; 03. Tropical and subtropical coniferous forests; 04. Temperate broadleaf and mixed forests; 05. Temperate coniferous forests; 06. Taiga and Boreal forest; 07. Tropical and subtropical grasslands, savannas, and shrublands; 08. Temperate grasslands, savannas, and shrublands; 09. Flooded grasslands and savannas; 10. Montane grasslands and shrublands; 11. Tundra; 12. Mediterranean forests, woodlands, and scrub; 13. Deserts and xeric shrublands; 14. Mangroves; Rock and Ice, or Abiotic Land Zones

- Tropical humid forests
  - Queensland Coastal
- Subtropical and temperate rain forests or woodlands
  - Tasmanian
- Tropical dry or deciduous forests (incl. Monsoon forests) or woodlands
  - Northern Coastal
- Evergreen sclerophyllous forests, scrubs or woodlands
  - Western Sclerophyll
  - Eastern Sclerophyll
  - Brigalow
- Warm deserts and semideserts
  - Western Mulga
  - Central Desert
  - Southern Mulga/Saltbush
- Tropical grasslands and savannas
  - Northern Savanna
  - Northern Grasslands
- Temperate grasslands
  - Eastern Grasslands and Savannas
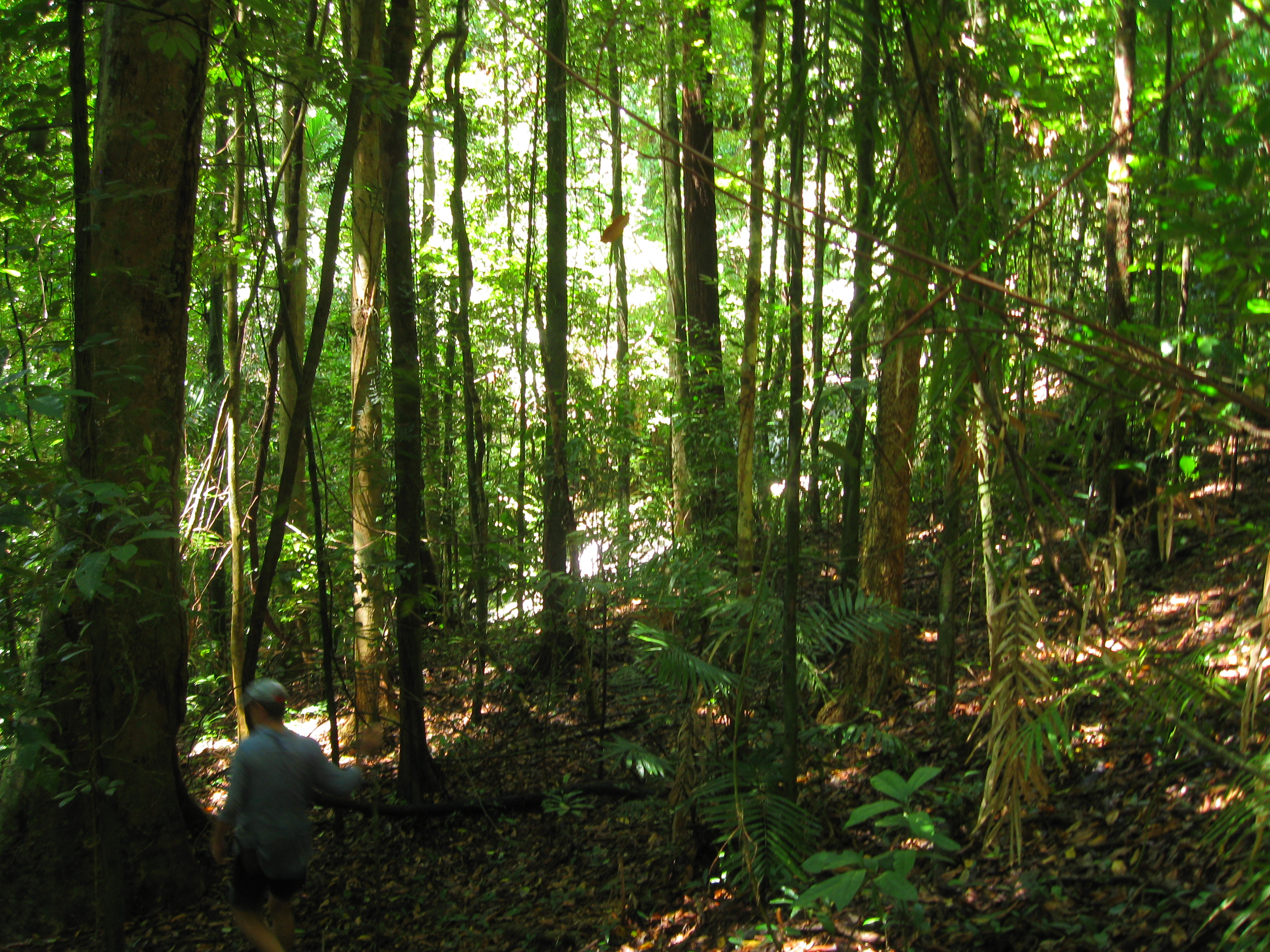
Daintree rainforest, a tropical humid forest

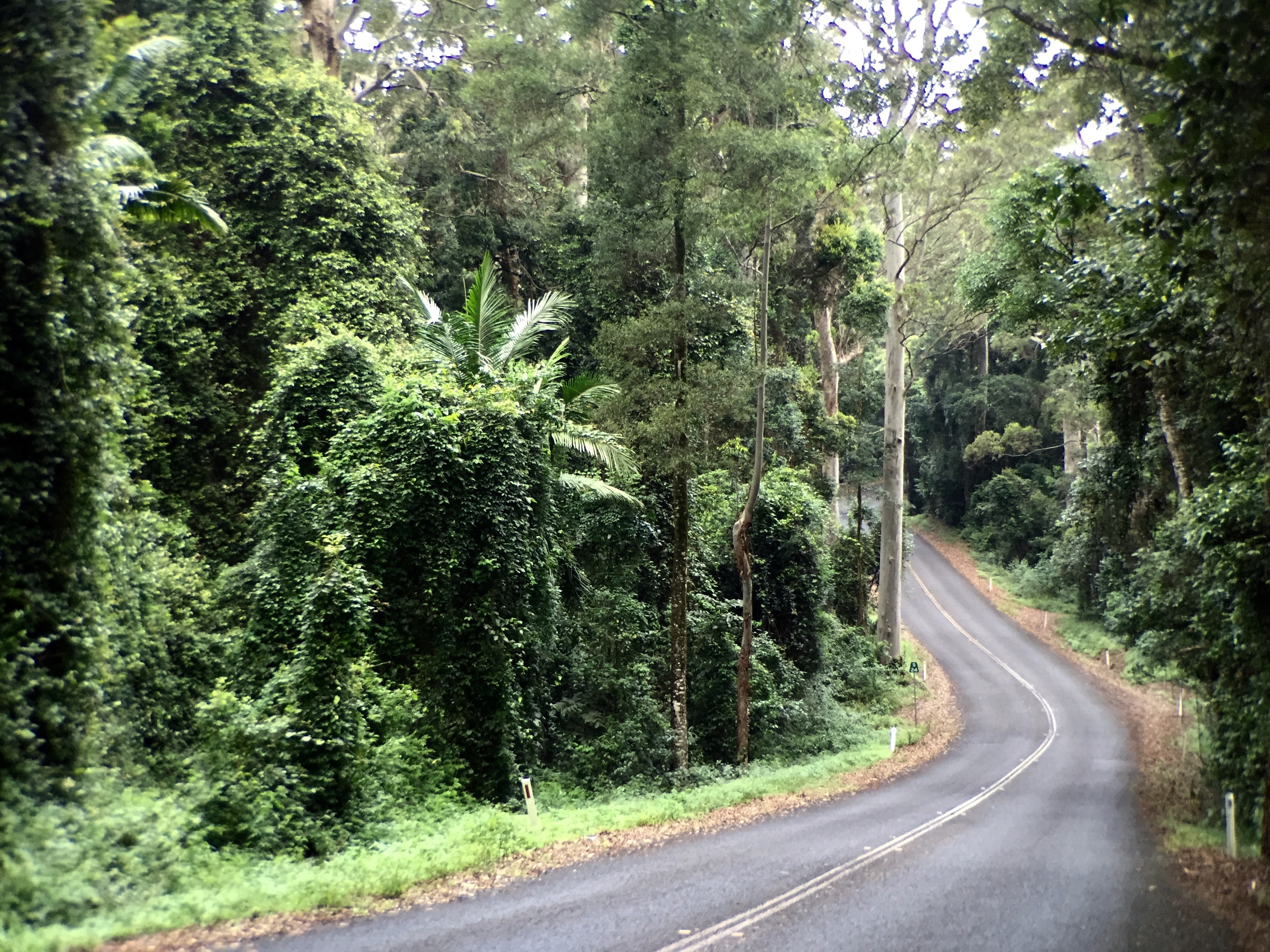
D'Aguilar National Park, a subtropical forest

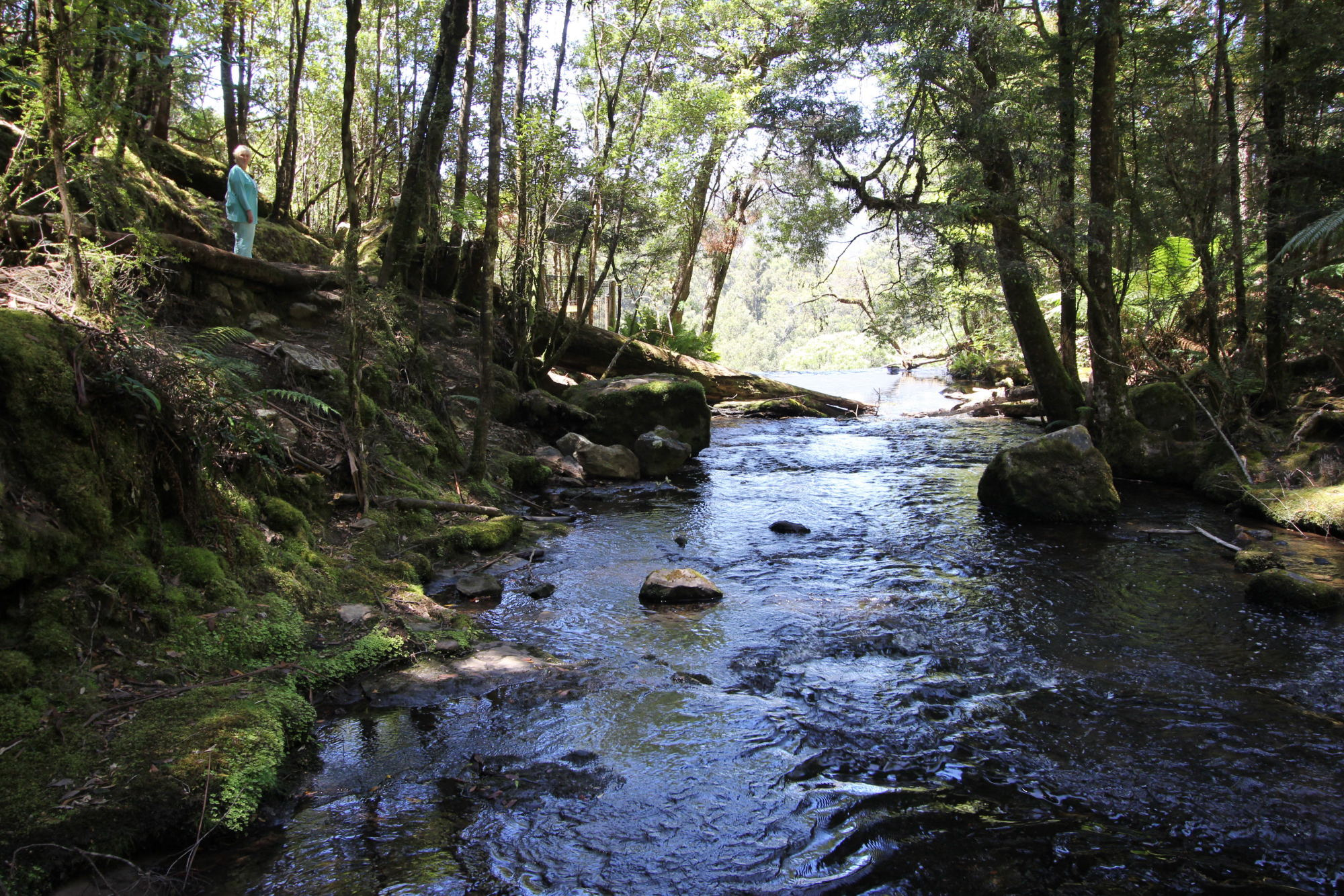
Mount Field National Park, a temperate forest

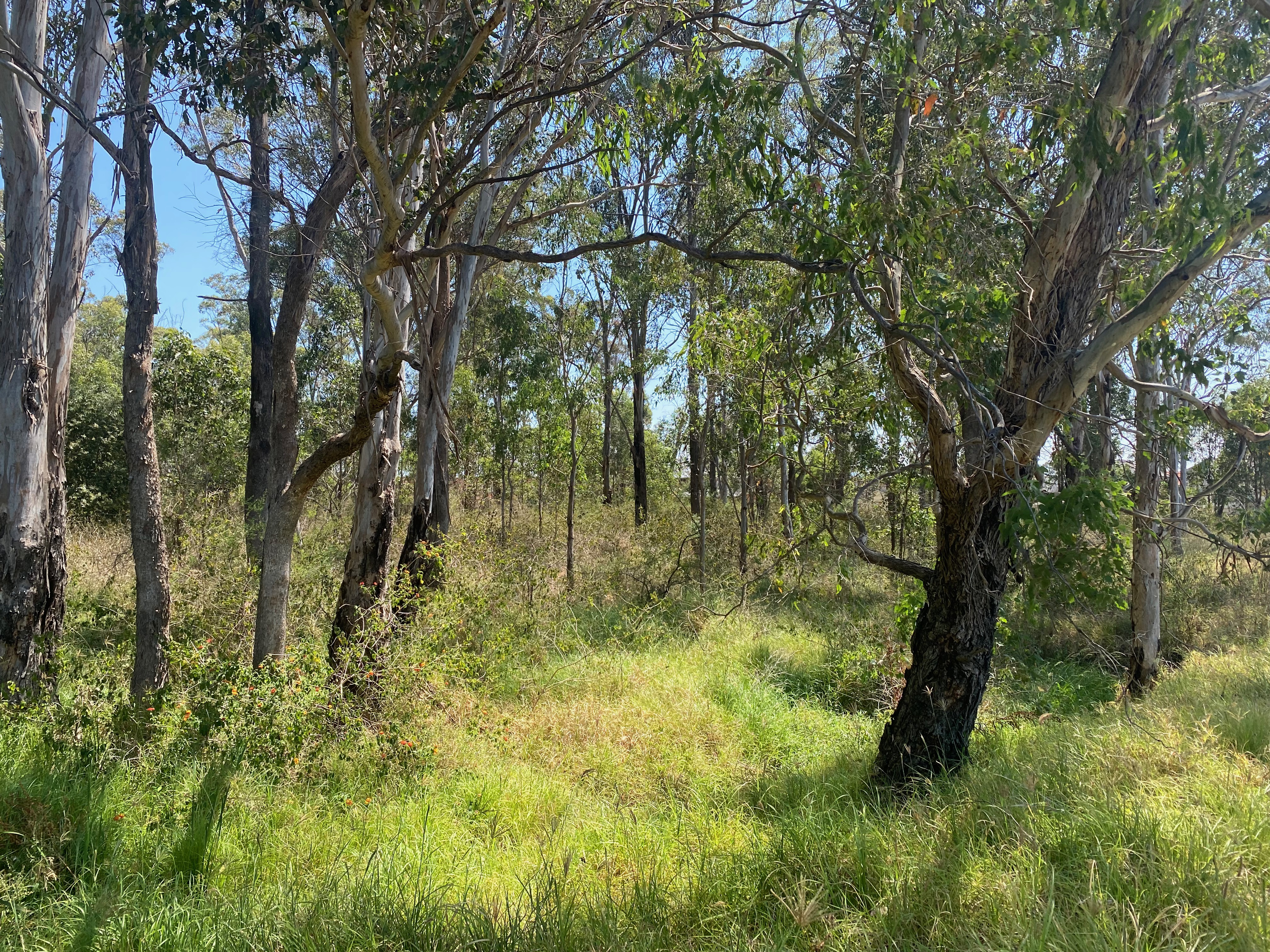
Cumberland Plain Woodland, an evergreen sclerophyllous woodland-savannah

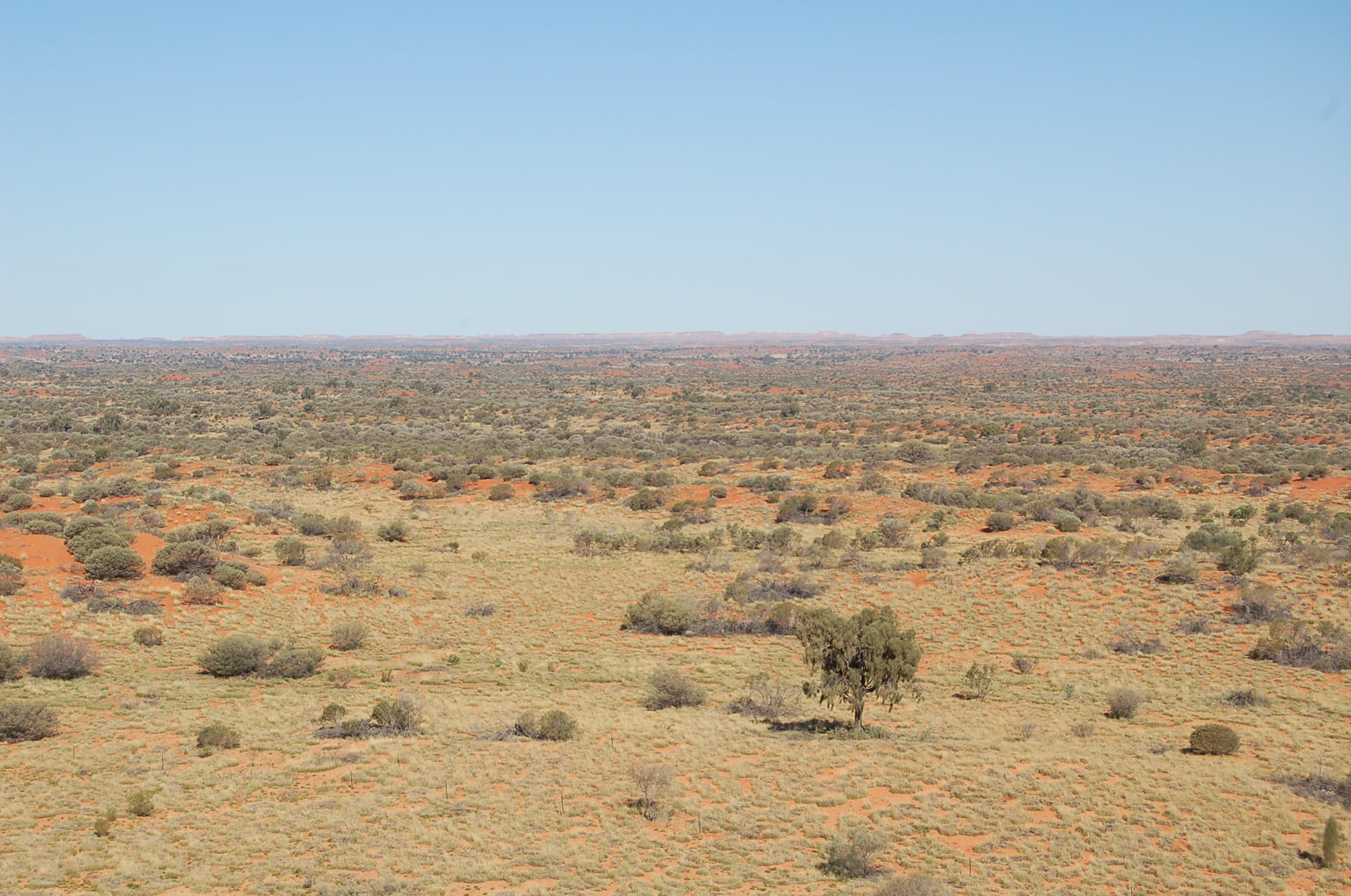
Simpson Desert, a warm desert

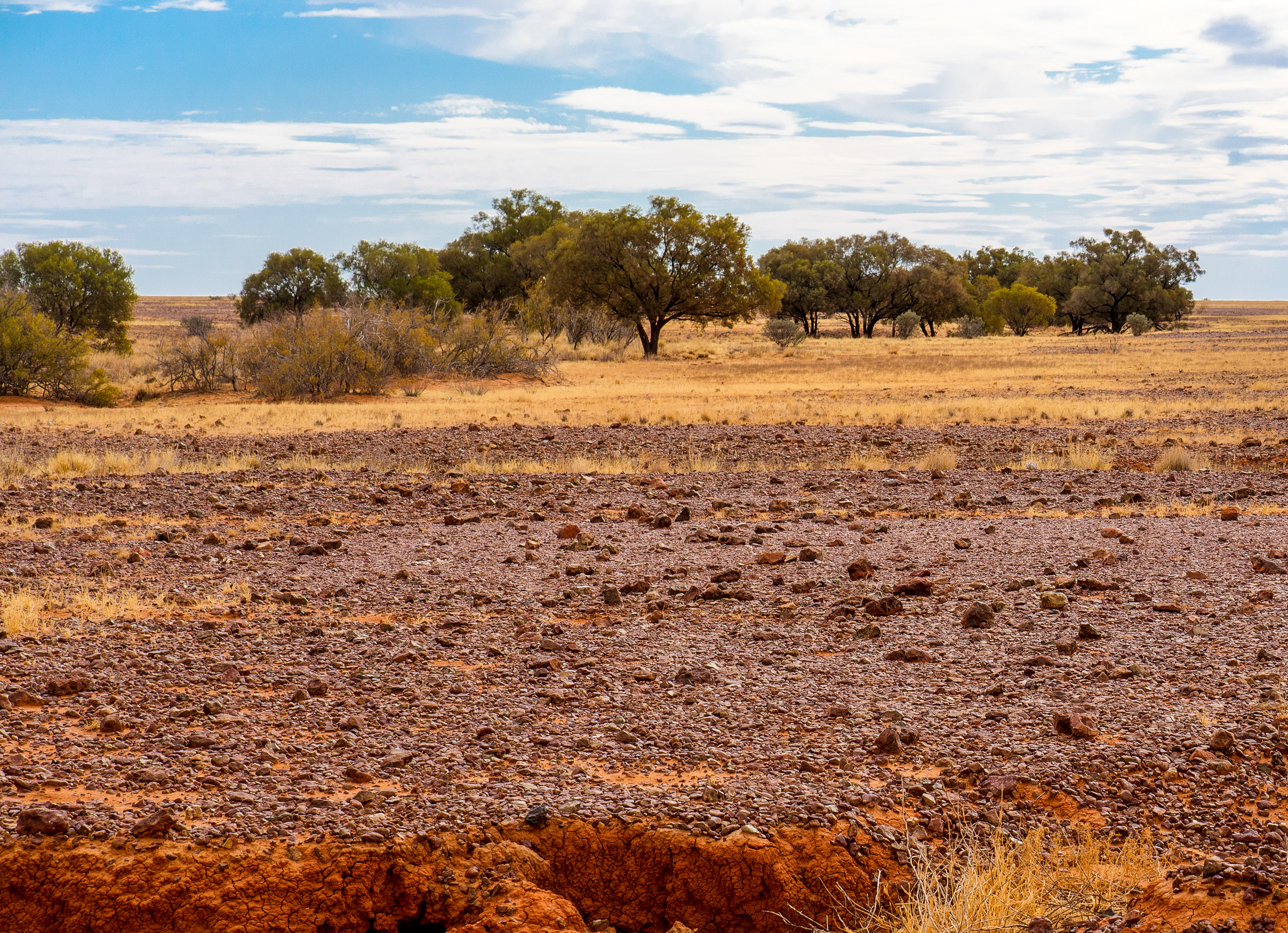
Diamantina National Park, a tropical grassland/savannah

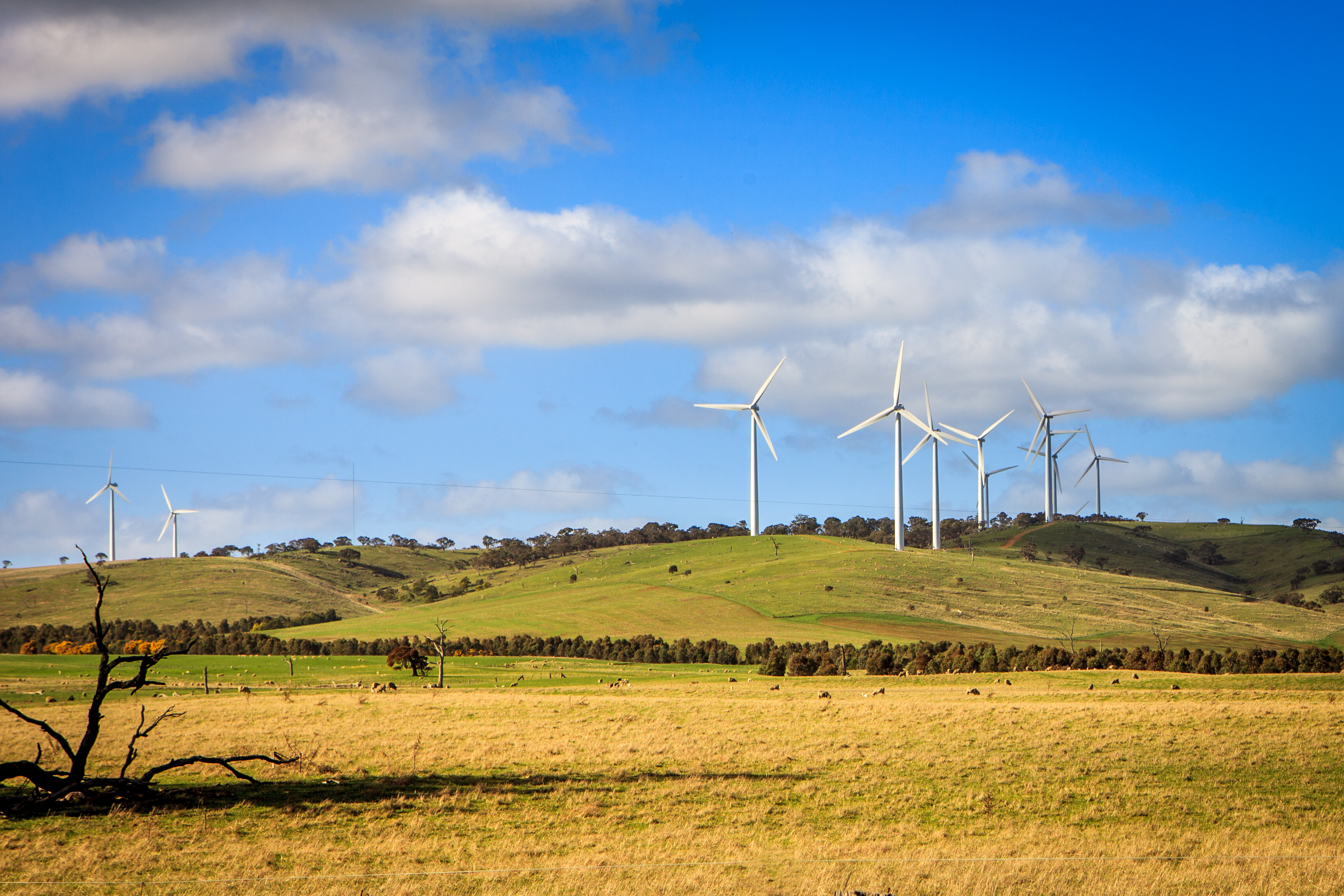
Challicum Hills Wind Farm, a temperate grassland

== Indomalayan Realm ==
Ecoregions of the Indomalayan realm, color-coded by biome. This realm has 9 of 14 biomes, or major habitat types, as defined by Olson & Dinerstein, et al. (2001).: 01. Tropical and subtropical moist broadleaf forests; 02. Tropical and subtropical dry broadleaf forests; 03. Tropical and subtropical coniferous forests; 04. Temperate broadleaf and mixed forests; 05. Temperate coniferous forests; 06. Taiga and Boreal forest; 07. Tropical and subtropical grasslands, savannas, and shrublands; 08. Temperate grasslands, savannas, and shrublands; 09. Flooded grasslands and savannas; 10. Montane grasslands and shrublands; 11. Tundra; 12. Mediterranean forests, woodlands, and scrub; 13. Deserts and xeric shrublands; 14. Mangroves; Rock and Ice, or Abiotic Land Zones

- Tropical humid forests
  - Malabar Rainforest
  - Ceylonese Rainforest
  - Bengalian Rainforest
  - Indo-Burman Rainforest (including Meghalaya subtropical forests)
  - Indochinese Rainforest
  - South Chinese Rainforest
  - Malayan Rainforest
  - Himalayan Subtropical Rainforests (including Himalayan subtropical broadleaf forests and Margalla Hills)
- Tropical dry or deciduous forests (incl. Monsoon forests) or woodlands
  - Indus-Ganges Monsoon Forest
  - Burman Monsoon Forest
  - Thai Monsoon Forest
  - Mahanadian
  - Coromandel
  - Ceylonese Monsoon Forest
  - Deccan Thorn Forest
- Warm deserts and semideserts
  - Thar Desert
- Mixed island systems
  - Seychelles and Amirantes Islands
  - Laccadives Islands
  - Maldives and Chagos Islands
  - Cocos-Keeling and Christmas Islands
  - Andaman and Nicobar Islands
  - Sumatra
  - Java
  - Lesser Sunda Islands
  - Celebes
  - Borneo
  - Philippines
  - Taiwan
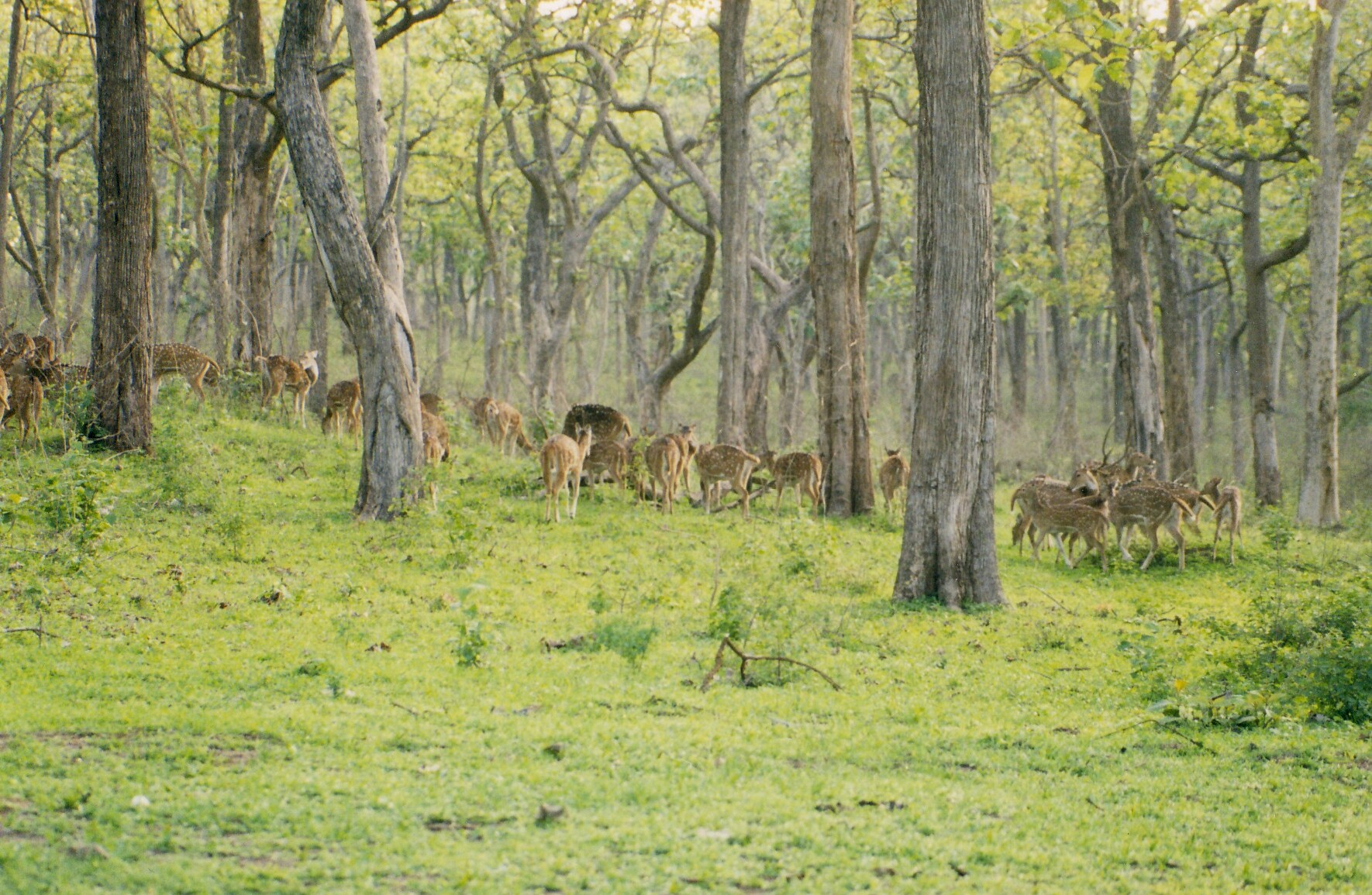
South Western Ghats moist deciduous forests, a tropical humid forest

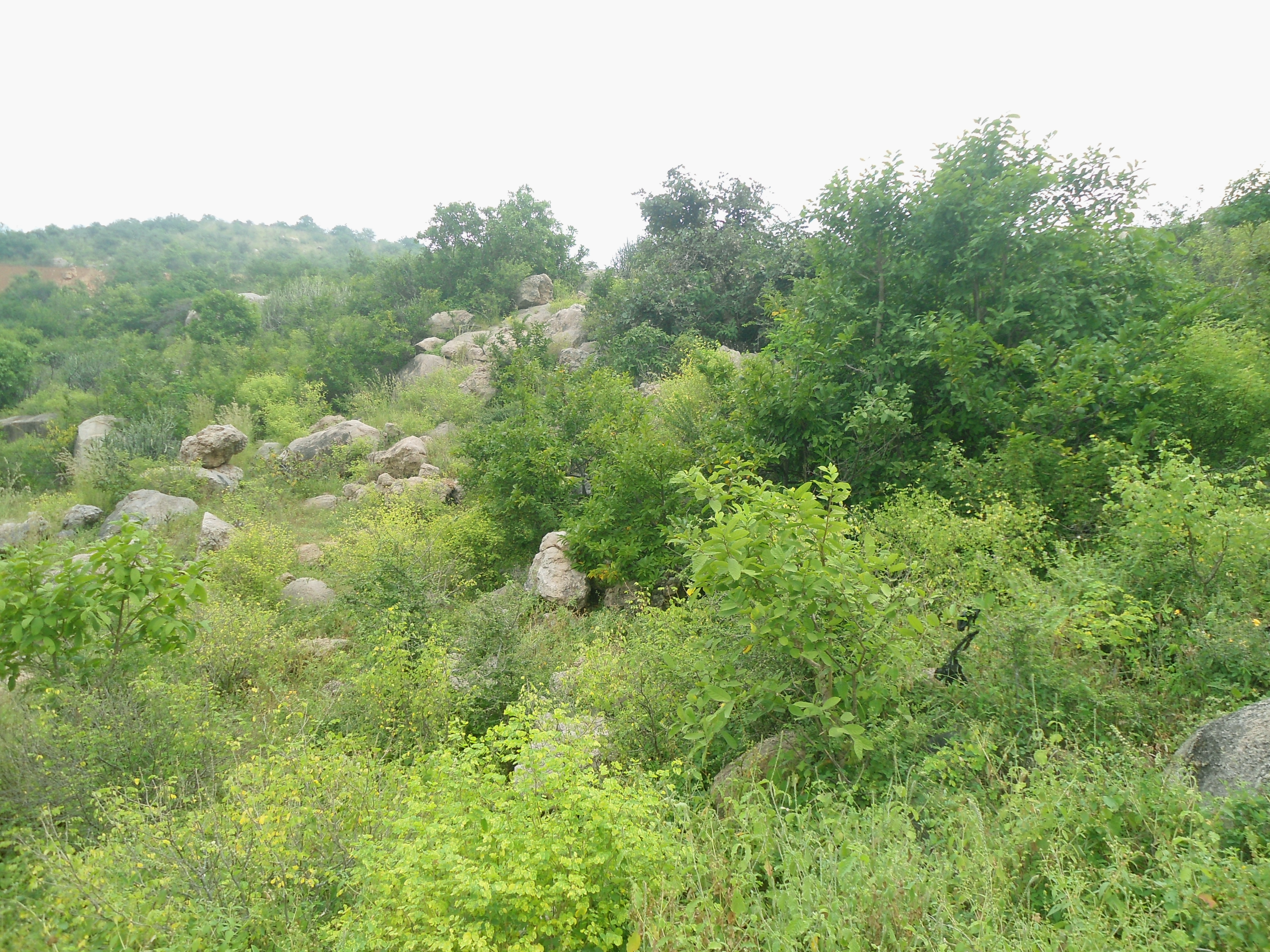
Deccan thorn scrub forests, a tropical dry woodland

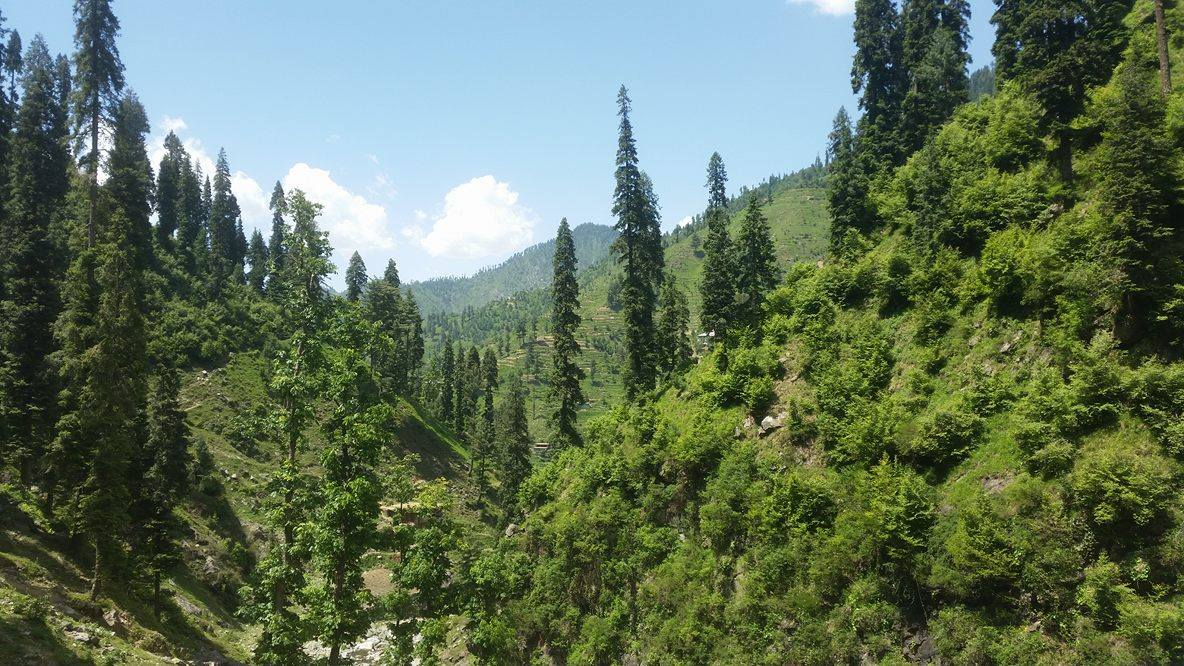
Swat valley, a temperate forest

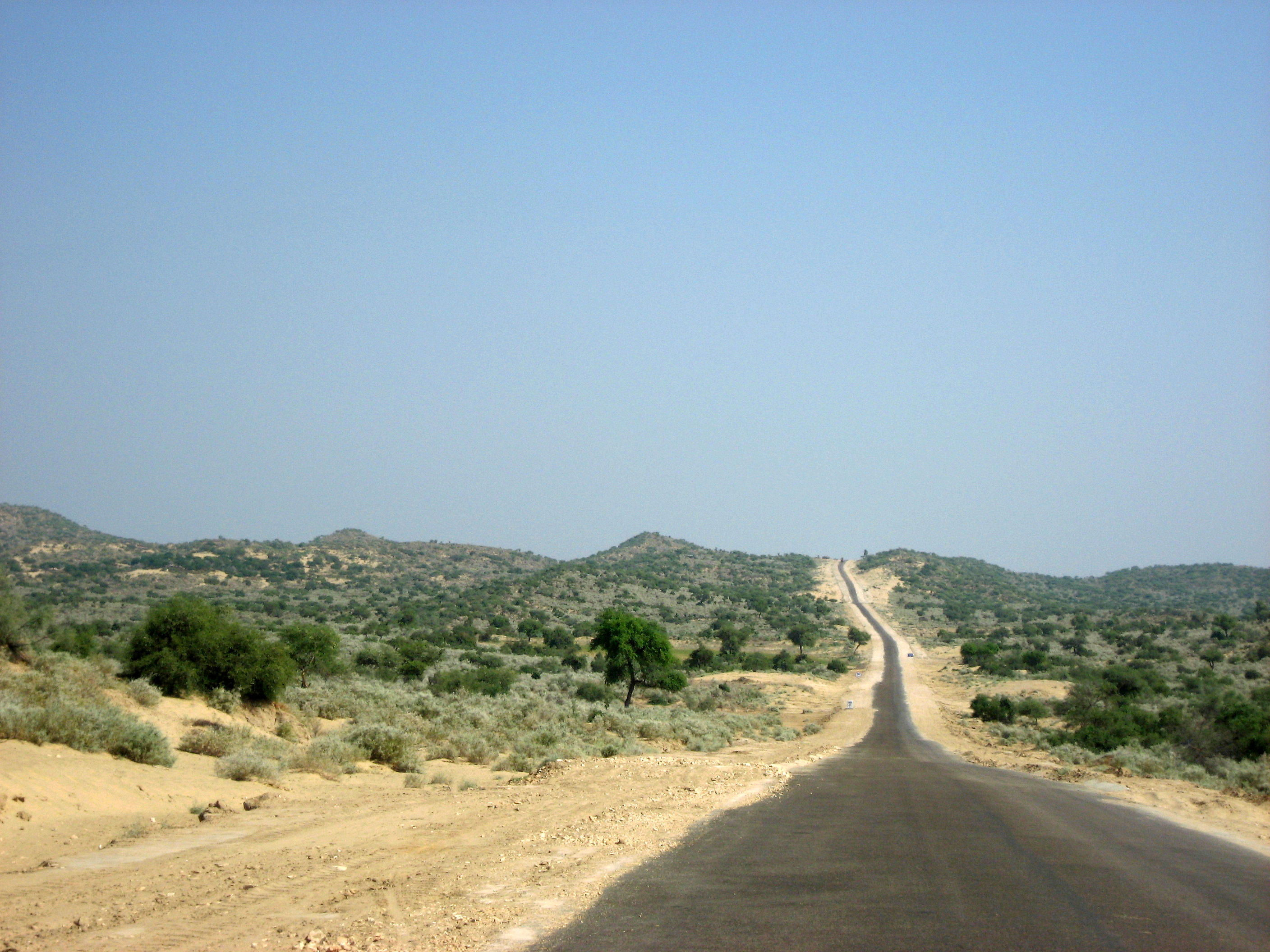
Thar Desert, a hot desert

== Nearctic Realm ==
The Nearctic realm

- Subtropical and temperate rain forests or woodlands
  - Sitkan
  - Oregonian
- Temperate needle-leaf forests or woodlands
  - Yukon Taiga
  - Canadian Taiga
- Temperate broad-leaf forests or woodlands, and subpolar deciduous thickets
  - Eastern Forest
  - Austroriparian
- Evergreen sclerophyllous forests, scrubs or woodlands
  - Californian
- Warm deserts and semideserts
  - Sonoran
  - Chihuahuan
  - Tamaulipan
- Cold-winter (continental) deserts and semideserts
  - Great Basin
- Tundra communities and barren Arctic desert
  - Aleutian Islands
  - Alaskan Tundra
  - Canadian Tundra
  - Arctic Archipelago
  - Greenland Tundra
  - Arctic Desert and Icecap
- Temperate grasslands
  - Grasslands
- Mixed mountain and highland systems with complex zonation
  - Rocky Mountains
  - Sierra-Cascade
  - Madrean-Cordilleran
- Lake systems
  - Great Lakes
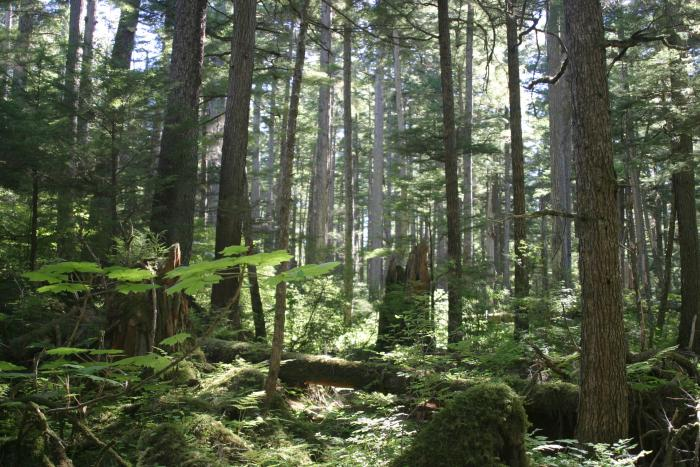
Northern Pacific coastal forests, a temperate evergreen rainforest

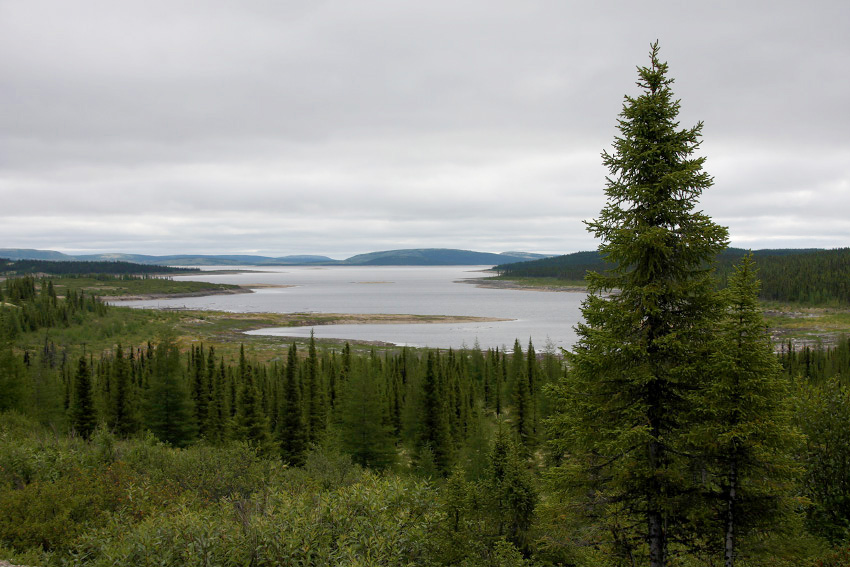
Eastern Canadian Shield taiga, a temperate needleleaf forest

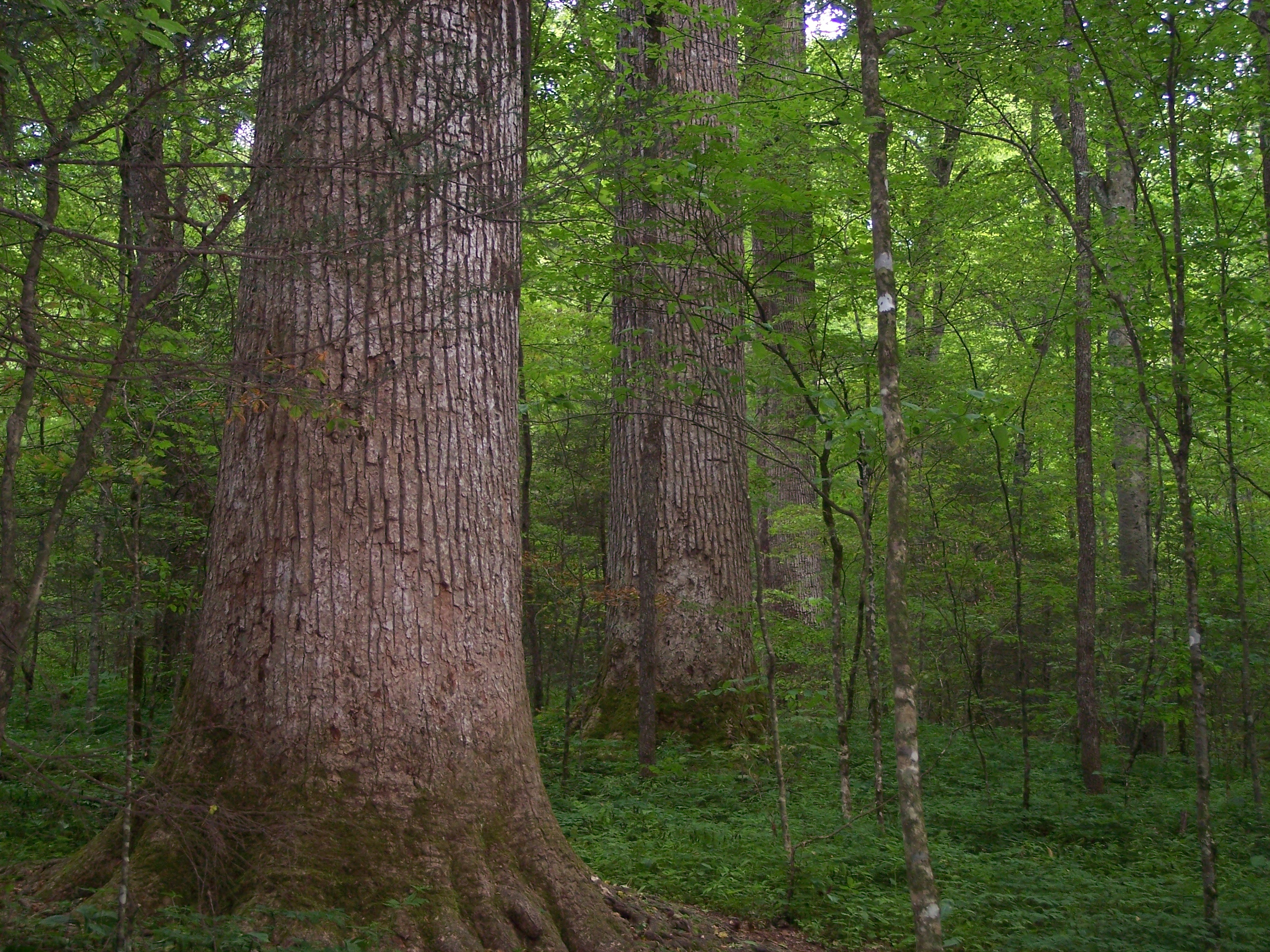
Mount Field National Park, a temperate deciduous rainforest

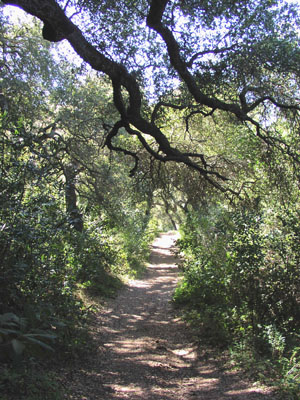
California oak woodland, a sclerophyllous woodland

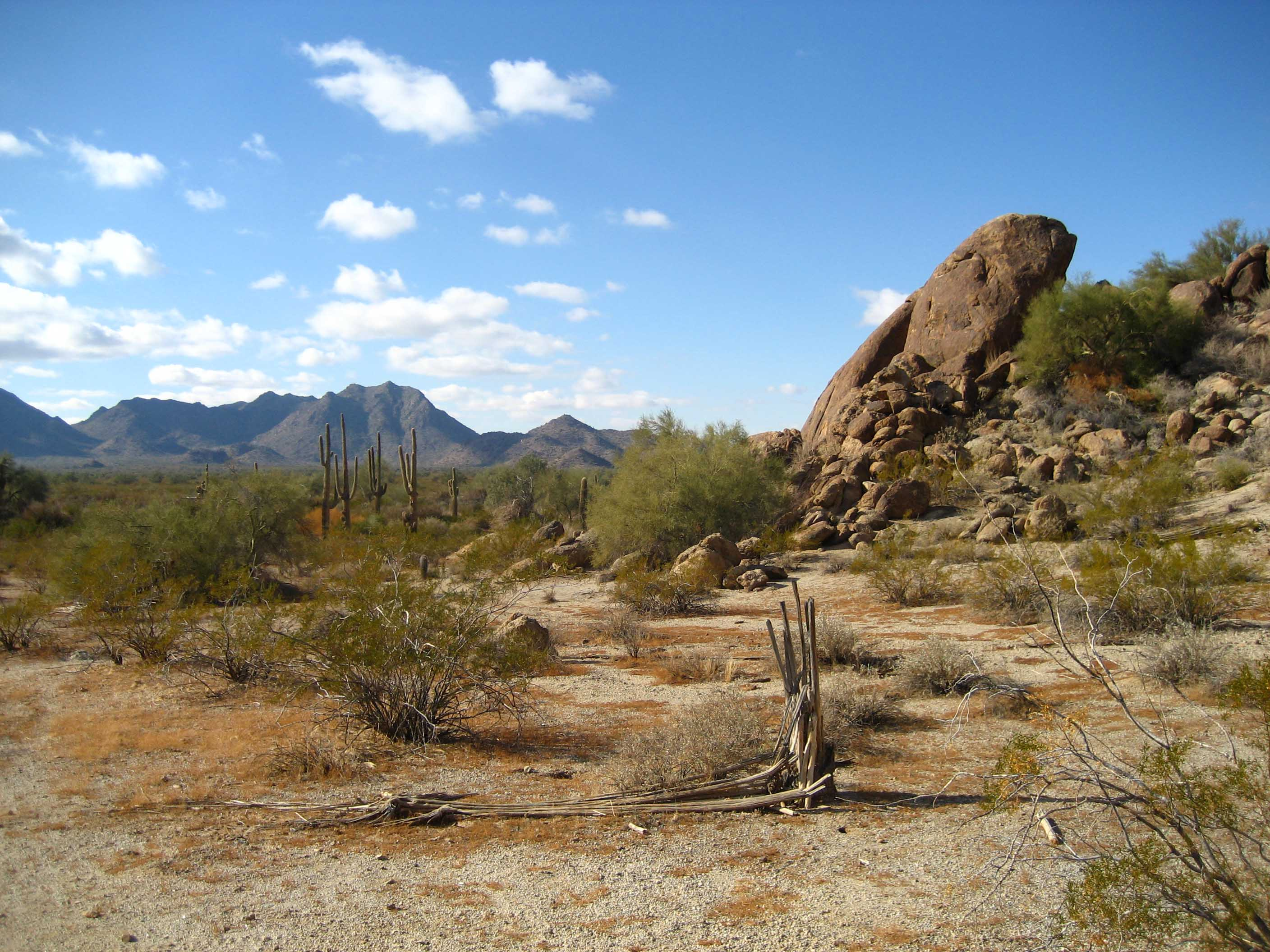
Maricopa, Arizona, a warm desert

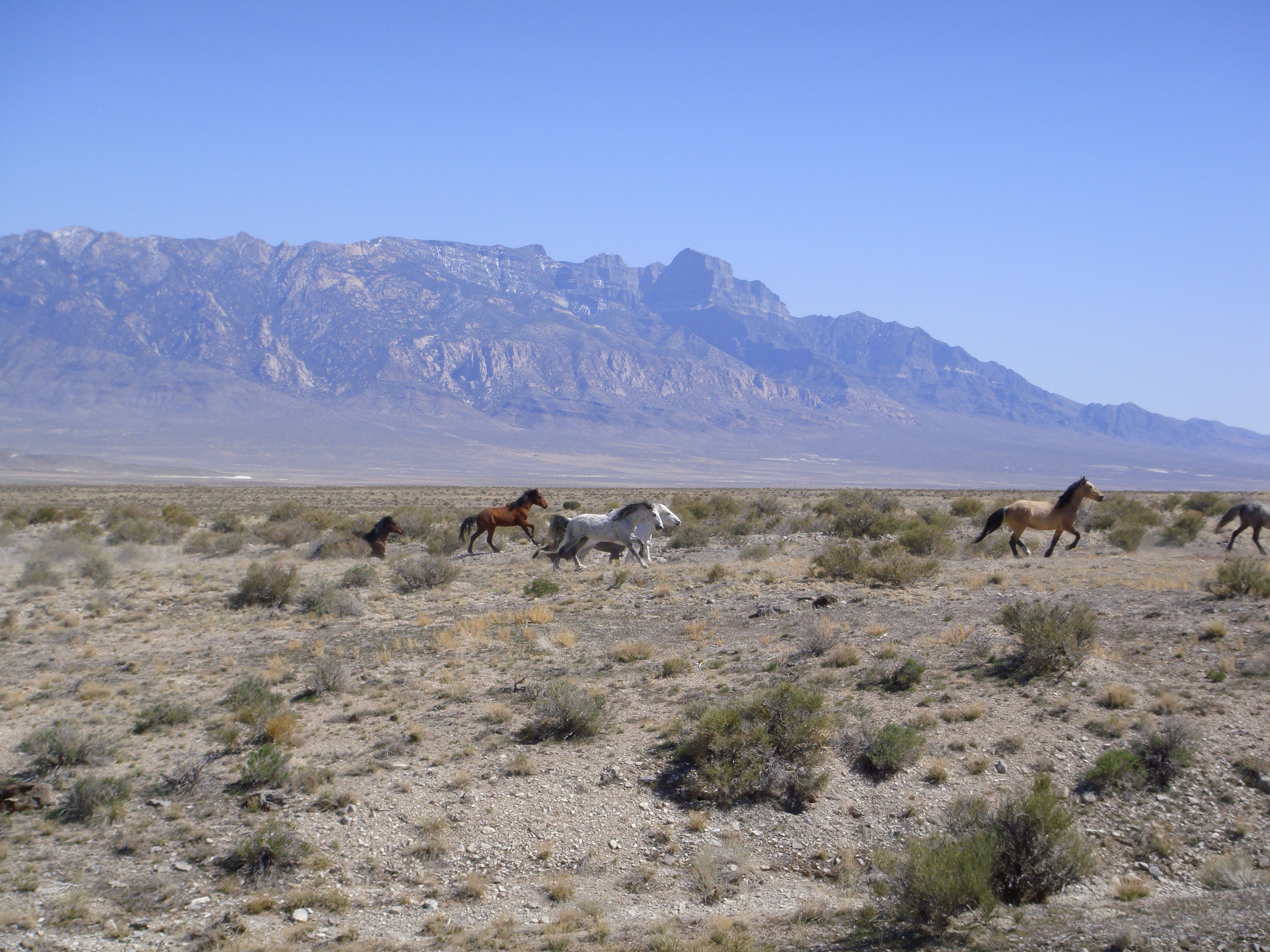
Tule Valley, a cold semi-desert

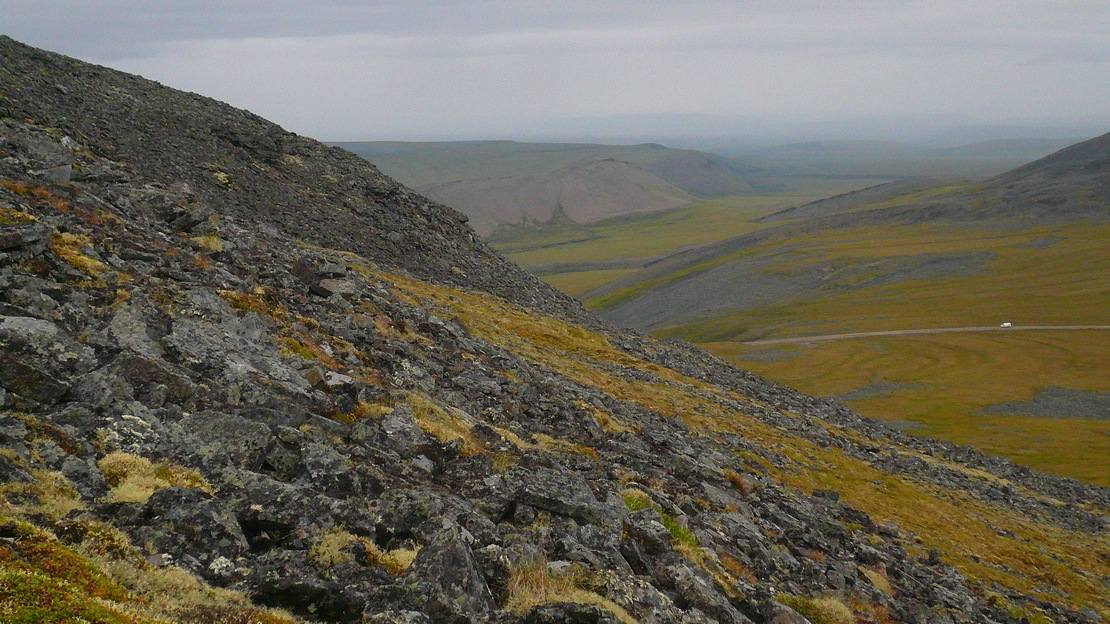
Richardson Mountains, a tundra community

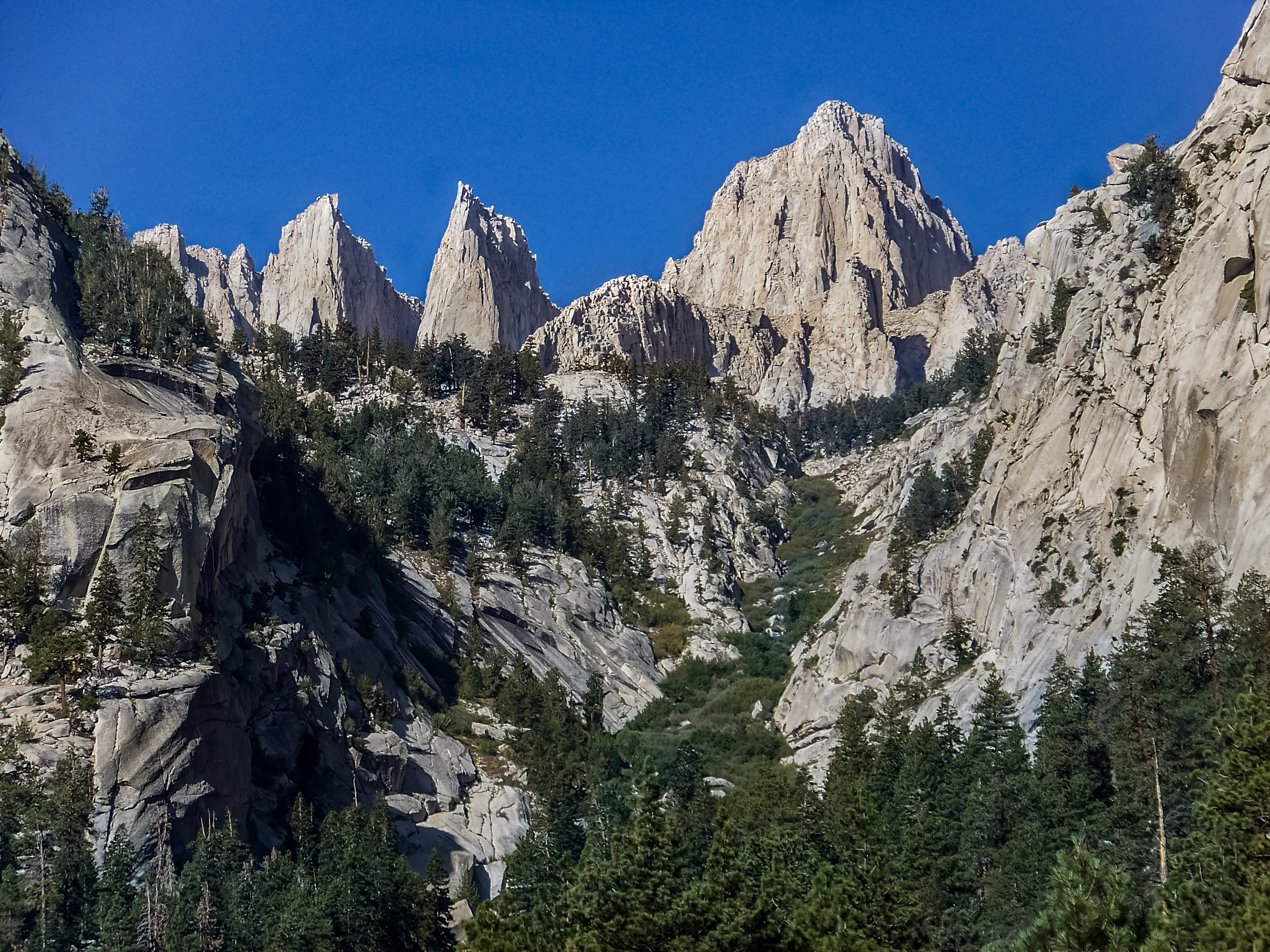
Mount Whitney, a mixed mountain and highland system

== Neotropical Realm ==
Ecoregions of the Neotropical realm, each of a colored biome. This realm has 11 of 14 biomes, or major habitat types, as defined by Olson & Dinerstein, et al. (2001).: 01. Tropical and subtropical moist broadleaf forests; 02. Tropical and subtropical dry broadleaf forests; 03. Tropical and subtropical coniferous forests; 04. Temperate broadleaf and mixed forests; 05. Temperate coniferous forests; 06. Taiga and Boreal forest; 07. Tropical and subtropical grasslands, savannas, and shrublands; 08. Temperate grasslands, savannas, and shrublands; 09. Flooded grasslands and savannas; 10. Montane grasslands and shrublands; 11. Tundra; 12. Mediterranean forests, woodlands, and scrub; 13. Deserts and xeric shrublands; 14. Mangroves; Rock and Ice, or Abiotic Land Zones

The Neotropical Realm has been divided into between 20 and 40 provinces by various authors. Such provinces include:

- Tropical humid forests
  - Amazon rainforest
  - Atlantic Forest
  - Campechean
  - Colombian Coastal
  - Madeiran
  - Panamanian
- Subtropical and temperate rain forests or woodlands
  - Magellanic subpolar forests
  - Valdivian Forest (Chilean Temperate Rain Forest)
- Tropical dry or deciduous forests (incl. Monsoon forests) or woodlands
  - Central American (Carib-Pacific)
- Temperate broad-leaf forests or woodlands, and subpolar deciduous thickets
  - Chilean Araucaria Forest
- Evergreen sclerophyllous forests, scrubs or woodlands
  - Caatinga
  - Chilean Matorral
  - Gran Chaco
- Warm deserts and semideserts
  - Pacific Desert (Peruvian and Atacama Desert)
  - Monte (Argentinian Thorn-scrub)
- Cold-winter (continental) deserts and semideserts
  - Patagonia
- Tropical grasslands and savannas
  - Cerrado
  - Campos Limpos
  - Everglades
  - Llanos
  - Babacu
- Temperate grasslands
  - Pampas
  - Uruguayan savanna
- Mixed mountain and highland systems with complex zonation
  - Northern Andean
  - Colombian Montane
  - Yungas (Andean cloud forest)
  - Puna
  - Southern Andean
- Mixed island systems
  - Bahamas-Bermudan
  - Cuban
  - Greater Antillean (Jamaica, Hispaniola and Puerto Rico)
  - Lesser Antillean
  - Revillagigedo Archipelago
  - Cocos Island
  - Galapagos Islands
  - Fernando de Noronha Island
  - South Trindade Island
- Lake systems
  - Lake Titicaca
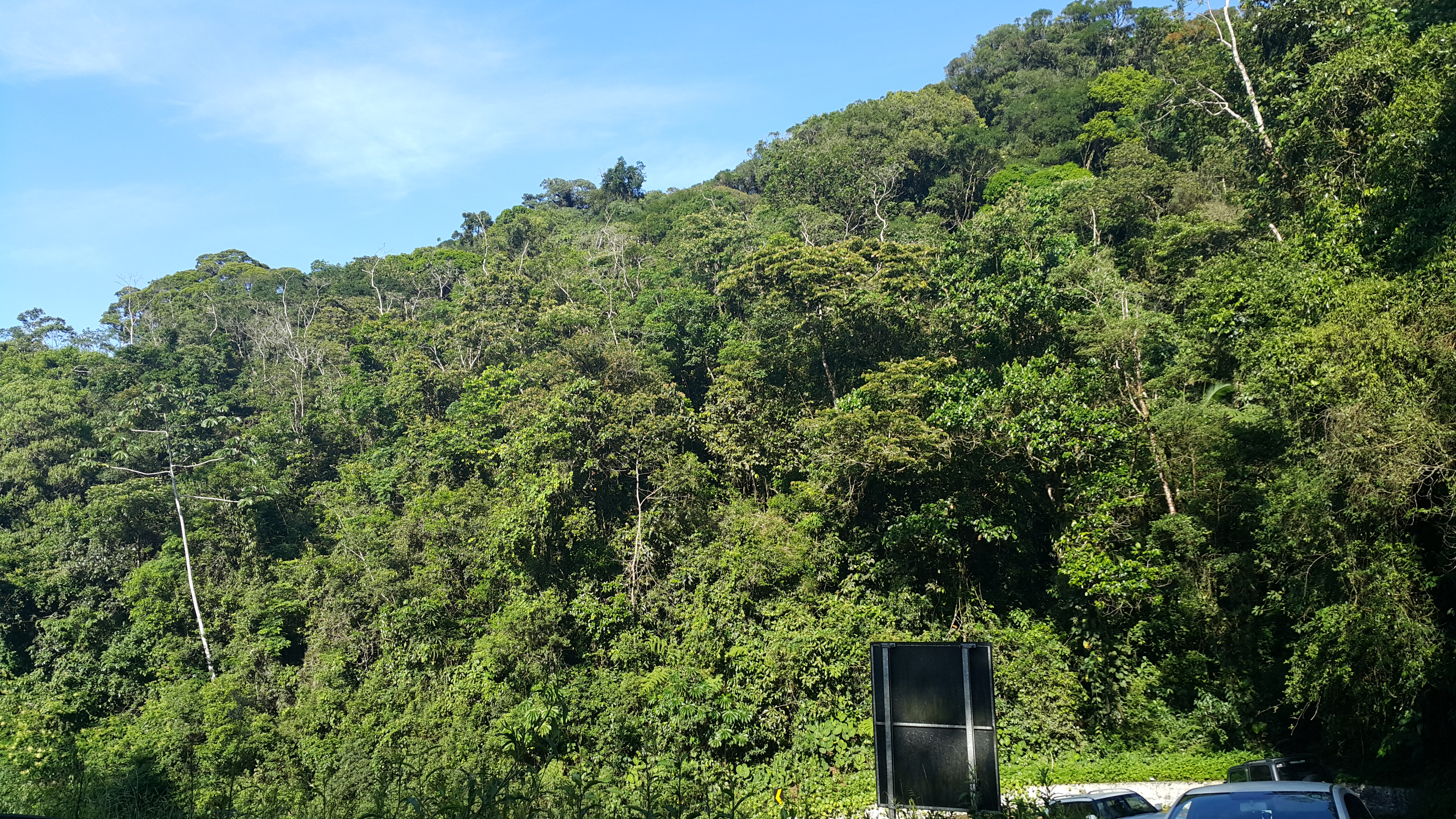
Serra do Mar coastal forests, a humid tropical forest

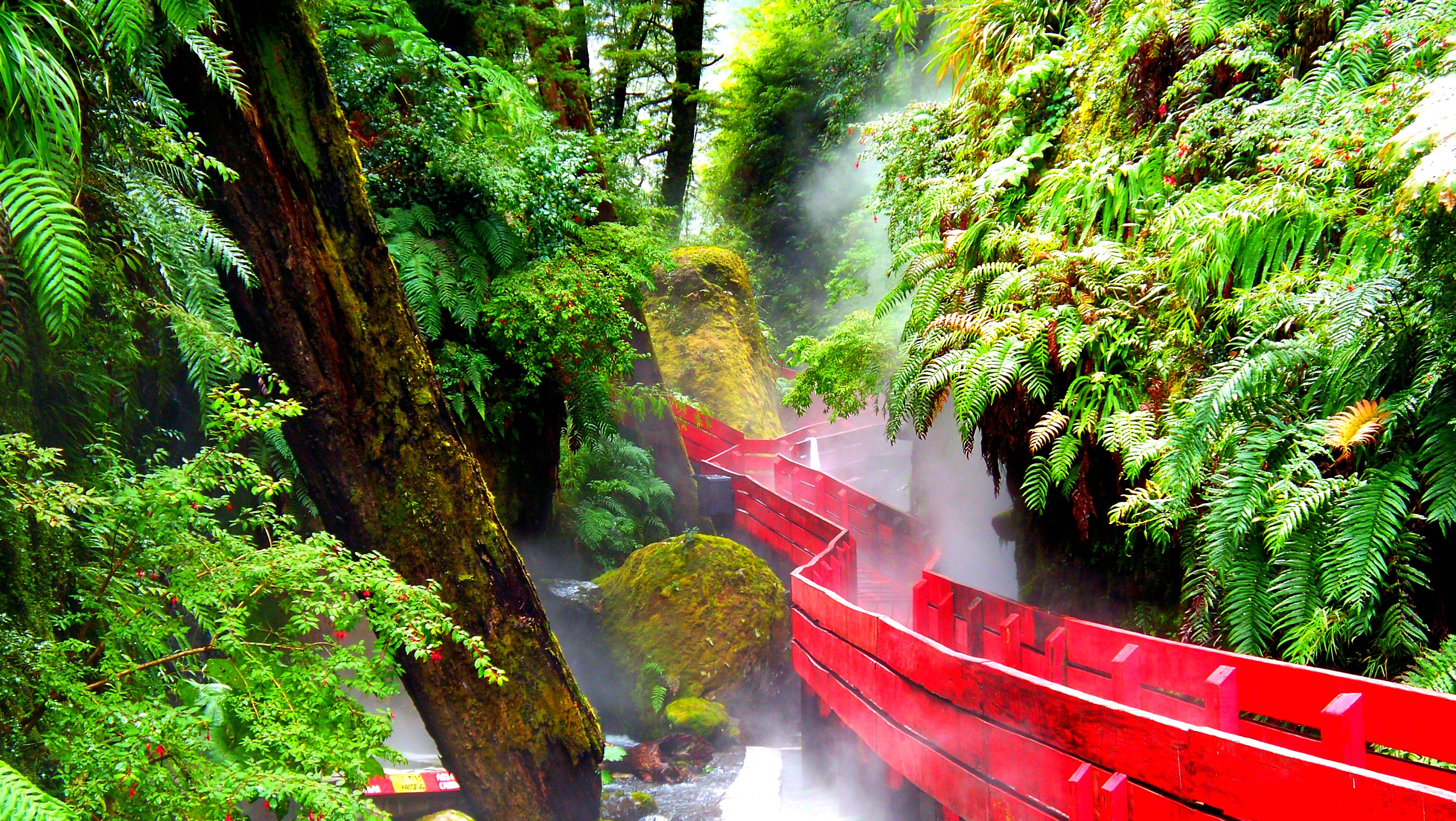
Valdivian temperate forests, a temperate forest

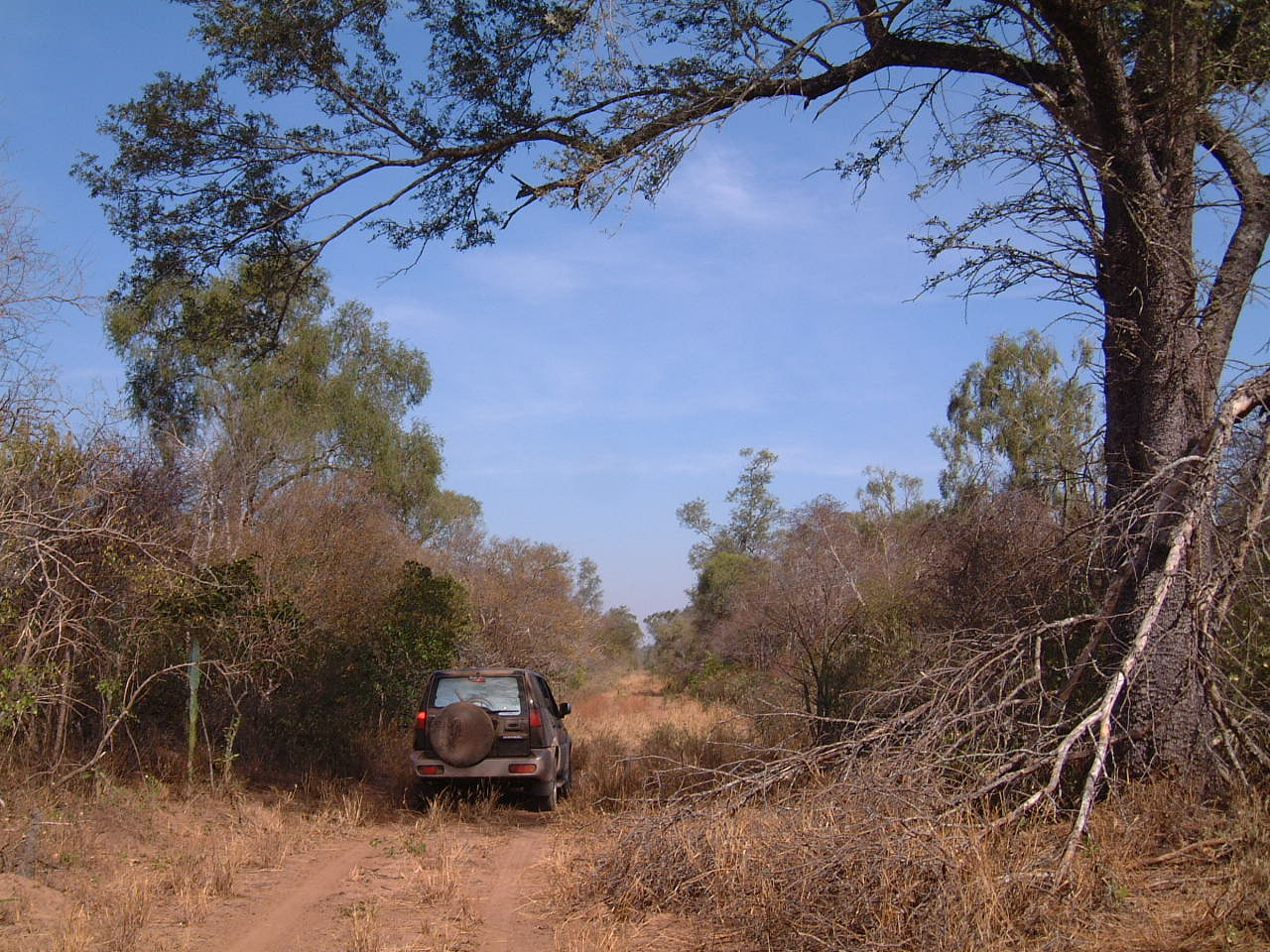
Gran Chaco, a tropical dry woodland

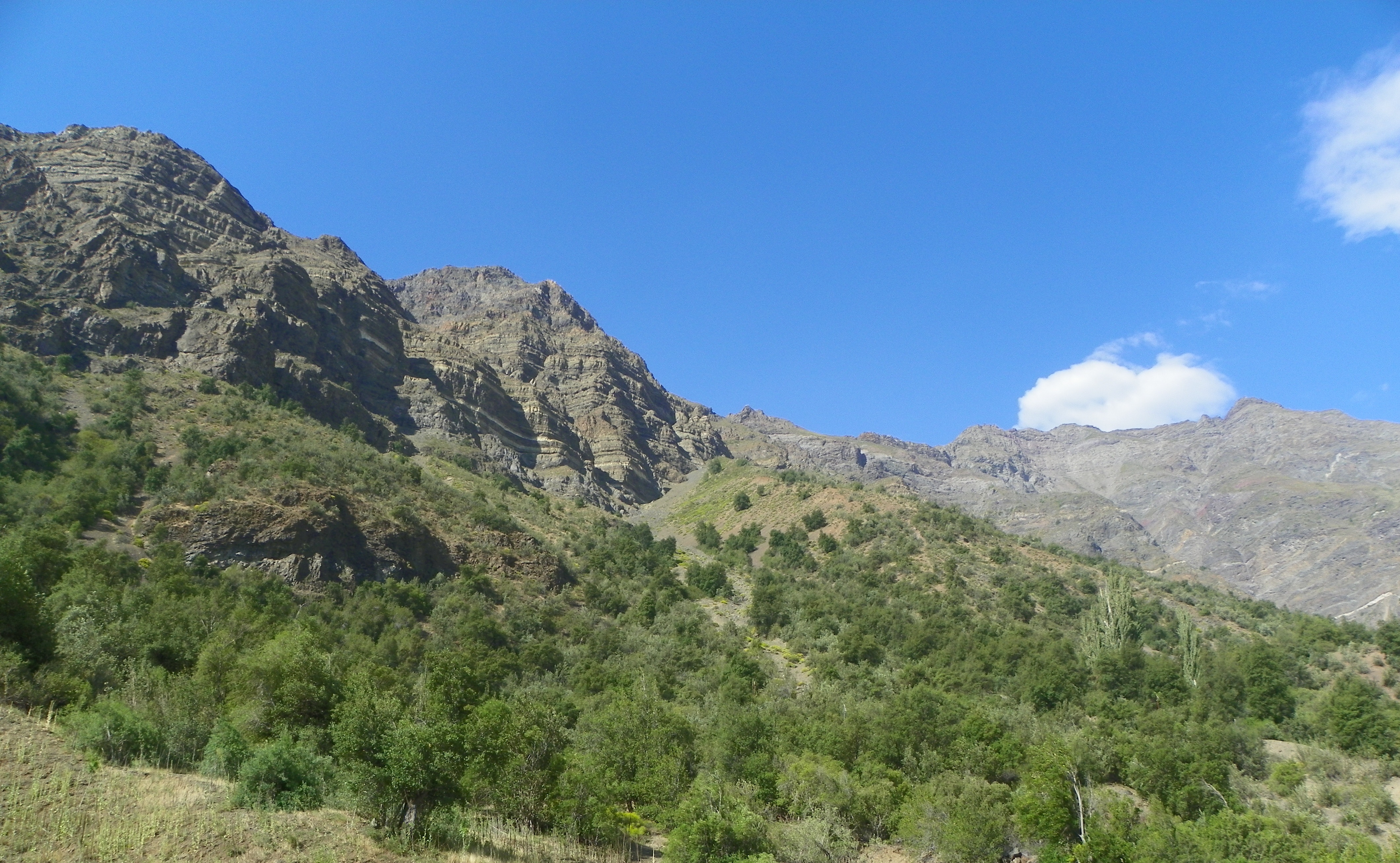
Chilean Matorral, an evergreen sclerophyllous scrubland

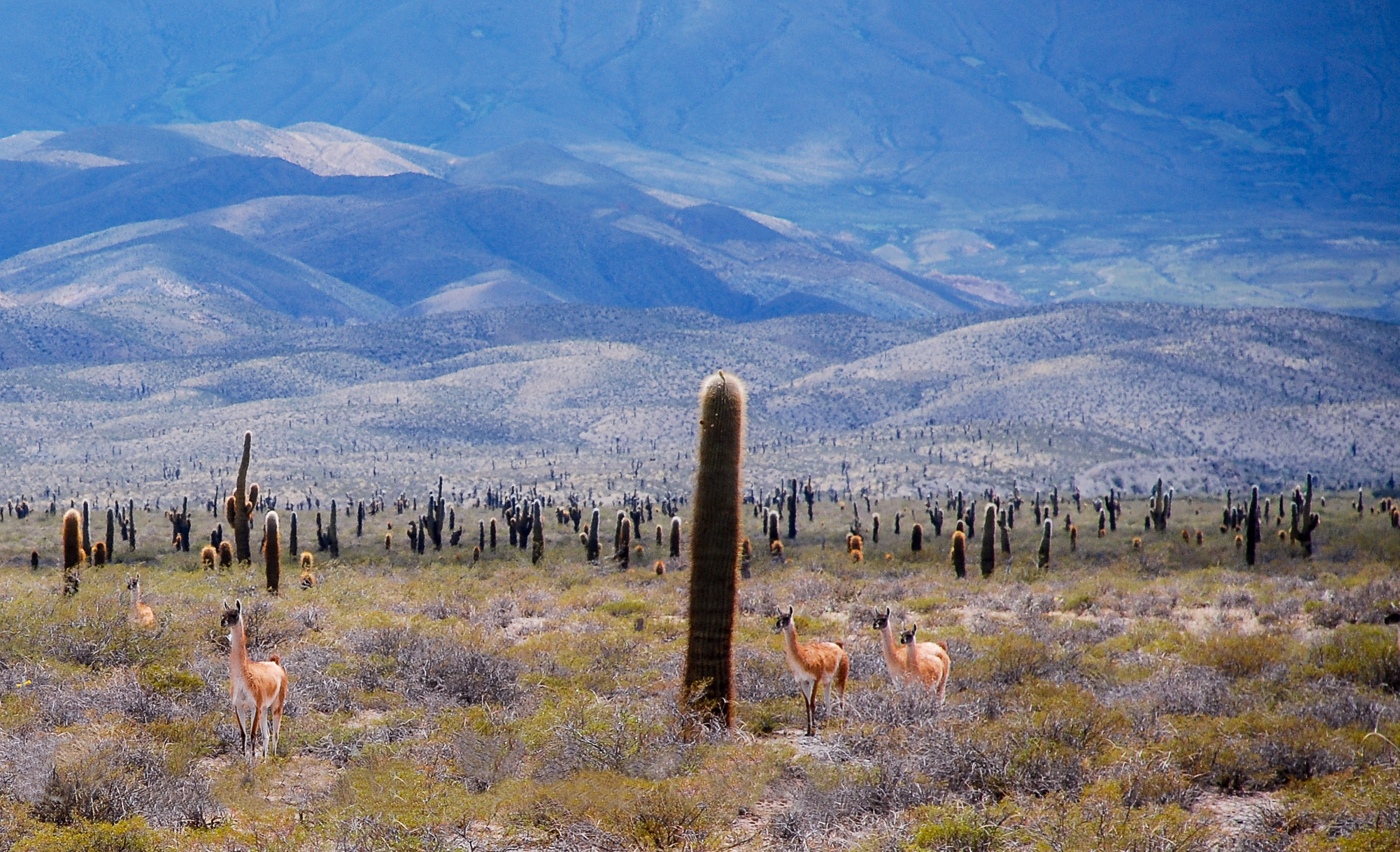
Los Cardones National Park, a warm desert

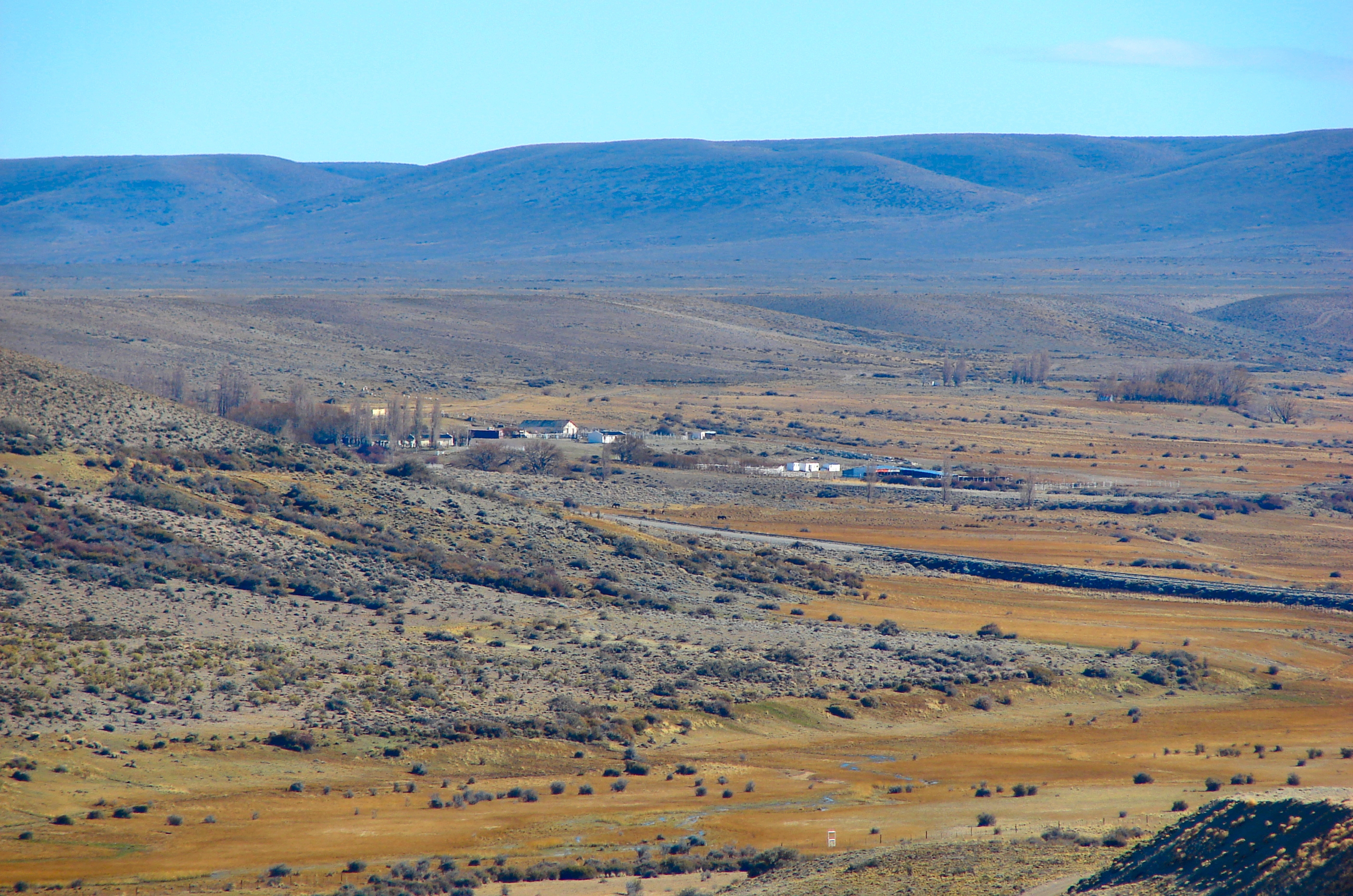
Santa Cruz Province, a cold steppe

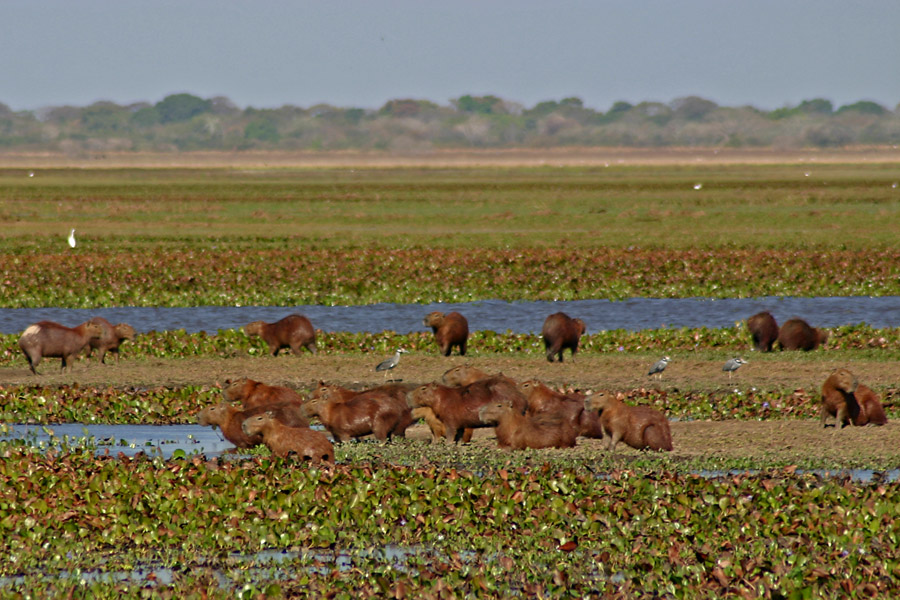
Llanos, a tropical grassland

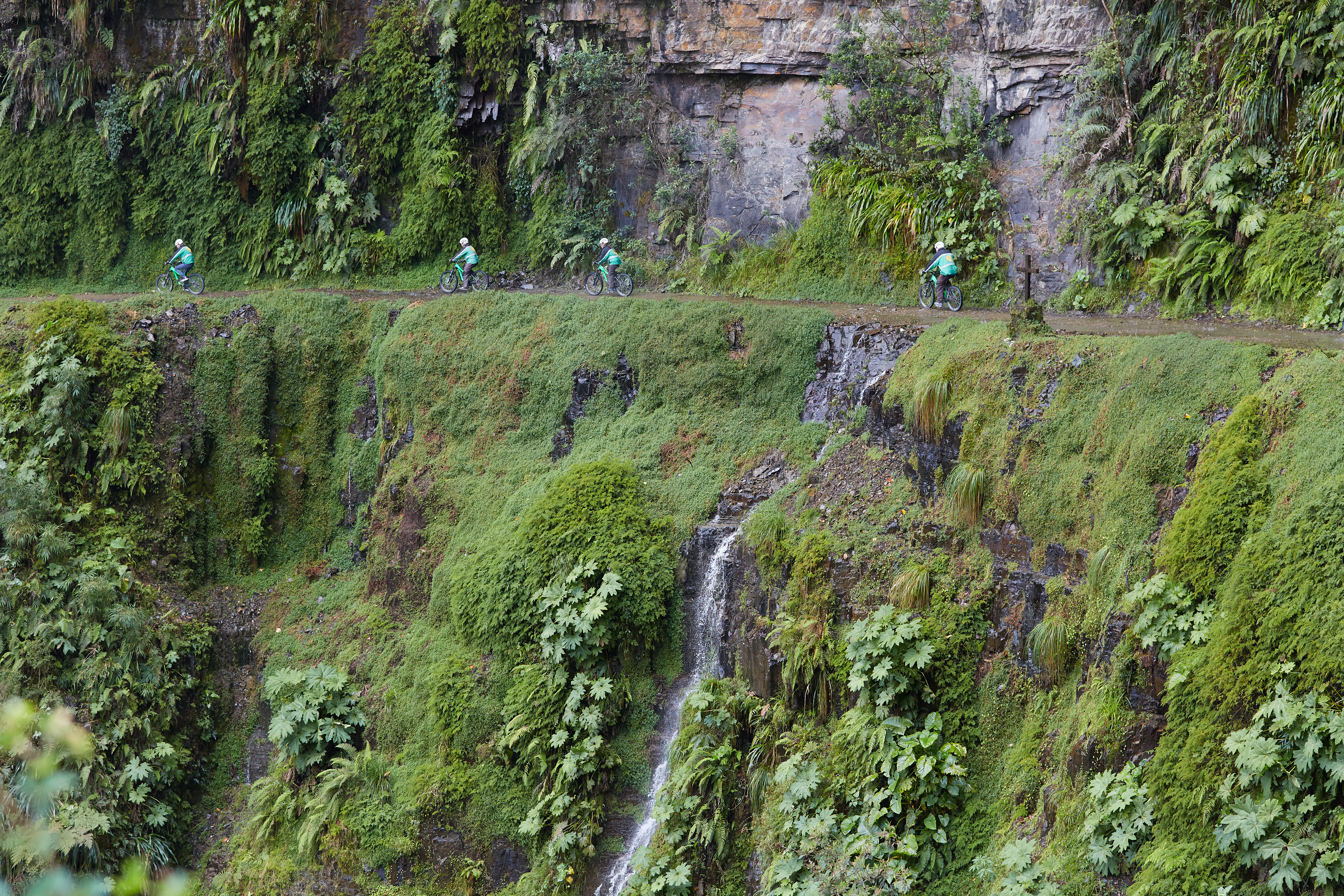
Yungas Road, a montane system

== Oceanian Realm ==
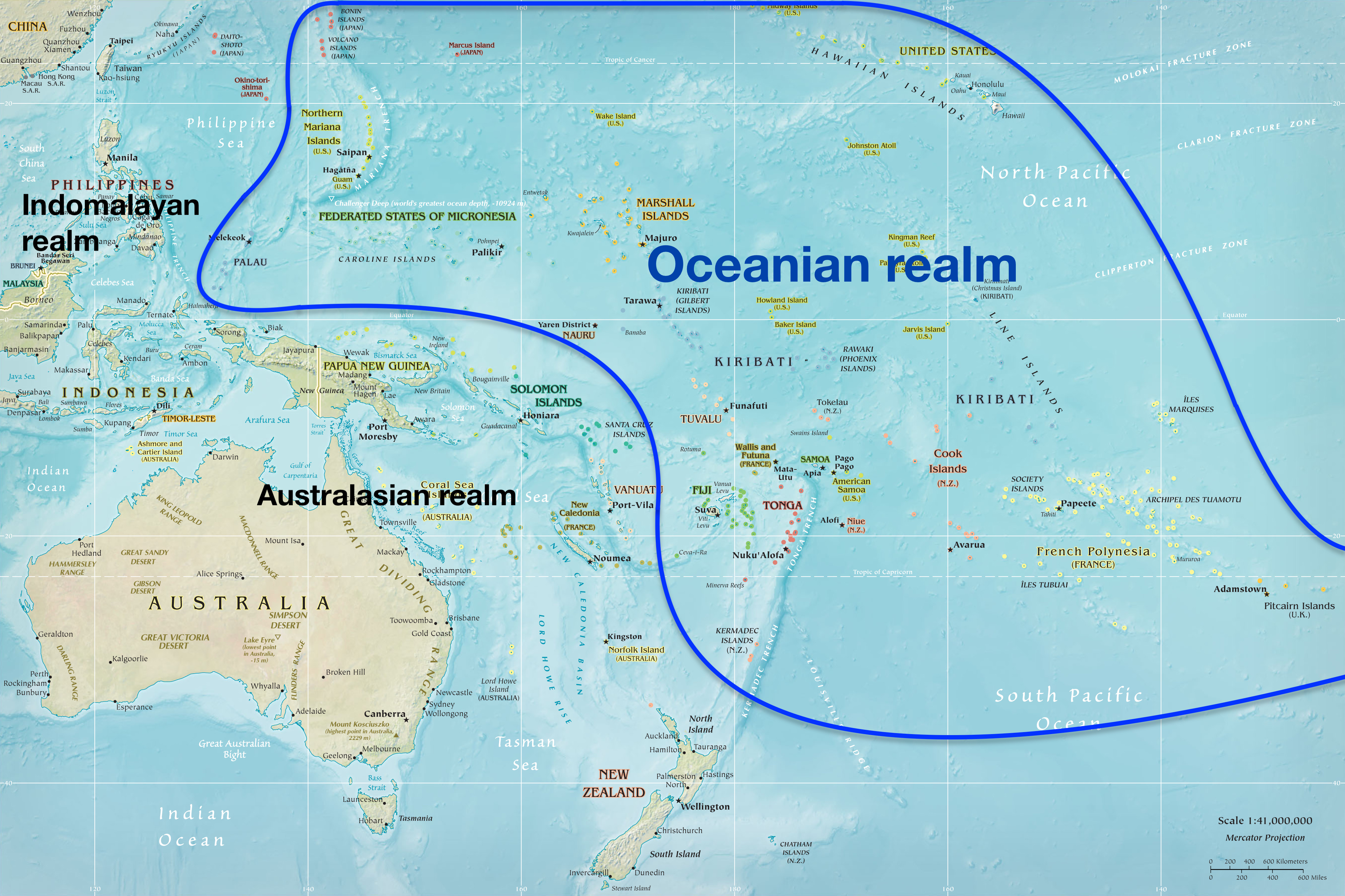
Map of Oceanian realm (Udvardy's version includes New Guinea and Melanesia).

- Mixed island systems
  - Papuan
  - Micronesian
  - Hawaiian
  - Southeastern Polynesian
  - Central Polynesian
  - New Caledonian
  - East Melanesian
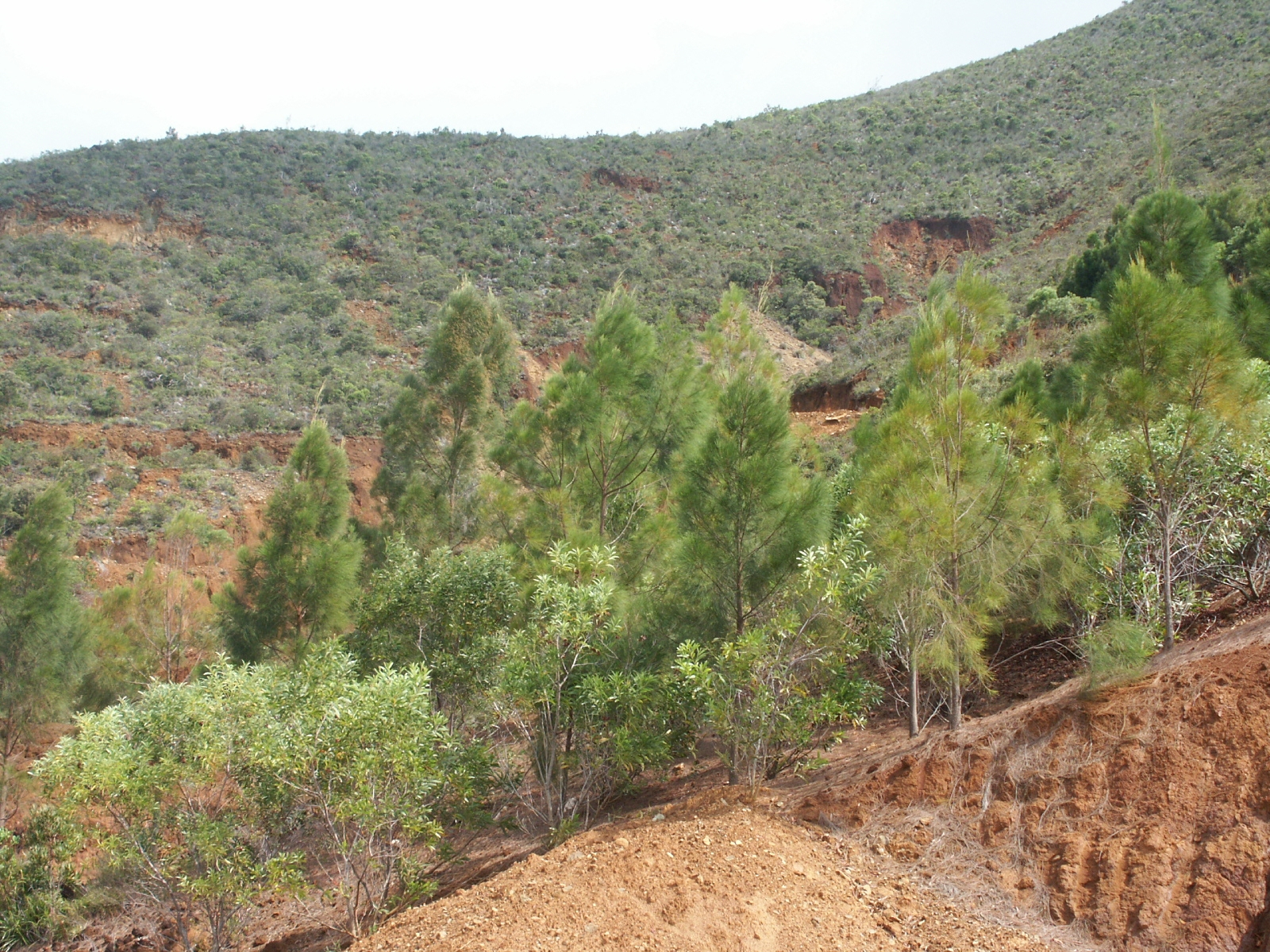
Tropical savannah in New Caledonia

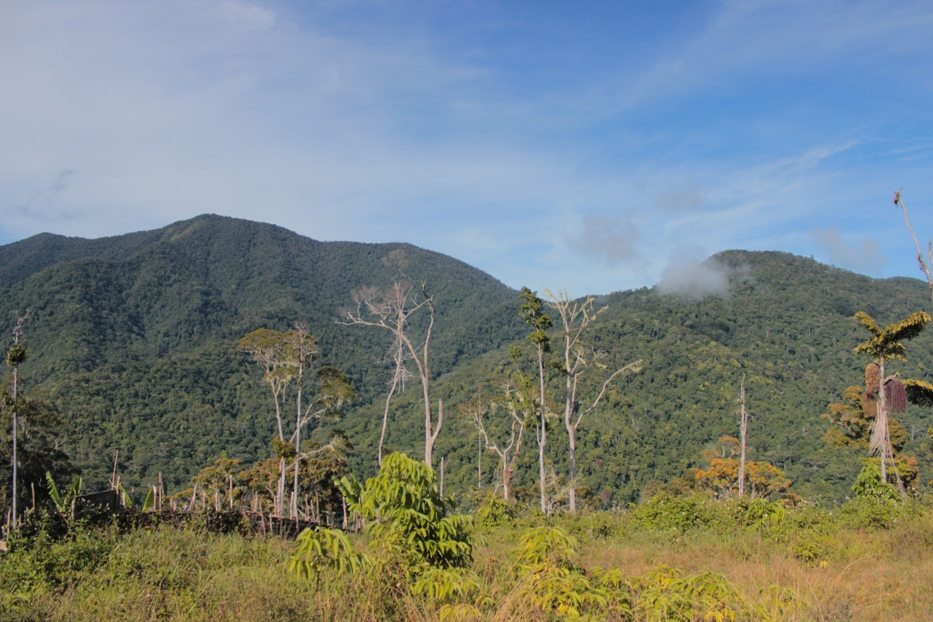
Arfak Mountains, a montane forest

== Palearctic Realm ==
The outlined ecoregions of the eastern Palearctic realm, color-coded by biome.

The outlined ecoregions of the western Palearctic realm, color-coded by biome. This realm has 10 of 14 biomes, or major habitat types, as defined by Olson & Dinerstein, et al. (2001).: 01. Tropical and subtropical moist broadleaf forests; 02. Tropical and subtropical dry broadleaf forests; 03. Tropical and subtropical coniferous forests; 04. Temperate broadleaf and mixed forests; 05. Temperate coniferous forests; 06. Taiga and Boreal forest; 07. Tropical and subtropical grasslands, savannas, and shrublands; 08. Temperate grasslands, savannas, and shrublands; 09. Flooded grasslands and savannas; 10. Montane grasslands and shrublands; 11. Tundra; 12. Mediterranean forests, woodlands, and scrub; 13. Deserts and xeric shrublands; 14. Mangroves; Rock and Ice, or Abiotic Land Zones

- Subtropical and temperate rain forests or woodlands
  - Chinese Subtropical Forest
  - Japanese Evergreen Forest (Japanese Subtropical Forest)
- Temperate needle-leaf forests or woodlands
  - West Eurasian Taiga
  - East Siberian Taiga
- Temperate broad-leaf forests or woodlands, and subpolar deciduous thickets
  - Icelandic
  - Subarctic Birchwoods
  - Kamchatkan
  - British Isles (British and Irish Forest)
  - Atlantic (West European Forest)
  - Boreonemoral (Baltic Lowland)
  - Middle European Forest (East European Mixed Forest)
  - Pannonian (Danubian Steppe)
  - West Anatolian
  - Manchu-Japanese Mixed Forest
  - Oriental Deciduous Forest
- Evergreen sclerophyllous forests, scrubs or woodlands
  - Iberian Highlands
  - Mediterranean Sclerophyll
- Warm deserts and semideserts
  - Sahara
  - Arabian Desert (Arabia)
  - Anatolian-Iranian Desert (Turkish-Iranian Scrub-steppe)
- Cold-winter (continental) deserts and semideserts
  - Turanian (Kazakh Desert Scrub-steppe)
  - Talka-Makan-Gobi Desert
  - Tibetan
  - Iranian Desert
- Tundra communities and barren Arctic desert
  - Arctic Desert
  - Higharctic Tundra
  - Lowarctic Tundra
- Temperate grasslands
  - Atlas Steppe (Atlas Highlands)
  - Pontian Steppe (Ukraine-Kazakh Steppe)
  - Mongolian-Manchurian Steppe (Gobi-Manchurian Steppe)
- Mixed mountain and highland systems with complex zonation
  - Scottish Highlands
  - Central European Highlands
  - Balkan Highlands
  - Caucaso-Iranian Highlands (Caucasus and Kurdistan-Iran Highlands)
  - Altai Highlands
  - Pamir-Tian Shan Highlands
  - Hindu Kush Highlands
  - Himalayan Highlands
  - Szechwan Highlands
- Mixed island systems
  - Macaronesian Islands
  - Ryukyu Islands
- Lake systems
  - Lake Ladoga
  - Aral Sea
  - Lake Baikal
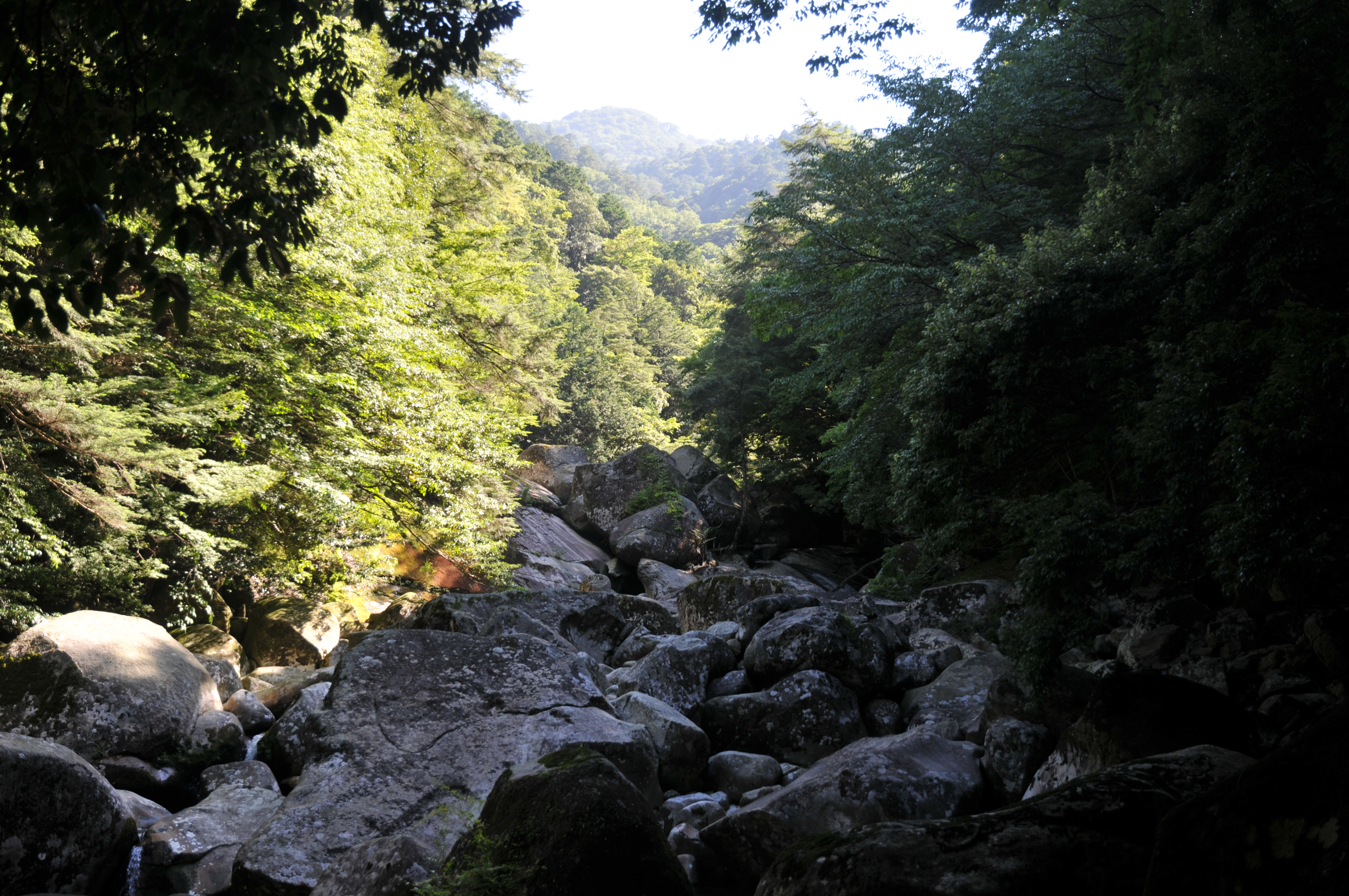
Ashizuri-Uwakai National Park, a temperate rainforest

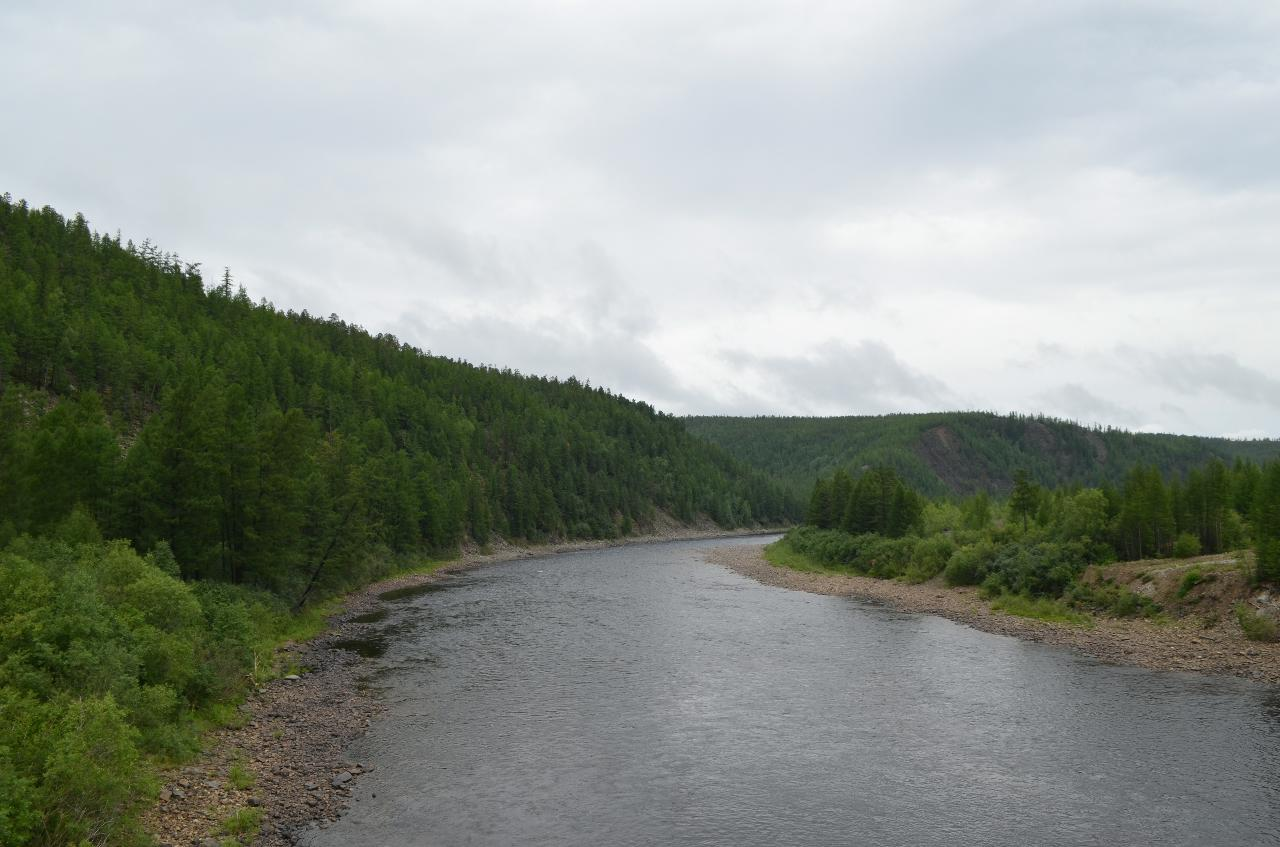
Olyokma Nature Reserve, a temperate needle-leaf forest

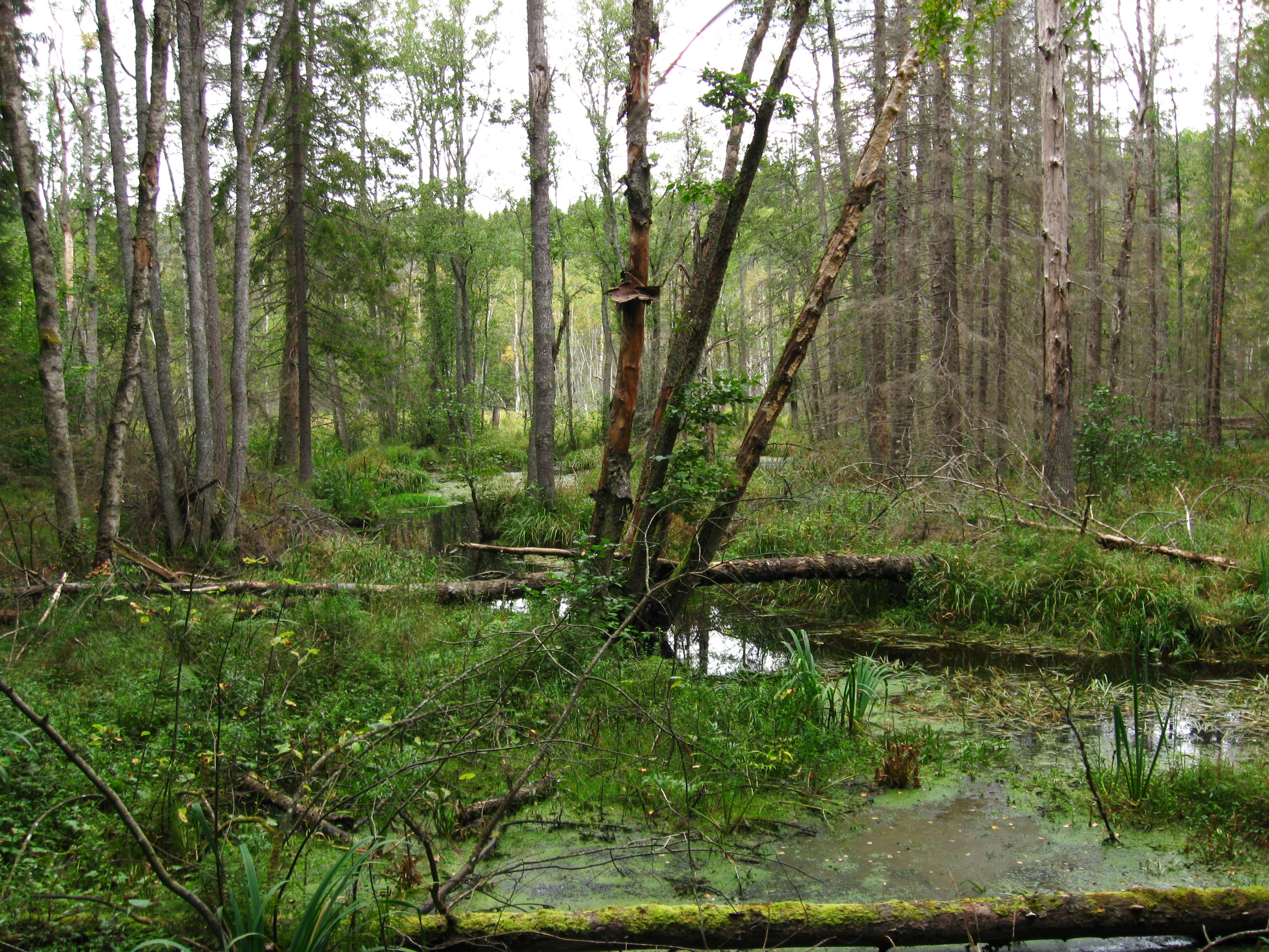
Sarmatic mixed forests, a temperate broad-leaf forest

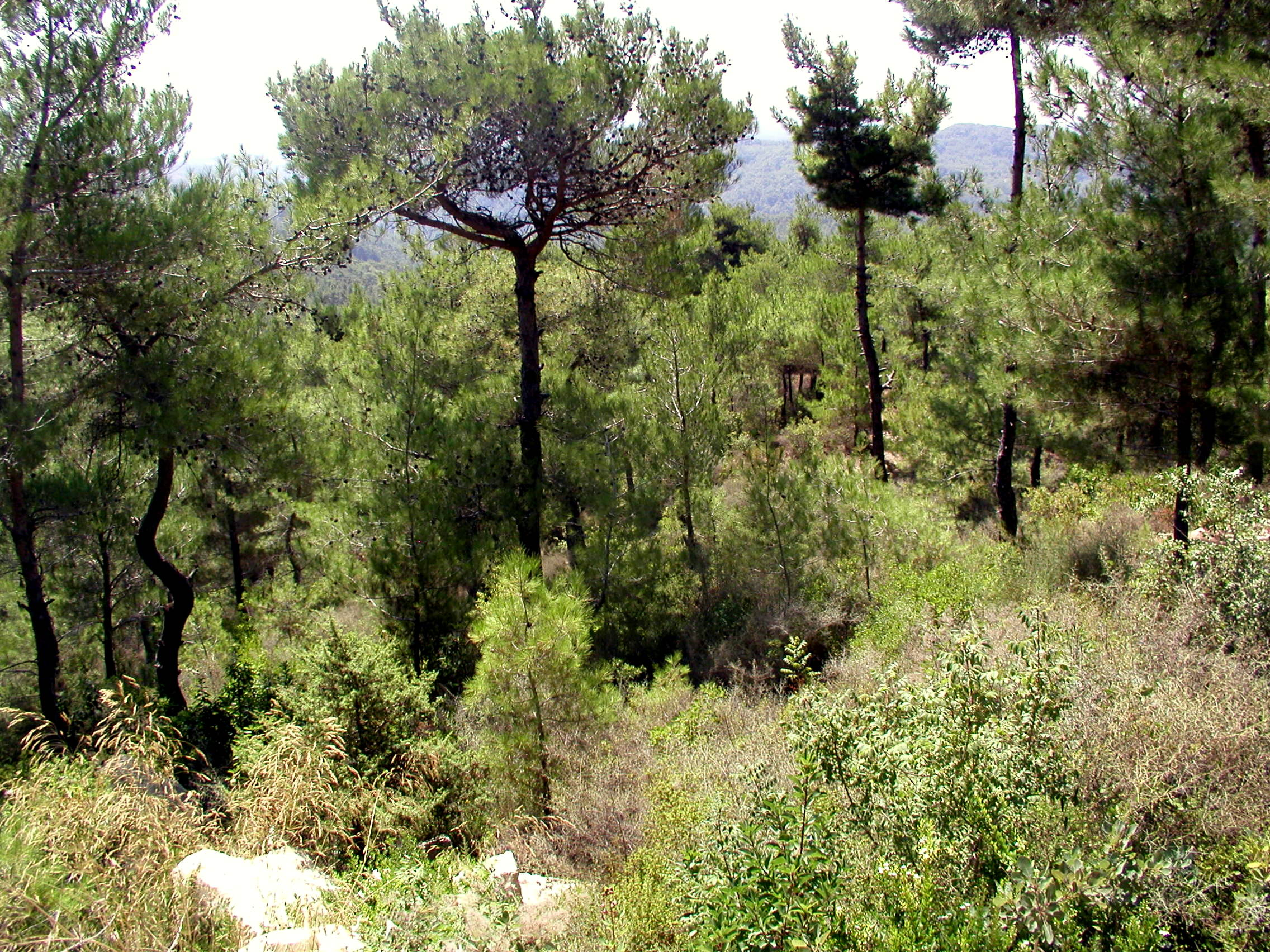
Eastern Mediterranean conifer-sclerophyllous-broadleaf forests, an evergreen sclerophyllous woodland

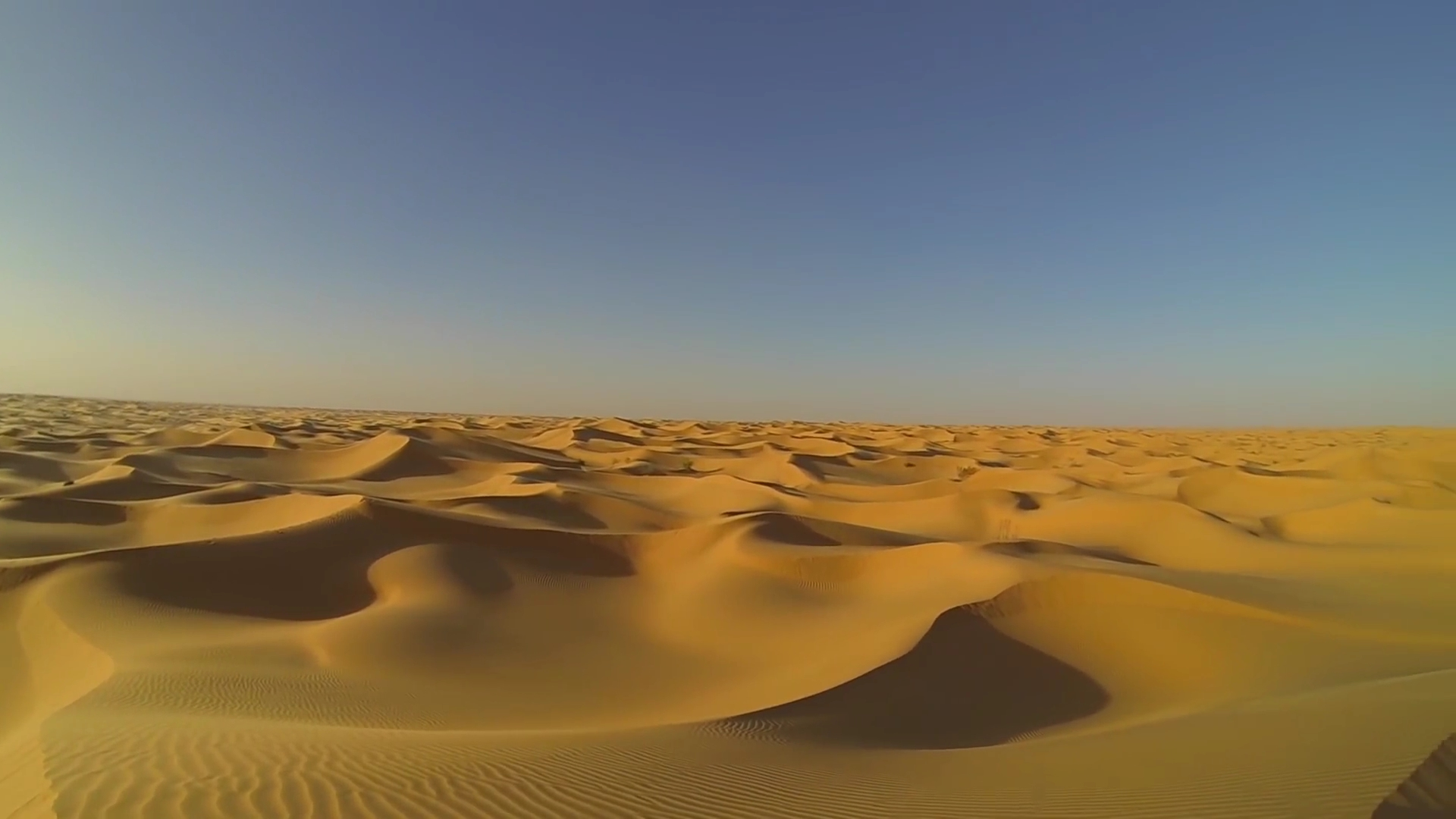
The Sahara, a warm desert

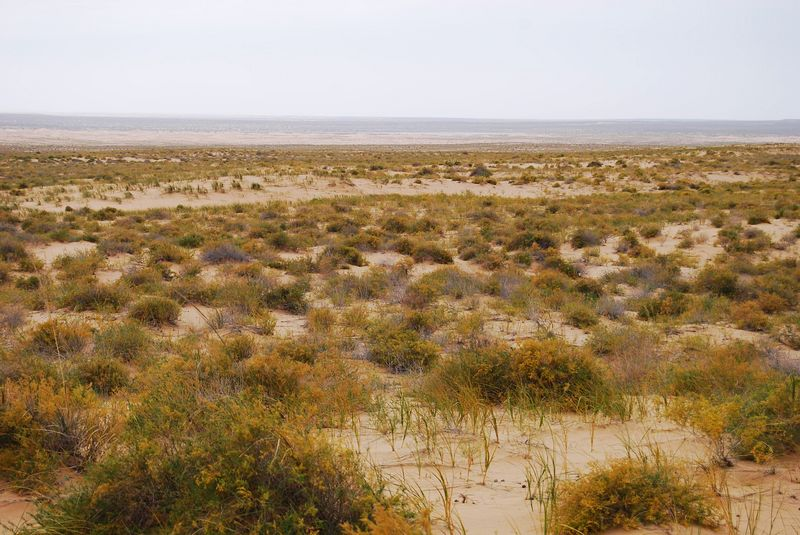
Gobi Desert, a cold desert

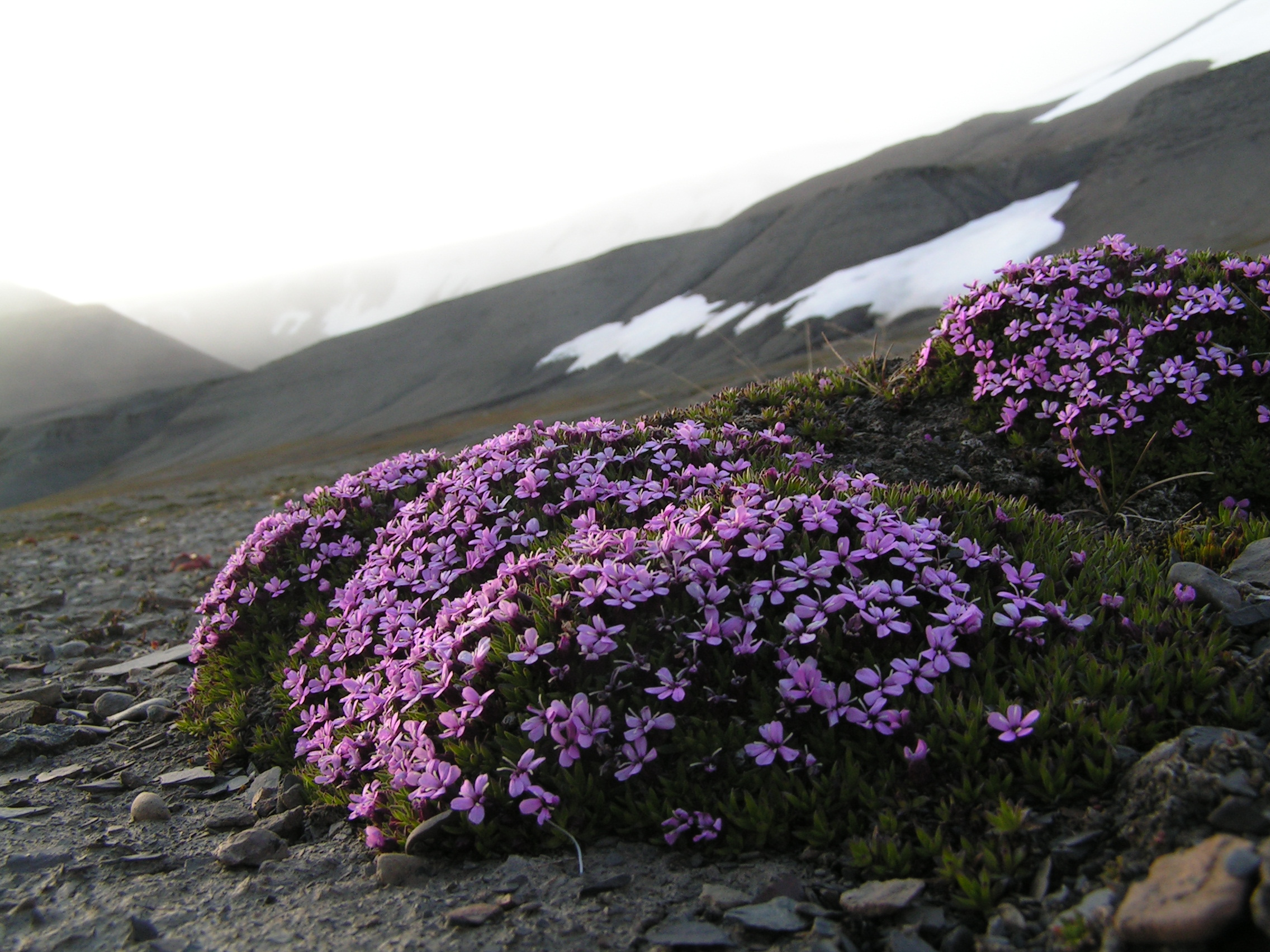
Søraust-Svalbard Nature Reserve, a tundra

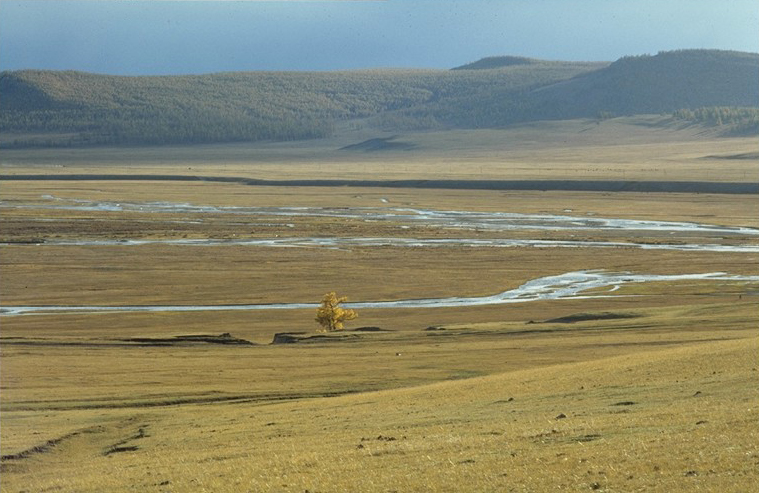
Mongolian-Manchurian grassland, a temperate grassland

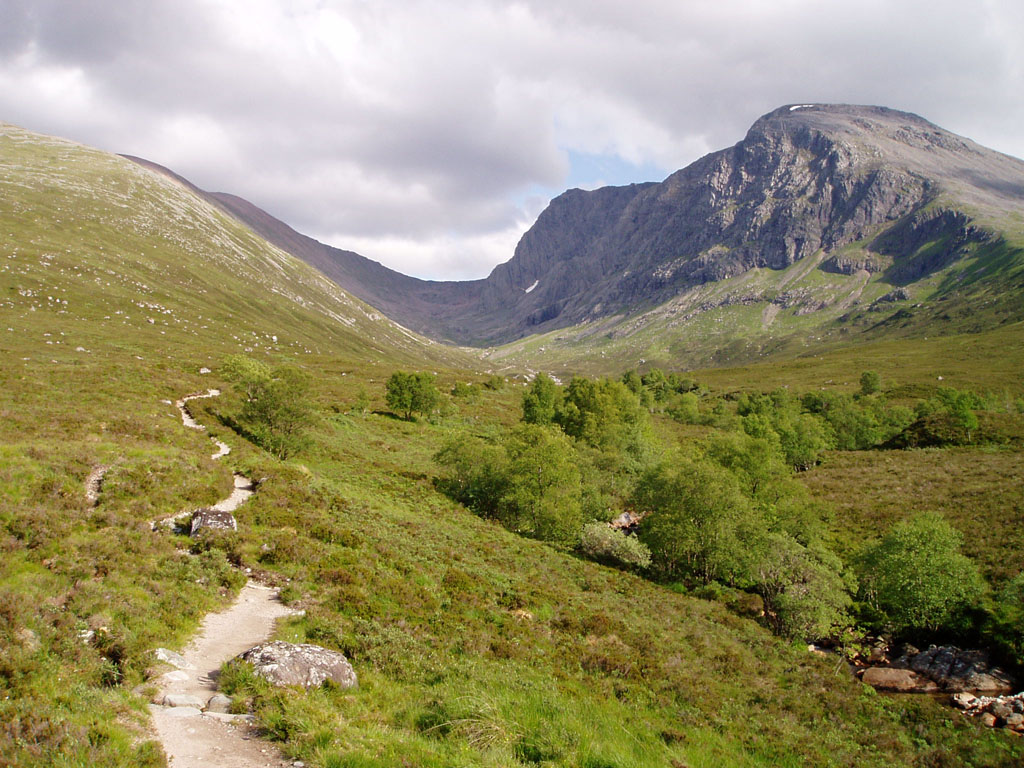
Ben Nevis, a montane system

== Region coding ==
The hierarchy of the scheme is (with early replaced terms in parentheses):

- biogeographic realm (= biogeographic regions and subregions), with 8 categories
  - biogeographic province (= biotic province), with 193 categories, each characterized by a major biome or biome-complex
    - biome, with 14 types: tropical humid forests (1); subtropical and temperate rain forests or woodlands (2); temperate needle-leaf forests or woodlands (3); tropical dry of deciduous forests (including monsoon forests) or woodlands (4); temperate broad-lead forests or woodlands and subpolar deciduous thickets (5); evergreen sclerophyllous forests, scrubs or woodlands (6); warm deserts and semideserts (7); cold-winter (continental) deserts and semideserts (8); tundra communities and barren arctic desert (9); tropical grassland and savannas (10); temperate grasslands (11); mixed mountain and highland systems with complex zonation (12); mixed island systems (13); lake systems (14).

So, for example, the Australian Central Desert province is in the Australasian realm (6), is the 9th biogeographic province in that realm, and its biome falls within "warm deserts and semideserts" (7), so it is coded 6.9.7.

The realms and provinces of the scheme are hence coded as follows:

(1) Nearctic realm
- 1.1.2 Sitkan province
- 1.2.2. Oregonian province
- 1.3.3 Yukon taiga province
- 1.4.3 Canadian taiga province
- 1.5.5. Eastern forest province
- 1.6.5 Austroriparian province
- 1.7.6 Californian province
- 1.8.7 Sonoran province
- 1.9.7 Chihuahuan province
- 1.10.7 Tamaulipan province
- 1.11.8 Great Basin province
- 1.12.9 Aleutian Islands province
- 1.13.9 Alaskan tundra province
- 1.14.9 Canadian tundra province
- 1.15.9 Arctic Archipelago province
- 1.16.9 Greenland tundra province
- 1.17.9 Arctic desert and icecap province
- 1.18.11 Grasslands province
- 1.19.12 Rocky Mountains province
- 1.20.12 Sierra-Cascade province
- 1.21.12 Madrean-Cordilleran province
- 1.22.14 Great Lakes province
(2) Palearctic realm
- 2.1.2. Chinese Subtropical Forest province
- 2.2.2 Japanese Evergreen Forest province (= Japanese Subtropical Forest)
- 2.3.3 West Eurasian Taiga province
- 2.4.3 East Siberian Taiga province
- 2.5.5 Icelandian province (= Iceland)
- 2.6.5 Subarctic Birchwoods province
- 2.7.5 Kamchatkan province
- 2.8.5 British Islands province (= British + Irish Forest)
- 2.9.5 Atlantic province (West European Forest, in part)
- 2.10.5 Boreonemoral province (Baltic Lowland, in part)
- 2.11.5 Middle European Forest province (= East European Mixed Forest)
- 2.12.5 Pannonian province (= Danubian Steppe)
- 2.13.5 West Anatolian province
- 2.14.5 Manchu-Japanese Mixed Forest province (= Manchurian + Japanese Mixed Forest)
- 2.15.6 Oriental Deciduous Forest province
- 2.16.6 Iberian Highlands province
- 2.17.7 Mediterranean Sclerophyll province
- 2.18.7 Sahara province
- 2.19.7 Arabian Desert province (= Arabia)
- 2.20.8 Anatolian-Iranian Desert province (= Turkish-Iranian Scrub-steppe)
- 2.21.8 Turanian province (= Kazakh Desert Scrub-steppe)
- 2.22.8 Takla-Makan-Gobi Desert steppe province
- 2.23.8 Tibetan province
- 2.24.9 Iranian Desert province
- 2.25.9 Arctic Desert province
- 2.26.9 Higharctic Tundra province (= Eurasian Tundra, in part)
- 2.27.11 Lowarctic Tundra province (= Eurasian Tundra, in part)
- 2.28.11 Atlas Steppe province (= Atlas Highlands)
- 2.29.11 Pontian Steppe province (= Ukraine-Kazakh Steppe)
- 2.30.11 Mongolian-Manchurian Steppe province (= Gobi + Manchurian Steppe)
- 2.31.12 Scottish Highlands Highlands province
- 2.32.12 Central European Highlands province
- 2.33.12 Balkan Highlands province
- 2.34.12 Caucaso-Iranian Highlands (= Caucasus + Kurdistan-Iran) province
- 2.35.12 Altai Highlands province
- 2.36.12 Pamir-Tian-Shan Highlands province
- 2.37.12 Hindu Kush Highlands province
- 2.38.12 Himalayan Highlands province
- 2.39.12 Szechwan Highlands province
- 2.40.13 Macaronesian Islands province (= 4 island provinces)
- 2.41.13 Ryukyu Islands province
- 2.42.14 Lake Ladoga province
- 2.43.14 Aral Sea province
- 2.44.14 Lake Baikal province
(3) Afrotropical realm
- 3.1.1 Guinean Rain Forest province
- 3.2.1 Congo Rain Forest province
- 3.3.1 Malagasy Rain Forest province
- 3.4.4 West African Woodland/savanna province
- 3.5.4 East African Woodland/savanna province
- 3.6.4 Congo Woodland/savanna province
- 3.7.4 Miombo Woodland/savanna province
- 3.8.4 South African Woodland/savanna province
- 3.9.4 Malagasy Woodland/savanna province
- 3.10.4 Malagasy Thorn Forest province
- 3.11.6 Cape Sclerophyll province
- 3.12.7 Western Sahel province
- 3.13.7 Eastern Sahel province
- 3.14.7 Somalian province
- 3.15.7 Namib province
- 3.16.7 Kalahari province
- 3.17.7 Karroo province
- 3.18.12 Ethiopian Highlands province
- 3.19.12 Guinean Highlands province
- 3.20.12 Central African Highlands province
- 3.21.12 East African Highlands province
- 3.22.12 South African Highlands province
- 3.23.13 Ascension and St. Helena Islands province
- 3.24.13 Comores Islands and Aldabra province
- 3.25.13 Mascarene Islands province
- 3.26.14 Lake Rudolf province
- 3.27.14 Lake Ukerewe (Victoria) province
- 3.28.14 Lake Tanganyika province
- 3.29.14 Lake Malawi (Nyasa) province
(4) Indomalayan realm
- 4.1.1 Malabar Rainforest province
- 4.2.1 Ceylonese Rainforest province
- 4.3.1 Bengalian Rainforest province
- 4.4.1 Burman Rainforest province
- 4.5.1 Indochinese Rainforest province
- 4.6.1 South Chinese Rainforest province
- 4.7.1 Malayan Rainforest province
- 4.8.4 Indus-Ganges Monsoon Forest province
- 4.9.4 Burma Monsoon Forest province
- 4.10.4 Thailandian Monsoon Forest province
- 4.11.4 Mahanadian province
- 4.12.4 Coromandel province
- 4.13.4 Ceylonese Monsoon Forest province
- 4.14.4 Deccan Thorn Forest province
- 4.15.7 Thar Desert province
- 4.16.12 Seychelles and Amirantes Islands province
- 4.17.12 Laccadives Islands province
- 4.18.12 Maldives and Chagos Islands province
- 4.19.12 Cocos-Keeling and Christmas Islands province
- 4.20.12 Andaman and Nicobar Islands province
- 4.21.12 Sumatra province
- 4.22.12 Java province
- 4.23.12 Lesser Sunda Islands province
- 4.24.12 Celebes province
- 4.25.12 Borneo province
- 4.26.12 Philippines province
- 4.27.12 Taiwan province
(5) Oceanian realm
- 5.1.13 Papuan province
- 5.2.13 Micronesian province
- 5.3.13 Hawaiian province
- 5.4.13 Southeastern Polynesian province
- 5.5.13 Central Polynesian province
- 5.6.13 New Caledonian province
- 5.7.13 East-Melanesian province
(6) Australasian realm
- 6.1.1 Queensland Coastal province
- 6.2.2 Tasmanian province
- 6.3.4 Northern Coastal province
- 6.4.6 Western Sclerophyll province
- 6.5.6 Southern Sclerophyll province
- 6.6.6 Eastern Sclerophyll province≠
- 6.7.6 Brigalow province
- 6.8.7 Western Mulga province
- 6.9.7 Central Desert province
- 6.10.7 Southern Mulga/Saltbush province
- 6.11.10 Northern Savanna province
- 6.12.10 Northern Grasslands province
- 6.13.11 Eastern Grasslands and Savannas province
(7) Antarctic realm
- 7.1.2 Neozealandia province
- 7.2.9 Maudlandia province
- 7.3.9 Marielandia province
- 7.4.9 Insulantarctica province
(8) Neotropical realm
- 8.1.1 Campechean province (= Campeche)
- 8.2.1 Panamanian province
- 8.3.1 Colombian Coastal province
- 8.4.1. Guyanese province
- 8.5.1 Amazonian province
- 8.6.1. Madeiran province
- 8.7.1 Serra do mar province (= Bahian coast)
- 8.8.2 Brazilian Rain Forest province (= Brazilian Deciduous Forest)
- 8.9.2 Brazilian Planalto province (= Brazilian Araucaria Forest)
- 8.10.2 Valdivian Forest province (= Chilean Temperate Rain Forest, in part)
- 8.11.2 Chilean Nothofagus province (= Chilean Temperate Rain Forest, in part)
- 8.12.4 Everglades province
- 8.13.4 Sinaloan province
- 8.14.4 Guerreran province
- 8.15.4 Yucatecan province (= Yucatán)
- 8.16.4 Central American province (= Carib-Pacific)
- 8.17.4 Venezuelan Dry Forest province
- 8.18.4 Venezuelan Deciduous Forest province
- 8.19.4 Ecuadorian Dry Forest province
- 8.20.4 Caatinga province
- 8.21.4 Gran Chaco province
- 8.22.5 Chilean Araucaria Forest province
- 8.23.6 Chilean Sclerophyll province
- 8.24.7 Pacific Desert province (= Peruvian + Atacama Desert)
- 8.25.7 Monte (= Argentinian Thorn-scrub) province
- 8.26.8 Patagonian province
- 8.27.10 Llanos province
- 8.28.10 Campos Limpos province (= Guyana highlands)
- 8.29.10 Babacu province
- 8.30.10 Campos Cerrados province (= Campos)
- 8.31.11 Argentinian Pampas province (= Pampas)
- 8.32.11 Uruguayan Pampas province
- 8.33.12 Northern Andean province (= Northern Andes)
- 8.34.12 Colombian Montane province
- 8.35.12 Yungas province (= Andean cloud forest)
- 8.36.12 Puna province
- 8.37.12 Southern Andean province (= Southern Andes)
- 8.38.13 Bahamas-Bermudan province (= Bahamas + Bermuda)
- 8.39.13 Cuban province
- 8.40.13 Greater Aritillean province (= Jamaica + Hispaniola + Puerto Rico)
- 8.41.13 Lesser Antillean province (= Lesser Antilles)
- 8.42.13 Revilla Gigedo Island province
- 8.43.13 Cocos Island province
- 8.44.13 Galapagos Islands province
- 8.45.13 Fernando de Noronja Island province
- 8.46.13 South Trinidade Island province
- 8.47.14 Lake Titicaca province

== See also ==
- Biogeographic provinces of hydrothermal vent systems
- Floristic province
- List of ecoregions

== Bibliography ==
- Dassman, Raymond (1976). "Biogeographical Provinces". CoEvolution Quarterly, Number 11, Fall 1976.
