= German Society for Biological Systematics =

- Gesellschaft für Biologische Systematik
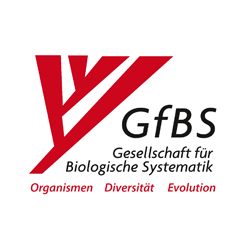
- Abbreviation: GfBS
- Formation: 1997
- Type: Scientific society
- Legal status: Registered association (e.V.)
- Purpose: Systematics & Taxonomy
- Headquarters: Berlin, Germany
- President: Thomas Bartolomaeus
- Affiliations: VBIO, BioSyst.EU
- Website: www.gfbs-home.de

The Gesellschaft für Biologische Systematik (English: German Society for Biological Systematics) is a German scientific society that promotes research and networking in the fields of biological systematics, taxonomy, phylogenetics, evolution, and biodiversity science. Founded in Berlin in 1997, the society brings together researchers working across zoology, botany, palaeontology, protozoology, and related disciplines concerned with the diversity of organisms.

== Activities ==
The GfBS organizes an annual scientific meeting.

The society is also associated with the academic journal Organisms, Diversity & Evolution, which has been published since 2001 and is currently distributed by Springer Nature, having been initially published with Elsevier.

== Affiliations ==
The GfBS is a member society of the Verband Biologie, Biowissenschaften und Biomedizin in Deutschland (VBIO). It is also a participant in BioSyst.EU, a European umbrella network of systematic biology societies.

== Awards ==
The society awards the Bernhard Rensch Prize, established in 2004, for outstanding doctoral dissertations in biological systematics. The name of the prize honours Bernhard Rensch, a German evolutionary biologist and ornithologist.

== Honorary members ==
Elected honorary members of the society include:

- Peter Ax
- Friedrich Ehrendorfer
- Ernst Mayr

== See also ==
- Systematics Association
- American Society of Plant Taxonomists
- International Association for Plant Taxonomy
- The Linnean Society of London
- Society of Systematic Biologists
- Willi Hennig Society
- Systematic and evolutionary biogeography association
- Swiss Systematics Society
