= Systematics Association =

The Systematics Association
- Abbreviation: SystAss
- Formation: May 3, 1937
- Legal status: Registered charity 270429
- Location: United Kingdom
- President: Davide Pisani
- Website: www.systass.org
- Formerly called: Committee on Systematics in Relation to General Biology

The Systematics Association (SystAss for short) is a charitable organisation based in the UK founded in 1937 for the promotion of the study of systematics and taxonomy. It publishes research, organises conferences, and provides competitive research funds for systematics research.

== History ==
The society arose from informal meetings held between Royal Botanic Gardens, Kew & John Innes Horticultural Institute (Merton) staff, leading to the formation of a joint zoological and botanical "Committee on Systematics in Relation to General Biology" on May 3, 1937. The council then changed the name of the organisation to its present form. The original founding council included: Julian Huxley (Chairman), Hampton Wildman Parker (Zoological Secretary), and J. S. L. Gilmour (Botanical Secretary).

== Functions ==
It publishes book volumes on a variety of related topics in the Systematics Association Special Volume Series and a newsletter for members called The Systematist. An annual meeting especially for young researchers is usually held in the UK under its auspices as The Young Systematists' Forum.

== Structure ==
Membership of the society is open to all by subscription. The Association's affairs are managed by a Council consisting of officers and members elected at annual general meetings. The officers are a President, a Secretary, a Meetings Secretary, a Grants & Awards Secretary, a Membership Secretary, a Treasurer, the Editor in Chief, a Newsletter Editor, and a Webmaster.

== See also ==
- American Society of Plant Taxonomists
- Gesellschaft für Biologische Systematik
- International Association for Plant Taxonomy
- The Linnean Society of London
- Society of Systematic Biologists
- Swiss Systematics Society
- Willi Hennig Society
- Systematic and evolutionary biogeography association
