= Swiss Systematics Society =

Swiss scientific society for biological systematics and taxonomy

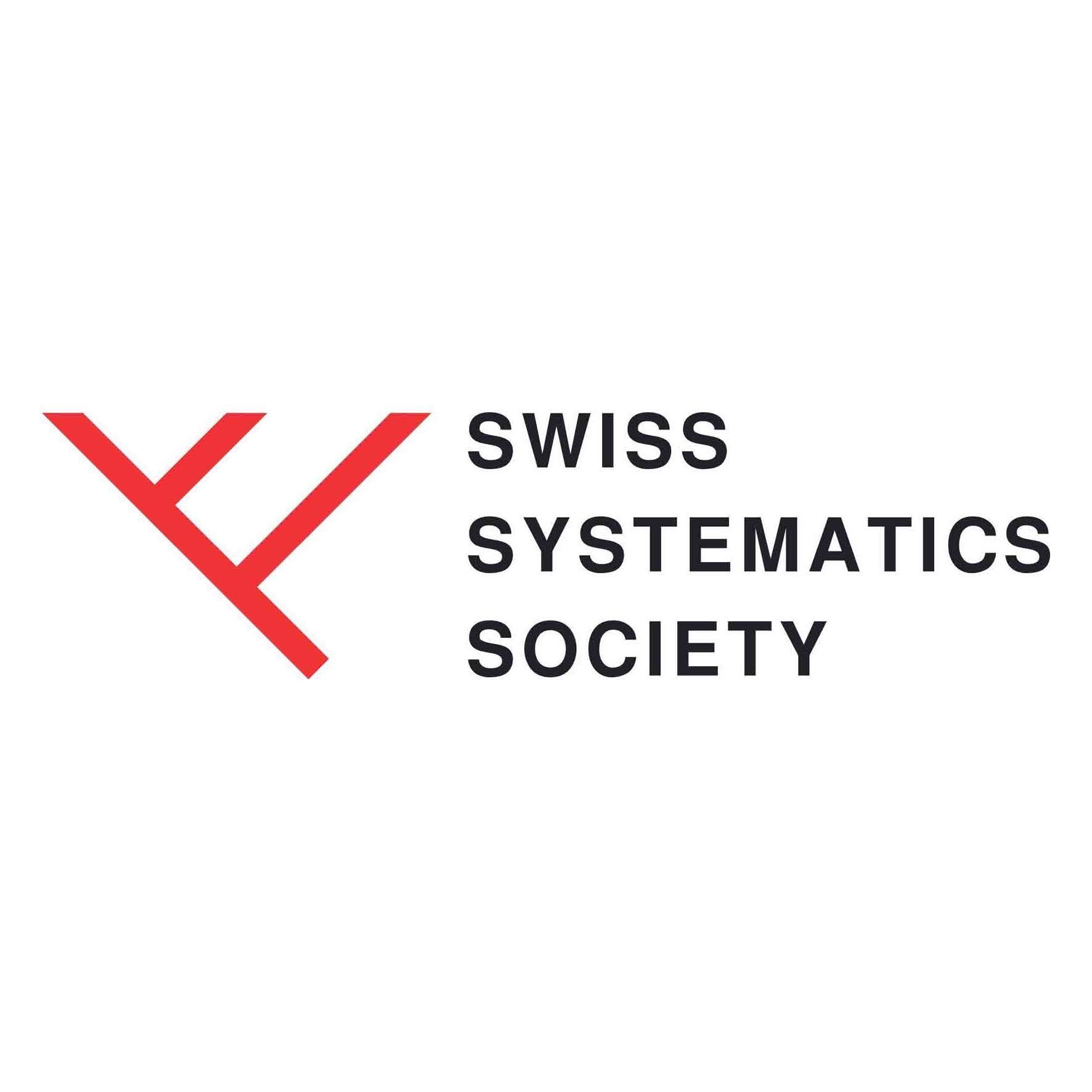
- Abbreviation: SSS
- Formation: 2005
- Type: Scientific society
- Purpose: Systematics & Taxonomy
- Headquarters: Switzerland
- President: Mathieu Perret
- Parent organization: Swiss Academy of Sciences (SCNAT)
- Website: swiss-systematics.ch

The Swiss Systematics Society is a Swiss scientific society dedicated to the promotion of biological systematics and taxonomy. It brings together professional and amateur biologists interested in the classification, evolution, and diversity of organisms, and serves as a national forum for researchers working in systematics-related disciplines.

The society is a member of the Swiss Academy of Sciences (SCNAT).

== History ==
The origins of the Swiss Systematics Society can be traced to 2001, when the Swiss Academy of Sciences established the Task Force Systematik to assess the status of systematic biology in Switzerland. In 2004, the task force recommended the creation of a specialised scientific society to strengthen the discipline nationally.

The society was formally founded in 2005 by Daniel Burckhardt, Philippe Clerc, Jean Mariaux, Winand Brickmann and Hannes Baur.

In 2007, the SSS became a member of SCNAT.

== Activities ==
The society promotes research and education in biological systematics, taxonomy, phylogeny, and biodiversity science. Its objectives include supporting communication among systematists, representing the interests of the discipline within Switzerland, and facilitating international scientific exchange.

Among its regular activities are:

- Since 2008, the Swiss Systematics Society Day, the annual meeting of the society.
- Support for the Swiss Natural History Collection Day.
- Award and grant programmes, including a Best Master Prize and initiatives highlighting newly described species from Switzerland.

The society also participates in European collaborations, including the BioSyst.EU network of systematics societies.

== See also ==
- Systematics Association
- American Society of Plant Taxonomists
- Gesellschaft für Biologische Systematik
- International Association for Plant Taxonomy
- The Linnean Society of London
- Society of Systematic Biologists
- Willi Hennig Society
- Systematic and evolutionary biogeography association
