= Journal of Zhejiang University Science =

Journal of Zhejiang University-Science may refer to any of the following scientific journals:

- Journal of Zhejiang University-Science A (Applied Physics & Engineering)
- Journal of Zhejiang University-Science B (Biomedicine & Biotechnology)
- Journal of Zhejiang University-Science C (Computer & Electronics), current title: Frontiers of Information Technology & Electronic Engineering
