= Journal of Zhejiang University =

Chinese academic journal series

The Journal of Zhejiang University (Traditional Chinese: 浙江大學學報, Simplified Chinese: 浙江大学学报) is a peer-reviewed academic journal series published by the Zhejiang University Press. There are eight sub-journals, covering the fields of science, engineering, medicine, humanities, and social sciences.

== Journals ==
- Journal of Zhejiang University Science A: Applied Physics and Engineering (in collaboration with Springer Science+Business Media)
- Journal of Zhejiang University Science B: Biomedicine & Biotechnology (in collaboration with Springer Science+Business Media)
- Frontiers of Information Technology & Electronic Engineering (Since 2015) (in collaboration with Springer Science+Business Media and the Chinese Academy of Engineering; formerly Journal of Zhejiang University Science C)
- Journal of Zhejiang University: Engineering (in Chinese)
- Journal of Zhejiang University: Agriculture & Life Science (in Chinese)
- Journal of Zhejiang University: Science (in Chinese)
- Journal of Zhejiang University: Medicine/Medical Sciences (in Chinese)
- Journal of Zhejiang University: Humanities & Social Sciences (in Chinese)
