= Biogeographic realm =

Broadest biogeographic division of Earth

Map of the world's biogeographic realms in Miklos Udvardy's system. Nearctic Palearctic Afrotropical Indomalayan Australasian Neotropical Oceanian Antarctic (not shown)

A biogeographic realm is the broadest biogeographic division of Earth's land surface, based on distributional patterns of terrestrial organisms. They are subdivided into bioregions, which are further subdivided into ecoregions. A biogeographic realm is also known as "ecozone", although that term may also refer to ecoregions.

== Description ==
The realms delineate large areas of Earth's surface within which organisms have evolved in relative isolation over long periods of time, separated by geographic features, such as oceans, broad deserts, or high mountain ranges, that constitute natural barriers to migration. As such, biogeographic realm designations are used to indicate general groupings of organisms based on their shared biogeography. Biogeographic realms correspond to the floristic kingdoms of botany or zoogeographic region of zoology.

From 1872, Alfred Russel Wallace developed a system of zoogeographic regions, extending the ornithologist Philip Sclater's system of six regions.

Biogeographic realms are characterized by the evolutionary history of the organisms they contain. They are distinct from biomes, also known as major habitat types, which are divisions of the Earth's surface based on life form, or the adaptation of animals, fungi, micro-organisms and plants to climatic, soil, and other conditions. Biomes are characterized by similar climax vegetation. Each realm may include a number of different biomes. A tropical moist broadleaf forest in Central America, for example, may be similar to one in New Guinea in its vegetation type and structure, climate, soils, etc., but these forests are inhabited by animals, fungi, micro-organisms and plants with very different evolutionary histories.

The distribution of organisms among the world's biogeographic realms has been influenced by the distribution of landmasses, as shaped by plate tectonics over the geological history of Earth.

== Concept history ==
The "biogeographic realms" of Udvardy were defined based on taxonomic composition. The rank corresponds more or less to the floristic kingdoms and zoogeographic regions.

The usage of the term "ecozone" is more variable. Beginning in the 1960s, it was used originally in the field of biostratigraphy to denote intervals of geological strata with fossil content demonstrating a specific ecology. In Canadian literature, the term was used by Wiken in macro-level land classification, with geographic criteria (see Ecozones of Canada). Later, Schultz would use it with ecological and physiognomical criteria, in a way similar to the concept of biome.

In the Global 200/WWF scheme, originally the term "biogeographic realm" in Udvardy sense was used. However, in a scheme of BBC, it was replaced by the term "ecozone".

== Terrestrial biogeographic realms ==
=== WWF / Global 200 biogeographic realms ===
The World Wildlife Fund scheme is broadly similar to Miklos Udvardy's system, the chief difference being the delineation of the Australasian realm relative to the Antarctic, Oceanic, and Indomalayan realms. In the WWF system, the Australasia realm includes Australia, Tasmania, the islands of Wallacea, New Guinea, the East Melanesian Islands, New Caledonia, and New Zealand. Udvardy's Australian realm includes only Australia and Tasmania; he places Wallacea in the Indomalayan Realm, New Guinea, New Caledonia, and East Melanesia in the Oceanian Realm, and New Zealand in the Antarctic Realm.

Biogeographic realm	Area		Lands included
Biogeographic realm	million square kilometres	million square miles	Lands included
Palearctic	54.1	20.9	The bulk of Eurasia and North Africa.
Nearctic	22.9	8.8	Greenland and most of North America.
Afrotropic	22.1	8.5	Trans-Saharan Africa, Madagascar and Arabia.
Neotropic	19.0	7.3	South America, Central America, the Caribbean, South Florida and the Falkland Islands.
Australasia	7.6	2.9	Australia, Melanesia, New Zealand, Lesser Sunda Islands, Sulawesi, Maluku Islands and the neighbouring islands. The northern boundary of this zone is known as the Wallace Line.
Indomalaya	7.5	2.9	The Indian subcontinent, Southeast Asia, southern China and most of the Greater Sunda Islands.
Oceania	1.0	0.39	Polynesia (except New Zealand), Micronesia, and the Fijian Islands.
Antarctic	0.3	0.12	Antarctica, Alexander Island, South Georgia and the South Sandwich Islands.

The Palearctic and Nearctic are sometimes grouped into the Holarctic realm.

=== Morrone biogeographic kingdoms ===
Following the nomenclatural conventions set out in the International Code of Area Nomenclature, Morrone defined the next biogeographic kingdoms (or realms) and regions:

- Holarctic kingdom Heilprin (1887)
  - Nearctic region Sclater (1858)
  - Palearctic region Sclater (1858)
- Holotropical kingdom Rapoport (1968)
  - Neotropical region Sclater (1858)
  - Ethiopian region Sclater (1858)
  - Oriental region Wallace (1876)
- Austral kingdom Engler (1899)
  - Cape region Grisebach (1872)
  - Andean region Engler (1882)
  - Australian region Sclater (1858)
  - Antarctic region Grisebach (1872)
- Transition zones:
  - Mexican transition zone (Nearctic–Neotropical transition)
  - Saharo-Arabian transition zone (Palearctic–Ethiopian transition)
  - Chinese transition zone (Palearctic–Oriental transition zone transition)
  - Indo-Malayan, Indonesian or Wallace's transition zone (Oriental–Australian transition)
  - South American transition zone (Neotropical–Austral transition)

== Freshwater biogeographic realms ==
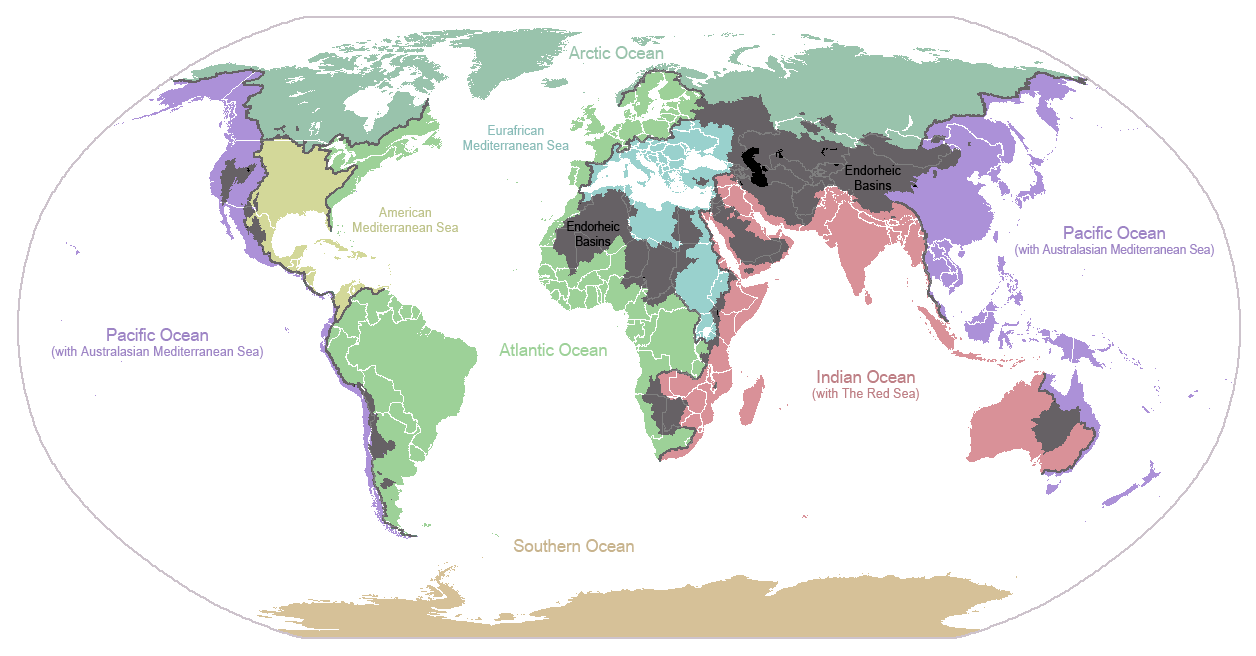
Major continental divides, showing drainage into the major oceans and seas of the world – grey areas are endorheic basins that do not drain to the ocean

The applicability of Udvardy scheme to most freshwater taxa is unresolved.

The drainage basins of the principal oceans and seas of the world are marked by continental divides. The grey areas are endorheic basins that do not drain to the ocean.

== Marine biogeographic realms ==
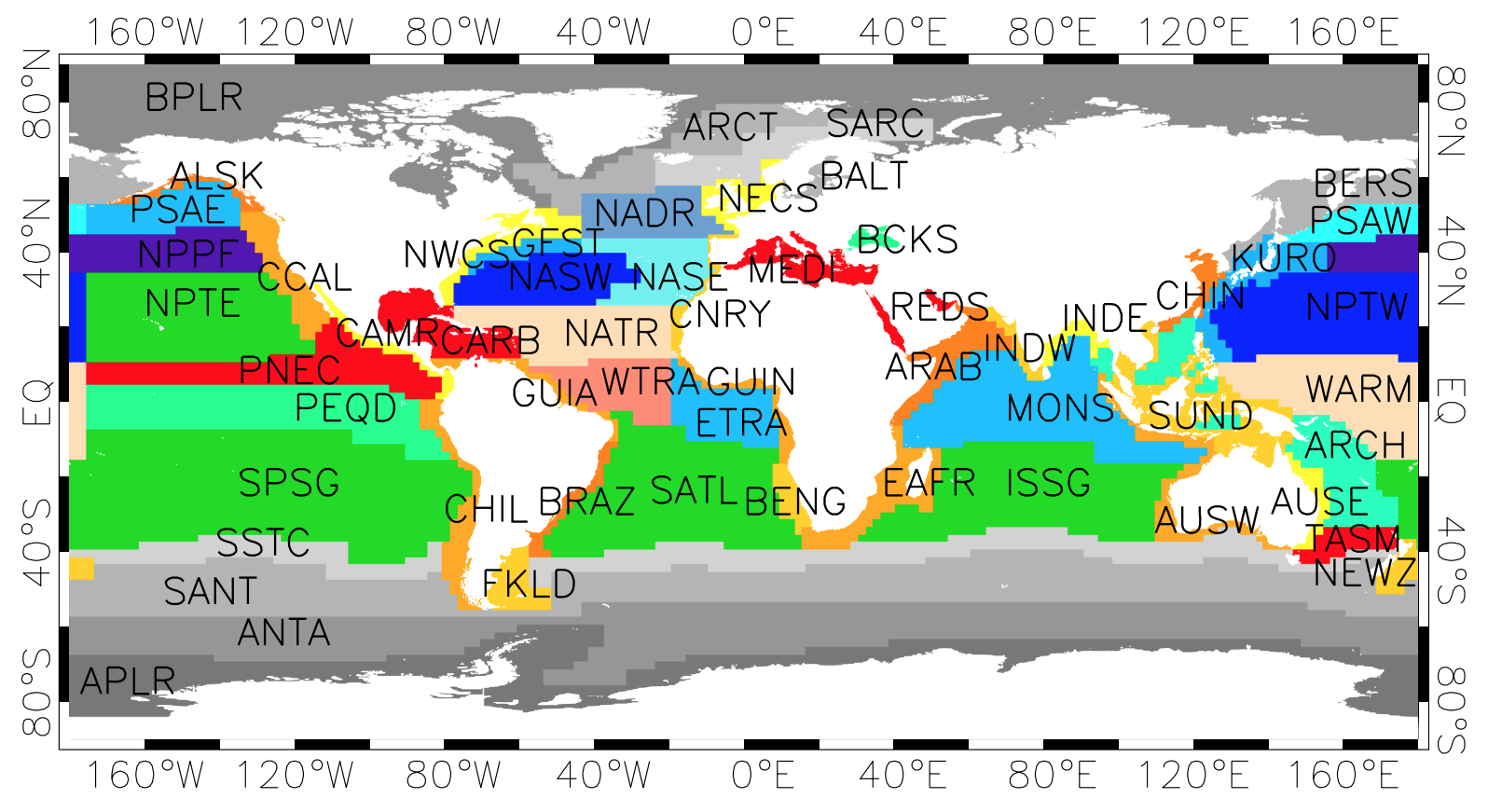
Longhurst biogeographic provinces

According to Briggs and Morrone:

- Indo-West Pacific region
- Eastern Pacific region
- Western Atlantic region
- Eastern Atlantic region
- Southern Australian region
- Northern New Zealand region
- Western South America region
- Eastern South America region
- Southern Africa region
- Mediterranean–Atlantic region
- Carolina region
- California region
- Japan region
- Tasmanian region
- Southern New Zealand region
- Antipodean region
- Subantarctic region
- Magellan region
- Eastern Pacific Boreal region
- Western Atlantic Boreal region
- Eastern Atlantic Boreal region
- Antarctic region
- Arctic region

According to the WWF scheme:

- Arctic realm
- Temperate Northern Atlantic realm
- Temperate Northern Pacific realm
- Tropical Atlantic realm
- Western Indo-Pacific realm
- Central Indo-Pacific realm
- Eastern Indo-Pacific realm
- Tropical Eastern Pacific realm
- Temperate South America realm
- Temperate Southern Africa realm
- Temperate Australasia realm
- Southern Ocean realm

== See also ==
- Biome
- Cosmopolitan distribution
- Ecotone
- Phytochorion and World Geographical Scheme for Recording Plant Distributions, used in botany
