= Neozealandia =

Neozealandia is a biogeographic province of the Antarctic Realm according to the classification developed by Miklos Udvardy in 1975.

== Concept ==
Neozealandia consists primarily of the major islands of New Zealand, including North Island and South Island, as well as Chatham Island. The southernmost areas of Neozealandia overlap with the Insulantarctica province, which includes the New Zealand Subantarctic Islands.

Both New Zealand and the New Zealand Subantarctic Islands are remnants of a submerged subcontinent known as Zealandia, which gradually submerged itself beneath the sea after breaking off from the Gondwanan land masses of Antarctica and Australia. Due to isolation, the entire Zealandia archipelago has remained virtually free of mammals (except for bats and a few others) and invasive alien species. Since only very few mammals and other alien species have actually colonized the islands of the Neozealandia province over the millions of years, the flora and fauna on most of the islands, including those of New Zealand itself, have remained almost exactly the same as they were when the original Gondwana supercontinent existed.

A couple of tuatara species survive in small numbers on small islets adjacent to New Zealand. Also, New Zealand has vestiges of ancient temperate rain forests with plant species, such as giant club mosses, tree ferns and Nothofagus trees, dating from the time when the Zealandia subcontinent split off from Gondwana. New Zealand grasslands are dominated by vast spreadings of tussock grass fed upon by the native ground parrots. Most of New Zealand's few mammals are like those frequenting Antarctic shores.
