= Sexual dimorphism in human bonding =

Biological differences between men and women in human relationships

Sexual dimorphism in human bonding refers to the sex-based differences in how humans form, maintain, and experience social and emotional bonds, including romantic partnerships, parent-child relationships, friendships and broader social connections. These differences encompass variations in attachment styles, hormonal response patterns, neural processing of social information and behavioral expressions of intimacy and connection. They also relate to human approaches to handling fear and stress. At a very basic level, differences between bonding in men and women originate in the fact that humans are born defenseless and require a great deal of parental investment to survive to sexual maturity, especially in the ancestral environment. The differing male and female roles in providing this investment are said to have conditioned their different bonding "styles" over the course of evolutionary history.

Research across psychology, neuroscience, anthropology, and evolutionary biology has documented various gender differences in human bonding behaviors and underlying neural mechanisms. These differences are understood to arise from complex interactions between biological factors (including hormones, brain structure, and evolutionary pressures), psychological development, and sociocultural influences. The nature and extent of interaction of innate biological features, environmental factors and learned social behaviors is an active area of scientific inquiry and debate. While population-level differences have been identified, substantial overlap exists between sexes, and individual variation within each sex is large relative to differences between sexes.

In neuroscience, research (often based on animal models, such as laboratory rats and the prairie vole) emphasizes the role of specific neuropeptides and neural circuits, such as those involving the hormones oxytocin (OT) and arginine vasopressin (AVP). Research suggests these neuropeptides and their receptors are differentially distributed and regulated in the male and female brain, leading to sex-specific effects on attachment, social reward, and protective behaviors.

== Evolutionary context ==
From an evolutionary standpoint, bonding behaviors are thought to have emerged in the ancestral environment because they enhanced reproductive success through cooperative child-rearing, protection and resource sharing. In 1958, attachment theory was proposed by John Bowlby and Mary Ainsworth as a way to understand the nature of love. They "posited that primate infants develop an emotional attachment to their primary caregivers to protect them from danger and that human infant behavior is also regulated by this emotional strategy. It helps them to build relationships with friends, partners and, later, with their own infants."

This proposition is of relevance not only for humans, but for other social animals as well. The human capacity for attachment, encompassing pair-bonds, parent-child bonds, and peer friendships, is an integrated neural system that has reused and repurposed the basic mammalian attachment capacity developed over millions of years of evolution.

For this reason, much of the neurobiological infrastructure required to support bonding behaviors is thought to be shared across social species. This is why neuroscientists assert the relevance of animal models (eg. rats, prairie voles, sheep and other primates) for generating information about the biology of human bonding. However, while animal models illuminate general principles of mammalian attachment, their neural and behavioral mechanisms cannot be assumed to operate identically in humans. For example, although humans are often classed as a broadly monogamous species, studies in comparative anthropology have shown large differences in the degree of monogamy, depending on local conditions (e.g. conditions influencing the ease with which food can be obtained, with extreme food scarcity favoring monogamy). These studies of sexual dimorphism in mating behavior suggest that, at times, what might be viewed as neurobiologically engrained differences can be overridden by, for example, varying ecological conditions.

=== Parental roles ===
Sexual dimorphism in bonding is thought to reflect different selective pressures on males and females regarding reproductive success in the ancestral environment of evolution. Due to their fundamental role in childbearing and nursing, female bonding mechanisms have a strong initial bias toward parent-infant attachment (OT-driven). However, the role of males in pair bonding and parenting is a complex one, especially in humans. As one neuroscientist states:

...pair bonds in humans, as well as in other mammalian species, are regularly associated with … the bi-parental care of young. The co-occurrence of these behaviors in pair-bonded individuals makes sense when viewed through the lens of evolutionary theory, which suggests, in part, that pair bonding became adaptive under conditions in which additional parental investment was required to ensure the successful rearing of young. Indeed, the same selection pressures that necessitated the presence of both parents for offspring survival would likely facilitate the formation of a partnership between mates and mechanisms through which to maintain this partnership (e.g., mate-guarding).

=== Stress response ===
Seen from an evolutionary perspective, stress is important because the ancestral environment contained numerous sources of threat (for example, predators). Stress responses govern how animals, including humans, respond to these sources of threat. The role of females in this context would have been constrained by pregnancies, nursing and the need to tend to offspring in dangerous situations. Males, on the other hand, would have been in a somewhat better position to engage in either "flight or fight", a phrase typically used to describe threat response options.

Neuroscientists have found evidence that males and females deploy somewhat different neurobiological systems when responding to stress. One study of rats, for example, finds that stress can strengthen social bonds in males while inhibiting them in females, thereby indicating dimorphic stress-attachment regulatory systems in the brain. Another study of artificially induced stress in laboratory rats showed sexual dimorphism in the production of molecules that promote more proactive or aggressive responses to stress — males produced such molecules, but females showed no such chemical response.

== Neurochemical foundations ==
The foundations of human bonding and attachment, as well as for other socially monogamous animals, involve the interaction of neuropeptides and the brain's mesolimbic dopamine (DA) reward system. Neurochemicals can act in tandem with one another — for example, one study of prairie voles indicates that "vasopressin, oxytocin, dopamine and stress peptide signaling facilitate attachment." In addition, studies of prairie voles show that sex-specific mechanisms regulate pair bonding, with vasopressin regulating bonding in males and oxytocin facilitating social attachment in females. In female prairie voles, dopamine also plays a role. For both sexes, the reward circuitry of the brain plays a key role in regulating social attachment, as do cognitive mechanisms that permit social recognition of offspring and mates.

=== Oxytocin ===
Often called the "bonding hormone," oxytocin (OT) is crucial for promoting affiliation, reducing stress, and enhancing the salience of social stimuli in both sexes. It is believed to be more strongly associated with female bonding, particularly maternal–infant attachment and same-sex social support.

In females, OT is fundamentally linked to maternal care and mother-infant bonding and is released in large amounts during childbirth and lactation. Studies suggest OT may be more significant in facilitating familiar-partner preference in females compared to males. Furthermore, warm partner contact has been shown to increase plasma OT levels more in women than in men. In males, OT is implicated in fathering behaviors and romantic attachment, but its primary mechanisms may differ. OT has also been suggested to enhance trust more significantly in males.

=== Vasopressin ===
Arginine vasopressin (AVP) primarily modulates social communication, social investigation, and territorial/aggressive behaviors. In particular, there are consistent differences between monogamous species and polygamous species in the distribution of AVP receptors, and sometimes in the distribution of vasopressin-containing axons, even when closely related species are compared. In males, AVP is strongly associated with mate-guarding and selective aggression toward unfamiliar conspecifics, which is essential for maintaining a pair bond in many species and potentially related to human jealousy. The AVP system parameters (AVP levels and receptor density) are often found to be higher in males in conserved brain regions. In females, AVP's role is less extensively studied. AVP also facilitates partner preference and modulates social memory and emotion regulation, though without the strong male-typical aggressive/territorial bias seen in some species.

=== Dopamine ===
Dopamine pathways are implicated in both male and female bonding, reinforcing the rewarding aspects of social connection. In the language used to discuss the reward system, reward is the attractive and motivational property of a stimulus that induces appetitive behavior (also known as approach behavior) and consummatory behavior. A rewarding stimulus is one that can induce the organism to approach it and choose to consume it or engage in activities related to it.

=== Testosterone ===
Testosterone is the primary male sex hormone and androgen. In humans and most other vertebrates, testosterone is secreted primarily by the testicles of males and, to a lesser extent, the ovaries and placenta of females. The adrenal cortex secretes it in both sexes. On average in adult human males, levels of testosterone are about seven to eight times greater than in adult females.

The hormone is associated with increased aggression, sex drive, dominance, courtship display, and a wide range of other behavioral characteristics. This association is not a one-way street — testosterone influences how a human interacts with his or her environment, but external stimuli, such as threats to social dominance, can cause the body to produce more testosterone. Research also suggests that testosterone can promote prosocial behavior when group cohesion and status gains depend on cooperation.

=== Estrogen ===
Estrogen is a sex hormone responsible for the development and regulation of the female reproductive system and secondary sex characteristics. While estrogen levels are significantly lower in males than in females, estrogens nevertheless play important physiological roles in males. Estrogen is central to female bonding and interacts with oxytocin to strengthen affiliative behaviors, especially those linked to caregiving and empathy.

Estrogens and progesterone typically regulate motivation to engage in sexual behaviour for females in mammalian species, though the relationship between hormones and female sexual motivation is not as well understood. In particular, estrogens have been shown to correlate positively with increases in female sexual motivation, and progesterone has been associated with decreases in female sexual motivation.

== Key neural circuits and receptor distribution ==
The sex-specific effects of OT and AVP are largely determined by the density and distribution of their respective receptors across various brain regions, particularly those involved in reward, emotion, and memory. Because invasive neuroscience on humans is not possible, many of the research findings in this field of neuroscience stem from animal studies (especially prairie voles and laboratory rats).

=== Reward circuitry ===
In both sexes, the formation of social bonds activates the dopamine reward pathway, which includes the Ventral Tegmental Area (VTA) projecting to the Nucleus Accumbens and the Ventral Pallidum. The VTA plays an important role in a number of processes, including reward cognition (motivational salience, associative learning, and positively-valenced emotions) and orgasm. Oxytocin and vasopressin modulate these circuits, linking the presence of a partner to rewarding feelings, thereby reinforcing the attachment behavior. The specific balance and interaction of OT and AVP in these areas exhibit sexually dimorphic patterns.

=== Amygdala ===
The amygdala is known to influence emotional memory and responses in humans and non-human animals. Differences between men and women in this area are well documented. The amygdala is larger in males than in females for children aged 7 to 11, for adult humans, and for adult rats. Men also have a higher concentration of sex hormone receptors in this structure.

There are also functional differences: one study found that, on average, women retain stronger and more vivid memories for emotional events than men. Furthermore, neuroimaging studies show that the amygdala region is responsible for the greater role that visual stimuli play in male sexual behavior compared to female behavior.

=== Hypothalamus and pituitary ===
Both OT and AVP are neuropeptides produced in the hypothalamus and released from the pituitary gland, acting as hormones in the periphery and neuro-modulators in the central nervous system. In these structures, there are clear differences in both structure and function between males and females. Some differences are apparent even in gross neuroanatomy: most notable is the sexually dimorphic nucleus within the preoptic area, in which the differences are subtle changes in the connectivity and chemical sensitivity of particular sets of neurons.

The importance of these differences can be recognized by functional differences between males and females. For instance, males of most species prefer the odor and appearance of females over males, which is instrumental in stimulating male sexual behavior. If the sexually dimorphic nucleus is lesioned, this preference for females by males diminishes. Also, the pattern of secretion of growth hormone is sexually dimorphic (for mice); this is why in many species, the size of adult males is visibly distinct from females.

Although human hypothalami exhibit various sex differences, it is not certain which behaviors are caused, predisposed, or not caused by these. In addition to confounding environmental factors, the hypothalamus also contributes to dimorphic human behaviors where the hypothalamus does not itself cause dimorphism, but rather exhibits conditional, dimorphic responses in the context of broader pathways.

== Caveats ==
Findings from animal studies, including rodents and higher primates, have contributed substantially to understanding the neurobiology of social bonding for humans. Nevertheless, species differ markedly in terms of their social structures, cognitive complexity, and the distribution of oxytocin and vasopressin receptors. Many insights on the biological foundations of bonding derive from experimental procedures performed on animal models that, for ethical reasons, cannot be replicated in humans, so human evidence is often correlational. For this reason, translation of these results to humans requires caution, but may still be useful for shedding light on human attachment processes. In addition, the relatively small amount of direct human experimentation in this area of neuroscience has been conducted in tightly controlled laboratory conditions that may or may not have relevance for human attachment in more natural settings.

Another caveat relates to the use of these neuroscience findings in today's political and social context. These results might be used to imply that women are biologically predisposed to play certain roles in society and in the home, but as one neuroscientist warns:

Biological analyses of human behavior are sometimes misconstrued by social scientists as implying inflexibility or inevitability in human behaviour ... These perceptions constitute unwarranted concerns about biological bases of behaviour. Biology is not so much a destiny as it is a central tendency, but a central tendency that influences and interacts with social, cultural, cognitive and emotional factors, resulting in substantial behavioural flexibility. The last few decades of behavioural research have shown that, just as biology affects behaviour, so behaviour affects biology, in ways ranging from genetic expression to acute responses to stressful circumstances. Rather than viewing social roles and biology as alternative accounts of human behaviour, a more productive theoretical and empirical strategy will be to recognize how biology and social roles are inextricably interwoven to account for the remarkable flexibility of human nature.

== See also ==
- Effects of hormones on sexual motivation
- List of androgens/anabolic steroids
- List of human hormones
- List of regions of the human brain
- Neuroendocrinology
- Male bonding
- Oxytocin (medication)
- Sex differences in cognition
