= Xixi Campus, Zhejiang University =

Zhejiang University campus in Hangzhou, China

- 浙江大学西溪校区
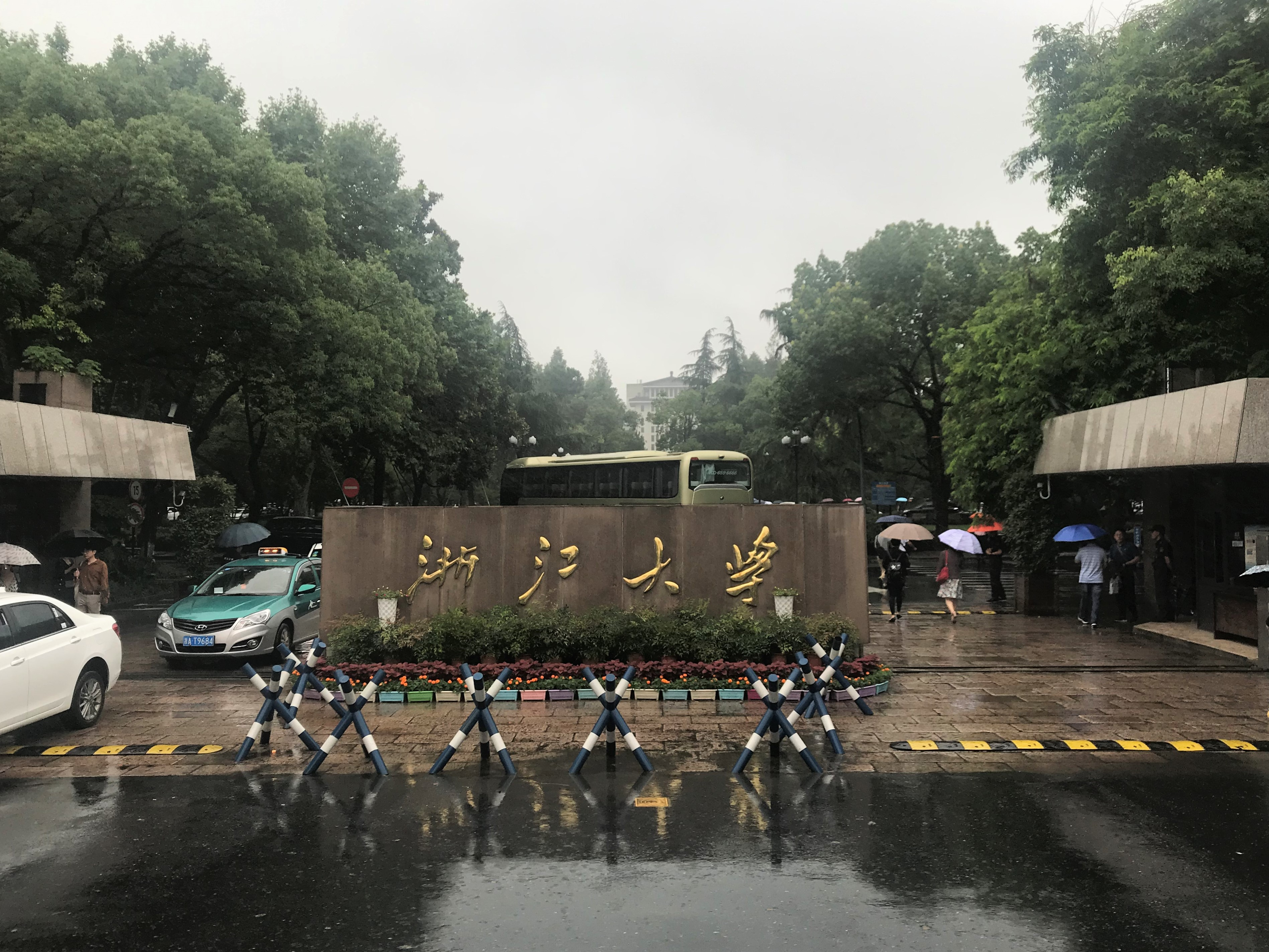
- South gate of the campus in 2019
- Established: 1957; 69 years ago
- Parent institution: Zhejiang University
- Location: 148 Tianmushan Road, Hangzhou, Zhejiang, 310028, China; 30.27652°N 120.13576°E
- Campus: 45.60 hectares (112.7 acres)

Xixi Campus (Traditional Chinese: 西溪校區, Simplified Chinese: 西溪校区) is an urban campus of Zhejiang University in Hangzhou.

It was the campus of Hangzhou University in Hangzhou, Zhejiang Province, until it was merged into Zhejiang University in 1998.

== See also ==
- Zhejiang University Press
