= Biology of human bonding =

Role of neurobiology in human attachment

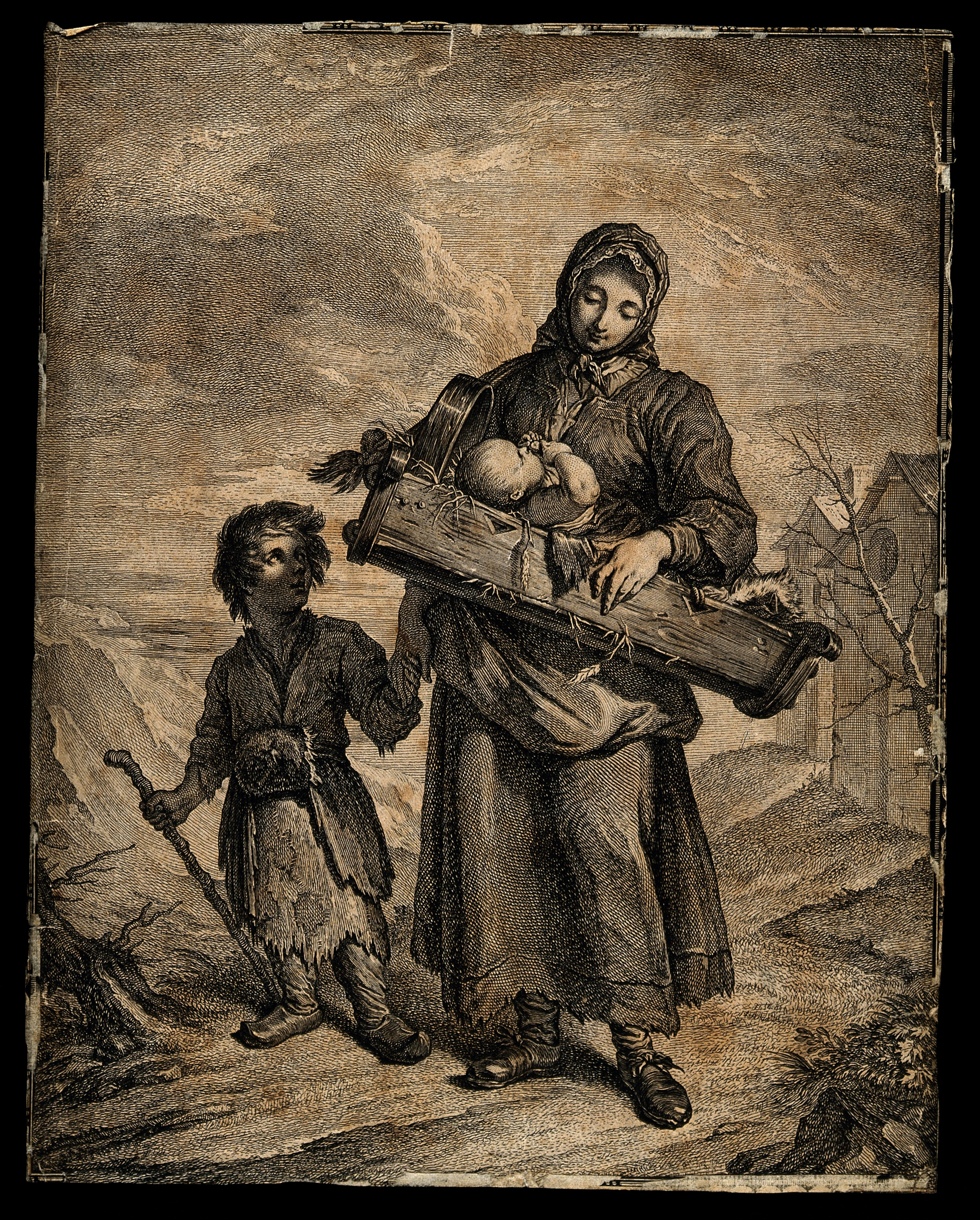
A woman carrying a baby and holding the hand of her small child

Human bonding is the process by which close, enduring interpersonal relationships develop between two or more people. These selective and long-lasting attachments—which include parent-child bonds, romantic pair bonds, and friendships—are fundamental to human survival, development, and well-being. Modern neurobiology views bonding not just as a psychological experience, but also as a set of motivational and emotional states rooted in ancient, conserved mammalian brain systems.

== Evolutionary and developmental context ==
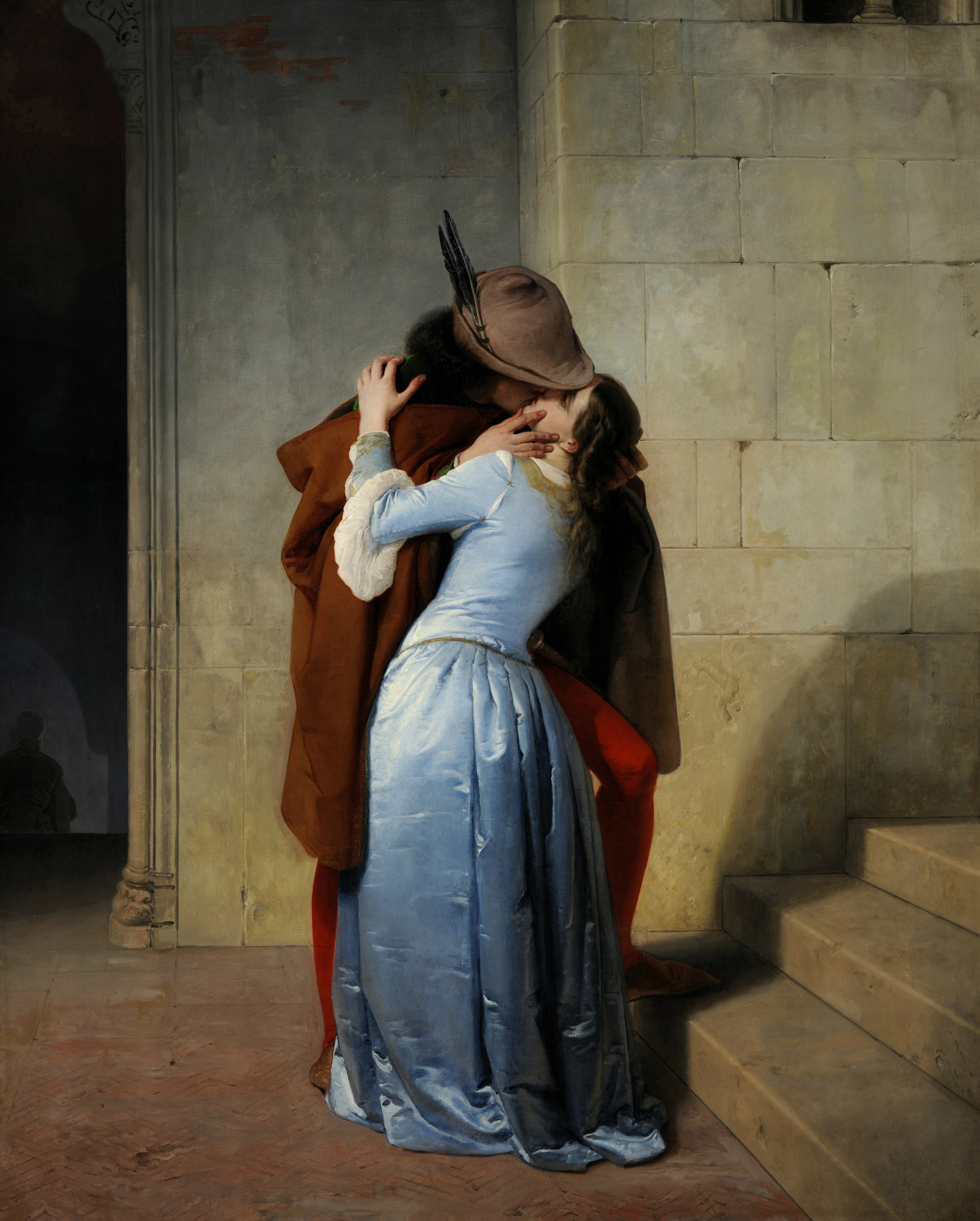
The Kiss, by Francesco Hayez, in the Pinacoteca di Brera, Milan.

It is often said that man is a social animal. Human bonding encompasses a wide range of affiliative behaviors, including parent–child bonding, romantic attachment, friendship, and kinship ties. With technical progress, scientists are now able to examine the neurobiology of the various forms of bonding that enter into play in human societies. These neurobiological mechanisms of connection have played an essential role in survival and social cohesion in the context of human evolution. Such mechanisms are also partially conserved in other mammalian species, though humans exhibit unique complexities due to language, culture, and cognition.

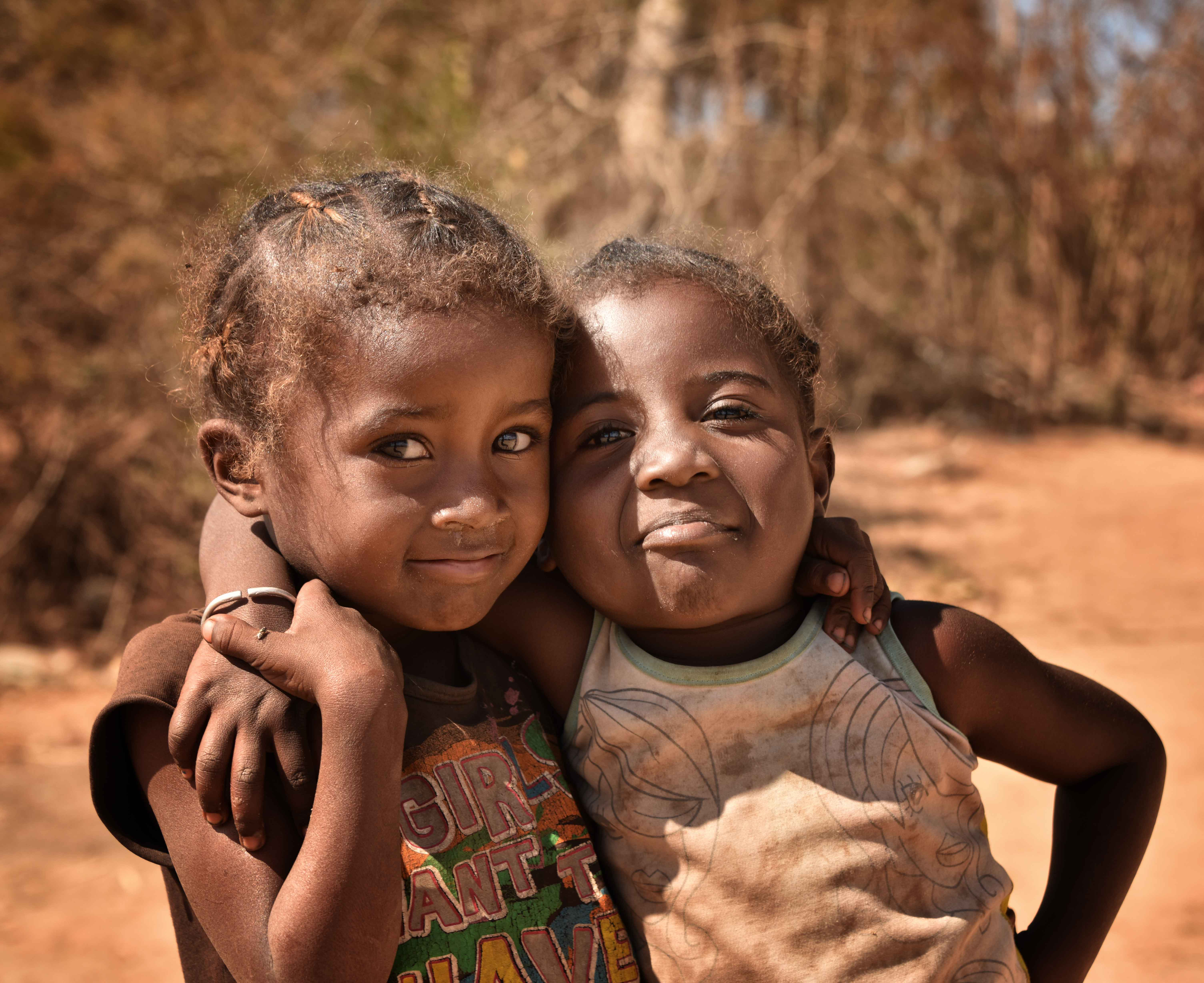
Friends in Madagascar

The neurobiological machinery for human attachment is thought to have evolved from the primal mother-infant bond, which is essential for the survival of altricial (helpless at birth) mammalian young. Under some theories, the human system of maternal love was later repurposed through evolution to facilitate pair bonding (monogamy) and possibly other types of attachment. A meta-analysis of neuro-imaging studies states that evidence “supports the notion that maternal and passionate love share a common evolutionary origin and neurobiological basis in the human brain.”

For example, humanity's broad tendency to develop monogamous male-female pair bonds may trace its origins to the mechanisms for parent-child bonding (though there are wide variations across individuals and cultures regarding monogamy in practice). One neurobiological study using fMRI compares maternal and romantic love. It finds that both types of love "activate [brain] regions that are specific to each, as well as overlapping regions in the brain's reward system that coincide with areas rich in oxytocin and vasopressin receptors. Both [types of love] deactivated a common set of regions associated with negative emotions, social judgement and 'mentalizing', that is, the assessment of other people's intentions and emotions. [The authors] conclude that human attachment ... overcomes social distance by deactivating networks used for critical social assessment and negative emotions, while it bonds individuals through the involvement of the reward circuitry... ." These neurological mechanisms are also thought to promote broader social affiliations, thereby enhancing human ability to function in groups.

== Neurobiology of attachment ==
=== Key neuro-chemicals ===
Human bonding is governed by an integrated "cocktail" of neuropeptides, neurotransmitters, and hormones:

==== Oxytocin ====
Location of the hypothalamus in relation to the pituitary gland and to the rest of the brain

Oxytocin is often dubbed the "love hormone". It is a peptide hormone and neuropeptide normally produced in the hypothalamus and released by the posterior pituitary. It is involved in social-affiliation processes, with effects modulated by context and receptor distribution. It is thought to be critical for promoting prosocial behaviors, trust, and feelings of closeness. More specifically, it plays a role in:

- Parent-Infant bonding: Oxytocin is released in high concentrations during labor, childbirth, and breastfeeding, significantly strengthening the bond between mother and child. It is also activated in fathers through close contact and synchronous interaction with their infants.
- Pair Bonding and trust: In adult relationships, oxytocin release — triggered by physical touch, intimacy, and shared emotional experiences—reinforces emotional connection and trust between partners.

In the area of pair bonding, oxytocin works by dampening the activity of stress-related circuits (like the amygdala) and increases activity in reward-related areas, promoting a state of "immobility without fear" that is conducive to social engagement.

==== Vasopressin ====
Vasopressin, another neuropeptide related to oxytocin, is thought to play a key role, particularly in males, in regulating social and pair-bonding behavior. In addition to its other functions, vasopressin is released directly into the brain from the hypothalamus, and is thought to play an important role in social behavior, sexual motivation and pair bonding, and maternal responses to stress. In close interaction with oxytocin, vasopressin seems to have the following effects:

- Pair-Bonding: Research, notably on the monogamous prairie vole, shows that vasopressin receptors are densely concentrated in the ventral pallidum, an area associated with motivational and reward pathways. Evidence for an effect of AVP on monogamy vs polygamy comes from experimental studies in several animal species, which indicate that the precise distribution of vasopressin and vasopressin receptors in the brain is associated with species-typical patterns of social behavior. In particular, there are consistent differences between monogamous species and polygamous species in the distribution of AVP receptors, and sometimes in the distribution of vasopressin-containing axons, even when closely related species are compared. Activation of these circuits is essential for forming and maintaining selective, monogamous bonds and mate-guarding behavior (which may manifest as jealousy in humans).
- Stress Modulation: Vasopressin can also be involved in stress responses, often supporting more active coping strategies or protective behavior toward a partner or offspring.

==== Dopamine ====
Dopamine is the primary neurotransmitter of the brain's reward and motivation system, the mesolimbic pathway. Although dopamine is often portrayed as the main chemical of pleasure, scientists now believe that dopamine instead confers motivational salience; in other words, dopamine signals the perceived motivational prominence (i.e., the desirability or aversiveness) of an outcome, which in turn propels the organism's behavior toward or away from achieving that outcome.

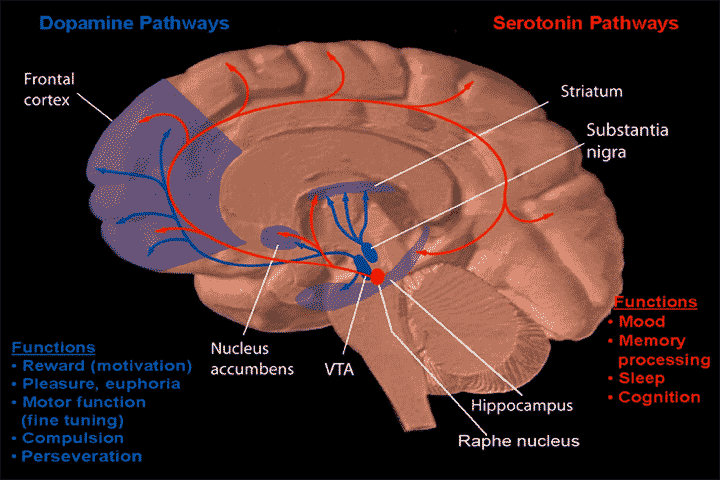
Dopamine and serotonin pathways

For that reason, it is heavily implicated in the phase of intense attraction and early love. When an individual is "in love," viewing or thinking about the partner activates major dopamine-rich areas, including the Ventral Tegmental Area and the Nucleus Accumbens. This activation creates feelings of euphoria, intense motivation, and focused attention, similar to the neurochemical response seen in addiction. The interaction of dopamine with oxytocin is proposed to link the rewarding sensation (dopamine) with the specific social stimuli of the partner (oxytocin), enabling the individual to focus their motivational drive exclusively on the chosen partner.

==== Serotonin ====
Serotonin is a monoamine neurotransmitter with a wide range of functions in both the central nervous system and also peripheral tissues. It is involved in mood, cognition, reward, learning, memory, and several physiological processes. It often shows fluctuating levels during the early, intense stage of romantic attraction. Studies suggest that serotonin levels in people newly in love can resemble those found in individuals with obsessive-compulsive disorder. This may account for the intrusive, all-consuming thoughts and idealization associated with early infatuation. As relationships transition to long-term attachment, serotonin levels typically normalize.

=== Neural circuitry ===
Nucleus accumbens highlighted in green on coronal T1 MRI images

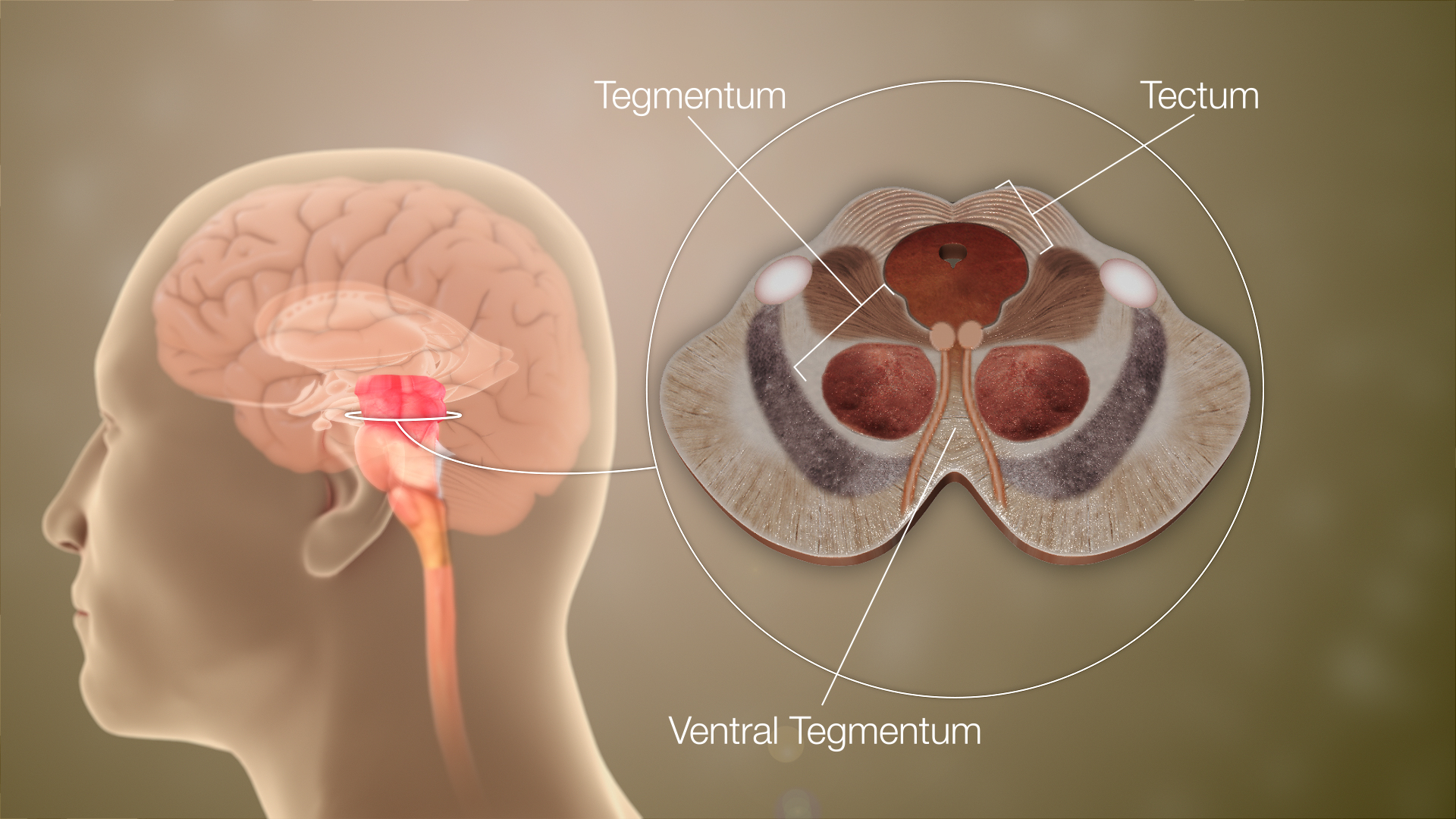
Ventral tegmentum shown in the tegmentum

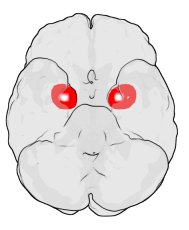
Location of amygdalae in the human brain (view from below, anterior is at top)

Prefrontal cortex of left cerebral hemisphere(shown in red)

Functional neuroimaging studies (fMRI and PET) in humans have identified several brain regions that show consistent changes in activity when subjects are exposed to cues of their attachment figures (e.g., viewing a photo of a romantic partner or child). The formation and maintenance of social bonds are mediated by networks in the limbic system and reward pathways, including:

- Nucleus accumbens and ventral tegmental area: Central to reward and motivation, these regions are activated during attachment-related experiences such as romantic love and maternal care. The nucleus accumbens is one part of the reward system; it plays an important role in processing rewarding stimuli, reinforcing stimuli (e.g., food and water), and those which are both rewarding and reinforcing (addictive drugs, sex, and exercise). The ventral tegmental area is an evolutionarily ancient neural network that links with the nucleus accumbens.
- Amygdala is part of the limbic system and is involved in processing and storing social and emotional information, including trust and fear in relationships.
- Hypothalamus: The hypothalamus controls body temperature, hunger, as well as important aspects of parenting, maternal attachment behaviours and circadian rhythms. It is also important in certain social behaviors, such as sexual and aggressive behaviors.
- Prefrontal cortex: This region of the brain helps manage thinking, emotions and behavior by using executive functions. It supports empathy, social cognition, and regulation of emotional responses, allowing for the maintenance of long-term social bonds.

Functional neuroimaging studies have shown that these regions seem to be activated during both the anticipation and experience of social connection, suggesting that bonding engages mechanisms similar to those involved in other rewarding experiences.

== Stages of human love and bonding ==
Biological anthropologist Helen Fisher published a "groundbreaking study that include the first functional MRI (fMRI) images of individuals in the throes of romantic love." The study posits that romantic love (which she considers distinct from attachment) is a motivation system for choosing and focusing energy on a preferred mating partner. According to Fisher, this brain system evolved for mammalian mate choice, also called "courtship attraction". In this phenomenon, a preferred mating partner is chosen based on a display of physical traits or behaviors. Fisher also includes the attraction to personality traits and other characteristics in her mate choice theory for humans.

In her book, Why We Love: The Nature and Chemistry of Romantic Love, Fisher theorized that romantic love in humans can be divided into three distinct, yet interrelated, neurochemical systems:

- Lust (Sexual Drive): Primarily mediated by sex hormones (testosterone and estrogen). Drives the initial desire for sexual gratification.
- Attraction (Romantic Love) is driven by the surge of monoamines (dopamine and norepinephrine). It is associated with exhilaration, focused attention, and energy expenditure during an intense but typically short-lived period (18 months to 3 years).
- Attachment (Deep Connection): Characterized by high levels of neuropeptides (oxytocin and vasopressin). This promotes long-term security, calm, comfort, and the establishment of stable, enduring relationships, often coinciding with marriage or co-parenting.

== Clinical relevance ==
Understanding the neurobiology of bonding has implications for clinical psychology and psychiatry. It can elucidate both the biological mechanisms of certain disorders, including:

- Social Deficits: Conditions involving social interaction deficits, such as autism spectrum disorder, have been linked to potential irregularities in the oxytocin and vasopressin systems.
- Addiction and Loss: The strong involvement of the dopamine reward system in attachment can help explain why the dissolution of a deep bond (heartbreak or loss) can trigger neural responses similar to withdrawal from addictive substances.
- Early emotional neglect: This type of neglect has been associated with alterations in stress-response mechanisms, including changes in oxytocin-mediated bonding pathways. These adaptations may initially function as survival mechanisms by suppressing pain and emotional distress, but prolonged activation of such systems has been linked to increased vulnerability to anxiety and panic disorders in adulthood.

Exogenous administration of oxytocin is being explored in clinical settings with a view to enhancing social functioning and empathy and reducing anxiety in various patient populations. Nasally administered oxytocin has been reported to reduce fear, possibly by inhibiting the amygdala (which is thought to be responsible for fear responses).

== See also ==
- Sexual dimorphism in human bonding
- Evolutionary biology

== Sources ==
- Fisher, Helen (20 January 2009). Why Him? Why Her?: Finding Real Love By Understanding Your Personality Type. Macmillan Publishers. ISBN 978-0-8050-8292-0.
- Fisher, Helen (2016). Anatomy of Love: A Natural History of Mating, Marriage, and Why We Stray (Completely Revised and Updated). W. W. Norton & Company. ISBN 978-0-393-34974-0. Archived from the original on 18 February 2024.
