= Hangzhou University =

Defunct university in Hangzhou, China

- 杭州大学
- Former names: Hangchow University
- Motto: 求是育英
- Motto in English: Seeking Truth and Nurturing Elites
- Type: Public
- Active: November 26, 1958–September 15, 1998
- Location: 148 Tianmushan Road, Hangzhou, 310028, China; 30.27652°N 120.13576°E
- Campus: 45.60 hectares (112.7 acres); Urban
- Language: Chinese

Chinese name
- Simplified Chinese: 杭州大学
- Traditional Chinese: 杭州大學
- Postal: Hangchow University
Transcriptions
Standard Mandarin
- Hanyu Pinyin: Hángzhōu Dàxué

Hangzhou University (HZU; 杭州大学) was a public university in Hangzhou, Zhejiang, China. The institute was merged into Zhejiang University in 1998.

The university was founded as Zhejiang Teachers College (浙江师范学院) in 1952 by merging the departments of humanities, sciences and education at Hangchow University and Zhejiang University. The name of the university in postal romanisation is the same as Hangchow University run by American missionaries, yet the Chinese names are different.

In September 1996, the university was selected into Project 211. In September 1998, the university was merged into Zhejiang University, with its campus taken over by Zhejiang University as its Xixi Campus.

== History ==
The idea of establishing a Hangzhou University was initially proposed in the Congress of Zhejiang Province in 1920, which was widely echoed by Zhejiang born people including Cai Yuanpei and Jiang Menglin. When Cai Yuanpei visited Hangchow University in March 1927, he said to Hangchow University students and faculty, "I am coming to find a proper site for Hangzhou University but the site has been picked up by you." With the establishment of National Third Chungshan University in 1927, which later was renamed as Zhejiang University, the call for establishing Hangzhou University faded away.

During the 1952 reorganisation of Chinese higher education, part of School of Liberal Arts and School of Sciences at Zhejiang University, the School of Liberal Arts and Sciences at Hangchow University and Zhejiang Education College merged to form Zhejiang Teachers College. In September 1958, Zhejiang Teachers College, located in a newly constructed Xixi campus, merged with the Zhejiang Party School, located in the former Hangchow University campus, now known as the Zhijiang Campus, and formed Hangzhou University as a university specialised in social sciences. Thus, its mathematics, physics, chemistry departments was proposed to go into the Zhejiang College of Engineering and its biology to be incorporated into Zhejiang Agricultural University in July 1960, which didn't come true due to objection from the universities.

In 1960, Hangzhou University became wholly based at Xixi, as the Zhijiang campus became taken by Zhejiang University, where Zhejiang set up three new departments. From 1966 to 1976, the Cultural Revolution impacted the university, with at least ten killed due to political prosecution. Upon request of Hangzhou University professors Song Yunbin, Wang Jiawu and president Chen Jiangong, Zhou Enlai ordered to protect the Wenlan Pavilion, where the Complete Library of the Four Treasuries was protected from being destroyed by the Red Guards. As the national examination for college entrance was resumed in 1977, the university welcomed a new cohort of Class of 1981. Among around 70 graduates of the department of history class of 1981, there were at least 10 real estate tycoons including Song Weiping, Zhou Qingzhi and Xu Guangyue, and a Mao Dun Literature Prize laureate Wang Xufeng. In 1989, the students at Hangzhou University held demonstrations with Zhejiang University at Wulin Square, Hangzhou, to support the democracy movement in Beijing.

As of 1998, Hangzhou University had become a comprehensive public university ranked among top 30 universities in China, with a reputation in its sciences and humanities programs. It was under the administration of Zhejiang Provincial Government. With a student body of 8500, the university was largely a regional teaching university, with one seventh of its students being postgraduate students. In September 1998, the university was merged into Zhejiang University, with its campus taken over by Zhejiang University as its Xixi Campus.

== Campuses ==
The university was initially located at the former site of Hangchow University, which is a protected historic site since 2006. In late 1950s, the university moved to the newly built Xixi Campus until the merger with Zhejiang University in 1998, after which the campus became Xixi Campus of Zhejiang University. The road south to the campus was named after the university's name as Hangda Road. Hangda New Village, the residential area for Hangzhou University faculty, was located at 56 Xixi Road, which has been protected as a Historical and Cultural Street of Hangzhou since September 2021.

== Publications ==
Before the merger, the university has its own publisher, Hangzhou University Press, which was merged into Zhejiang University Press in 1999. The Chinese-language academic journals Journal of Hangzhou University was merged into Journal of Zhejiang University. To be specific, Journal of Hangzhou University: Philosophy And Social Sciences Edition merged with Journal of Zhejiang University: Philosophy And Social Sciences Edition to become Journal of Zhejiang University: Humanities and Social Sciences Edition. Journal of Hangzhou University: Natural Sciences Edition was renamed as Journal of Zhejiang University: Science Edition after the merger.

== Affiliated high school ==
Xuejun High School was the high school Affiliated to Hangzhou University before 1998, which gained independence after the merger. The high school was founded as Hangzhou No. 14 Junior High School in 1956. After the establishment of Hangzhou University in 1958, a new Zhejiang Teachers College was formed, with the school renamed as the High School Affiliated to Zhejiang Teachers College in 1958. With the Zhejiang Teachers College from Hangzhou to Jinhua in 1965, Hangzhou University took the campus of Zhejiang Teachers College, with the high school becoming the High School Affiliated to Hangzhou University in 1965. It was renamed as Xuejun High School in 1970. In 1995, Xuejun High School established the private high school Wenlan High School as its private junior high school. From 1999 to 2002, the junior high school part of Xuejun High School was separated and merged into Wenlan.

== Proposed re-establishment ==
As the 1998 merger reduced top universities in Zhejiang, re-establishment of Hangzhou University has been frequently proposed. In March 2010, Sun Zhonghuan, a Hangzhou University alumnus and major politician proposed that Hangzhou Normal University should be renamed as Hangzhou University. During 2017 Lianghui, Zhao Guangyu, a major Hangzhou politician, proposed a new Hangzhou University that specialises in liberal arts should be established to complement Zhejiang University that specialises in sciences and engineering. In September 2021, a netizen proposes to Zhejiang Gongshang University that Zhejiang Gongshang University should merge with Zhejiang University of Technology to build a new Hangzhou University.
