= Hangzhou Wenlan High School =

Secondary school in Hangzhou, China

Wenlan High School
- 文澜中学
- Tongyi Road, Gongshu District; Hangzhou, Zhejiang; China

Information
- Type: Private
- Established: 1956
- Session: Single-session / Full Day
- Principal: Ren Ji-Chang
- Staff: 327
- Gender: Mixed (Years 1 - 3)
- Age range: 12 - 15
- Enrolment: 1200
- Language: Chinese
- Newspaper: Wenlan
- Website: www.hzwlhs.com

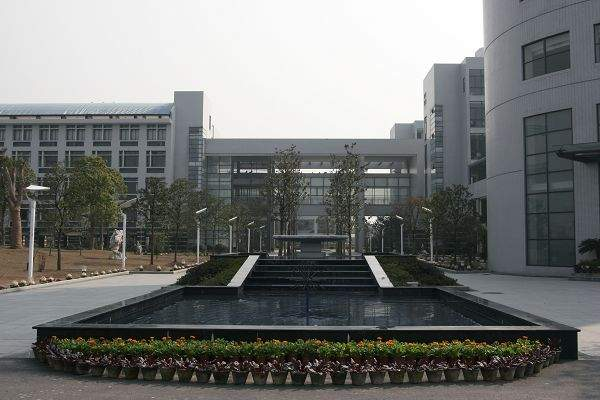

The Wenlan High School is a secondary school located in Hangzhou, Zhejiang Province, China. It was established as High School affiliated to Hangzhou University in 1956. The school was renamed Xuejun High school in 1970. In 2003, the school moved to its current Tongyi Road campus.

The school campus has 9.87 hectares of land, classrooms and laboratories, a boarding school and sporting facilities, with total investment of approximately 135 million yuan.

Wenlan high school was consistently ranked as one of the top schools in Hangzhou, and has produced students who topped in High school entrance examination over the years.

Hangzhou Wenlan High School is now the Junior High School affiliated to Hangzhou Xuejun High School.
