= Alan Cooper (biologist) =

New Zealand evolutionary molecular biologist (born 1966)

- Born: Alan John Cooper; 1966 (age 59–60); Dunedin, New Zealand
- Education: Victoria University of Wellington (PhD)
- Awards: Eureka Prize (2017); South Australian Scientist of the Year (2016); ARC Laureate Fellowship (2014); Royal Society of South Australia Verco Medal (2013); ARC Future Fellowship (2011); ARC Federation Fellowship (2005); Zoological Society of London Medal (2002); Ernst Mayr Award (1995); Walter Fitch Award (1994)
- Scientific career
- Fields: Evolution; Genetics; Ancient DNA; Molecular evolution
- Workplaces: Victoria University Wellington; Smithsonian Institution; University of Oxford; University of Adelaide
- Thesis: Molecular evolutionary studies of New Zealand birds (1994)
- Doctoral advisor: Allan C. Wilson; Svante Pääbo

Alan John Cooper (born 1966) is a New Zealand evolutionary biologist and an ancient DNA researcher. He was involved in several important early ancient DNA studies, such as the first sequencing of moa genomes. He was the inaugural director of both the Henry Wellcome Ancient Biomolecules Centre at the University of Oxford from 2001–2005, and the Australian Centre for Ancient DNA at the University of Adelaide, South Australia from 2005–2019.

== Early life and education ==
Cooper was born in 1966 in Dunedin, New Zealand, and grew up in Wellington, where he was involved in cave exploration and cave rescue at university and regional level. He was awarded a PhD from the Victoria University of Wellington in 1994 for evolutionary studies of New Zealand birds. During his PhD he also worked at the University of California, Berkeley supervised by Allan C. Wilson and Svante Pääbo.

== Career ==
In 1999, Cooper established the Henry Wellcome Ancient Biomolecules Centre at the University of Oxford and in 2002 was made Professor of Ancient Biomolecules at Oxford. In 2004, he was awarded an Australian Research Council (ARC) Federation Fellowship. He resigned from Oxford in 2005, following an internal investigation into allegations that he fabricated data in grant applications. He subsequently moved to the University of Adelaide to establish the Australian Centre for Ancient DNA. At Adelaide, he led the Ancient DNA node of the Genographic Project examining human origins and dispersal from 2005–2010. He was awarded a series of ARC Fellowships: Federation (2005–2010), Future (2011–2014), and Laureate (2014–2019) researching human evolution and climate change.

In December 2019, the University of Adelaide dismissed Cooper, citing "serious misconduct" for bullying staff and students. In January 2020, he filed a legal petition against the university for unfair dismissal. The case was settled out of court in July 2020. In June 2023, Charles Sturt University announced that it had appointed Cooper as professor to its Gulbali Institute for Agriculture, Water and Environment, based in Albury-Wodonga.

=== Research ===
Cooper has published over 30 papers in the journals Nature and Science. In 2000, with Henrik Poinar, he suggested that the standards of much ancient DNA research were insufficient to rule out contamination, especially in studies of ancient humans. In 2001, he used these methods to characterise the first complete mitochondrial genome sequences from extinct species, two New Zealand moa.

Cooper has analysed ancient DNA from extinct species preserved in caves, permafrost areas of Alaska and the Yukon, Antarctica, and sedimentary and archaeological deposits around the world. He has published on the evolutionary history of a range of enigmatic extinct species including: New Zealand moa and Madagascan elephant bird (Aepyornis), the Dodo (Raphus cucullatus), American lion (P. leo atrox) and cheetah-like cat (Miracinonyx), North and South American horses (stilt-legged horse, Hippidion), steppe bison, bears (Arctodus, U. arctos), cave hyenas (Crocuta spelaea), mammoth, and the Falkland Islands wolf (Dusicyon australis). He has also shown that the calcified plaque on the teeth of ancient skeletons can be used to reconstruct the evolution of the human microbiome through time.

In 2021, Cooper and colleagues published a paper in Science, arguing that the extinction of Neanderthals and the appearance of cave paintings could be linked to a geomagnetic excursion approximately 41,000 years ago, dubbed the Laschamp event. The claims were met with scepticism by other experts. Cooper and colleagues’ ideas were later supported by Mukhopadhyay and colleagues in 2025.

== Awards ==
- Eureka Prize (2017)
- South Australian Scientist of the Year (2016)
- ARC Laureate Fellowship (2014)
- Royal Society of South Australia Verco Medal (2013)
- ARC Future Fellowship (2011)
- ARC Federation Fellowship (2004)
- Zoological Society of London Medal (2002)
- Walter Fitch Award (1994) for PhD research into the evolution of New Zealand birds.
- Ernst Mayr Award (1995) for PhD research into the evolution of New Zealand birds.
