= Edward O. Wiley =

American ichthyologist (born 1944)

Wiley, Edward O.
- Born: 15 August 1944 (age 82); Corpus Christi, Texas
- Education: The City University of New York, New York, New York
- Known for: Theoretical work in phylogenetic systematics and ichthyology
- Awards: Gibbs Award
- Scientific career
- Fields: Zoology
- Workplaces: University of Kansas, Department of Ecology and Evolutionary Biology and Research Associate, Division of Fishes, National Museum of Natural History
- Doctoral advisor: Donn Rosen

Edward Orlando Wiley III is the curator emeritus of ichthyology at the University of Kansas Biodiversity Institute and professor of systematics and evolution for the Department of Ecology and Evolutionary Biology at the University of Kansas. His master's adviser was Darrell Hall, of Sam Houston State University (retired), and his doctoral advisor was Donn E. Rosen, of the American Museum of Natural History (deceased). Wiley has published extensively in topics related to phylogenetic systematics, is a past president of the Society of Systematic Biology (then Zoology) and was involved in the founding of the Willi Hennig Society. Wiley is known for building on and establishing conceptual advances in the evolutionary species concept, first formulated by George Gaylord Simpson. Wiley defines an evolutionary species as:

"A species is a lineage of ancestral descendant populations which maintains its identity from other such lineages and which has its own evolutionary tendencies and historical fate."

Wiley received the Robert H. Gibbs Jr. Memorial Award for Excellence in Systematic Ichthyology from the American Society of Ichthyologists and Herpetologists in 2004 for his work on the evolution of fishes.

== Publications (selected) ==
- Betancur-R, R., Wiley, E.O., Arratia, G. et al. 2017. Phylogenetic classification of bony fishes. BMC Evol Biol 17, 162. https://doi.org/10.1186/s12862-017-0958-3
- N.I. Holcroft, E.O. Wiley. 2015. Variation in the Posttemporal-Supracleithrum Articulation in Euteleosts. Copeia 103 (4), 751-770.
- Wiley, E.O., A.M. Fuiten, M.H. Doosey, B.K. Lohman, C. Merkes, M. Azuma 2015. The caudal skeleton of the zebrafish, Danio rerio, from a phylogenetic perspective: a polyural interpretation of homologous structures. Copeia 103 (4), 740-750.
- Doosey, M.H., E.O. Wiley 2015. Epural bones in teleost fishes: a problem of phylogenetic homology. Ichthyological Research 62 (2), 131-144.
- Davis, M.P., Holcroft, N.I., Wiley, E.O., Sparks, J.S., and Smith, W.L. 2014. Species-specific bioluminescence facilitates speciation in the deep sea. Marine Biology 161: 1139-1148.
- R Betancur-R, R., R. E. Broughton, E. O. Wiley, K. Carpenter, J. A. López, et al. 2013. The tree of life and a new classification of bony fishes. PLoS Curr 5, 1-33.
- Bernardi G., Wiley E.O., Mansour H., Miller M.R., Orti G., Haussler D., O'Brien S.J., Ryder O.A., Venkatesh B. 2012. The fishes of Genome 10K. Mar Genomics. 2012 Sep;7:3-6. doi: 10.1016/j.margen.2012.02.002. Epub 2012 Mar 24.
- Wong, P. B. Y, E.O. Wiley, W.E. Johnson, O.A. Ryder, S.J. O’Brien, D. Haussler, K.-P. Koepfli, M.L. Houck, P. Perelman, G. Mastromonaco, A.C. Bentley, B. Venkatesh, Y. Zhang, R.W. Murphy and G10KCOS11. 2012. Tissue sampling methods and standards for vertebrate genomics. GigaScience 2012, 1:8 doi:10.1186/2047-217X-1-8.
- Wiley, E. O., P. Chakrabarty, M.T. Craig, M. P. Davis, N.I. Holcroft, R. L. Mayden & W. L. Smith. 2011. Will the real phylogeneticists please stand up? Zootaxa 2946: 7-16.
- Martin, J., D. Blackburn, and E. O. Wiley. Are node-based and stem-based clades equivalent? Insights from graph theory. 2010. PLoS Curr. 2010 November 18; 2: RRN1196. doi:10.1371/currents.RRN1196.
- Wiley, E. O. 2010. Why tree are important. Evol. Edu. Outreach 3(4): 499-505.
- Wiley, E. O. and G. D. Johnson. 2010. A teleost classification based on monophyletic groups. In: Nelson, J. S., H.-P. Schultze and M. V. h. Wilson (eds.): Origin and Phylogenetic Relationships of Teleosts. Verlag Dr. Pfiel, Munich: 123-182.
- Wiley, E. O. 2010. Why tree are important. Evol. Edu. Outreach 3(4): 499-505.
- Martin, J., D. Blackburn, and E. O. Wiley. Are node-based and stem-based clades equivalent? Insights from graph theory. PLoS Curr. 2010 November 18; 2: RRN1196. doi:10.1371/currents.RRN1196.
- Holcroft, N. I. and E. O. Wiley. 2008. Acanthuroid relationships revisited: a new nuclear gene-based analysis that incorporates tetraodontiform representatives. Ichthyol. Res. 55:274–283.
- Wiley, E. O. 2008. Homology. Identity and transformation. In: Arratia, G., H.-P. Schultze and M. V. h. Wilson (eds.): Mesozoic fishes 4: Homology and Phylogeny. Verlag Dr. Pfiel, Munich: 9–21.
- Miya, M., N. I. Holcroft, T.P. Satoh, M. Yamaguchi, M. Nishida & E.O. Wiley. 2007. Mitochondrial genome and a nuclear gene indicate a novel phylogenetic position of deep-sea tube-eye fish (Stylephoridae). Ichthyological Research 54:323–332.
- Wiley, E. O. 2007. Species concepts and their importance in fisheries management and research. Trans. Amer. Fisheries Soc. 136(4):1126–1135.
- Wiley, E. O. 2007. Hennig, (Emil Hans) Willi. New Dictionary of Scientific Biography (Koeretge, N., ed.). Charles Scribner's Sons., NY. (reviewed by Hennig's son, Wolfgang Hennig).
- Chen, P. E. O. Wiley, and K. M. McNyset. 2007. Ecological niche modeling as a predictive tool: silver and bighead carps in North America. Biological Invasions 9:43–51.
- Chen, P., E. O. Wiley, and K. M. McNyset. 2006. Ecological niche modeling as a predictive tool: Silver and bighead carps in North America. Biological Invasions (2006): 9pp. R. (Electronic) https://doi.org/10.1007%2Fs10530-006-9004-x)
- Pramuk, J. B., M. J. Grose, A. L. Clarke, E. B. Greenbaum, E. Bonaccorso, J. M. Guayasamin, A. H. Smith, B. W. Benz, B. R. Harris, E. Siegfreid, Y. R. Reid, N. I. Holcroft, and E. O. Wiley. 2006. Phylogeny of finescale shiners of the genus Lythrurus (Cypriniformes: Cyprinidae) inferred from four mitochondrial genes. Mol. Phylo. Evol.
- Wiley, E. O., K. M. McNyset, A. T. Peterson, C. R. Robins, and A. M. Stewart. 2003. Niche modeling and geographic range predictions in the marine environment using a machine-learning algorithm. Oceanography 16(3):120–127.
- Wiley, E. O., and R. L. Mayden. 1985. Species and speciation in phylogenetic systematics, with examples from the North American fish fauna. Ann. Missouri Bot. Gard. 72:596–635.
- Wiley, E. O. 1978a. The evolutionary species concept reconsidered. Syst. Zool. 27:17–26.
- Wiley, E. O. 1976. The systematics and biogeography of fossil and Recent gars (Acintopterygii: Lepisosteidae). Misc. Publ. Mus. Nat. Hist. Univ. Kansas 64:1–111.

=== Books ===
- Wiley, E. O. 1981. Phylogenetics. The Theory and Practice of Phylogenetic Systematics. Wiley-Interscience, New York. 439pp. (Translated into Japanese by Masaki Miya in 1991.
- Wiley, E. O., D. Siegel-Causey, D. R. Brooks, and V. A. Funk. 1991. The Compleat Cladist, A Primer of Phylogenetic Systematics. Spec. Publ., Museum of Natural History, University of Kansas. 158pp. (Translated into Japanese and Chinese)
- Hocutt, C. H., and E. O. Wiley (eds.). 1986. The Zoogeography of North American Freshwater Fishes. Wiley-Interscience, NY. 865 pp.
- Brooks, D. R., and E. O. Wiley. 1988. Evolution as Entropy. Second Edition. University of Chicago Press, Chicago. 415pp.
- Wiley, E. O. and B. S. Lieberman 2011. Phylogenetics. The Theory and Practice of Phylogenetic Systematics. Second edition. Wiley-Blackwell, Hoboken, New Jersey. 406 pp.

=== Astronomical Papers ===
- David Rose, Thomas C. Smith, Alex Teiche, Richard Harshaw, Daniel Wallace, Eric Weise, Edward O. Wiley, Grady Boyce, Patrick Boyce, Detrick Branston, Kayla Chaney, R. Kent Clark, Chris Estrada, Reed Estrada, Thomas Frey, Wayne Green, Nathalie Haurberg, Greg Jones, John Kenney, Sheri Loftin, Izak McGieson, Rikita Patel, Josh Plummer, John Ridgely, Mark Truebood, Don Westergren, and Paul Wren. 2015. Kitt Peak Speckle Interferometry of Close Visual Binary Stars. JDSO 11(1s): 234.
- Richard Harshaw, Gregory Jones, Edward O. Wiley, Pat Boyce, Detrick Branston, David Rowe, and Russell M. Genet. 2015. Potential of the McMath-Pierce 1.6-Meter Solar Telescope for Speckle Interferometry. JDSO 11(1s): 289.
- Edward O. Wiley, Richard Harshaw, Gregory Jones, Detrick Branston, Patrick Boyce, David Rowe, John Ridgely, Reed Estrada, and Russell M. Genet. 2015. Close Binary Star Speckle Interferometry on the McMath-Pierce 0.8-Meter Solar Telescope. JDSO 11(1s): 302.
- Wiley, E. O. 2015. Autocorrelation techniques with small telescopes with comments on lucky imaging. In: Double Star Astrometry. Collaborations, Implementations, and Advances Techniques. (Weise, E., Genet, R. and Wallen, V., eds.). Collins Foundation Press, Santa Margarita, CA: 123-138.
- E. O. Wiley and F. M. Rica. 2015. Dynamic Studies of Struve Double Stars: STF4 and STF 236AB Appear Gravitationally Bound. JDSO 11(1): 2.
- E. O. Wiley. 2014. Yankee Tank Creek Observatory Reports No. 1: Forty-One Measures from 2012. jDSO 10(1): 96.
- E. O. Wiley. 2013. A Pixel Correlation Technique for Smaller Telescopes to Measure Doubles. JDSO 9(2); 142.
- E. O. Wiley. 2012. Measures and Relative Motions of Some Mostly F. G. W. Struve Doubles. JDSO 8(2): 81.
- E. O. Wiley. 2010. Relative Motion of the WDS 05110+3203 STF 648 System, With a Protocol for Calculating Relative Motion. JDSO 6(3): 217.
- E.O. Wiley. 2009. Observations of 4th and 5th Hour Doubles. JDSO 5(2): 119.
- E. O. Wiley. 2009. Neglected Double Observations for 2006 No. 5: 22nd and 23rd Hour Doubles. JDSO 5(3): 119.
