= Evolutionary biology =

Study of the evolution of life

Evolutionary biology is a subfield of biology that analyzes the four mechanisms of evolution: natural selection, mutation, genetic drift, and gene flow. Natural selection was independently discovered as the engine of evolution by Charles Darwin and Alfred Russel Wallace, based on patterns in the geographic distribution of species. Gregor Mendel discovered the laws of heredity. R. A. Fisher unified Darwin and Mendel in the modern synthesis.

The investigational range of current research has widened to encompass the genetic architecture of adaptation, molecular evolution, and the different forces that contribute to evolution, such as sexual selection, genetic drift, and biogeography. The newer field of evolutionary developmental biology ("evo-devo") investigates how embryogenesis is controlled, thus yielding a wider synthesis that integrates developmental biology with the fields of study covered by the earlier evolutionary synthesis. Evolution accounts for the unity and diversity of life on Earth; Theodosius Dobzhansky famously said that nothing in biology makes sense without it.

== Overview ==
Evolutionary biology explains diversity between species by analyzing changes in a few individuals within a population over multiple generations. The purpose of this subfield is to determine how genetic variation develops, how it is inherited, and how the evolutionary mechanisms shape a population's genetic composition. Researchers study the traits of organisms to identify which characteristics enhance or reduce survival and reproduction. Advantageous traits tend to be passed on to offspring, contributing to evolutionary change as those traits become more common.

These processes are studied at different levels of complexity from observing features in living or fossilized species to analyzing DNA genomic sequencing between species.

== History ==
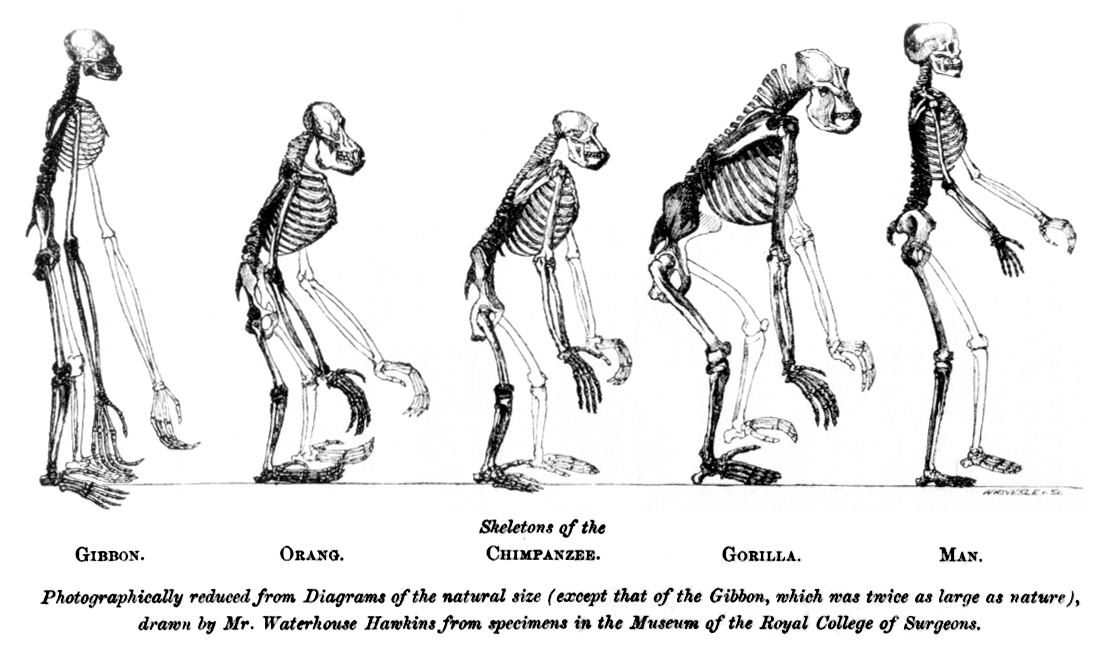
This illustration, a precursor to The March of Progress, appeared as the frontispiece to Thomas Henry Huxley's book Evidence as to Man's Place in Nature (1863). Huxley applied Darwin's ideas to humans, using comparative anatomy to show that humans and apes had a common ancestor.

The idea of evolution by natural selection was proposed by Charles Darwin in 1859, but evolutionary biology, as an academic discipline in its own right, emerged during the period of the modern synthesis in the 1930s and 1940s.

Many biologists have contributed to shaping the modern discipline of evolutionary biology. Theodosius Dobzhansky and E. B. Ford established an empirical research programme. Ronald Fisher, Sewall Wright, and J. B. S. Haldane created a sound theoretical framework. Ernst Mayr in systematics, George Gaylord Simpson in paleontology, and G. Ledyard Stebbins in botany helped to form the modern synthesis. James Crow, Richard Lewontin, Dan Hartl, Marcus Feldman, and Brian Charlesworth trained a generation of evolutionary biologists.

== Subfields ==
Evolution is the central unifying concept in biology. Biology can be divided into various ways. One way is by the level of biological organization, from molecular to cell, organism to population. Another way is by perceived taxonomic group, with fields such as zoology, botany, and microbiology, reflecting what was once seen as the major divisions of life. A third way is by approaches, such as field biology, theoretical biology, experimental evolution, and paleontology. These alternative ways of dividing up the subject have been combined with evolutionary biology to create subfields like evolutionary ecology and evolutionary developmental biology.

More recently, the merge between biological science and applied sciences gave birth to new fields that are extensions of evolutionary biology, including evolutionary robotics, engineering, algorithms, economics, and architecture. The basic mechanisms of evolution are applied directly or indirectly to come up with novel designs or solve problems that are difficult to solve otherwise. The research generated in these applied fields, contribute towards progress, especially from work on evolution in computer science and engineering fields such as mechanical engineering.

In evolutionary developmental biology, scientists look at how the different processes in development play a role in how a specific organism reaches its current body plan. The genetic regulation of ontogeny and the phylogenetic process is what allows for this kind of understanding of biology. By looking at different processes during development, and going through the evolutionary tree, one can determine at which point a specific structure came about.

== Research topics ==
Research in evolutionary biology covers many topics and incorporates ideas from diverse areas, such as molecular genetics and mathematical and theoretical biology. Some fields of evolutionary research try to explain phenomena that were poorly accounted for in the modern evolutionary synthesis. These include speciation, the evolution of sexual reproduction, the evolution of cooperation, the evolution of ageing, and evolvability.

Some evolutionary biologists ask the most straightforward evolutionary question: "what happened and when?". This includes fields such as paleobiology, where paleobiologists and evolutionary biologists, including Thomas Halliday and Anjali Goswami, studied the evolution of early mammals going far back in time during the Mesozoic and Cenozoic eras (between 299 million to 12,000 years ago). Other fields related to generic exploration of evolution ("what happened and when?" ) include systematics and phylogenetics.

The modern evolutionary synthesis was devised at a time when the molecular basis of genes was unknown. Today, evolutionary biologists try to determine the genetic architecture underlying visible evolutionary phenomena such as adaptation and speciation. They seek answers to questions such as which genes are involved, how interdependent are the effects of different genes, what do the genes do, and what changes happen to them (e.g., point mutations vs. gene duplication or even genome duplication). They try to reconcile the high heritability seen in twin studies with the difficulty in finding which genes are responsible for this heritability using genome-wide association studies. The modern evolutionary synthesis involved agreement about which forces contribute to evolution, but not about their relative importance.

== Journals ==
Some scientific journals specialise exclusively in evolutionary biology as a whole, including the journals Evolution, Journal of Evolutionary Biology, and BMC Evolutionary Biology. Some journals cover sub-specialties within evolutionary biology, such as the journals Systematic Biology, Molecular Biology and Evolution and its sister journal Genome Biology and Evolution, and Cladistics.

Other journals combine aspects of evolutionary biology with other related fields. For example, Molecular Ecology, Proceedings of the Royal Society of London Series B, The American Naturalist and Theoretical Population Biology have overlap with ecology and other aspects of organismal biology. Overlap with ecology is also prominent in the review journals Trends in Ecology and Evolution and Annual Review of Ecology, Evolution, and Systematics. The journals Genetics and PLoS Genetics overlap with molecular genetics questions that are not obviously evolutionary in nature.

== See also ==
- On the Origin of Species
- Comparative anatomy
- Computational phylogenetics
- Evolutionary anachronism
- Evolutionary computation
- Evolutionary dynamics
- Evolutionary neuroscience
- Evolutionary physiology
- Macroevolution
- Phylogenetic comparative methods
- Quantitative genetics
- Selective breeding
- Speculative evolution
- Taxonomy (biology)
- Biology of human bonding
