= Sun Zhonghuan =

Chinese politician

Sun Zhonghuan 孙忠焕

Mayor of Hangzhou
- In office April 2004 – April 2007
- Preceded by: Mao Linsheng (茅临生)
- Succeeded by: Cai Qi

Personal details
- Born: July 1948 (age 78) Yuyao, Zhejiang, China
- Party: Chinese Communist Party
- Education: Zhejiang University

Sun Zhonghuan (simplified Chinese: 孙忠焕; traditional Chinese: 孫忠煥), is a Chinese politician. He is the former mayor of Hangzhou, Zhejiang. He is the current Chairman of the Hangzhou Political Consultative Conference, a largely ceremonial role.

== Career ==
Sun was born in July 1948 in Yuyao, Ningbo City, Zhejiang Province. Sun studied in Hangzhou University (current Zhejiang University) and the Central Party School of the Chinese Communist Party.

Sun's career includes:

- February 1969 – February 1974, soldier of People's Liberation Army 5170 Branch;
- December 1983 – October 1985, Deputy Secretary and Mayor of Lanxi, Jinhua City, Zhejiang Province;
- November 1989 – March 1993, Secretary of Yongkang, Jinhua City;
- March 1993 – September 1994, Deputy Director of the Zhejiang Provincial Trade and Industry Bureau (浙江省工商局);
- September 1994 – April 1995, Deputy Secretary and Director of the Zhejiang Provincial Trade and Industry Bureau;
- April 1995 – August 1996, General Secretary and Director of the Zhejiang Provincial Trade and Industry Bureau;
- August 1996 – May 2000, Party Secretary of Taizhou City;
- May 2000 – January 2002, Party Secretary of Taizhou City and the Chief Director of the Taizhou NPC;
- January 2002 – February 2003, General Secretary and Chief Director of the Zhejiang Economic and Trade Commission (浙江省經濟貿易委員會/浙江省经济贸易委员)
- April 2004 – January 2005, Deputy Secretary, Vice-mayor and Acting Mayor of Hangzhou;
- February 2005 – April 2007, Deputy Secretary and Mayor of Hangzhou;
- April 2007–present, Chairman of the Hangzhou CPPCC.
