= Hangzhou Xuejun High School =

School in Hangzhou, China

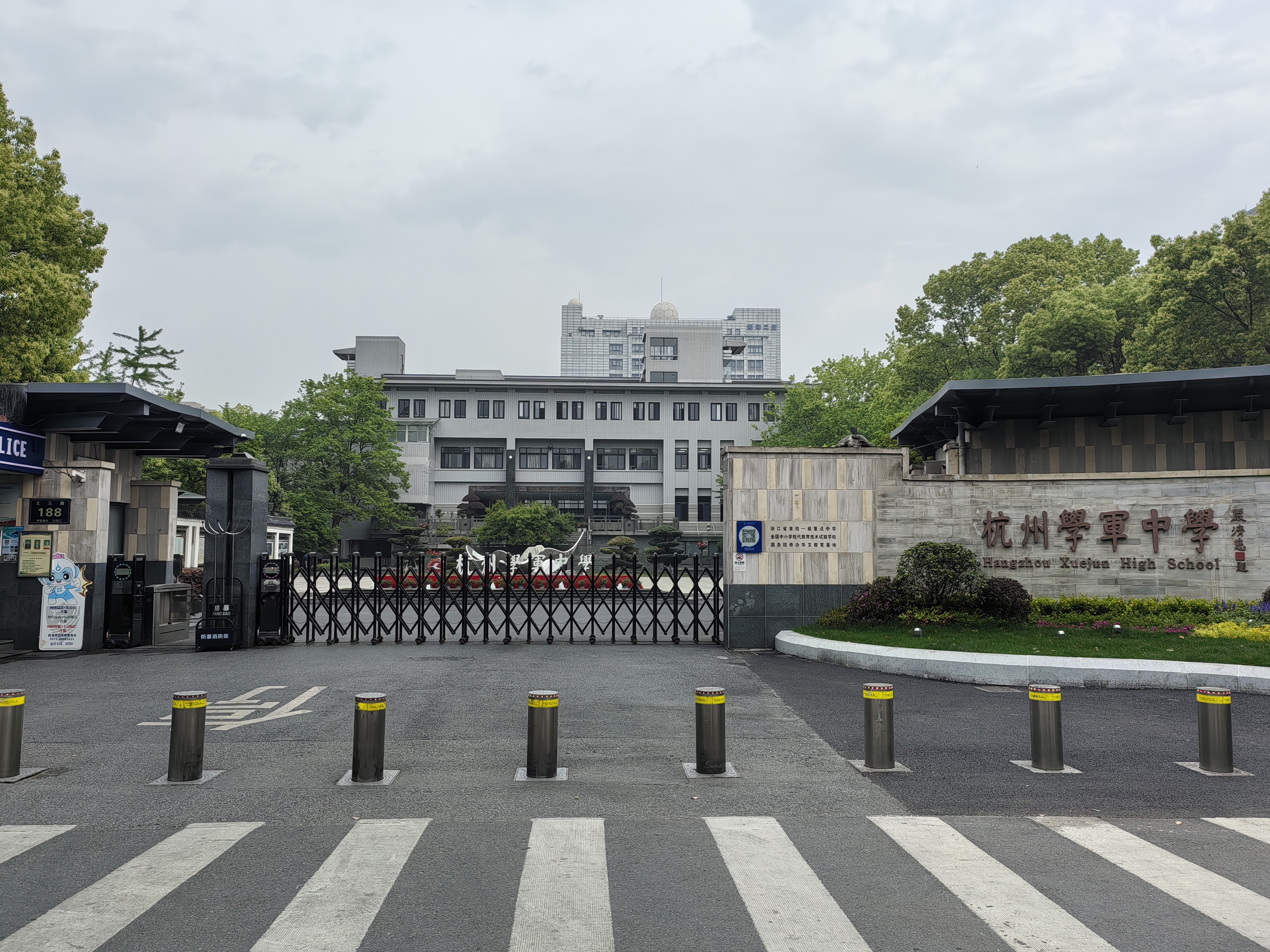
Hangzhou Xuejun High School

Hangzhou Xuejun High School (Chinese: 杭州学军中学) is a high school in Hangzhou, China. The school is often referred to as one of the "three best high schools" in Hangzhou. Hangzhou Wenlan High School is attached to Hangzhou Xuejun High School.

== History ==
Hangzhou Xuejun High School was established in 1956 as a high school affiliated to Hangzhou University. It was approved as a key high school of Zhejiang Province by the provincial government in 1978, and was selected to be a first class key high school of Zhejiang by the provincial education committee in 1995 and was confirmed to be an experimental school with modern education technology by the Ministry of Education in 1997. The school is also a Chinese education base appointed by the Overseas Chinese Affairs Office of the State Department and a Key High School that is open to International Visitors in Hangzhou, Zhejiang. Besides the Xixi campus, the school started operating in the second Zijingang campus in 2016.
