= Insulantarctica =

Insulantarctica is a biogeographic province of the Antarctic Realm according to the classification developed by Miklos Udvardy in 1975. It comprises scattered islands of the Southern Ocean, which show clear affinity to each other. These islands belong to different countries. Some of them constitute UNESCO's protected areas.

- New Zealand Subantarctic Islands protected area (New Zealand):
  - Auckland Islands National Nature Reserve Ia
  - Campbell Islands National Nature Reserve Ia
  - Antipodes Islands National Nature Reserve Ia
  - Snares Islands National Nature Reserve Ia
  - Bounty Islands National Nature Reserve Ia
  - Auckland Islands Marine Mammal Sanctuary - Category unassigned
  - Territorial seas at Campbell, Antipodes, Snares and Bounty Islands - Category unassigned
- Heard Island and McDonald Islands (HIMI) protected area (Australia)
- Macquarie Island (Australia), on World Heritage List since 1997
- Kerguelen Islands protected area (France)
- Tristan da Cunha Islands (United Kingdom), on World Heritage List since 1995
- Prince Edward Islands protected area (South Africa)
- Gough Island Wildlife Reserve (UK)
