= Frontiers of Information Technology & Electronic Engineering =

- Discipline: Electrical and electronic engineering
- Language: English
- Edited by: Pan Yunhe, Xi-cheng Lu

Publication details
- Former name(s): Journal of Zhejiang University Science C (Computer & Electronics)
- History: 2010–present
- Publisher: Zhejiang University Press and Springer Science+Business Media
- Frequency: Monthly
- Impact factor: 2.545 (2021)

Standard abbreviations
- ISO 4: Front. Inf. Technol. Electron. Eng.

Indexing
- ISSN: 2095-9184 (print); 2095-9230 (web)
- OCLC no.: 904575481

Links
- Journal homepage; Journal page at publisher's website

Frontiers of Information Technology & Electronic Engineering is a monthly peer-reviewed scientific journal covering electrical and electronic engineering, including computer and information sciences. It was established in 2010 as Journal of Zhejiang University Science C (Computer & Electronics) and obtained its current title in 2015 when it started to be co-sponsored and administrated by the Chinese Academy of Engineering and Zhejiang University. It is now published by Zhejiang University Press and Springer Science+Business Media.

== Abstracting and indexing ==
The journal is abstracted and indexed in the Science Citation Index Expanded, EI-Compendex, Scopus, and Inspec. According to the Journal Citation Reports, the journal has a 2021 impact factor of 2.545.
