= International Code of Area Nomenclature =

The International Code of Area Nomenclature (ICAN) was proposed by a group of few biogeographers to provide a universal naming system or nomenclature for areas of endemism used in contemporary biogeography. There are other proposals to palaeobiogeographic areas. The ICAN also serves as the international standard rules for proposing and using "area of endemism" names.

The ICAN was ratified by the Systematic and Evolutionary Biogeographical Association (SEBA) in Paris in the only meeting of the group, during July 2007. This community was created and maintained by the same group of biogeographers that proposed the ICAN.

There is little agreement on the use of different methods and systems of nomenclature in Biogeography, and this proposal represents one of the various kinds of study in this science.
