= Organisms Diversity & Evolution =

Peer-reviewed scientific journal

- Discipline: Biology
- Language: English
- Edited by: Andreas Wanninger

Publication details
- History: 2001-present
- Publisher: Springer Science+Business Media on behalf of the Gesellschaft für Biologische Systematik
- Frequency: Quarterly
- Open access: Hybrid
- Impact factor: 2.663 (2021)

Standard abbreviations
- ISO 4: Org. Divers. Evol.

Indexing
- CODEN: ODERAA
- ISSN: 1439-6092 (print); 1618-1077 (web)
- LCCN: 2008233366
- OCLC no.: 47059735

Links
- Journal homepage; Online archive

Organisms Diversity & Evolution is a quarterly peer-reviewed scientific journal covering various aspects of biodiversity and evolution of organisms. It is published by Springer Science+Business Media on behalf of the Gesellschaft für Biologische Systematik and was established in 2001. The editor-in-chief is Andreas Wanninger (University of Vienna).

The journal publishes research articles, reviews, and commentaries related to phylogenetics, taxonomy, comparative morphology, molecular evolution, biogeography, and conservation biology.

== Abstracting and indexing ==
The journal is abstracted and indexed in:

- Aquatic Sciences and Fisheries Abstracts
- Biological Abstracts
- BIOSIS Previews
- CAB Abstracts
- Current Contents/Agriculture, Biology & Environmental Sciences
- EBSCO databases
- ProQuest databases
- Science Citation Index Expanded
- Scopus
- The Zoological Record

According to the Journal Citation Reports, the journal has a 2021 impact factor of 2.663.
