= Journal of Zhejiang University Science A =

- Discipline: Applied physics, engineering
- Language: English
- Edited by: Lin Jianhua Hua-yong Yang

Publication details
- History: 2000–present
- Publisher: Zhejiang University Press and Springer Science+Business Media
- Frequency: Monthly
- Impact factor: 0.941 (2015)

Standard abbreviations
- ISO 4: J. Zhejiang Univ. Sci. A

Indexing
- CODEN: JZUSBN
- ISSN: 1673-565X (print); 1862-1775 (web)
- LCCN: 2007203277
- OCLC no.: 60629915

Links
- Journal homepage; Journal page at publisher's website; Online archive

The Journal of Zhejiang University Science A: Applied Physics & Engineering is a monthly peer-reviewed scientific journal covering applied physics and engineering. It was established in 2000 and is published by Zhejiang University Press and Springer Science+Business Media.

== Abstracting and indexing ==
The journal is abstracted and indexed in the Science Citation Index Expanded, Scopus, and Inspec. According to the Journal Citation Reports, the journal has a 2015 impact factor of 0.941.
