= Effects of hormones on sexual motivation =

Sexual motivation is influenced by hormones such as testosterone, estrogen, progesterone, oxytocin, and vasopressin. In most mammalian species, sex hormones control the ability and motivation to engage in sexual behaviours.

== Measuring sexual motivation ==
Sexual motivation can be measured using a variety of different techniques. Self-report measures, such as the Sexual Desire Inventory, are commonly used to detect levels of sexual motivation in humans. Self-report techniques such as the bogus pipeline can be used to ensure individuals do not falsify their answers to represent socially desirable results. Sexual motivation can also be implicitly examined through frequency of sexual behaviour, including masturbation.

== Hormones ==
=== Testosterone ===
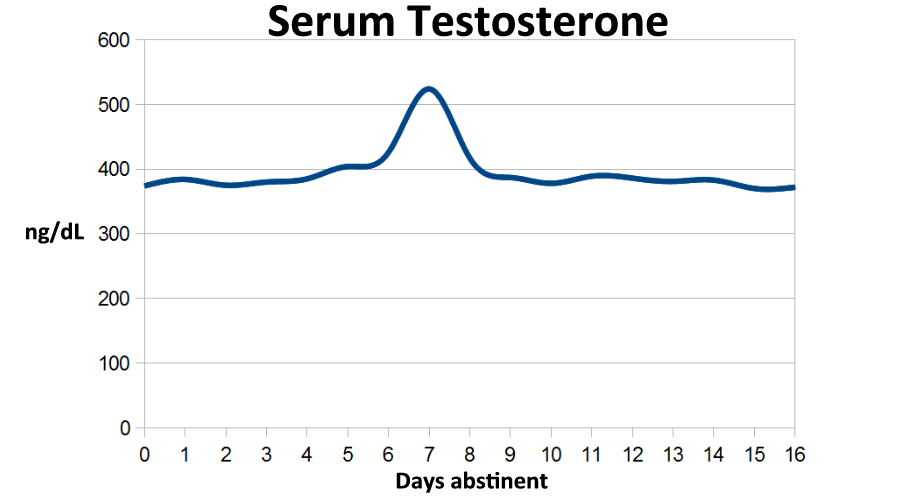
According to data from the Journal of Zhejiang University–Science, male testosterone levels exhibit a rhythm that corresponds to recent sexual activity.

Testosterone appears to be a major contributing factor to sexual motivation in male primates, including humans. The elimination of testosterone in adulthood has been shown to reduce sexual motivation in both male humans and male primates. Male humans who had their testicular function suppressed with a GnRH antagonist displayed decreases in sexual desire and masturbation two weeks following the procedure. Research from male rhesus monkeys suggests testosterone functions to increase sexual motivation, thereby motivating males to compete for access to sexual partners. It is postulated that the motivating effects of testosterone in male rhesus monkeys promotes successful sexual competition and may be particularly important motivating tools for low ranking males. Elimination of testosterone in primates does not reduce the ability to copulate; rather, it reduces the motivation to copulate.

Testosterone levels in males have been shown to vary according to the ovulating state of females. Males who were exposed to scents of ovulating women recorded higher testosterone levels than males who were exposed to scents of nonovulating women. Being exposed to female ovulating cues may increase testosterone, which in turn may increase males' motivation to engage in, and initiate, sexual behaviour. Ultimately, these higher levels of testosterone may increase the reproductive success of males exposed to female ovulation cues.

The relationship between testosterone and female sexual motivation is somewhat ambiguous. Research suggests androgens, such as testosterone, are not sufficient by themselves to prompt sexual motivation in females. In particular, studies with rhesus macaques have observed testosterone was not significantly associated with variations in level of sexual motivation in females. However, some research with nonhuman primates suggests a role for androgens in female sexual behaviour. Adrenalectomized female rhesus monkeys displayed diminished female sexual receptivity. Later studies revealed this diminished sexual receptivity was specific to the elimination of androgens that can be converted to estrogen.

It is also suggested that levels of testosterone are related to the type of relationship in which one is involved. Men involved in polyamorous relationships display higher levels of testosterone than men involved in a single partner relationship or single men. Polyamorous women both have higher levels of testosterone and score higher on measures of sexual desire than women who are single or women who are in single partner relationships.

=== Estrogens and progesterone ===
Estrogens and progesterone typically regulate motivation to engage in sexual behaviour for females in mammalian species, though the relationship between hormones and female sexual motivation is not as well understood. In particular, estrogens have been shown to correlate positively with increases in female sexual motivation, and progesterone has been associated with decreases in female sexual motivation. The periovulatory period of the female menstrual cycle is often associated with increased female receptivity and sexual motivation. During this stage in the cycle, estrogens are elevated in the female and progesterone levels are low. At this time, mating is more likely to result in female pregnancy.

Females at different stages of their menstrual cycle have been shown to display differences in sexual attraction. Heterosexual females not using birth control pills who are ovulating (high levels of estrogens) have a preference for the scent of males with low levels of fluctuating asymmetry. Ovulating heterosexual females also display preferences toward masculine faces and report greater sexual attraction to males other than their current partner. From an evolutionary perspective, increases in estrogens during fertile periods in females may direct sexual motivation toward males with preferential genes (the good genes hypothesis).

Following natural or surgically induced menopause, many women experience declines in sexual motivation. Menopause is associated with a rapid decline of estrogen, as well as a steady rate of decline of androgens. The decline of estrogen and androgen levels is believed to account for the lowered levels of sexual desire and motivation in postmenopausal women, although the direct relationship is not well understood.

=== Oxytocin and vasopressin ===
The hormones oxytocin and vasopressin are implicated in regulating both male and female sexual motivation. Oxytocin is released at orgasm and is associated with both sexual pleasure and the formation of emotional bonds. Based on the pleasure model of sexual motivation, the increased sexual pleasure that occurs following oxytocin release may encourage motivation to engage in future sexual activities. Emotional closeness can be an especially strong predictor of sexual motivation in females and insufficient oxytocin release may subsequently diminish sexual arousal and motivation in females.

High levels of vasopressin can lead to decreases in sexual motivation for females. A link between vasopressin release and aggression has been observed in females, which may impair female sexual arousal and sexual motivation by leading to feelings of neglect and hostility toward a sexual partner. In males, vasopressin is involved in the arousal phase. Vasopressin levels have been shown to increase during erectile response in male sexual arousal, and decrease back to baseline following ejaculation. The increase of vasopressin during erectile response may be directly associated with increased motivation to engage in sexual behaviour.

=== Nonprimate species ===
The hormonal influences of sexual motivation are much more clearly understood for nonprimate females. Suppression of estrogen receptors in the ventromedial nucleus of the hypothalamus in female rats has been observed to reduce female proceptivity and receptivity. Proceptivity and receptivity in the female rat are indicators of sexual motivation, thus indicating a direct relationship between estrogen levels and sexual motivation. In addition, female rats receiving doses of estrogen and progesterone were more likely to exert effort at gaining sexual attention from a male rat. The willingness of the female rats to access males was considered a direct measure of the females' levels of sexual motivation.

An increase in vasopressin has been observed in female rats which have just given birth. Vasopressin is associated with aggressive and hostile behaviours, and is postulated to decrease sexual motivation in females. Vasopressin administered in the female rat brain has been observed to result in an immediate decrease in sexual motivation.

== Sexual orientation ==
Little research has been conducted on the effect of hormones on sexual motivation for same-sex sexual contact. One study observed the relationship between sexual motivation in lesbian and bisexual women and period-related changes in circulating estrogen concentrations. Lesbian women who were at the estrogen peak of their fertile cycle reported increased sexual motivation for sexual contact with women, whereas bisexual women reported only a slight increase in same-sex motivated sexual contact during peak estrogen levels.

Both lesbian and bisexual women showed decreases in sexual motivation for other-sex sexual contact at peak estrogen levels, with greater changes in the bisexual group than the lesbian group.

== Clinical research ==
=== Men ===
- Testosterone is critical for sexual desire, function, and arousal in men. Aromatization of testosterone into the estrogen estradiol appears to be partially responsible for the effects of testosterone on sexual desire and function in men. 5α-Reduction of testosterone into the more potent androgen dihydrotestosterone (DHT) may have a small contribution to the effects of testosterone on sexual desire and function in men. Based on animal research, metabolites of DHT, including the neurosteroids and weak estrogens 3α-androstanediol and 3β-androstanediol, may be involved in sexual function in men.
- Men experience sexual dysfunction at testosterone levels of below 300 ng/dL, with men that have levels of testosterone of approximately 200 ng/dL often experiencing such problems. Complete loss of testicular testosterone production resulting in testosterone levels within the castrate range (95% decrease, to 15 ng/dL on average) with surgical or medical castration causes profound sexual dysfunction in men. Combined marked suppression of testicular testosterone production resulting in testosterone levels of just above the castrate/female range (70 to 80% decrease, to 100 ng/dL on average) and marked androgen receptor antagonism with high-dosage cyproterone acetate monotherapy causes profound sexual dysfunction in men. Treatment of men with medical castration and add-back of multiple dosages of testosterone to restore testosterone levels (to a range of about 200 to 900 ng/dL) showed that testosterone dose-dependently restored sexual desire and erectile function in men. High-dosage monotherapy with an androgen receptor antagonist such as bicalutamide or enzalutamide, which preserves testosterone and estradiol levels, has a minimal to moderate negative effect on sexual desire and erectile function in men in spite of strong blockade of the androgen receptor.
- Estradiol supplementation maintains greater sexual desire in men with surgical or medical castration. High-dose estrogen therapy, which results in marked or complete suppression of testicular testosterone production such that testosterone levels are within the castrate range (95% decrease, to less than 50 ng/dL), causes decreased sexual desire and function. It has also been used to suppress sex drive in men with paraphilias and sex offenders. However, sexual function and activity appear to be significantly better with high-dose estrogen therapy than with surgical castration. Treatment of men with medical castration and add-back testosterone to restore testosterone levels, with or without the aromatase inhibitor anastrozole, showed that prevention of the conversion of testosterone into estradiol partially prevented restoration of sexual desire and erectile dysfunction by testosterone in men. However, this was not the case in another study with a similar design that used the aromatase inhibitor testolactone. Men with aromatase deficiency and estrogen insensitivity syndrome, and hence estrogen deficiency, appear to have normal sexual desire, function, and activity. However, estradiol supplementation in some men with aromatase deficiency increased sexual desire and activity but not in other men with aromatase deficiency. Treatment with the antiestrogenic selective estrogen receptor modulator (SERM) tamoxifen has been found to decrease sexual desire in men treated with it for male breast cancer. However, other studies have not found or reported decreased sexual function in men treated with SERMs including tamoxifen, clomifene, raloxifene, and toremifene.
- 5α-Reductase inhibitors, which block the conversion of testosterone into DHT, result in a slightly increased risk of sexual dysfunction with an incidence of decreased libido and erectile dysfunction of about 3 to 16%. Treatment of healthy men with multiple dosages of testosterone enanthate, with or without the 5α-reductase inhibitor dutasteride, showed that dutasteride did not significantly influence changes in sexual desire and function. Treatment of men with high-dosage bicalutamide therapy, with or without the 5α-reductase inhibitor dutasteride, showed that dutasteride did not significantly influence sexual function. Combined high-dosage bicalutamide therapy plus dutasteride showed less sexual dysfunction than medical castration similarly to high-dosage bicalutamide monotherapy.
- Treatment of men with very high-dosage DHT (a non-aromatizable androgen), which resulted in an increase in DHT levels by approximately 10-fold and complete suppression of testosterone and estradiol levels, showed that none of the measures of sexual function were significantly changed with the exception of a mild but significant decrease in sexual desire. Treatment of hypogonadal men with the aromatizable testosterone undecanoate and the non-aromatizable mesterolone showed that testosterone undecanoate produced better improvements in mood, libido, erection, and ejaculation than did mesterolone. However, the dosage of mesterolone could have been suboptimal.

=== Women ===
- Estradiol seems to be the most important hormone for sexual desire in women. Periovulatory levels of estradiol increase sexual desire in postmenopausal women. Based on animal research, progesterone may also be involved in sexual function in women. Very limited clinical research suggests that progesterone does not increase sexual desire and may decrease it.
- There is little support for the notion that physiological levels of testosterone are important for sexual desire in women, although supraphysiological levels of testosterone can increase sexual desire in women similarly to the high levels in men. There is little to no correlation between total testosterone levels within the normal physiological range and sexual desire in premenopausal women.
- Sexual desire is not increased in women with polyendocrine metabolic ovarian syndrome (PMOS) in spite of high testosterone levels. Women with PMOS actually experience increased sexual desire following treatment of their condition, likely due improved psychological functioning (e.g., body image). Sexual desire is not decreased in women with complete androgen insensitivity syndrome (CAIS) relative to unaffected women in spite of a completely non-functional androgen receptor.
- Systematic reviews and meta-analyses of research on variation during the menstrual cycle of women's sexual activity with partners and the effects of the use of the combined oral contraceptive pill (COCP) by women on their sexual desire show that sexual desire is self-reported to be unchanged in most women taking COCPs, but also conclude that the effects of COCPs on women's sexual desire is not well-studied and that women experience increased sexual activity with partners in the last third of the follicular phase of the menstrual cycle and at ovulation (when levels of endogenous estradiol and luteinizing hormones are heightened) as compared with the luteal phase and during menstruation. Almost all combined birth control pills contain the potently liver-active estrogen ethinylestradiol, and the typical doses of ethinylestradiol present in combined birth control pills increase sex hormone-binding globulin (SHBG) levels by 2- to 4-fold and consequently decrease free testosterone levels by 40 to 80%. Cross-sectional research has shown that SHBG is inversely correlated with sexual desire in premenopausal women.
- There are conflicting reports on the effects of combined birth control pills on sexual function in women. Progestogen-only birth control, such as with depot medroxyprogesterone acetate or the etonogestrel birth control implant, has shown mixed effects on sexual desire and function. Androgen receptor antagonists such as flutamide and bicalutamide cause little to no decrease in sexual desire in women.
- Low dosages of testosterone that result in physiological levels of testosterone (< 50 ng/dL) do not increase sexual desire in women. High dosages of testosterone that result in supraphysiological levels of testosterone (> 50 ng/dL) significantly increase sexual desire in women, with levels of testosterone of 80 to 150 ng/dL "slightly" increasing sexual desire. Further higher dosages of testosterone may result in greater effects on sexual desire in women. High dosages of testosterone (with levels of > 50 ng/dL) have a risk of masculinization (e.g., acne, hair growth, voice changes) with long-term therapy in women. High dosages of testosterone but not low dosages of testosterone enhance the effects of low dosages of estrogens on sexual desire. Tibolone, a combined estrogen, progestin, and androgen, may increase sex drive to a greater extent than standard estrogen–progestogen therapy in postmenopausal women.

=== Transgender individuals ===
- Testosterone therapy increases sexual desire and arousal in transgender men. Estradiol and antiandrogen therapy increase sexual desire and arousal in transgender women after a temporary decrease.

== See also ==
- Body odour and sexual attraction
- Hypoactive sexual desire disorder
- Menopause
- Menstrual cycle
- Pheromone
- Sexual desire and intimate relationships
