= Journal of Zhejiang University Science B =

- Discipline: Biomedicine, biotechnology
- Language: English
- Edited by: Shu-min Duan and De-nian Ba

Publication details
- History: 2000–present
- Publisher: Zhejiang University Press and Springer Science+Business Media
- Frequency: Monthly
- Impact factor: 1.676 (2016)

Standard abbreviations
- ISO 4: J. Zhejiang Univ. Sci. B

Indexing
- CODEN: JZUSAM
- ISSN: 1673-1581 (print); 1862-1783 (web)
- LCCN: 2005243231
- OCLC no.: 804673527

Links
- Journal homepage; Journal page at Springer website; Online access

The Journal of Zhejiang University Science B: Biomedicine & Biotechnology is a monthly peer-reviewed scientific journal covering biomedicine, biochemistry, and biotechnology. It was established in 2000 and is published by Zhejiang University Press in collaboration with Springer Science+Business Media. The editors-in-chief are Shu-min Duan and De-nian Ba, both of Zhejiang University.

== Abstracting and indexing ==
The journal is abstracted and indexed in the Science Citation Index Expanded, The Zoological Record, BIOSIS Previews, Index Medicus/MEDLINE/PubMed, and Scopus. According to Journal Citation Reports, the journal has a 2016 impact factor of 1.676.
