= Cladistics (journal) =

Peer-reviewed scientific journal

- Discipline: Cladistics
- Language: English
- Edited by: Rudolf Meier

Publication details
- History: 1985–present
- Publisher: Wiley-Blackwell
- Frequency: Bimonthly
- Impact factor: 3.9 (2023)

Standard abbreviations
- ISO 4: Cladistics

Indexing
- ISSN: 0748-3007 (print); 1096-0031 (web)

Links
- Journal homepage; Online access; Online archive

Cladistics is a bimonthly peer-reviewed scientific journal which has published research in cladistics since 1985. It is published by Wiley-Blackwell on behalf of the Willi Hennig Society. Cladistics publishes papers relevant to evolution, systematics, and integrative biology. Papers of both a conceptual or philosophical nature, discussions of methodology, empirical studies on taxonomic groups from animals to bacteria, and applications of systematics in disciplines such as genomics, paleontology and biomedical epidemiology are accepted. Five types of paper appear in the journal: reviews, regular papers, forum papers, letters to the editor, and book reviews. Its editor-in-chief is Rudolf Meier, who replaced Dennis Stevenson in 2019. According to the Journal Citation Reports, the journal has a 2023 impact factor of 3.9, ranking it 10th out of 50 journals in the category "Evolutionary Biology".
