= Systematic Biology =

- Discipline: Systematics
- Language: English
- Edited by: Robert C. Thomson

Publication details
- Former name: Systematic Zoology
- History: 1952-present
- Publisher: Oxford University Press on behalf of the Society of Systematic Biologists (United States)
- Frequency: Bimonthly
- Open access: After 1 year
- Impact factor: 15.683 (2020)

Standard abbreviations
- ISO 4: Syst. Biol.

Indexing
- ISSN: 1063-5157 (print); 1076-836X (web)
- LCCN: 92641595
- OCLC no.: 34872116

Links
- Journal homepage; Online access

Systematic Biology is a peer-reviewed scientific journal published by Oxford University Press on behalf of the Society of Systematic Biologists. It covers the theory, principles, and methods of systematics as well as phylogeny, evolution, morphology, biogeography, paleontology, genetics, and the classification of all living things.

The journal was established in 1952 as Systematic Zoology and obtained its current title in 1992.
