= Miklos Udvardy =

Hungarian biologist and biogeographer (1919–1998)

Miklos Dezso Ferenc Udvardy
- Born: 23 March 1919; Debrecen, Hungarian Soviet Republic
- Died: 27 January 1998 (aged 78); Sacramento, California, United States
- Scientific career
- Fields: Biology, biogeography, and ornithology

Miklos Dezso Ferenc Udvardy (March 23, 1919 – January 27, 1998) was a Hungarian-born Canadian biologist and professor at the University of British Columbia. He made significant contributions to various fields, including biogeography, evolutionary biology, ornithology, and vegetation classification. Udvardy published 191 papers and books including an influential text on zoogeography.

== Early life and career ==
He began his career as a research biologist at the Tihanyi Biological Station, located on Lake Balaton in western Hungary.

== Selected publications ==
- Udvardy, M. D. F. (1975). A classification of the biogeographical provinces of the world. IUCN Occasional Paper no. 18. Morges, Switzerland: IUCN, .
- Udvardy, Miklos D. F. (1975) "World Biogeographical Provinces" (Map). The CoEvolution Quarterly, Sausalito, California.
