= Systematic and Evolutionary Biogeography Association =

The Systematic and Evolutionary Biogeographical Association (SEBA) promotes an open and diverse international biogeographical community by assisting in sharing biogeographical information. Enhancing communication between biogeographers of all countries, SEBA contributes to the development of the theory and practice of systematic and evolutionary biogeography.

SEBA was established in 2006. It is a non-profit organization and a scientific member of the International Union of Biological Sciences.

SEBA promotes the International Code of Area Nomenclature (ICAN), a standardized system of biogeographical reference.
