= Society of Systematic Biologists =

Organization

- Formation: December 29, 1947
- Website: www.systbio.org

The Society of Systematic Biologists (SSB) started as the Society of Systematic Zoology in 1947. A temporary constitution was adopted at the first meeting on 28 December 1947. The updated "biologists" organization (from "zoology") became incorporated on August 9, 1971.

== Overview ==
The Society of Systematic Biologists is a non-profit organization for the advancement of the science of systematic biology. Members of the organization work on the theory, principles, methodology, and practice of systematics involving living and fossil organisms. The organization is involved in projects aimed at the study and classification of biodiversity, such as the Systematics Agenda 2000. The Systematics Agenda 2000 was initiated in conjunction with the SSB by the American Society of Plant Taxonomists and the Willi Hennig Society. The mission of the Systematics Agenda 2000 involving the SSB continues.

== Publishing ==
The society published the journal titled Systematic Zoology from 1952 to 1991, which was renamed Systematic Biology.

== Ernst Mayr Award ==
The Society's annual Ernst Mayr Award "is given to the presenter of the outstanding student talk in the field of systematics" at its yearly meeting and is described as the "SSB's premier award", which is "judged by the quality and creativity of the research completed over the course of the student's Ph.D. program".

Past winners include Alan J. Cooper (1995) and Hopi Hoekstra (1998).
