= Willi Hennig Society =

Organization

- Formation: October 1980
- Headquarters: New York
- Members: fourteen council members
- President: Stefan Richter
- Website: cladistics.org/

The Willi Hennig Society "was founded in 1980 with the expressed purpose of promoting the field of phylogenetic systematics." The society is represented by phylogenetic systematists managing and publishing in the peer-reviewed journal titled Cladistics. The society is named after Willi Hennig, a German systematic entomologist who developed the modern methods and philosophical approach to systematics in the 1940s and 1950s. The society is also involved in reconstructing the tree of life. The current president is Dr. Diego Pol of the Museo Argentino de Ciencias Naturales, succeeding Prof. Dr. Stefan Richter.

== Founding ==
The Willi Hennig Society was founded on a philosophical division among systematic biologists in the late 1970s. A debate created the rift between pheneticists who advocated for statistical or numerical methods that grouped taxa by overall similarity in taxonomy and systematic biologists who adopted a strict cladistic approach to taxonomy, recognizing groups by shared, derived characters alone. The last public clash occurred at the 13th Annual Numerical Taxonomy Conference at the Museum of Comparative Zoology (MCZ), Harvard University in October 1979. Twelve months later, the Willi Hennig Society was founded through invitation by Professor Edward O. Wiley and founding president James S. Farris. Seventy eight systematists from Great Britain, Sweden, Canada, and the United States gathered at the University of Kansas, to inaugurate the Willi Hennig Society. Membership doubled to over 150 by the second meeting.

== Background ==
The Willi Hennig Society is primarily involved in projects aimed at the study and classification of biodiversity using the methods and philosophy originally outlined by Willi Hennig in his book "Phylogenetic Systematics". In 1994, the society teamed up with the Society of Systematic Biologists and the American Society of Plant Taxonomists to organize the Systematics Agenda 2000. The Systematics Agenda 2000 is ongoing and has set out to deliver on the following mission statements:

1. Mission 1: To discover and document past and present life on earth
2. Mission 2: To analyze and synthesize the information derived from this global discovery effort into a history of life and predictive classification system
3. Mission 3: To understand the evolutionary mechanisms that explain the origin, maintenance, and loss of biodiversity
4. Mission 4: To communicate and apply this knowledge to science and society

== Publishing ==
The Willi Hennig Society publishes the journal Cladistics.
