= Zhejiang University Press =

Chinese academic publisher

Zhejiang University Press (simplified Chinese: 浙江大学出版社; traditional Chinese: 浙江大學出版社) is the official press of Zhejiang University (People's Republic of China).

Established in May 1984, Zhejiang University Press publishes on diverse subjects and covers areas of natural sciences, engineering and technology, the humanities and social sciences, medicine and life sciences. It publishes monographs, textbooks for teachers and students, professional and trade books, and art albums. In recent years, the press has established close partnerships with publishers outside China, such as Springer Science+Business Media, Elsevier, WSPC, Cengage, Oxford University Press, Cambridge University Press, and McGraw-Hill.
