= Sex differences in cognition =

Sex differences in cognition are widely studied in the current scientific literature. Biological and genetic differences in combination with environment and culture have resulted in the cognitive differences among males and females. Among biological factors, hormones such as testosterone and estrogen may play some role mediating these differences. Among differences in diverse cognitive abilities, the most studied are those relating to spatial abilities, emotional perception and verbal abilities.

== Sex differences in memory ==
=== Short term memory ===
Various researchers have conducted studies to determine the differences between males and females and their abilities within their short-term memory. For example, a study conducted by Lowe, Mayfield, and Reynolds (2003) examined sex differences among children and adolescents on various short-term memory measures. This study included 1,279 children and adolescents, 637 males and 642 females, between the ages of 5 and 19. They found that females scored higher on two verbal subtests: Word Selective Reminding and Object Recall, and males scored higher on the Memory for Location and Abstract Visual Memory subtests, the key spatial memory tasks. In two different studies researchers have found that women perform higher on verbal tasks and men perform higher on spatial tasks (Voyer, Voyer, & Saint-Aubin, 2016). These findings are consistent with studies of intelligence with regards to pattern, females performing higher on certain verbal tasks and males performing higher on certain spatial tasks (Voyer, Voyer, & Saint-Aubin, 2016). Same results have been also found cross culturally. Sex differences in verbal short-term memory have been found regardless of age even among adults, for example a review published in the journal Neuropsychologia which evaluated studies from 1990 to 2013 found greater female verbal memory from ages 11–89 years old.

=== Working memory ===
There are usually no sex differences in overall working memory except those involving spatial information such as space and object. A 2004 study published in the journal of Applied Cognitive Psychology found significantly higher male performance on four visuo-spatial working memory. Another 2010 study published in the journal Brain and Cognition found that males performed better in spatial and object working memory on an n-back test, but did not have higher results for verbal working memory. Similarly another study published in the journal Human Brain Mapping found no sex differences in a verbal n-back working memory task among adult subjects. There were also no sex differences in verbal working memory identified among university students in a study published in the Journal of Dental and Medical Sciences. However, researchers found greater male spatial working memory in studies published in the journals Brain Cognition and Intelligence. Although they found no sex differences in verbal working memory, one group of researchers found lower brain activity or hemodynamics in the prefrontal cortex of females which suggested greater neural efficiency and less effort for the same performance. Researchers have also indicated females might have greater working memory on tasks that only rely on the prefrontal cortex. However, in another study, males outperformed females under high loads of working memory. The authors of the study state: "Results indicated sex effects at high loads across tasks and within each task, such that males had higher accuracy, even among groups that were matched for performance at lower loads". A 2006 review and study on working memory published in the journal European Journal of Cognitive Psychology also found no sex differences in working memory processes except in a double-span task where females outperformed males. There have also been no sex differences found in a popular working memory task known as n-back among a large number of studies.

=== Long term memory ===
Studies have found a greater female ability in episodic memory involving verbal or both verbal and visual-spatial stimuli while a higher male ability in episodic memory only when involving complex visual-spatial stimulus. As for semantic memory related to general knowledge and knowledge of facts from the world. That is, in most areas of cognition, men show higher results on semantic memory as well as in related crystallized intelligence factors.

For example, a study published in the journal Neuropsychology found that women perform at a higher level on most verbal episodic tasks and tasks involving some or little visual-spatial episodic memory. Another study published the following year found that women perform at a higher level in verbal and non-verbal (non-spatial visual) episodic memory but men performed at a higher level in complex visual-spatial episodic memory. A review published in the journal Current Directions in Psychological Science by researcher Agneta Herlitz also conclude that higher ability in women on episodic-memory tasks requiring both verbal and visuospatial episodic memory and on face-recognition tasks, while men have higher abilities for episodic memory, where visual-spatial skills of high complexity are required.

Sex differences in semantic memory have also been found with a higher female ability which can be explained by a female advantage in verbal fluency. One other study also found greater female free-recall among the ages 5–17.

In another study, when using multiple tests for episodic memory, there were no differences between men and women. A similar result was also found among children from 3 to 6 years old.

=== Attention ===
A 2002 study published in the Journal of Vision found that males were faster at shifting attention from one object to another as well as shifting attention within objects. 2012–2014 studies published in the Journal of Neuropsychology with a sample size ranging from 3500 to 9138 participants by researcher Ruben C Gur found higher female attention accuracy in a neurocognitive battery assessing individuals from ages 8–21. A 2013 study published in the Chinese Medical Journal found no sex differences in executive and alerting of attention networks but faster orientation of attention among females. A 2010 study published in Neuropsychologia also found greater female responsiveness in attention to processing overall sensory stimulation.

== Sex differences in processing speed ==
Sex differences in processing speed has been largely noted in literature. Studies published in the journal Intelligence have found faster processing speed in women. For example, a 2006 study published in Intelligence by researcher Stephen Camarata and Richard Woodcock found faster processing speed in females across all age groups in a sample of 4,213 participants. This was followed by another study published in 2008 by researchers Timothy Z Keith and Matthew R. Reynolds who found faster processing speed in females from ages 6 to 89 years old. The sample also had a number of 8,818 participants. Other studies by Keith have also found faster processing speed in females from ages 5 to 17. In one recent study, groups of men and women were tested using the WAIS-IV and WAIS-R tests. According to the research results, there were no differences in processing speed between men and women.

== Sex differences in semantic perception ==
Studies of sex differences in semantic perception (attribution of meaning) of words reported that males conceptualize items in terms of physical or observable attributes whereas females use more evaluative concepts. Another study of young adults in three cultures showed significant sex differences in semantic perception (attribution of meaning) of most common and abstract words. Contrary to common beliefs, women gave more negative scores to the concepts describing sensational objects, social and physical attractors but more positive estimations to work- and reality-related words, in comparison to men This suggests that men favour concepts related to extreme experience and women favour concepts related to predictable and controllable routines. In a light of the higher rates of sensation seeking and deviancy in males, in comparison to females, these sex differences in meaning attribution were interpreted as support for the evolutionary theory of sex.

== Sex differences in spatial abilities ==
Rubik's cube puzzle involving mental rotation

Sex differences in spatial abilities are widely established in literature. Males have higher level of performance in three major spatial tasks which include spatial visualization, spatial perception and mental rotation. Spatial visualization elicits the smallest difference with a deviation of 0.13, perception a deviation of 0.44 and mental rotation the largest with a deviation of 0.73. Another 2013 meta-analysis published in the journal Educational Review found greater male mental rotation in a deviation of 0.57 which only grew larger as time limits were added. These male advantages manifests themselves in math and mechanical tasks for example significantly higher male performance on tests of geometry, measurement, probability, statistics and especially mechanical reasoning. It also manifests and largely mediates higher male performance in arithmetic and computational fluency All of these math and technical fields involve spatial abilities such as rotation and manipulation of imagined space, symbols and objects. Mental rotation has also been linked to higher success in fields of engineering, physics and chemistry regardless of gender. Spatial visualization on the other hand also correlate with higher math achievement in a range of 0.30 to 0.60. Furthermore, male advantage in spatial abilities can be accounted for by their greater ability in spatial working memory. Sex differences in mental rotation also reaches almost a single deviation (1.0) when the tasks require navigation, as found in one study with participants who used Oculus Rift in a virtual environment. A 2009 study using data from the BBC of over 200,000 people in 53 nations showed that in all nations examined, men outperformed women in both mental rotation and in angle judgment, and that these differences increased with measures of gender equality. A 2019 meta-analysis of the literature from 1988 to 2018 likewise found the same results at both the behavioral and neural levels, though the effect sizes were larger for large-scale spatial ability than small-scale spatial ability.

Even though most spatial abilities are higher in men, object location memory or the ability to memorize spatial cues involving categorical relations are higher in women. But it depends on the type of stimulus (object) and the task. In some conditions, men's productivity is higher (for example, when "male" objects are used), in other conditions, women's productivity may be higher or there are no differences between the sexes. Higher female ability in visual recognition of objects and shapes have also been found.

== Sex differences in verbal ==
A recent meta-analysis of 168 studies, 496 effect sizes, and 355,173 trials found a small female advantage in verbal fluency and verbal episodic memory, but that was partly attributed to publication bias favoring studies showing a female advantage.

Like spatial ability, sex differences in verbal abilities have been widely established in literature. There is a higher female performance on a number of verbal tasks prominently a higher level of performance in speech production and also a higher performance in writing. Studies have also found greater female performance in phonological processing, identifying alphabetical sequences, and word fluency tasks. Studies have also found that females outperform males in verbal learning especially on tests such as Rey Auditory Verbal Learning Test and Verbal Paired Associates. It has also been found that the hormone estrogen increases ability of speech production and phonological processing in women, which could be tied to their advantages in these areas. Overall better female performance have also been found in verbal fluency which include a trivial advantage in reading comprehension while a significantly higher performance in speech production and essay writing. This manifests in higher female international PISA scores in reading and higher female Grade 12 scores in national reading, writing and study skills. Researchers Joseph M. Andreano and Larry Cahill have also found that the female verbal advantage extends into numerous tasks, including tests of spatial and autobiographical abilities.

In a fairly large meta-analysis that analyzed 165 different studies, a very small difference of 0.11 standard deviations was found. The authors of this study postulate: "The difference is so small that we argue that gender differences in verbal ability no longer exist."

== Sex differences in emotional cognition ==
Current literature suggests women have higher level of emotional cognition, specially the hability to interprete emotional signals of other people. A 2012 review published in the journal Neuropsychologia found that women are better at recognizing facial effects, expression processing and emotions in general. Men were only better at recognizing specific behaviour which includes anger, aggression and threatening cues. A 2012 study published in the journal Neuropsychology with a sample of 3,500 individuals from ages 8–21, found that females outperformed males on face memory and all social cognition tests. In 2014, another study published in the journal Cerebral Cortex found that females had larger activity in the right temporal cortex, an essential core of the social brain connected to perception and understanding the social behaviour of others such as intentions, emotions, and expectations. In 2014, a meta-analysis of 215 study sample by researcher A.E. Johnson and D Voyeur in the journal Cognition and Emotion found overall female advantage in emotional recognition. Other studies have also indicated greater female superiority to discriminate vocal and facial expression regardless of valence, and also being able to accurately process emotional speech. Studies have also found males to be slower in making social judgments than females. Structural studies with MRI neuroimaging has also shown that women have bigger regional grey matter volumes in a number of regions related to social information processing including the Inferior frontal cortex and bigger cortical folding in the Inferior frontal cortex and parietal cortex Researchers suppose that these sex differences in social cognition predisposes males to high rates of autism spectrum disorders which is characterized by lower social cognition.

A recent study that aimed to identify gender differences in social cognition did not show significant differences, with few exceptions. The study authors state: "The presence of sex differences in social cognition is controversial". Results showed no significant sex differences in affective and cognitive ToM, in the recognition of emotional facial expressions, or in the ability to identify and regulate one's own emotions.

=== Empathy ===
Empathy is a large part of social cognition and facilitates its cognitive components known as theory of mind. Current literature suggests a higher level of empathy in women compared to men.

A 2014 analysis from the journal of Neuroscience & Biobehavioral Reviews reported that there is evidence that "sex differences in empathy have phylogenetic and ontogenetic roots in biology and are not merely cultural byproducts driven by socialization." Other research has found no differences in empathy between women and men, and suggest that perceived gender differences are the result of motivational differences.

== See also ==
- Sex differences in humans
- Sex differences in psychology
- Sex differences in intelligence
- Sex differences in emotional intelligence
- Sexual dimorphism in human bonding
- Variability hypothesis
- Emotional intelligence
- Empathy
- Spatial ability
- Mechanical aptitude
