= RBA =

RBA are initials that may refer to:

== People ==
- Rod Brind'Amour, Canadian professional ice hockey player and coach
- Roberto Bautista Agut, Spanish tennis player

== Organizations ==
- Reserve Bank of Australia
- Ritchie Bros. Auctioneers, Canada, stock exchange symbol
- Roads Beautifying Association, a British charity
- Royal Bhutan Army
- Royal Brunei Airlines. ICAO code
- Royal Society of British Artists
- RBA TV, a television station in Belém, Pará, Brazil
- RBA bank, former Serbian bank

== Transportation ==
- Sale Airport in Rabat, Morocco, IATA code

== Math and science ==
- Relative byte address in an Entry Sequenced Data Set
- Runbook automation, in a computer system or network

== Other ==
- Ranger Body Armor, US Army ballistic vest
- Regents Bachelor of Arts, a degree program offered by the University System of West Virginia
- Role-based assessment, in psychology
- Rudy Bruner Award for Urban Excellence, American award in architecture
