= Guy Montrose Whipple =

American psychologist (1876–1941)

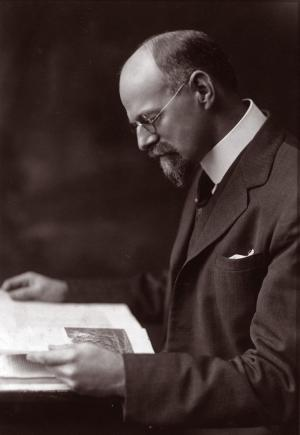
- Born: June 12, 1876; Danvers, Massachusetts
- Died: August 1, 1941 (aged 65); Clifton, Massachusetts
- Citizenship: American
- Education: Brown University (A.B., 1897); Cornell University (Ph.D., 1900)
- Known for: Psychological testing
- Spouse: Clarice Johnson Rogers (m. 1901–1941)
- Children: 3
- Scientific career
- Fields: Educational psychology
- Institutions: Cornell University; Carnegie Institute of Technology; University of Illinois
- Doctoral advisor: Edward B. Titchener

Guy Montrose Whipple (June 12, 1876 – August 1, 1941) was an American educational psychologist known for developing psychological tests of human intelligence and personality. His other research interests included gifted education, literacy, vocational education, and the psychology of eyewitness testimony. A 1997 article about giftedness described Whipple as "an all-but-forgotten pioneer in this field".

Whipple was born on June 12, 1876, in Danvers, Massachusetts, to John Francis Whipple and Cornelia Eliza Whipple (née Hood). He received his A.B. degree from Brown University in 1897. He then worked at Clark University for a year before joining Cornell University in 1898, where he worked as an assistant in psychology until 1902. He received his Ph.D. from Cornell in 1900 under the supervision of Edward B. Titchener, who gained a negative impression of Whipple's interest in psychology during this time. He went on to join the faculty of the University of Illinois in 1914 before joining the University of Michigan, where he was Professor of Experimental Education from 1919 to 1925.

Whipple was a founding member of the advisory committee for the Division of Applied Psychology at the Carnegie Institute of Technology (now known as Carnegie Mellon University), as well as one of four founding editors of the Journal of Educational Psychology. He also served alongside Lewis Terman as a member of the American Psychological Association's Committee on the Psychological Examination of Recruits, which helped to develop the Army Alpha and Beta tests used on American soldiers during World War I. He was the editor of elementary school textbooks for D. C. Heath and Company from 1928 to 1937. He died in Clifton, Massachusetts on August 1, 1941, after a brief illness.
