= Military psychology =

Specialized field in psychological science

Military psychology is a specialization within psychology that applies psychological science to promote the readiness of military members, organizations, and operations. Military psychologists provide support to the military in many ways, including through direct clinical care, consultation to military commanders, teaching others and supporting military training; and through research relevant to military operations and personnel.

Military psychology as a field has been growing since the early 20th century, evidence that the demands and needs for psychological clinical and operational application is continuing to grow steadily. There are many stressors associated with military service, including exposure to high-risk training and combat. As such, psychologists are critical support components that assist military leaders in designing appropriate training programs, providing oversight to those programs, and assisting military members as they navigate the challenges of military training and their new lifestyle.

Military psychology covers a wide range of fields throughout the military including operational, tactical, and occupational psychology. Gender differences between military-trained personnel who seek mental health assistance have been extensively studied. Specific examples include post traumatic stress disorder (PTSD) associated with combat, or guilt and family/partner difficulties accompanying extended or frequent deployments due to separation. Clinical providers in military psychology are often focused on the treatment of stress, fatigue, and other personal readiness issues.

Previous wars such as the Korean War, Vietnam War, and World War II provide great insight to the workings and practices of military psychology and how the practices have changed and assisted the military over the years.

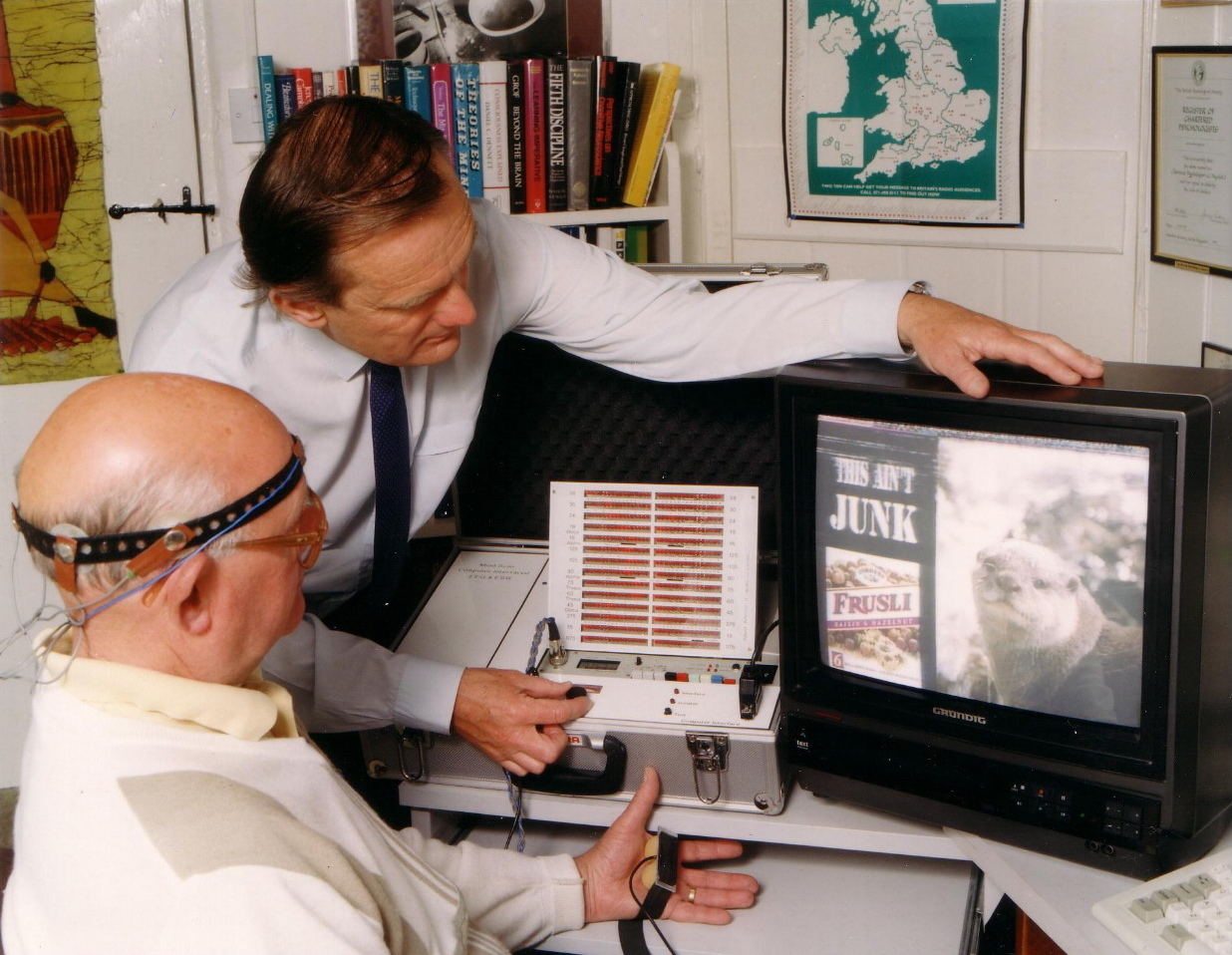
Psychologist Performing a Test

== Role ==
The military is a group of individuals who are trained and equipped to perform national security tasks in unique and often chaotic and trauma-filled situations. These situations can include the front-lines of battle, national emergencies, counter-terrorism support, allied assistance, or the disaster response scenarios where they are providing relief-aid for the host populations of both friendly and enemy states. Though many psychologists may have a general understanding with regards to a humans response to traumatic situations, military psychologists are uniquely trained and experienced specialists in applied science and practice among this special population. While the service members may be providing direct aid to the victims of events, military psychologists are providing specialized aid to both members, their families, and the victims of military operations as they cope with the often "normal" response or reaction to uncommon and abnormal circumstances. Military psychologists can assess, diagnose, treat and recommend the duty status most suitable for the optimal well-being of the individual, group, and organization. Through the use of group therapy, individual therapy, and behavior modification, these psychologists actively treat psychological disorders, most commonly emotional trauma. When counseling members of a military personnel's family, they are most often tasked with providing grief counseling after the loss of a loved one in the line of duty. Events that affect the mental state, resilience or psychological assets and vulnerabilities of the warrior and the command are where military psychologists are most equipped to meet the unique challenges and provide expert care and consultation to preserve the behavioral health of the fighting force.

In addition to the specialized roles previously mentioned, military psychologists often provide support to many non-healthcare-related activities. For example, military psychologists may provide their expertise and training in the consultation to hostage negotiations. Military psychologists are not hostage negotiators; however, they often consult [ation] with those directly communicating with hostage-takers in a manner that seeks the safety and protections of all involved. Military psychologists may also apply their science to aviation selection and training, to the study and application of survival training, and the selection of personnel for special military duties.

Another common practice domain for military psychologists is in performing fitness for duty evaluations, especially in high risk and high reliability occupations. The types of fitness evaluations include both basic entry examinations and career progression examinations such as those conducted when individuals are seeking promotion, higher-classification clearance status, and specialized, hazardous, and mission critical working conditions. When operational commanders become concerned about the impact of continuous, critical, and traumatic operations on those in their command, they often consult with a military psychologist.

The fitness evaluations might lead to command-directed administrative actions or provide the information necessary to make decisions by a medical board or other tribunal and be conducted by non-biased individuals with the experience and training to render a professional opinion. Military psychologists are required to be specialized applied practice professionals.

Another infrequent use of military psychology is in the interview of subjects, the interrogation of prisoners, and the vetting of those who may provide information of operational or intelligence value that could reduce friendly and enemy casualties. Psychology's scientific principles applied here allow the interviewer, agent, or interrogator to extract information through non-invasive means without the need to resort to active measures or risk violating the rules of engagement, host-nation agreements, international and military law or crossing the threshold of the Geneva Conventions' guidelines to which the United States and its allies subscribe.

== Area of study ==
The goals and missions of current military psychologists have been retained over the years, varying with the focus and strength of intensity of research put forth into each sector. Working in research as a military psychologist entails performing personnel research, such as determining what traits are best utilized in which positions, the training procedures, and analyzing what variables impact the health and performance of military personnel. The need for mental health care is now an expected part of high-stress military environments. The importance and severity of post traumatic stress disorder (PTSD) has gained more credibility than those suffering from it received in the past, and is being highlighted in treatment programs. More extensive post-deployment screenings take place now to home in on problematic recoveries that used to be passed unnoticed and untreated.

=== Terrorism ===
Terrorism and counterterrorism, information management, and psychological warfare are value-added roles for the applied aspects of military psychology that are developing. For instance, contrary to the common myths and stereotypes about modern terrorists, that tend portray them as mentally disturbed individuals; most terrorists are far from that typology according to studies conducted by behavioral and social scientists who have either directly interviewed and observed terrorists or conducted meta-analytic studies of terrorism and terrorists.

It is important to understand when and how the label of terrorism is applied because of its psychological impact as suggested above. The causes, goals, methodology, and strategy of the terrorist mindset is well suited for psychological inquiry and the development of the strategy and tactics used to confront it. Terrorism is an ideology that uses behavioral, emotional, and group dynamics, along with social and psychological principles to influence populations for political purposes. It is a form of psychological warfare. The terrorists are experts in the use of fear, violence, threats of violence and trauma in order to advance the political agenda. Terrorists seek psychological control and use violent behavior to cause the population to behave in ways that disrupt and destroy the existing political processes and symbols of political power. They control people by using deep primal emotions to elicit a reaction and shape behavior.

The goal of a terrorist is to use violence or cause terror to create the fear of death and use it to change or shape political behavior, control thought and modify speech. Military and operational psychologists are trained and experienced for terroristic situations. They are experts equipped with the specialized knowledge, skills, and abilities in the art and science of the military and psychology professions that give them potential in this unique operational environment.

=== Operational psychology ===
Operational psychology is a specialty within the field of psychology that applies behavioral science principles through the use of consultation to enable key decision makers to more effectively understand, develop, target, and influence an individual, group or organization to accomplish tactical, operational, or strategic objectives within the domain of national security or national defense. This is a relatively new sub-discipline that has been employed largely by psychologists and behavioral scientists in military, intelligence, and law enforcement arenas (although other areas of public safety employ psychologists in this capacity as well). Operational psychology is not a health care function, but rather, it focuses on organizational effectiveness in support to the operations associated with national security, national defense, and public safety.

While psychology has been utilized in non-health related fields for many decades, recent years have seen an increased focus on its national security applications. Examples of such applications include the development of counterinsurgency strategy through human profiling, interrogation and detention support, information-psychological operations, and the selection of personnel for specialized military or other public safety activities.

Recently, operational psychology has been under increased scrutiny due to allegations of unethical conduct by some practitioners supporting military and law enforcement interrogations. As a result, a small group of psychologists have raised concerns about the ethics of such practice. Supporters of operational psychology have responded by providing an ethical defense of such activity. They argue that the American Psychological Association's ethical code is sufficient to support operational psychologists in a number of activities (to include legal interrogation by the military and other law enforcement agencies).

In response to this controversy, the American Psychological Association (APA) assembled a cross-divisional task force to draft professional practice guidelines built around the APA ethics code and related policies. These guidelines were adopted by the APA's Council of Representatives in August 2023 at their annual convention. An executive summary of the Professional Practice Guidelines for Operational Psychology were later published in the flagship journal of the APA, the American Psychologist.

=== Tactical psychology ===
Tactical psychology is "a sharp focus on what soldiers do once they are in contact with the enemy...on what a front-line soldier can do to win a battle". It combines psychology and historical analysis (the application of statistics to military historical data) to find out how tactics make the enemy freeze, flee or fuss, instead of fight. Tactical psychology examines how techniques like suppressive fire, combined arms or flanking reduce the enemy's will to fight.

Research by the Australian behavioural scientist Jemma King with the Australian Defence Force has found that pre-deployment psychological interventions can reduce stress hormone responses before, during, and after simulated combat scenarios.

=== Health, organizational, and occupational psychology ===
Military psychologists perform work in a variety of areas, including operating mental health and family counseling clinics, performing research to help select recruits for the armed forces, determining which recruits will be best suited for various military occupational specialties, and performing analysis on humanitarian and peacekeeping missions to determine procedures that could save military and civilian lives. Some military psychologists also work to improve the lives of service personnel and their families. Other military psychologists work with large social policy programs within the military that are designed to increase diversity and equal opportunity. More modern programs employ the skills and knowledge of military psychologists to address issues such as integrating diverse ethnic and racial groups into the military and reducing sexual assault and discrimination. Others assist in the employment of women in combat positions and other positions traditionally held by men. Other responsibilities include helping to utilize low-capability recruits and rehabilitate drug-addicted and wounded service members.

Many military psychologists are in charge of drug testing and psychological treatment for mental illnesses, such as alcohol and substance abuse. In terms of the prevalence of psychological issues in the military, active duty members and veterans most commonly struggle with PTSD, anxiety, depression, suicidal ideation, and substance abuse. Worsening psychological symptoms due to potentially traumatic events can cause decision-making impairments. During high-stress situations, decision-making impairments can heavily impact the safety of the individual and their unit. Veteran men who served in the Army and Marine Corps showed poorer mental health than Air Force. These men also showed higher use of alcohol and drugs. Research shows that there are high rates of alcohol use in the military, with a higher prevalence in service men than in service women. In modern times, the advisement of military psychologists is being heard and taken into consideration for national policy more than ever before. There are now more psychologists employed by the U.S. Department of Defense than by any other organization in the world. Since the downsizing of the military in the 1990s, however, there has been a considerable reduction in psychological research and support in the armed forces as well.

Female Soldiers Playing Cards

=== Feminism ===
Women in military roles is an area of study receiving an increasing amount of attention. Currently women make up 10–15% of the armed forces. However, gender integration in the military has been an ongoing process. In 1948, the Women's Armed Services Integration Act was established, allowing women's units to be a part of federal forces. In 1976, women were officially permitted to be integrated into the three main Department of Defense service academies, which only men were originally allowed to attend. While this decision was highly debated, research has shown that gender integration has resulted in men having more positive attitudes towards working in combat positions with women. However, as women tended to move to away from nursing and helping roles, increasing attention is given to how the brutal realities of combat would affect the women psychologically. Research shows that, when affected, women tend to ask for help, more so than men, thus avoiding many of the long-term mental suffering that male soldiers face after their deployment has ended. Some of the mental issues that researchers have been looking into lately is the link between PTSD, sexual harassment, and sexual trauma. Reports indicate that military personnel who report experiencing sexual trauma have a higher likelihood of being diagnosed with a mental health condition during their lifetime (e.g., PTSD) as compared to their civilian counterparts. There are gender differences in regard to sexual assault and/or harassment while on deployment. Women have shown statistically that they receive more sexual assault than men. A large majority of military members turn away from seeking psychological help because they fear differential treatment from leaders.

== History ==
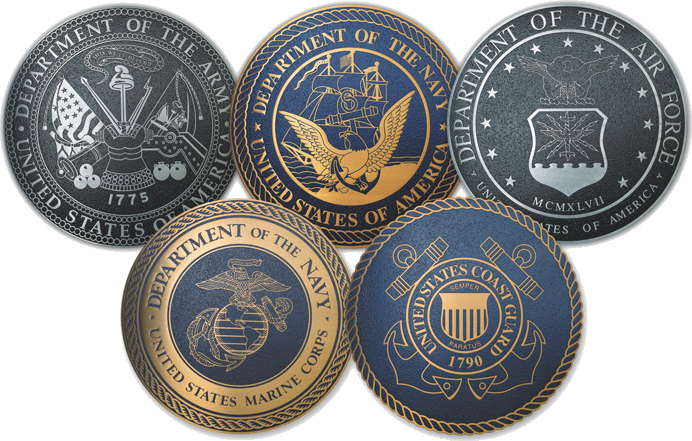
US Armed Forces Seals

Psychological stress and disorders have always been a part of military life, especially during and after wartime, but the mental health section of military psychology has not always experienced the awareness it does now. Even in the present day there is much more research and awareness needed concerning this area.

One of the first institutions created to care for military psychiatric patients was St. Elizabeths Hospital in Washington, D.C. Formerly known as the United States Government Hospital for the Insane, the hospital was founded by the United States Congress in 1855 and is currently in a state of disrepair although operational, with revitalization plans scheduled to begin in 2010.

=== Early work ===
In 1890 James McKeen Cattell coined the term "mental tests". Cattell studied under Wundt at Leipzig in Germany at one point during his life and strongly advocated for psychology to be viewed as a science on par with the physical and life sciences. He promoted the need for standardization of procedures, use of norms, and advocated the use of statistical analysis to study individual differences. He was unwavering in his opposition to America's involvement in World War I.

Lightner Witmer, who also spent some time working under Wundt, changed the scene for psychology forever from his position at the University of Pennsylvania when he coined the term "clinical psychology" and outlined a program of training and study. This model for clinical psychology is still followed in modern times. Eleven years later in 1907 Witmer founded the journal The Psychological Clinic.

Also in 1907, a routine psychological screening plan for hospitalized psychiatric patients was developed by Shepard Ivory Franz, civilian research psychologist at St. Elizabeth's Hospital. Two years later, under the leadership of William Alanson White, St. Elizabeth's Hospital became known for research and training of psychiatrists and military medical officers. In 1911 Hebert Butts, a navy medical officer stationed at St. Elizabeth's, published the first protocol for psychological screening of navy recruits based on Franz's work.

=== Intelligence testing in the U.S. military ===
Lewis M. Terman, a professor at Stanford University, revised the Binet-Simon Scale in 1916, renaming it the Stanford-Binet Revision. This test was the beginning of the "Intelligence Testing Movement" and was administered to over 170,000 soldiers in the United States Army during World War I. Yerkes published the results of these tests in 1921 in a document that became known as the Army Report.

There were two tests that initially made up the intelligence tests for the military: Army Alpha and Army Beta tests. They were developed to evaluate vast numbers of military recruits that were both literate (Army Alpha tests) and illiterate (Army Beta tests). The Army Beta test were designed to "measure native intellectual capacity". The Army Beta test also helped to test non-English speaking service members.

The standardized intelligence and entrance tests that have been used for each military branch in the United States has transformed over the years. Finally, in 1974, "the Department of Defense decided that all Services should use Armed Services Vocational Aptitude Battery (ASVAB) for both screening enlistees and assigning them to military occupations. Combining selection and classification testing made the testing process more efficient. It also enabled the Services to improve the matching of applicants with available job positions and allowed job guarantees for those qualified". This went fully into effect in 1976.

=== Yerkes and war ===
Robert M. Yerkes, while he was president of the American Psychological Association (APA) in 1917, worked with Edward B. Titchener and a group of psychologists that were known as the "Experimentalists". Their work resulted in formulating a plan for APA members to offer their professional services to the World War I effort, even though Yerkes was known for being opposed to America being involved in the war at all. It was decided that psychologists could provide support in developing methods for selection of recruits and treatment of war victims. This was spurred, in part, by America's growing interest in the work of Alfred Binet in France on mental measurement, as well as the scientific management movement to enhance worker productivity.

In 1919, Yerkes was commissioned as a major in the U.S. Army Medical Service Corps. In a plan proposed to the Surgeon General, Yerkes wrote: "The Council of the American Psychological Association is convinced that in the present emergency American psychology can substantially serve the Government, under the medical corps of the Army and Navy, by examining recruits with respect to intellectual deficiency, psychopathic tendencies, nervous instability, and inadequate self-control". Also in 1919, the Army Division of Psychology in the Medical Department was established at the medical training camp at Fort Oglethorpe, Georgia to train personnel to provide mental testing of large groups.

This was also the era when the condition referred to as "shell shock" was first seriously studied by psychologists and standardized screening tests for pilots were administered.

=== World War II ===
World War II ushered in an era of substantial growth for the psychological field, centering around four major areas: testing for individual abilities, applied social psychology, instruction and training, and clinical psychology. During World War II, the Army General Classification Test (AGCT) and the Navy General Classification Test (NGCT) were used in place of the Army Alpha and Army Beta tests for similar purposes.

The United States Army had no unified program for the use of clinical psychologists until 1944, towards the end of World War II. Before this time, no clinical psychologists were serving in Army hospitals under the supervision of psychiatrists. This had to do with psychologists' opposition to this type of service and also to the limited role the Army assigned to psychiatry. At this time, the only psychiatric interview that was being processed on the ever-increasing numbers of military recruits lasted only three minutes and could only manage to weed out the severely disturbed recruits. Under these conditions, it was impossible to determine which seemingly normal recruits would crack under the strain of military duties, and the need for clinical psychologists grew. By 1945 there were over 450 clinical psychologists serving in the U.S. Army.

Military psychology matured well past the areas aforementioned that concerned psychologists up until this time, branching off into sectors that included military leadership, the effects of environmental factors on human performance, military intelligence, psychological operations and warfare (such as Special Forces like PSYOP), selection for special duties, and the influences of personal background, attitudes, and the work group on soldier motivation and morals.

=== Korean War ===
The Korean War was the first war in which clinical psychologists served overseas, positioned in hospitals as well as combat zones. Their particular roles were vague, broad, and fairly undefined, except for the U.S. Air Force, which provided detailed job descriptions. The Air Force also outlined the standardized tests and procedures for evaluating recruits that were to be used.

=== Vietnam War ===
In the Vietnam War, there were significant challenges that obstructed the regular use of psychologists to support combat troops. The mental health teams were very small, usually only consisting of one psychiatrist, one psychologist, and three or four enlisted corpsmen. Quite often, medical officers, including psychologists, were working in severe conditions with little or no field experience. Despite these challenges, military psychiatry had improved compared to previous wars, which focused on maximizing function and minimizing disability by preventive and therapeutic measures.

=== Global War on Terror ===
A 2014 study of soldiers who had mental health problems after Overseas Contingency Operation service found that a majority of them had symptoms before they enlisted.

== See also ==
- Army Alpha
- Army Beta
- Center for Deployment Psychology
- Human subject research
- Military science
- MKULTRA
- Morale
- Perpetrator trauma
- Psychological warfare
- Unit cohesion
