= Paul Marion =

Paul Marion may refer to:

- Paul Marion (politician) (1899–1954), French politician
- Paul Marion (actor) (1915–2011), American actor
- J. Paul Marion (born 1927), politician from Manitoba, Canada
- Paul Marion (university administrator), an American university administrator and academic
