= Clifton Conference =

Religious educational conferences (1901–1908)

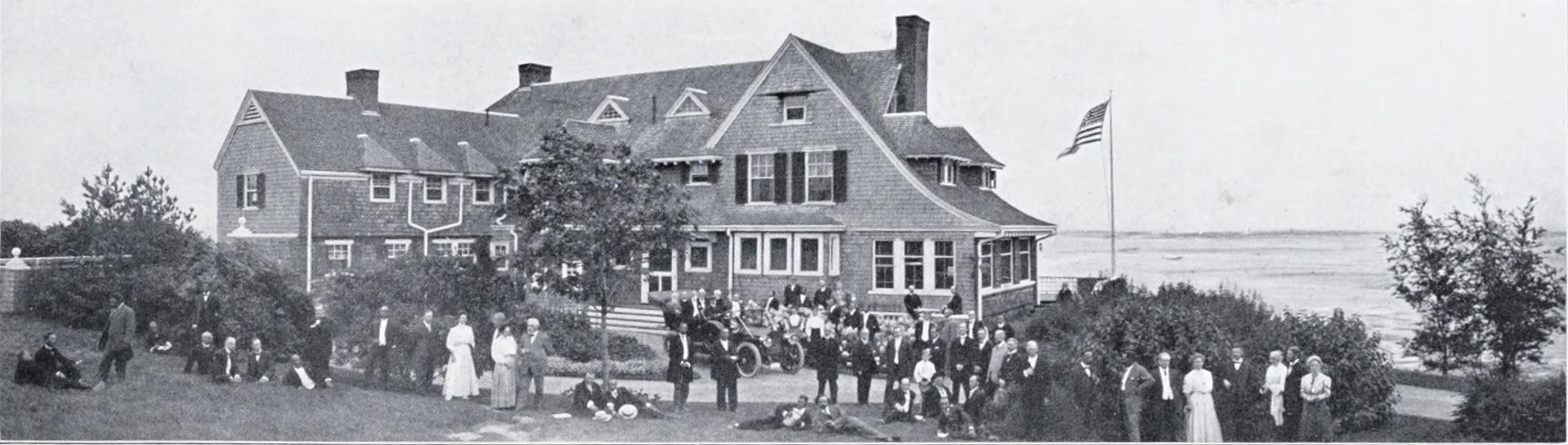
Members of the fifth conference in front of the Dyke Rock Cottage on August 19, 1908

The Clifton Conference was a series of gatherings of religious leaders held by Baptist leader William N. Hartshorn at his summer home in Clifton, Massachusetts. Five conferences are known to have been held, between 1901 and 1908.

The most historically impactful Clifton conference is the fifth one, where religious leaders discussed the educational, religious, and social issues facing African Americans after the end of slavery in the United States. The Conference was organized by the International Sunday-School Association (ISSA), of which Hartshorn was the director.

== List of conferences ==
- June 3, 1901: conference of the Massachusetts Sunday School Association
- June 2, 1902: conference of the Massachusetts Association District Presidents
- June 18, 1903: conference of the International Sunday School Editorial Association
- August 1905: conference of the Central Committee of the International Sunday-School Association
- August 1908: conference on "The Relation of the Sunday-School to the Moral and Religious Education of the Negro"

== First conference (1901) ==
In 1901, William N. Hartshorn, the executive committee chairman of the Massachusetts Sunday School Association, organized a representative conference at his newly-completed home, "Dyke Rock Cottage," in Clifton, Massachusetts. The conference was attended by more than 300 people, including members of the association, various guests, as well as their spouses.

The conference began with devotional services led by Reverend A. C. Dixon and Bishop Willard Francis Mallalieu. This was followed by status reports from members of the Association's executive committee, and discussions on ways to address the needs and difficulties of Sunday school teachers in the districts represented by the participants. The conference closed with prayer.

== Second conference (1902) ==
Hartshorn held the second conference on June 2, 1902. Meetings were conducted by the state secretaries and presidents of the Massachusetts Sunday School Association.

== Third conference (1903) ==
The third Clifton Conference was held on June 18, 1903. At the time, Hartshorn was still serving as the chairman of the Massachusetts Sunday School Association (MSSA), and had also taken on the role of chairman of the International Sunday School Association (ISSA). The Portsmouth Herald reported that by this point, the Clifton Conference had become an eagerly anticipated event for Sunday school workers in Massachusetts.

Hartshorn invited members of the MSSA, ISSA, and around 30 members of the Sunday School Editorial Association, who wrote "lesson helps" and Sunday school periodicals interpreting the international Sunday school lesson. According to the Herald, these periodicals had a collective circulation of 14 million, and the 30 guests included notable representatives of the leading denominations. Nearly 300 workers "from all parts of the commonwealth" attended the conference, representing many denominations and around 1,900 schools; they included ministers and superintendents; about half the attendees were women.

During the morning sessions, association secretaries presented field reports. After lunch, several meetings were held, including one of the Joint Baptist and Congregational Superintendents' Unions of Boston. Four addresses were given by members of the Editorial Association, whose annual meeting had been held in Clifton since June 16. The addresses discussed proposed improvements to Sunday school teaching methods. Reverend Thomas B. Neely, editor of the Methodist Episcopal Lesson Helps, read the resolutions that resulted from the Editorial Association's meeting: the association endorsed the international uniform lesson system (for more on "uniform lessons", see Sunday school#United_States), and proposed the division of Sunday school into five grades.

== Fourth conference (1905) ==
Hartshorn held the fourth Clifton conference on August 25, 1905, which concluded with a plan to invest $100,000 a year in Sunday schools over three years. According to the Boston Globe, attendees included "representative businessmen from all sections of the United States and Canada".

== Fifth conference (1908) ==
Book written about the fifth conference

The fifth Clifton Conference was held on August 18–20, 1908, and was dedicated to the topic of "the religious education of the Negro race". In attendance were about 70 educators, church leaders, and laymen from the Southern and Northern United States. About a third of attendees were African American. Represented were 34 schools for African Americans in seventeen states, 9 missionary organizations, and 12 denominations. Historian Sally McMillen described the conference as a "small and exclusive gathering" of leaders who were "renowned in Sunday school and church circles". The conference was chaired by Reverend John E. White, "an enthusiastic believer in the alliance of the best elements among both races".

During the conference, the delegates discussed ways to improve the education of Black people by improving Sunday school instruction.

The conference issued a unanimous declaration:

(1) That we gratefully recognize the phenomenal progress of the Negro race since emancipation, and the excellent work that is being done by the educational institutions for the Negro in Bible instruction;

(2) That the fundamental need in the present condition of the Negro is the development of right moral motives and high standards in the mass of the race;

(3) That the permanent uplifting of the race must be through the moral and religious instruction of the children and youth in their homes, schools, and churches;

(4) That the Sunday-school, when properly organized and conducted, is a great and effective agency for imparting the principles of the Christian religion and the saving knowledge of God's Word.

In view of this declaration, the Conference recommends:

That the International Sunday-School Association be requested, through its Committee on Work among Negroes, to co-operate with the committee appointed by this Conference in carrying out plans for the inauguration of systematic and thorough courses of Sunday-school training and instruction in colleges and schools for Negroes.

— "The Findings of the Conference", agreed upon by all attendees

A committee of nine, headed by Reverend White, was tasked with implementing the resolutions passed at the conference.

The conference was highly regarded by Bishop George W. Clinton of the AME Zion Church, who stated that it was "the best thing that has been done for us, the colored people, since Abraham Lincoln wrote his emancipation proclamation." Alexander's Magazine, in its September 15 issue, covered the conference in great detail and praised Hartshorn's plan as "one of the most liberal and far-reaching" proposals presented.

The proceedings of the conference were published in 1910 under the title An Era of Promise and Progress.

=== Notable attendees ===
- John W. E. Bowen, president of Gammon Theological Seminary
- Henry A. Boyd, son of R. H Boyd and successor as leader of the National Baptist Convention of America
- R. H. Boyd, minister, founder and head of the National Baptist Convention of America
- William H. Brooks, Methodist Episcopal pastor and a founder of the NAACP
- Needham B. Broughton, long-time secretary of the Southern Baptist Convention
- Nathan W. Collier, president Florida Normal and Technical Institute (now Florida Memorial University)
- William Goodell Frost, Greek scholar and president of Berea College
- Thomas O. Fuller, minister, North Carolina state senator (1899-1900)
- Wesley John Gaines, pastor at the African Methodist Episcopal Church (and later bishop)
- Harriet E. Giles, co-founder of Spelman College
- William Henry Heard, minister and United States Ambassador to Liberia (1895 to 1898)
- Oliver Otis Howard, Union major general
- John Hope, educator and political activist
- W. A. C. Hughes, Methodist bishop
- Willard F. Mallalieu, Methodist Episcopal Church bishop
- Robert Daniel Johnston, Confederate brigadier general
- Henry H. Proctor, pastor of Atlanta's First Congregational Church

=== Legacy ===
After the conference, ISSA began working with black schools and other institutions to train additional Sunday school teachers. By 1922, 35,000 African-Americans had taken an ISSA teacher training class.

In 1910, Hartshorn published a book based on the conferences and focusing on "progress and promise" among African Americans from the Civil War era to 1910.

== Publications ==
- Hartshorn, William Newton; Penniman, George W., eds. (1910). An Era of Progress and Promise: 1863-1910 (PDF). Boston, Massachusetts: The Priscilla Publishing Co.

== See also ==
- American Baptist Home Mission Society
- Colored Conventions Movement
