= European Civil Affairs Division =

WWII allied military unit

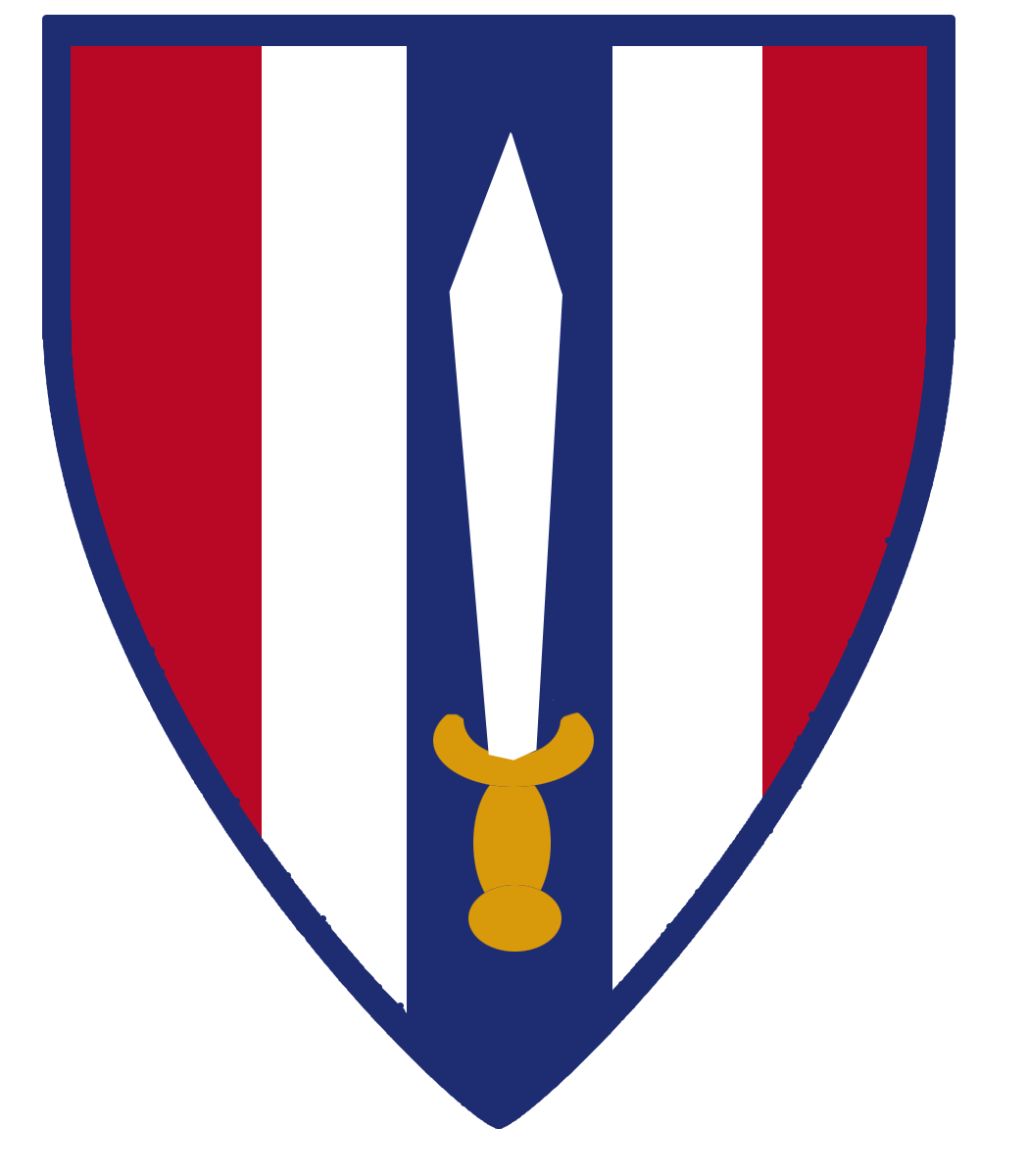
- Active: February 1944 - July 1945
- Country: United States
- Branch: United States Army
- Role: Civil Affairs
- Part of: European Theater of Operations, United States Army
- Garrison/HQ: Shrivenham, England; Manchester, England

Commanders
- Notable commanders: Col. Cuthbert Stearns Feb.-May 1944 Col. Henry Pendleton May 1944 - July 1945

The European Civil Affairs Division (ECAD) was a unit assigned to the European Theater of Operations (ETO) from February 1944 to July 1945.

ECAD was created in Shrivenham, England before D-Day and Colonel Cuthbert P. Stearns was its first commander.

After the Normandy invasion, ECAD began to move into the formerly Nazi controlled areas beginning on September 9, 1944 to set up civil government run by the US Army until such time as it was practical to allow local administration. As the US Army moved east, the amount of former Nazi held territory grew and ECAD could not keep up with the need for specialists in medical, educational, sanitation, and every other type of civil management.

ECAD enlisted personnel were required to score in Group II on the Army General Classification Test (AGCT) meaning they were above average. Most had been college students or white collar workers before enlisting.

Fighting against disease was just as important to the ECAD as de-Nazifying the populace and installing working governance. The ECAD found typhus outbreaks as well as a lack of food and drinking water. In August 1944, ECAD set up a School of Military Government near Paris to help with the issue.

Each ECAD detachment be in charge of a specific area and in that area carry out the essential functions of public safety, health, food distribution, restoring utilities, coordinate local labor, restore agriculture, set up military courts, secure financial institutions and property and begin restoring local governance.

== Subordinate Units ==
- 6901st European Civil Affairs Regiment (later 1st European Civil Affairs Regiment) deployed with 14th Military Government (First Army)
- 6902nd European Civil Affairs Regiment (later 2nd European Civil Affairs Regiment) deployed with Third Army
- 6903rd European Civil Affairs Regiment (later 3rd European Civil Affairs Regiment) deployed with Sixth Army

Special Detachments

- 6904th Civil Affairs Detachment (Administrative Support)
- 6905th Transportation Company
- 6906th Occupational Reserve Unit (Civil Affairs Center)
- 6907th Special Mission Detachment (Norway)
- 6908th Special Mission Detachment (Denmark)
- 6910th Special Mission Detachment (Belgium)
- 6911th Special Mission Detachment (Germany)
- 6912th Special Mission Detachment (France)
- European Civil Affairs Medical Group
- Civil Affairs Port and Supply H
- Regimental Reserve Detachment
- European Civil Affairs Currency Section
