= Morrisby Profile =

Series of cognitive aptitude tests

Morrisby Logo

The Morrisby Profile is a matched series of timed cognitive aptitude tests. The current version is screen-based and was first published in 2014. In this version, five different aptitudes are assessed: verbal, numerical, abstract, spatial and mechanical. The assessments each present a series of items and the candidate selects their answer from the options provided. The first three tests have two parts each. Each section is preceded by some untimed practice items. The results are normed against a standardisation sample. Norms are available to a lower limit of 14 years of age.

== Questionnaires ==
The five aptitude assessments are presented alongside an untimed careers interest questionnaire. This is a Likert scale based questionnaire of up to 103 questions. The results are ipsative and indicate relative strength of interest in 10 career interest categories, 5 workstyle and 4 workplace dimensions. An optional, untimed Personality Test is also available.

The total administration time for the five aptitude assessments and both questionnaires is typically a little under 1 hour 40 minutes.

== Quality ==
The Morrisby Profile in paper form has a PTC Registration with the British Psychological Society

== History ==
The Morrisby Profile is derived from the Differential Test Battery developed by John Morrisby in the UK and first published in 1955. This was heavily revised, although following a similar format to its precursor, and renamed Morrisby Profile in 1991. A further revision occurred in 2005 which was finally discontinued in 2020. All these versions were paper and pencil based and comprised six aptitude tests coupled with 4 personality metrics and a pair of optional dexterity tests. The current online version has been available since 2014.
