= William Newton Hartshorn =

American Baptist leader (1843-1920)

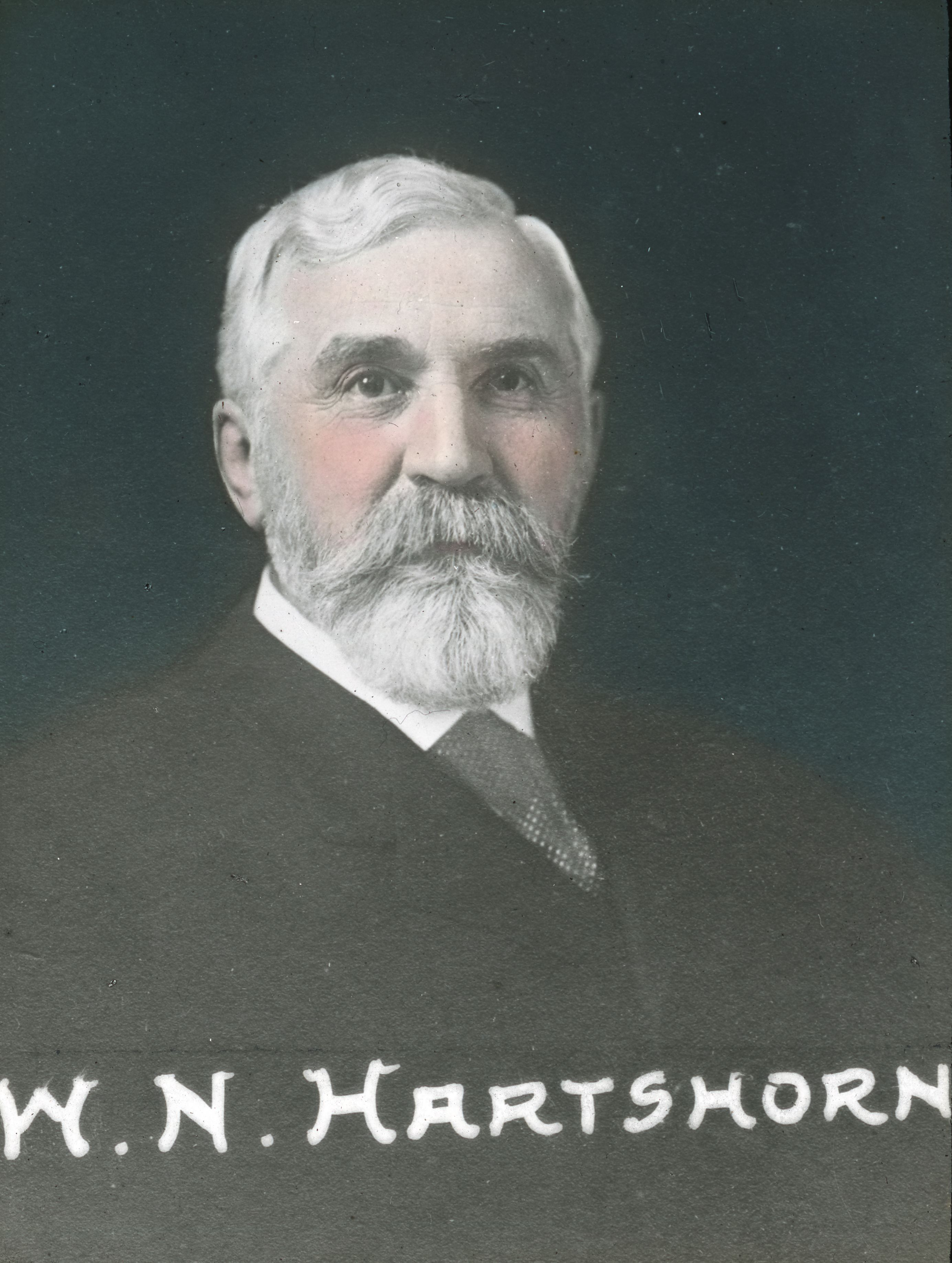
William Newton Hartshorn photographed by Edmund F. Arras (1913)

William Newton Hartshorn (October 28, 1843 – September 1920) was a Baptist leader from the United States who travelled the world and became a millionaire advocating Sunday school and leading the "Sabbath army". He was born in Greenville, New Hampshire. He lived in Boston. He led a large tour and convention through Palestine and published an account of the journey with Louis Klopsch. He was an executive officer at the Priscilla Publishing Company in Boston.

He had a summer home at Clifton on the North Shore of Massachusetts known as "Dike Rock".

In 1898 and 1899 he was issuing a publication called Household.

He hosted the Clifton Conference series of religious gatherings between 1901 and 1908. After the last conference, he published a book about "progress and promise" among African Americans from the Civil War era to 1910.

== Publications ==
- W. N. Hartshorn, ed. 1910. Era of Progress and Promise, 1863-1910: The religious, moral, and educational development of the American Negro since his emancipation (The Clifton Conference). Boston: Priscilla Pub. Co. George W. Penniman, associate editor
- The Story of an Alcohol Slave: As told by himself
- The Cruise of the Eight Hundred to and Through Palestine; Glimpses of Bible Lands, by Hartshorn and Louis Klopsch
