= Mechanical aptitude =

According to Paul Muchinsky in his textbook Psychology Applied to Work, "mechanical aptitude tests require a person to recognize which mechanical principle is suggested by a test item." The underlying concepts measured by these items include sounds and heat conduction, velocity, gravity, and force.

A number of tests of mechanical comprehension and mechanical aptitude have been developed and are predictive of performance in manufacturing/production and technical type jobs, for instance.

== Background information ==
=== Military information ===
Aptitude tests have been used for military purposes since World War I to screen recruits for military service. The Army Alpha and Army Beta tests were developed in 1917-1918 so ability of personnel could be measured by commanders. The Army Alpha was a test that assessed verbal ability, numerical ability, ability to follow directions, and general knowledge of specific information. The Army Beta was its non-verbal counterpart used to evaluate the aptitude of illiterate, unschooled, or non-English speaking draftees or volunteers.

During World War II, the Army Alpha and Beta tests were replaced by The Army General Classification Test (AGCT) and Navy General Classification Test (NGCT). The AGCT was described as a test of general learning ability, and was used by the Army and Marine Corps to assign recruits to military jobs. About 12 million recruits were tested using the AGCT during World War II, the NGCT was used by the Navy to assign recruits to military jobs sailors were tested using the NGCT during World War II.

Additional classification tests were developed early in World War II to supplement the AGCT and the NGCT. These included:

- Specialized aptitude tests related to the technical fields (mechanical, electrical, and later, electronics)
- Clerical and administrative tests, radio code operational tests
- Language tests and driver selection tests.

=== Mechanical aptitude and spatial relations ===
Mechanical aptitude tests are often coupled together with spatial relations tests. Mechanical aptitude is a complex function and is the sum of several different capacities, one of which is the ability to perceive spatial relations. Some research has shown that spatial ability is the most important part of mechanical aptitude for certain jobs. Because of this, spatial relations tests are often given separately, or in part with mechanical aptitude tests.

=== Gender differences ===
There is no evidence that states there is a general intelligence difference between men and women. However, studies have found that those with lower spatial ability usually do worse on mechanical reasoning. One study suggests that pre-natal androgens such as testosterone positively affect performance in both spatial and mechanical abilities.

== Uses ==
Sample question from a Mechanical Aptitude test

The major uses for mechanical aptitude testing are:

- Identify candidates with good spatial perception and mechanical reasoning ability
- Assess a candidate's working knowledge of basic mechanical operations and physical laws
- Recognize an aptitude for learning mechanical processes and tasks
- Predict employee success and appropriately align your workforce

These tests are used mostly for industries involving:

- Manufacturing/Production
- Energy/Utilities

The major occupations that these tests are relevant to are:

- Automotive and aircraft mechanics
- Engineers
- Installation/maintenance/repairpersons
- Industrial/technical (non-retail) sales representatives
- Skilled tradesperson such as electricians, welders, and carpenters
- Transportation trades/equipment operators such as truck driver and heavy equipment operator

== Types of tests ==
=== US Department of Defense Test of Mechanical Aptitude ===
The mechanical comprehension subtest of the Armed Services Vocational Aptitude Battery (ASVAB), is one of the most widely used mechanical aptitude tests in the world. The test consists of ten subject-specific tests that measure your knowledge of and ability to perform in different areas, and provides an indication of your level of academic ability. The military would ask that all recruits take this exam to help them be placed in the correct job while enrolled in the military. In the beginning, World War I, the U.S. Army developed the Army Alpha and Beta Tests, which grouped the draftees and recruits for military service. The Army Alpha test measured recruits' knowledge, verbal and numerical ability, and ability to follow directions using 212 multiple-choice questions.

However, during World War II, the U.S. Army replaced the tests with a newer and improved one called the Army General Classification Test. The test had many different versions until they improved it enough to be used regularly. The current tests consist of three different versions, two of which are on paper and pencil and the other is taken on the computer. The scores from each different version are linked together, so each score has the same meaning no matter which exam you take. Some people find that they score higher on the computer version of the test than the other two versions, which may be due to the fact that the computer based exam is tailored to their demonstrated ability level. These tests are beneficial because they help measure your potential; it gives you a good indicator of where your talents are. By viewing your scores, you can make intelligent career decisions. The higher score you have, the more job opportunities that are available to you.

=== Wiesen Test of Mechanical Aptitude ===
The Wiesen Test of Mechanical Aptitude is a measure of a person's mechanical aptitude, which is referred to as the ability use machinery properly and maintain the equipment in best working order. The test is 30 minutes and has 60 items that can help predict performance for specific occupations involving the operation, maintenance, and servicing of tools, equipment, and machinery. Occupations in these areas require and are facilitated by mechanical aptitude. The Wiesen Test of Mechanical Aptitude was designed with the intent to create an evolution of previous tests that helps to improve the shortcomings of these earlier mechanical aptitude tests, such as the Bennett Test of Mechanical Comprehension. This test was reorganized in order to lessen certain gender and racial biases. The reading level that is required for the Wiesen Test of Mechanical Aptitude has been estimated to be at a sixth-grade level, and it is also available in a Spanish-language version for Spanish-speaking mechanical workers. Overall, this mechanical aptitude test has been shown to have less of an adverse impact than previous mechanical aptitude tests.

There are two scores given to each individual taking the test, a raw score and a percentile ranking. The raw score is a measure of how many questions (out of the 60 total) the individual answered correctly, and the percentile ranking is a relative performance score that indicates how the individual's score rates in relation to the scores of other people who have taken this particular mechanical aptitude test.

Average test scores for the Wiesen Test of Mechanical Aptitude were determined by giving the test to a sample of 1,817 workers aged 18 and older working in specific industrial occupations that were mentioned previously. Using this sample of workers, it was determined that the Wiesen Test of Mechanical Aptitude has very high reliability (statistics) (.97) in determining mechanical aptitude in relation to performance of mechanical occupations.

=== Bennett Test of Mechanical Comprehension ===
The Bennett Mechanical Comprehension Test (BMCT) is an assessment tool for measuring a candidate's ability to perceive and understand the relationship of physical forces and mechanical elements in practical situations. This aptitude is important in jobs and training programs that require the understanding and application of mechanical principles. The current BMCT Forms, S and T, have been used to predict performance in a variety of vocational and technical training settings and have been popular selection tools for mechanical, technical, engineering, and similar occupations for many years.

The BMCT is composed of 68 items, 30-minute time limited test, that are illustrations of simple, encountered mechanisms used in many different mechanisms. It is not considered a speeded time test, but a timed power test and the cut scores will provide the different job requirements for employers. The reading and exercise level of concentration for this test is below or at a sixth-grade reading level.

In current studies of internal consistency reliability, the range of estimates were compared from previous studies and found out the range was from .84 to .92. So this shows a high reliable consistency when taking and measuring the BMCT. Muchinsky (1993) evaluated the relationships between the BMCT, a general mental ability test, and an aptitude classification test focused on mechanics, and supervisory ratings of overall performance for 192 manufacturing employees. Of the three tests, he found the BMCT to be the best single predictor of job performance (r = .38, p < .01). He also found that the incremental gain in predictability from the other tests was not significant.

From a current employer standpoint, these people are typically using cognitive ability tests, aptitude tests, personality tests etc. And the BMCT has been used for positions such as electrical and mechanical positions. Also companies will use these tests for computer operators and operators in manufacturing. This test can also help eliminate any issues or variables to employers about who may need further training and instruction or not. This test will help show employers who is a master of the trade they are applying for, and will also highlight the applicants who still have some "catching up" to do.

=== Stenquist Test of Mechanical Aptitude ===
The Stenquist Test consist of a series of problems presented in the form of pictures, where each respondent would try to determine which picture assimilates better with another group of pictures. The pictures are mostly common mechanical objects which do not have an affiliation with a particular trade or profession, nor does the visuals require any prior experience or knowledge. Other variations of the test are used to examine a person's keen perception of mechanical objects and their ability to reason out a mechanical problem. For example, The Stenquist Mechanical Assemblying Test Series III, which was created for young males, consisted of physical mechanical parts for the boys to individually construct items with.

== See also ==
- Spatial ability
