= Paul Marion (university administrator) =

4th President of Tiffin University
- In office July 1, 2002 – June 30, 2015
- Preceded by: George Kidd, Jr.
- Succeeded by: Curtis B. Charles

14th President of Franklin College (Indiana)
- In office September 1, 1997 – June 30, 2002
- Preceded by: William Bryan Martin

Personal details
- Spouse: Susan Marion
- Education: Davidson College, BA; California State University at Fresno, MA; University of Colorado Boulder, Ph.D.
- Profession: College administrator, Academic

Paul B. Marion, Jr. is an American university administrator and academic. During his long career in university administration, he served as director of higher education for the State of Arkansas, chancellor of the State College System of West Virginia, and presidents of the Pennsylvania Association of Colleges and Universities, Franklin College in Indiana and Tiffin University in Ohio.

== Early life ==
Marion is from Charlotte, North Carolina. He earned his bachelor of arts degree from Davidson College, a master of arts degree from California State University at Fresno, and a doctorate from the University of Colorado at Boulder.

== Career ==
Between 1968 and 1978, Marion held several administrative positions at California State University at Fresno, the World Campus Afloat (now Semester at Sea), the University of Colorado at Boulder, and North Carolina State University. He served as assistant vice president of the General Administration of the University of North Carolina system from 1978 until 1983, when he was named associate vice president of the institution.

Beginning in 1985, Marion served as the director of higher education for the State of Arkansas. In May 1990, he was selected to become chancellor of the State College System of West Virginia. As chancellor, Marion was head of ten institutions, which then included Bluefield State College, Concord College, Fairmont State College, Glenville State College, Shepherd College, Southern West Virginia Community College, West Liberty State College, West Virginia Tech, West Virginia Northern Community College, and West Virginia State College.

In 1993, he was appointed the president of the Pennsylvania Association of Colleges and Universities. The organization represented 116 public and private colleges and universities in Pennsylvania. Marion also taught courses at several universities, was a member of several professional associations, national and state boards and commissions, published articles in academic journals, and made many presentations at national, regional, and state higher education conferences.

In 1997, Marion was appointed the 14th president of Franklin College in Franklin, Indiana. Marion served as Franklin College’s president for five years in which he was able to increase student enrollment by twenty-seven percent and reorganize the departmental structure of the school, among his other accomplishments, before departing June 2002.

In July 2002, he became the fourth president of Tiffin University in Tiffin, Ohio. During his tenure, enrollment increased from 1,500 to more than 4,200 students, new facilities were constructed, several new academic programs were added, and the university joined the NCAA Division II and the Great Lakes Athletic Conference. In October 2014, Marion announced that he would retire at the end of the school year in summer 2015, after serving at the university for thirteen years. In 2016, the University dedicated the Marion Center in honor of the now-former university president and his wife.

== Personal life ==
Marion is married to Susan Marion, a former elementary and later high school teacher. They have two daughters; Martha Marion, an actor and voice actor in Los Angeles, California, and Katherine Marion, an executive at Lyft, Inc. After their retirement, they planned on moving to Tucson, Arizona.
