= Role-based assessment =

Modern psychological testing can be traced back to 1908 with the introduction of the first successful intelligence test, the Binet-Simon Scale. From the Binet-Simon came the revised version, the Stanford-Binet, which was used in the development of the Army Alpha and Army Beta tests used by the United States military. During World War I, Robert S. Woodworth developed the Woodworth Personal Data Sheet (WPDS), to determine which soldiers were better prepared to handle the stresses of combat. The WPDS signaled a shift in the focus of psychological testing from intellect to personality.

By the 1940s, the quantitative measurement of personality traits had become a central theme in psychology, and it has remained so into the 2000s. During this time, numerous variations and versions of 'personality tests' have been created, including the widely used Myers-Briggs, DISC, and Cattell's 16PF Questionnaire.

Role-Based Assessment (RBA) differs significantly from personality testing. Instead of quantifying individual personality factors, RBA's methodology was developed, from its very beginnings, to make qualitative observations of human interaction. In this sense, RBA is a form of behavioral simulation. Understanding the quality of a person's behavior on a team can be a valuable adjunct to other forms of evaluation (such as data on experience, knowledge, skills, and personality) because the ability to successfully cooperate and collaborate with others is fundamental to organizational performance.

== Concepts ==
=== Coherence ===
In TGI Role-Based Assessment, 'Coherence' describes a positive and constructive orientation to working with others to achieve common goals, overcome obstacles, and meet organizational needs.

=== Role ===
A person's 'Role' describes their strongest affinity for, or attraction to, serving a certain type of organizational need, e.g., planning for the future vs. executing current tasks vs. preserving and sharing knowledge.

=== Teaming Characteristics ===
Each RBA report includes a detailed section on 'Teaming Characteristics', which are derived, in part, from the relationship between a person's level of Coherence and their unique Role (or Roles). As their name suggests, Teaming Characteristics can help managers and coaches to understand how well a person will 'fit' within a team and/or adapt to their job responsibilities.

== Historical Development ==
Dr. Janice Presser began collaborating with Dr. Jack Gerber in 1988 to develop tools and methods for measuring the fundamental elements of human 'teaming' behavior, with a goal of improving individual and team performance. Their work combines decodes of research, blending Dr. Presser's earlier work in family and social relationships with Dr. Gerber's 'Mosaic Figures' test, which had been designed to produce qualitative information on how individuals view other people.

Three generations of assessments were developed, tested and used in the context of actual business performance. The initial Executive Behavior Assessment was focused on the behavior of persons with broad responsibility for organizational performance. The second iteration, called the Enhanced Executive Behavior Assessment, incorporated metrics on the behavior of executives working in teams. Drs. Presser and Gerber then successfully applied their testing methodology to team contributors outside of the executive ranks, and as development and testing efforts continued, Role-Based Assessment (RBA) emerged.

By 1999, RBA was established as a paper-based assessment, and was being sold for use in pre-hire screening and organizational development. Drs Presser and Gerber formed The Gabriel Institute in 2001, with the goal of making RBA available to a greater audience via the Internet.

Mid-year in 2009, TGI Role-Based Assessment became generally available as an online assessment instrument. Later in 2009, the Society for Human Resource Management (SHRM) published a two-part white paper by Dr. Presser, which introduced ground- breaking ideas on the measurement and valuation of human synergy in organizations, and an approach to the creation of a strong, positively oriented human infrastructure.

== Applications ==
The most common use of TGI Role-Based Assessment is in pre-hire screening evaluations. RBA's focus on 'teaming' behavior offers a different way to allegedly predict how an individual will fit with company culture, on a given team, and how they are likely to respond to specific job requirements. While other pre-hire testing may run the "risk of violating the ADA" (Americans with Disabilities Act), this does not appear to be an issue with Role-Based Assessment.

RBA is also claimed to have unique potential for strengthening a human infrastructure. Results from RBA reports can be aggregated, providing quantitative data that is used for analysis and resolution of team performance problems, and to identify and select candidates for promotion.

== See also ==
- Personality Testing
- Cattell's 16 Personality Factors
- Performance Improvement
