= Willard Francis Mallalieu =

American bishop

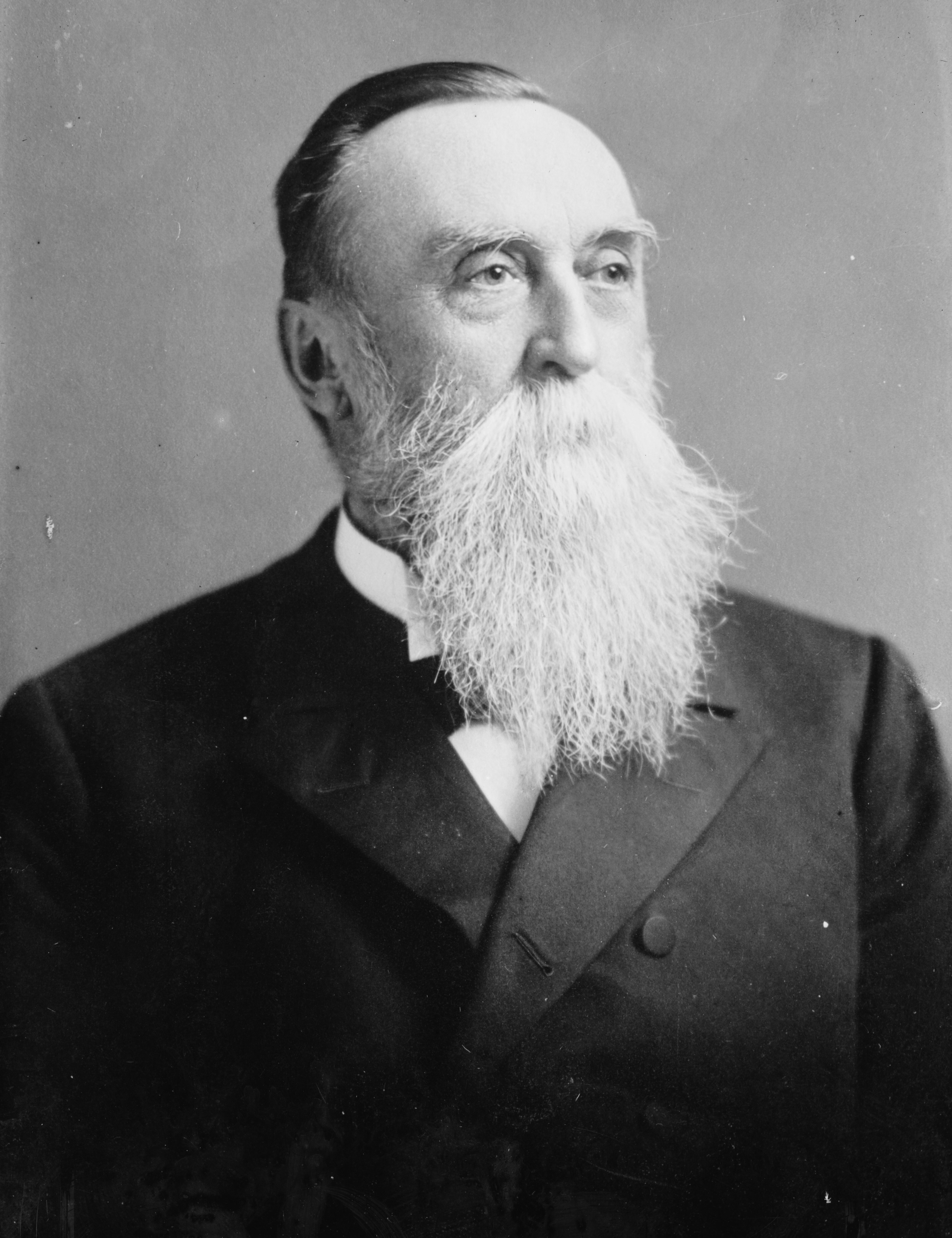

Willard Francis Mallalieu (December 11, 1828 – August 1, 1911) was an American bishop of the Methodist Episcopal Church, elected in 1884.

Willard was born in Sutton, Massachusetts. He was of Puritan and Huguenot ancestry. He was converted to Christ at the age of twelve, having indicated his desire to seek Jesus Christ at the first Methodist class meeting he ever attended (held in the kitchen of a neighborhood widow). After preparatory training at East Greenwich Academy, Willard entered the Wesleyan University at Middletown, Connecticut, from which he graduated.

Willard was the grandson of Jonatahan and ‘Mallie’ Mallalieu of Delph, Oldham, Greater Manchester United Kingdom. Willard paid for the election of a headstone for Mallie in the Churchyard of St Thomas in Friarmere, less than 1 km from Delph. The headstone states that Mallie died on 8 January 1845 at the age of 82 and Willard is listed as ‘W F Mallalieu D.D. Bishop of the Methodist Episcopal Church USA’.

The Rev. Mallalieu entered the New England Annual Conference of the M.E. Church in 1858. He spent twenty-four years in the pastorate, serving just two years as a presiding elder. He declined educational positions which were offered to him. The Rev. Mallalieu became favorably known to his denomination through able contributions to Methodist periodicals. He was also notable as a platform speaker at places like Chautauqua and elsewhere. He was also a valued friend of Bishop Gilbert Haven, appointed to prepare the memorial of him for the General Conference of 1880. Rev. Mallalieu was a delegate to the General Conferences of 1872, and 1884 (when he was at the head of his delegation). He was thought of as "a practical wide-awake minister, [who] makes a good speech in a way that assures you he could preach a better sermon..."

The Rev. Mr. Willard Francis Mallalieu was elected to the episcopacy by the 1884 General Conference of the Methodist Episcopal Church.

== See also ==
- List of bishops of the United Methodist Church
