= Clifton, Massachusetts =

Tram stop in Massachusetts, United States

Coordinates: 42°29′00″N 70°52′48″W

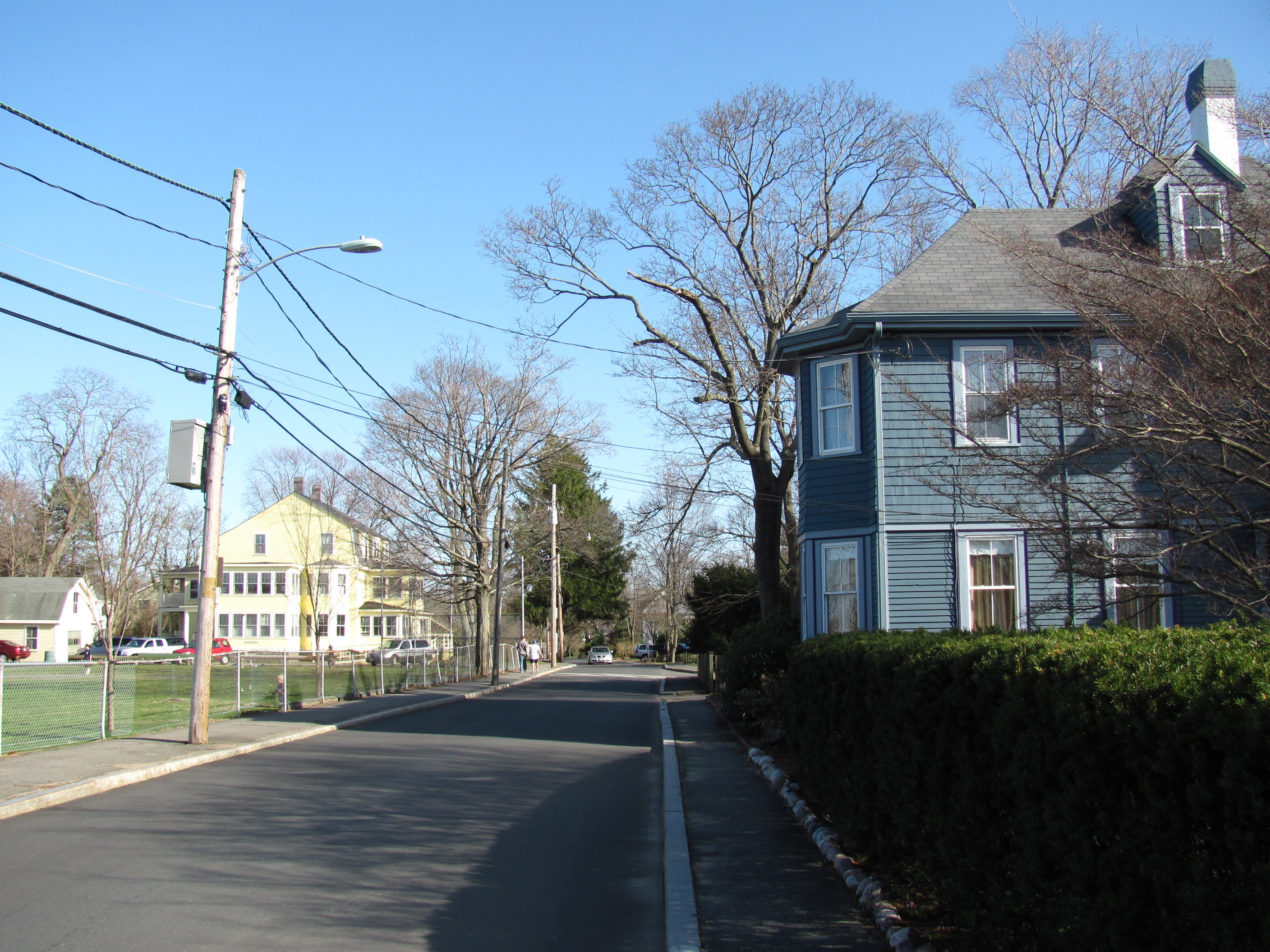
Clifton Avenue

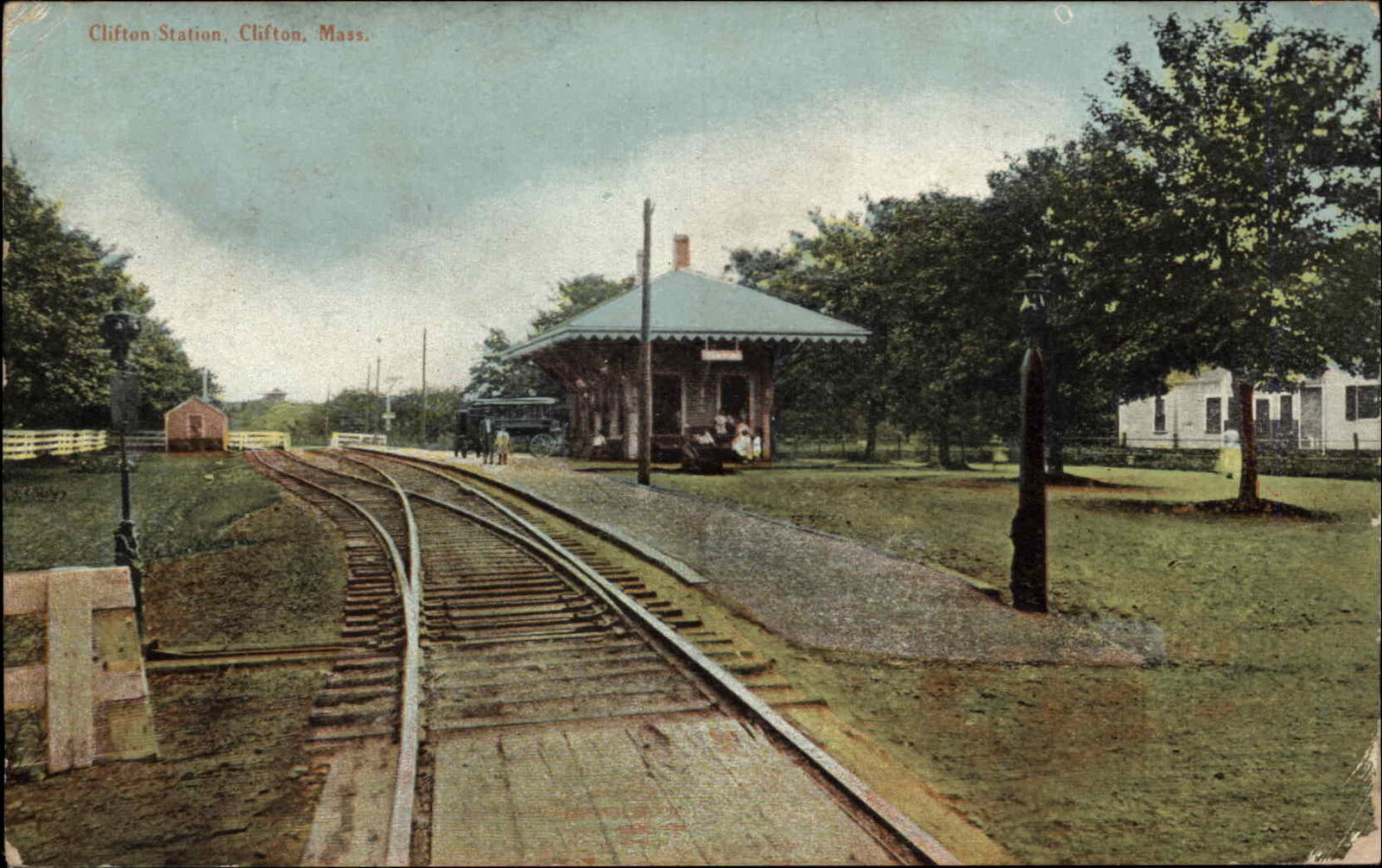
Clifton Station in a 1910 postcard

Clifton was a street car stop within the towns of Swampscott and Marblehead in Essex County, Massachusetts, United States. It includes Clifton Avenue.

The area was named by Benjamin Ware, a hotelier who developed Clifton with the intention of creating a resort area. His hotel, "Clifton House", was regaled as one of the finest lodgings in the county. In 1884, Ware attempted to subjugate all of Marblehead Neck, and the southeastern coastline of the town, along with his resort community, and form the Town of Clifton Village. The Committee on Towns eventually denied his proposal. Attractions in the area included the Clifton House. There has been no mention as Clifton as a place, and it is not known as a village, formally or informally, by any of the residents in the area.

The book An Era of Progress and Promise, 1863-1910 published following the Clifton Conference

In 1908 the Clifton Conference, addressing the education of African Americans, was held in Clifton at the home of William N. Hartshorn. A branch of the Portland division of the Boston & Maine Railroad had a station in Clifton in the 1920s. The site of the station can be seen from Clifton Avenue and the track bed is now a bike path that extends from neighboring Swampscott station in the south to Salem in the north.

Various definitions of the unincorporated community may include the whole of the southeastern ocean front of Marblehead and incorporates the areas known as Greystone, Clifton Heights (Peabody Camp), Clifton and Rockaway. There are a number of associations that serve to preserve and improve these neighborhoods: Clifton Improvement Association and Clifton Heights Improvement Association are of particular note for the work they have done.

== Notable person ==
- William Newton Hartshorn, Baptist leader; spent summers in Clifton
- Estelle Parsons, Actress, Grew up on Conant Street
