= Army General Classification Test =

American recruit intelligence assessment

The Army General Classification Test (AGCT) is an assessment created by the United States Army to evaluate the intelligence and comprehension of military recruits.

World War I and World War II created the need for this type of testing and provided a large body of test subjects. The early emphasis (World War I) was on determining the level of literacy (Alpha test) among a heterogeneous group. Illiterates were given another test (Army Beta); some enrollees were interviewed. Subsequent testing targeted aptitude in order to better fill roles, such as those provided by officers who obtained commissions from other than the United States military academies, or to meet the need for increasingly complicated skills that came along with technological progress, especially after World War II.

As with other measurement attempts, the AGCT ran into controversy during the era of the Vietnam War. Yet, the requirement did not abate, leading to improvements in the application and use of the standard testing methodology. The modern variant of this test is the Armed Services Vocational Aptitude Battery (ASVAB) that was first administered in 1960. Many high IQ societies, such as Mensa and Intertel, can map their entrance requirements to early AGCT scores. The AGCT was of interest to researchers because of the breadth of the test taker sample (1.75 million men took the original test).

== Army Alpha and Beta Intelligence Tests ==
The first intelligence tests were created during World War I to screen the thousands of soldiers being recruited by the United States military.

Robert Yerkes and a committee of six representatives developed two intelligence tests; the Army Alpha test and the Army Beta test to help the United States military screen incoming soldiers for "intellectual deficiencies, psychopathic tendencies, nervous intangibility, and inadequate self-control". The Alpha test was a verbal test for literate recruits and was divided into eight test categories, which included: following oral directions, arithmetical problems, practical judgments, synonyms and antonyms, disarranged sentences, number series completion, analogies and information, whereas the Beta test was a nonverbal test used for testing illiterate or non-English speaking recruits. The Beta test did not require those being tested to use written language, but rather the examinees completed tasks by using visual aids. The Beta Intelligence test was divided into seven subtests, which included: "Test 1- assessed the ability of army recruits to trace the path of a maze; Test 2- assessed the ability of cube analysis; Test 3-assessed the ability of pattern analysis using an X-O series; Test 4- assessed the ability of coding digits with symbols; Test 5- assessed the ability of number checking; Test 6-assessed the ability of pictorial completion; and Test 7- assessed the ability of geometrical construction".

Overall, the Army Alpha and the Army Beta tests were designed to find the mental age of military recruits and to assess incoming recruits for success in the US Military by testing one's ability to understand language, to perform reasoning with semantic and quantitative relationships, to make practical judgments, to infer rules and regulations, and to recall general information. The Army Alpha and the Army Beta tests have been criticized for being biased and for not predicting the actual success of incoming soldiers.

== Criticism ==
- The Mismeasure of Man by Stephen Jay Gould

== g-loading ==
The g-loading of the AGCT has not been calculated, although the percentiles of the ASVAB of the 1980s strongly overlaps with the AGCT. The ASVAB test has a g performance strongly comparable to formal intelligence tests. 39 years later, where Flynn effects would have predicted a systematic inflation of nearly 12 points, what was found was a simple fluctuation of the sign of the difference between the tests throughout the range.
