= Spatial ability =

Capacity to understand 3D relationships

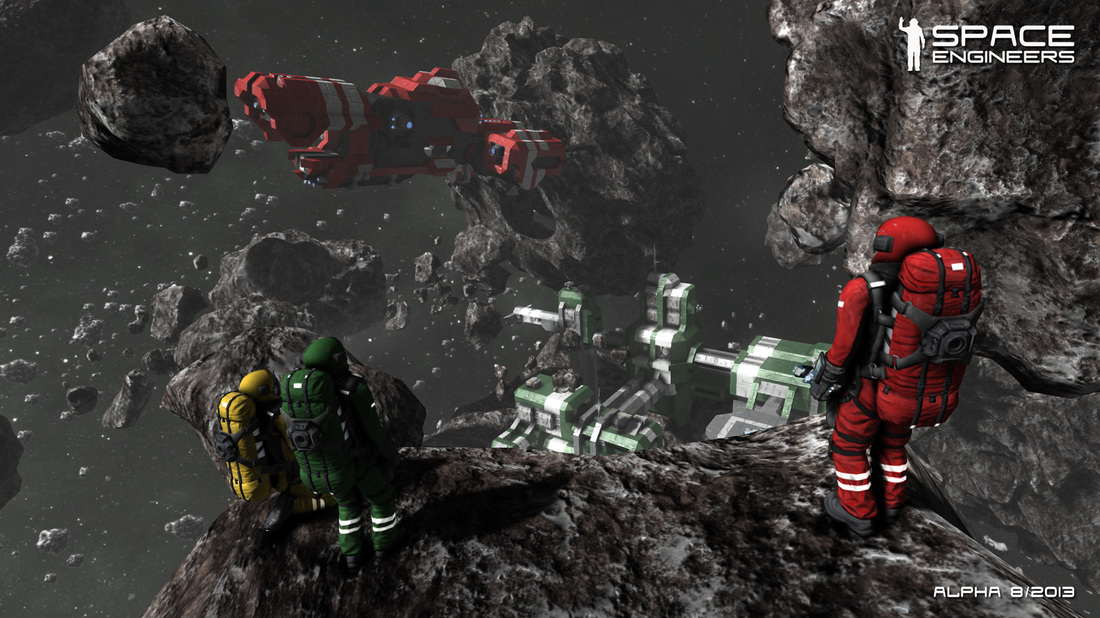
Space Engineers video game: 3D spatial navigation

Spatial ability or visuo-spatial ability is the capacity to understand, reason, and remember the visual and spatial relations among objects or space.

Visual-spatial abilities are used for everyday use from navigation, understanding or fixing equipment, understanding or estimating distance and measurement, and performing on a job. Spatial abilities are also important for success in fields such as sports, technical aptitude, mathematics, natural sciences, engineering, economic forecasting, meteorology, chemistry and physics.

== Definition and types ==
Spatial ability is the capacity to understand, reason and remember the visual and spatial relations among objects or space. There are four common types of spatial abilities: spatial or visuo-spatial perception, spatial visualization, mental folding and mental rotation. Each of these abilities has unique properties and importance to many types of tasks whether in certain jobs or everyday life. For example, spatial perception is defined as the ability to perceive spatial relationships with respect to the orientation of one's body despite distracting information. Mental rotation on the other hand is the mental ability to manipulate and rotate 2D or 3D objects in space quickly and accurately. Lastly, spatial visualization is characterized as complicated multi-step manipulations of spatially presented information. These three abilities are mediated and supported by a fourth spatial cognitive factor known as spatial working memory. Spatial working memory is the ability to temporarily store a certain amount of visual-spatial memories under attentional control in order to complete a task.

=== Spatial perception ===
Use of spatial perceptual skills in an action shooting game S.T.A.L.K.E.R. Mobile

Spatial perception is defined as the ability to perceive spatial relationships in respect to the orientation of one's body despite distracting information. It consists of being able to perceive and visually understand outside spatial information such as features, properties, measurement, shapes, position and motion. For example, when one is navigating through a dense forest they are using spatial perception and awareness. Another example is when trying to understand the relations and mechanics inside of a car, they are relying on their spatial perception to understand its visual framework. Tests that measure spatial perception include the rod and frame test, where subjects must place a rod vertically while viewing a frame orientation of 22 degrees in angle, or the water-level task, where subjects have to draw or identify a horizontal line in a tilted bottle.

Spatial perception is also very relevant in sports. For example, a study found that cricket players who were faster at picking up information from briefly presented visual displays were significantly better batsmen in an actual game. A 2015 study published in the Journal of Vision found that soccer players had higher perceptual ability for body kinematics such as processing multitasking crowd scenes which involve pedestrians crossing a street or complex dynamic visual scenes. Another study published in the Journal of Human Kinetics on fencing athletes found that achievement level was highly correlated with spatial perceptual skills such as visual discrimination, visual-spatial relationships, visual sequential memory, narrow attentional focus and visual information processing. A review published in the journal Neuropsychologia found that spatial perception also involves semantic processing and the attribution of meaning to an object. The review also found that spatial perception involves the human visual system in the brain and the parietal lobule which is responsible for visuomotor processing and visually goal-directed action. Studies have also found that individuals who played first person shooting games had better spatial perceptual skills like faster and more accurate performance in a peripheral and identification task while simultaneously performing a central search. Researchers suggested that, in addition to enhancing the ability to divide attention, playing action games significantly enhances perceptual skills like top-down guidance of attention to possible target locations.

=== Mental rotation ===
Rubik's Cube: a popular puzzle that involves 3D mental rotation

Mental rotation is the ability to mentally represent and rotate 2D and 3D objects in space quickly and accurately, while the object's features remain unchanged. Same effects have been seen playing action video games such as Unreal Tournament as well as the popular mainstream game Tetris. Jigsaw puzzles and Rubik's Cube are also activities that involve higher level of mental rotation and can be practiced to improve spatial abilities over time.

Mental rotation is also unique and distinct from the other spatial abilities because it also involves areas associated with motor simulation in the brain.

=== Spatial visualization ===
Spatial visualization is characterized as complicated multi-step manipulations of spatially presented information. It involves visual imagery which is the ability to mentally represent visual appearances of an object, and spatial imagery which consists of mentally representing spatial relations between the parts or locations of the objects or movements.

Another critical spatial visualization ability is mental animation. Mental animation is mentally visualizing the motion and movement of components within any form of system or in general. It is an ability highly crucial in mechanical reasoning and understanding, for example mental animation in mechanical tasks can involve deconstructing a pulley system mentally into smaller units and animating them in the corresponding sequence or laws in the mechanical system.

Mental folding is a complex spatial visualization that involves the folding of 2D pattern or material into 3D objects and representations. Compared to other studies, mental folding has had relatively little research and study. In comparison to mental rotation, mental folding is a non-rigid spatial transformation ability which means features of the manipulated object end up changing unlike mental rotation. In rigid manipulations, the object itself is not changed but rather its spatial position or orientation is, whereas in non-rigid transformations like mental folding the object and shapes are changed. Mental folding in tasks usually require a series of mental rotations to sequentially fold the object into a new one. Classic mental folding tests are the Paper folding task which is similar to Origami. Origami also requires mental folding by assessing folding a 2D paper enough times to create a 3D figure.

Visual penetrative ability is least common spatial visualization task which involves ability to imagine what is inside an object based on the features outside.

== Spatial working memory ==
Spatial working memory is the ability to temporarily store visual-spatial memories under attentional control, in order to complete a task. This cognitive ability mediates individual differences in the capacity for higher level spatial abilities, such as mental rotation. Spatial working memory involves storing large amounts of short-term spatial memories in relation to visuo-spatial sketchpad. It is used in the temporary storage and manipulation of visual-spatial information such as memorizing shapes, colours, location or motion of objects in space. It is also involved in tasks which consist of planning of spatial movements, like planning one's route through a complex building. The visuospatial sketchpad can be split into separate visual, spatial and possibly kin-aesthetic (movement) components. Its neurobiological function also correlates within the right hemisphere of the brain.

== Vocational applications ==
Spatial visualization is especially important in science and technology. Researchers have found that spatial ability plays an important role in advanced educational credentials in science, technology, engineering, and mathematics (STEM). From studies, it has been indicated that the probability of getting an advanced degree in STEM increases in positive relation to the level of one's spatial ability. For example, a 2009 study published in the Journal of Educational Psychology found that 45% of those with STEM PhDs were within top percentage of high spatial ability in a group of 400,000 participants who were analyzed for 11 years since they were in the 12th grade. Only less than 10% of those with STEM PhDs were below the top quarter in spatial ability during adolescence. The researchers then concluded how important spatial ability is for STEM and as a factor in achieving advanced educational success in that field.

Current literature also indicates that mathematics involves visuo-spatial processing. Studies have found that gifted students in math, for instance, perform better in spatial visualization than non-gifted students. A 2008 review published in the journal Neuroscience & Biobehavioural Reviews found that visuo-spatial processing was involved in mathematical reasoning. Another study found that numerical estimation might rely on integrating different visual-spatial cues (diameter, size, location, measurement) to infer an answer. A study published in 2014 also found evidence that mathematical calculation relies on the integration of various spatial processes. Another 2015 study published in the journal of Frontiers in Psychology also found that numerical processing and arithmetic performance may rely on visual perceptual ability.

A 2007 study published in the journal of Cognitive Science also found that spatial visualization ability is crucial for solving kinematic problems in physics. Nonetheless, current literature indicates that spatial abilities specifically mental rotation, is crucial for achieving success in various fields of chemistry, engineering and physics.

== See also ==
- Aphantasia – Inability to picture something in one's mind
- Mechanical aptitude
- Motor imagery – Mental process in which one rehearses a given action
- Raven's progressive matrices – Non-verbal test
- Spatial cognition – Acquisition, organization, and use of knowledge about spatial environments
- Spatial contextual awareness – Vicinity data in ubiquitous computing
