= Neuropsychology (journal) =

- Discipline: Neuropsychology
- Language: English
- Edited by: Steven Paul Woods

Publication details
- History: 1987-present
- Publisher: American Psychological Association (United States)
- Frequency: 8/year
- Impact factor: 3.0 (2024)

Standard abbreviations
- ISO 4: Neuropsychology

Indexing
- ISSN: 0894-4105 (print); 1931-1559 (web)
- OCLC no.: 48793510

Links
- Journal homepage; Online access

Neuropsychology (journal) is a peer-reviewed academic journal that was established in 1987 and covers neuropsychology. It is published by the American Psychological Association.

The journal has implemented the Transparency and Openness Promotion (TOP) Guidelines. The TOP Guidelines provide structure to research planning and reporting and aim to make research more transparent, accessible, and reproducible.

The current editor-in-chief is Steven Paul Woods. The journal publishes original, empirical research on the relation between brain and human cognitive, emotional, and behavioral function.

According to the Journal Citation Reports, the journal has a 2024 impact factor of 3.0.
