= Neural efficiency hypothesis =

Smart people like tough problems

The neural efficiency hypothesis proposes that while performing a cognitive task, individuals with higher intelligence levels exhibit lower brain activation in comparison to individuals with lower intelligence levels. This hypothesis suggests that individual differences in cognitive abilities are due to differences in the efficiency of neural processing. Essentially, individuals with higher cognitive abilities utilize fewer neural resources to perform a given task than those with lower cognitive abilities.

== History ==
Since the late 19th century, there has been a growing interest among psychologists to understand the influence of individual differences in intelligence and the underlying neural mechanisms of intelligence. The Neural efficiency hypothesis was first introduced by Haier et al. in 1988 through a Positron Emission Tomography (PET) study aimed at investigating the relationship between intelligence and brain activation. PET is a type of nuclear medicine procedure that measures the metabolic activity of the cells of body tissues.

During the study, participants underwent PET of the head while completing different cognitive tasks such as Raven's Advanced Progressive Matrices (RAPM) and Continuous Performance Tests (CPT). The PET Scans showed that task performance activated specific regions of the participant's brain. Also, a negative correlation was found between brain glucose metabolism levels and intelligence test scores. The results of the study indicated that individuals with higher intelligence levels exhibited lower levels of brain glucose metabolism while solving cognitive tasks. A few years later, Haier confirmed the results of the study by replicating it while considering learning as a factor.

== Research ==
The early studies mainly focused on certain cognitive tasks such as intelligence tests to test the hypothesis, potentially confounding efficiency during the intelligence-test performance with neural efficiency in general. To overcome this limitation recent studies have refined and expanded the hypothesis by applying and testing it in various domains.

In one study, researchers used a personal decision-making task to test the NEH which included questions about preferences like, "which profession do you prefer?". Subjective preferences were used to force participants to make decisions, and preference ratings were used to manipulate the level of decisional conflict. The study found that individuals with higher intelligence test scores displayed less brain activity during simple tasks and greater brain activity during complex tasks, compared to individuals with lower intelligence test scores. This suggested that smarter people can use their brains more effectively by turning on only the areas that are required for the activity at hand. Also, more intelligent people displayed quicker reaction times during challenging tasks. These findings offered fresh evidence in support of the NEH and indicated that the neural efficiency of highly intelligent people can be applied to tasks that are different from typical intelligence tests.

Another study focused on understanding the effect of long-term specialized training on an athlete's neural efficiency, using functional neuroimaging while performing a sport-specific task. The results of this study showed that athletes with prolonged experience or "experts" in their domains performed better than novices in terms of speed, accuracy, and efficiency, with lower activity levels in the sensory and motor cortex and less energy expenditure. These findings supported the Neural Efficiency Hypothesis (NEH) and proved that individuals who are highly skilled and experienced have more efficient brain functioning.

== Limitations ==
Recent studies on the Neural Efficiency Hypothesis have identified several limitations in the former research. They have also found several moderating variables, such as task complexity, sex and task type.

=== Task complexity ===
The difficulty level of the task is one of the key moderating variables that influence the neural efficiency hypothesis. In a study, it was found that the hypothesis only holds for easy tasks. For difficult tasks, intelligent individuals may show increased brain activation. The study revealed that participants with high IQ showed weaker activation during easy tasks but had a significant increase from easy to difficult tasks. This pattern was not observed in the average IQ group. The study suggests that the relationship between intelligence and brain activation depends on the difficulty of the task.

=== Sex and task type ===
Former studies have primarily used uniform tasks and have mainly focused on male participants. One study found that neural efficiency was influenced by sex and task content. The study tried to examine possible sex differences in human brain functioning. It aimed at investigating the relationship between intelligence and cortical activation during the cognitive performance in various versions of a task, using brain imaging techniques. The results of the study suggested that, In the verbal task, the females were more likely to produce cortical activation patterns consistent with the NEH. Whereas, in the figural task, the expected neural activation was primarily in the males in comparison to the female participants. This suggested the role of sex and task type as moderating variables.
