= University System of West Virginia =

Historic American educational authority

The University System of West Virginia was an American educational authority formed by the West Virginia Legislature on July 1, 1989, to oversee the operation of the state's graduate and doctoral degree-granting institutions. It was abolished on June 30, 2000. A 17-member Board of Trustees governed the following institutions of higher learning in West Virginia, United States:

- West Virginia University (WVU), including:
  - West Virginia University at Parkersburg (formerly Parkersburg Community College)
  - West Virginia University Institute of Technology (formerly West Virginia Institute of Technology), and
  - Potomac State College of West Virginia University
- Marshall University, including:
  - Marshall University Graduate College (formerly the University of West Virginia College of Graduate Studies), and
- West Virginia School of Osteopathic Medicine

From the foundation of the state's various colleges until 1970, all colleges, indeed all forms of education, from pre-school through the graduate programs at Marshall University were under a single state Board of Education, with the exception of West Virginia University and what is now known as West Virginia State University which were under separate Boards of Governors as land grant schools. Following the decision in Brown v. Board of Education State was desegregated, gave up its land grant status and was placed under the Board of Education as well.

In 1970, education governance was reformed and all colleges, including WVU, were placed under a single Board of Regents, with the state Board of Education focusing on primary and secondary education. This lasted until 1990, when the graduate level colleges were separated as The University System of West Virginia, and the remaining Board of Regents was renamed the "State and Community College System of West Virginia".

In 2000, the state abandoned the University System of West Virginia. The West Virginia Higher Education Policy Commission was established as its successor in overseeing higher education. Each institution received its own separate board of governors.

Since April 2019, both the Higher Education Policy Commission and the Community and Technical System have been led by Sarah Tucker who serves as the permanent Chancellor for the community colleges and the interim Chancellor for the four-year institutions.

== Regents Bachelor of Arts ==
The Regents Bachelor of Arts (RBA) degree is offered at all four-year public colleges and universities of the West Virginia Higher Education Policy Commission. It is a non-traditional degree designed for adult learners where students can enter the program four years after high school and earn credits in the classroom, and through life and work experiences.
