= Army Beta =

Military evaluation test

The Army Beta 1917 is the non-verbal complement of the Army Alpha—a group-administered test developed by Robert Yerkes and six other committee members to evaluate some 1.5 million military recruits in the United States during World War I. The Army used it to evaluate illiterate, unschooled, and non-English speaking army recruits. It has been recognized as an archetype of future cognitive ability tests. The time to administer the test was 50 to 60 minutes and was generally administered to 100–200 men in a group. The Army discontinued the test after World War I.

== Structure ==
The Army Beta is divided into seven tests. Administrators ask recruits to complete each test as quickly as they possibly can. The test subject uses a blackboard frame, blackboard chart, and cardboard pieces.

=== Test 1 ===
This test assessed the ability of army recruits to trace the path of a maze. To conduct the test, the administrator has a demonstrator trace a maze in front of the recruits slowly with a crayon. While doing so, at one point the demonstrator purposefully makes a mistake and waits until the administrator corrects him. After the administrator does so, the demonstrator traces the rest of the maze and indicates that it must be done quickly. After this, the administrator has the army recruits take the maze test in their books, by pointing to the subjects, then the books and telling them to "hurry up." While they take the test, the demonstrator attempts to rush the army recruits, and after two minutes, tells them to stop.

=== Test 2 ===
This test assesses the ability to do cube analysis. To administer this, the administrator points to a three-cube model on the blackboard and has the army recruits count how many cubes there are. He then does the same with a 12-cube model. After demonstrating how the test works, he has the recruits turn to the next page in their books and begin. The test has 17 items ascending difficulty: 1) 2-cube model, 2) 4-cube model, 3) 6-cube model, 4) 8-cube model, 5) 12-cube model, 6) 27-cube model, 7) 15-cube model, 8) 15-cube model, 9) 18-cube model, 10) 19-cube model, 11) 40-cube model, 12) 10-cube model, 13) 22-cube model, 14) 13-cube model, 15) 20-cube model, 16) 50-cube model. After 2 minutes and 30 seconds, the test is over and the administrator tells the recruits to stop.

=== Test 3 ===
This test assesses pattern analysis ability using an X-O series. The administrator first points to the blank rectangles at the end, then draws an O. The demonstrator then draws in the rest of the pattern. The administrator and the demonstrator do the same with another pattern using an X. The administrator then has the army recruits do the same with the problems in their books. After 1 minute and 45 seconds, the test is over and the administrator tells them to stop.

=== Test 4 ===
This assesses the ability to code digits with symbols. The administrator first points to the first digit of the key on a blackboard, then to the symbol under it. He then does the same for all nine digits in the key. Afterwards, the demonstrator fills in all the appropriate symbols for the digits. The administrator then has the recruits do the same with the problems in their books. After 2 minutes, the test is over and the administrator has them stop.

=== Test 5 ===
This test assesses number checking ability. If digits are the same for both groups of numbers, the recruits are to mark that they were the same with an X. The administrator began by trying to get a "Yes" or "No" response from the group when pointing to the first number of the first group and first number of the second group and asking if they are the same. If recruits give the wrong response, the administrator points to the two numbers again, and tells them the right answer. Afterwards, the administrator has the demonstrator make an imaginary cross to communicate with to the recruits that this was how to indicate they are the same. The administrator and demonstrator do this with three more sets—then the administrator points to the page and tells the recruits to begin. After 3 minutes, the test is over and the administrator tells them to stop.

=== Test 6 ===
This test assesses pictorial completion ability. Army recruits look at pictures with something missing and draw in the missing element. To administer this test, the administrator shows the demonstrator a picture of a hand with a missing finger and says, "Fix it." At first, the demonstrator does nothing and looks puzzled, then the administrator points to where the finger is missing and repeats to the demonstrator, "Fix it, fix it." The demonstrator then draw the missing finger. The administrator and demonstrator then do the same procedure for a fish that is missing an eye. The administrator has the demonstrator solve four more demonstration problems. Then the recruits solve the problems in their books. The test lasts 3 minutes, then the administrator tell them to stop. Examples of missing items in pictures include a missing mouth on a face, missing eyes on a face, missing nose on a face, missing strings on a violin, missing trigger on a gun and missing net on a tennis court.

=== Test 7 ===
This test assessed geometrical construction ability. Recruits make a rectangle out of pieces of cardboard. To administer this, the administrator draws a figure on the blackboard—then takes two pieces of cardboard and fits them together to look like the figure on the blackboard. The administrator then removes the pieces and signals the demonstrator to draw the solution on the blackboard. They repeat the procedure for the second and third samples, then the demonstrator works through the fourth sample alone. After the demonstrations, the recruits to do the same with the problems in their book. After two minutes, the test is over and the administrator tells them to stop.

== Grading ==
Test administrators graded the Army Beta tests on a numerical scale or intelligence scores—which, for practical military purposes, they translated into letter grades. An E grade recommended the subject for rejection, discharge, development battalion, or service organization. All men deemed satisfactory for regular military duty were graded D− or higher.

The table below lists several intelligence letter grades the Army used, with their score-equivalents and appropriate definitions.

Grade	Intelligence	Score (alpha)	Score (beta)	% of total	Description
A	Very superior	135–212	100–118	4% to 5%	Men of marked intellectuality. Of high officer type when they are also endowed with leadership and other necessary qualities.
B	Superior	105–134	90–99	8% to 10%	Less exceptional than that represented by "A". Many men of the commissioned officer type and a large amount of non-commissioned officer material.
C+	High average	75–104	80–89	15% to 18%	A large amount of non-commissioned officer material with occasionally a man whose leadership and power to command fit him for commissioned rank.
C	Average	45–74	65–79	About 25%	Excellent private type with a certain amount of fair non-commissioned officer material.
C−	Low average	25–44	45–64	About 25%	Below average intelligence, but usually good privates and satisfactory in work of a routine nature.
D	Inferior	15–24	20–44	About 15%	Likely to be fair soldiers, usually slow in learning and rarely go above the rank of private. Short on initiative and so need more than the usual amount of supervision. Many of them are illiterate or foreign.
D−	Very inferior	0–14	0–19		Very inferior in intelligence but considered fit for regular service
E	Very inferior	0–14	0–19		Men whose mental inferiority justifies their recommendation for development battalion, special service organization, rejection, or discharge.

The majority of "D−" and "E" men are below ten years in "mental age".

== Legacy ==
After the war, Yerkes wrote Psychological Examining in the United States army, which was published in 1921. The book documented the development of the army testing program, the creation of the tests, administration and stimuli, and validity data.

In the 1920s, columnist Walter Lippman was a prominent critic of intelligence tests, including the Army Alpha and Army Beta, arguing that they were insufficient for testing the real diversity of human intelligence. Lippman also raised the issue of whether intelligence was gained through nature or life experiences. Lippmann specifically criticized the way the test was misused, such as by Lothrop Stoddard.

== See also ==
Army General Classification Test
