= Biogeography of paravian dinosaurs =

Geographic distribution of paravian dinosaurs

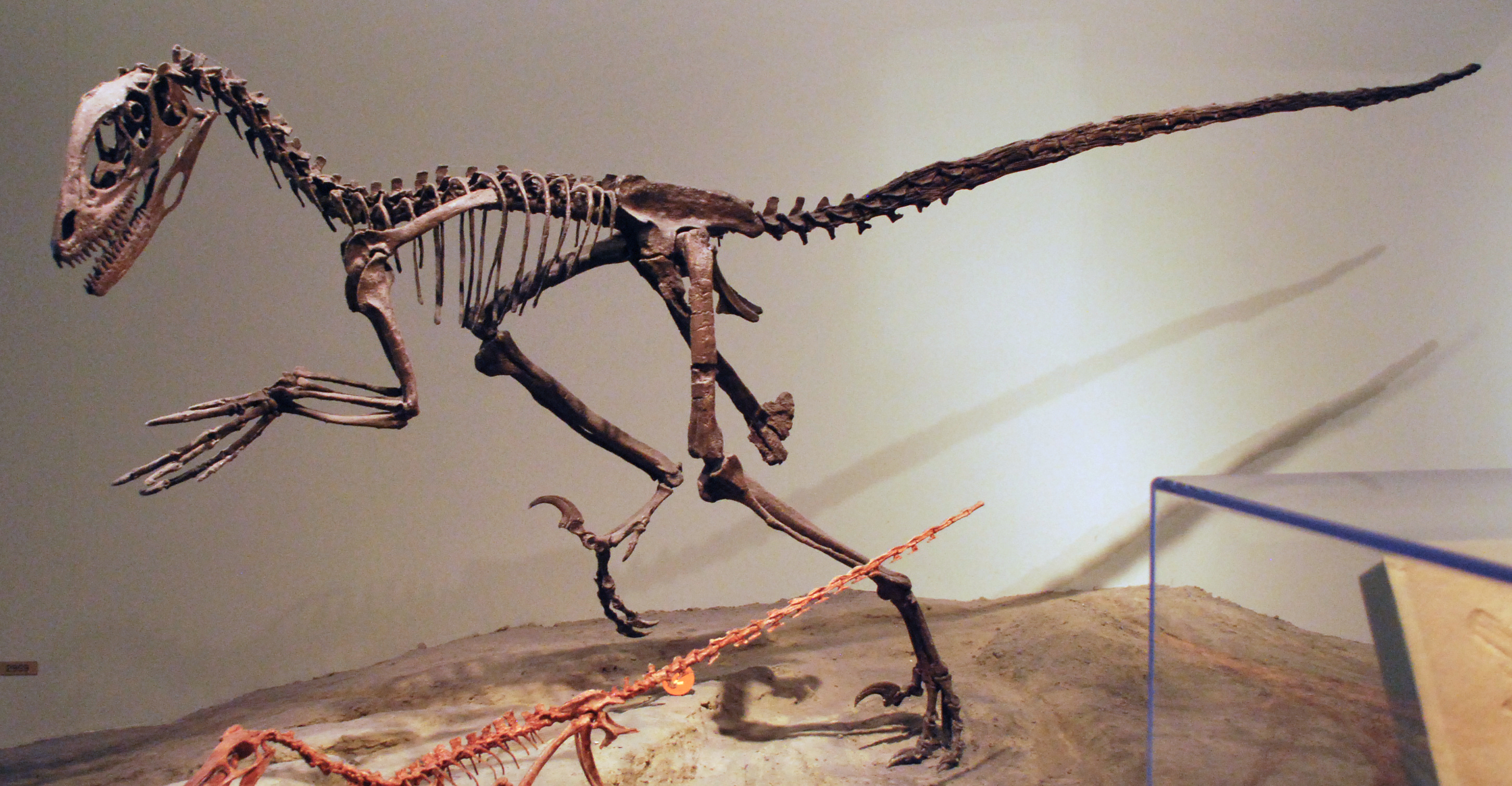
Fig. 1. Mounted skeleton cast of Deinonychus, Field Museum.

The biogeography of Paravian dinosaurs is the study of the global distribution of Paraves through geological history. Paraves is a clade that includes all of the Theropoda that are more closely related to birds than to oviraptorosaurs. These include Dromaeosauridae and Troodontidae (historically grouped under Deinonychosauria) and Avialae (including crown group birds, i.e. modern birds). The distribution of paraves is closely related to the evolution of the clade. Understanding the changes in their distributions may shed light on problems like how and why paraves evolve, eventually gaining the ability to fly.

Paraves first appeared in the fossil record in early Late Jurassic (163–145 million years ago), then rapidly diversified and dispersed during Cretaceous (145–66 million years ago). They emerged during the breakup of Pangea (since Early-Middle Jurassic), which influenced the biogeographic processes such as speciation, geodispersal and extinction. By the Late Cretaceous, Paraves reached global distribution with fossils found in modern Asia, Europe, Australia, Antarctica etc. Almost all Paravian dinosaurs died out before or during the end-Cretaceous mass extinction (~66 million years ago), also called the Cretaceous-Paleogene (K-Pg) mass extinction.

As a result of this extinction event, only a small group of avialans – neornithines – were able to survive. This group of Avialae continued to flourish in Cenozoic and later evolved into all modern birds.

There are limitations to be considered when studying the paleobiogeography of Paraves. Firstly, the fossil record may not represent the actual distribution of the three clades mainly due to taphonomic bias. Also, the fossil record may be incomplete, which may lead to misinterpretations.

== Vicariance and geodispersal ==
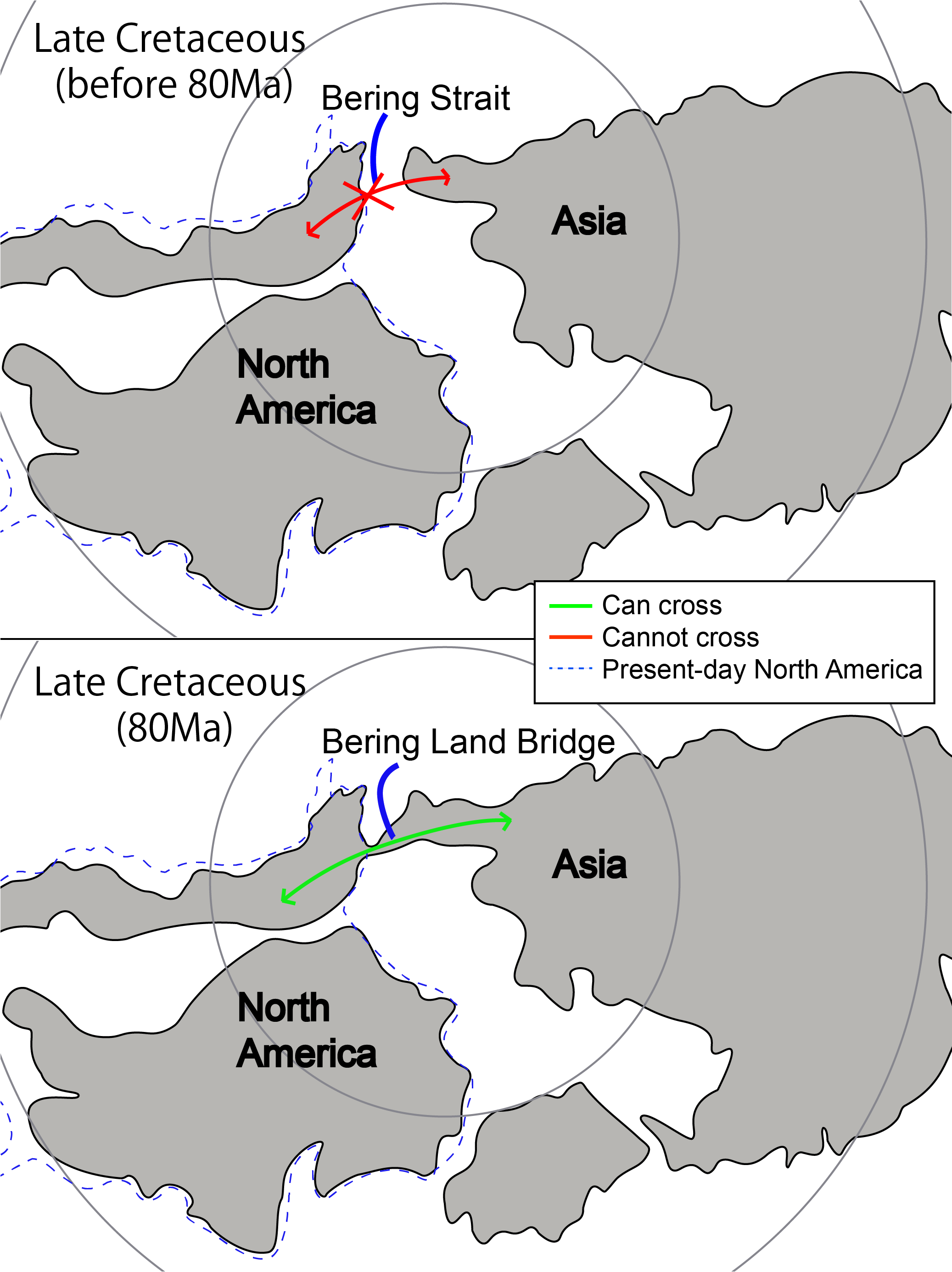
Fig. 3. The figure shows two maps viewed from the North Pole at early and mid-Late Cretaceous. It illustrates the concept of geodispersal through the formation of the Bering Land Bridge between Asia and North America. Modified from Wen et al. (2016).

Vicariance is a biogeographic process that occurs when a population is forced to separate into two or more groups due to geographic constraints. It is a key process in the biogeographic history of Paraves and one of the main hypotheses on the global distribution of dromaeosauridae in Late Mesozoic. Pangea broke up into Laurasia and Gondwana, creating an oceanic barrier in between the two landmasses where terrestrial faunal exchange was near impossible. In a regional scale, the collapse of land bridges can also cause vicariance.

Geodispersal is the process where populations migrate from their origins to other areas due to the removal of geophysical barriers like mountains and seas, connecting areas that are previously isolated. Unlike vicariance, geodispersal opens up gene flow by allowing populations that had never been in contact before to interact.

In reality, vicariance and geodispersal often occur together in repeated intervals. For example, the Bering Strait (Fig. 2) between North America and Asia acts as an oceanic barrier preventing terrestrial animals from crossing from one continent to another. Nonetheless, the channel was not present throughout the history of Earth. During Late Jurassic and Early Cretaceous, there were multiple occasions where the Bering Land Bridge formed between the two continents. The land bridge was made by tectonic movements in Late Mesozoic, and by lowering of global sea level due to climatic changes in Pleistocene. It acted as an overpass for land-dwellers to move from Asia to North America, and vice versa. Evidence for this was in the speciation of troodontids in Asia and North America respectively after the Bering Land Bridge broke off in the early Late Cretaceous. The land bridge was then repeatedly inundated and exposed since the breakup of Laurasia, contributing to the episodic exchange of fauna involving dinosaurs and mammals alike.

== Paleobiogeography ==
During the Early Mesozoic, the supercontinent Pangea just finished its assembly and almost immediately started breaking apart. The rifting began to take place during Early to Middle Jurassic (201–163 million years ago), and gradually formed two extensive landmasses – Laurasia and Gondwana. The continents then continued to be ripped apart into smaller land that resembled modern continents throughout late Mesozoic and Cenozoic. The breakup of continents did not happen uniformly, and modern continents were formed at different speeds while experiencing repeated collision and rifting. This phenomenon is closely related to the dispersal and evolution of Paraves.

=== Middle Jurassic ===
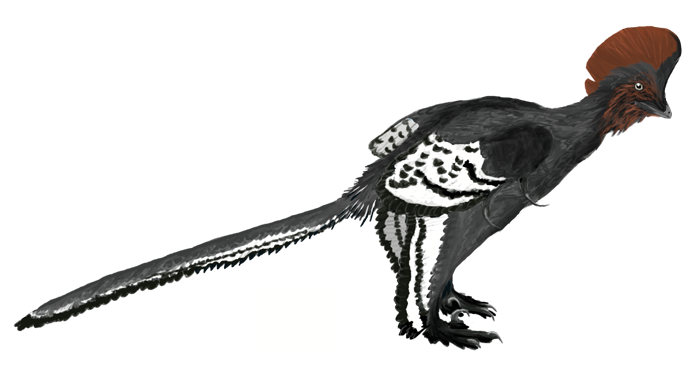
Reconstruction of Anchiornis huxleyi

There was a consensus among paleontologists that Paraves first appeared in Middle to Late Jurassic (174–145 million years ago). However, it was fairly recent when the clade Avialae was grouped under Paraves. With the discovery of Anchiornis (earliest feathered dinosaur with four wings) in Tiaojishan Formation in China, scientists were able to identify the appearance of Paraves within the Middle Jurassic. Anchiornis is a feathered dinosaur with anatomical features similar to that of Archaeopteryx, historically the oldest known avialan. Initially considered a basal troodontid, many paleontologists have also considered it an early avialan. Feathered dinosaurs have helped to confirm that the dinosaur-to-bird hypothesis is almost certainly true.

Anchiornis is seen as one of the first paravian dinosaurs to have ever existed, along with several other genera from the same family (Anchiornithidae) such as Aurornis and Caihong. Their fossils were found in the same rock formation in China, suggesting that Paraves likely originated from Asia.

Following the appearance of Anchiornis and other basal paravians, a series of vicariance events were inferred to have taken place. The widespread distribution and speciation of Dromaeosauridae and Troodontidae in Late Mesozoic coincided with the timing of the Pangean breakup, thus giving rise to the hypothesis of allopatric speciation initiated by continental fragmentation.

=== Late Jurassic ===
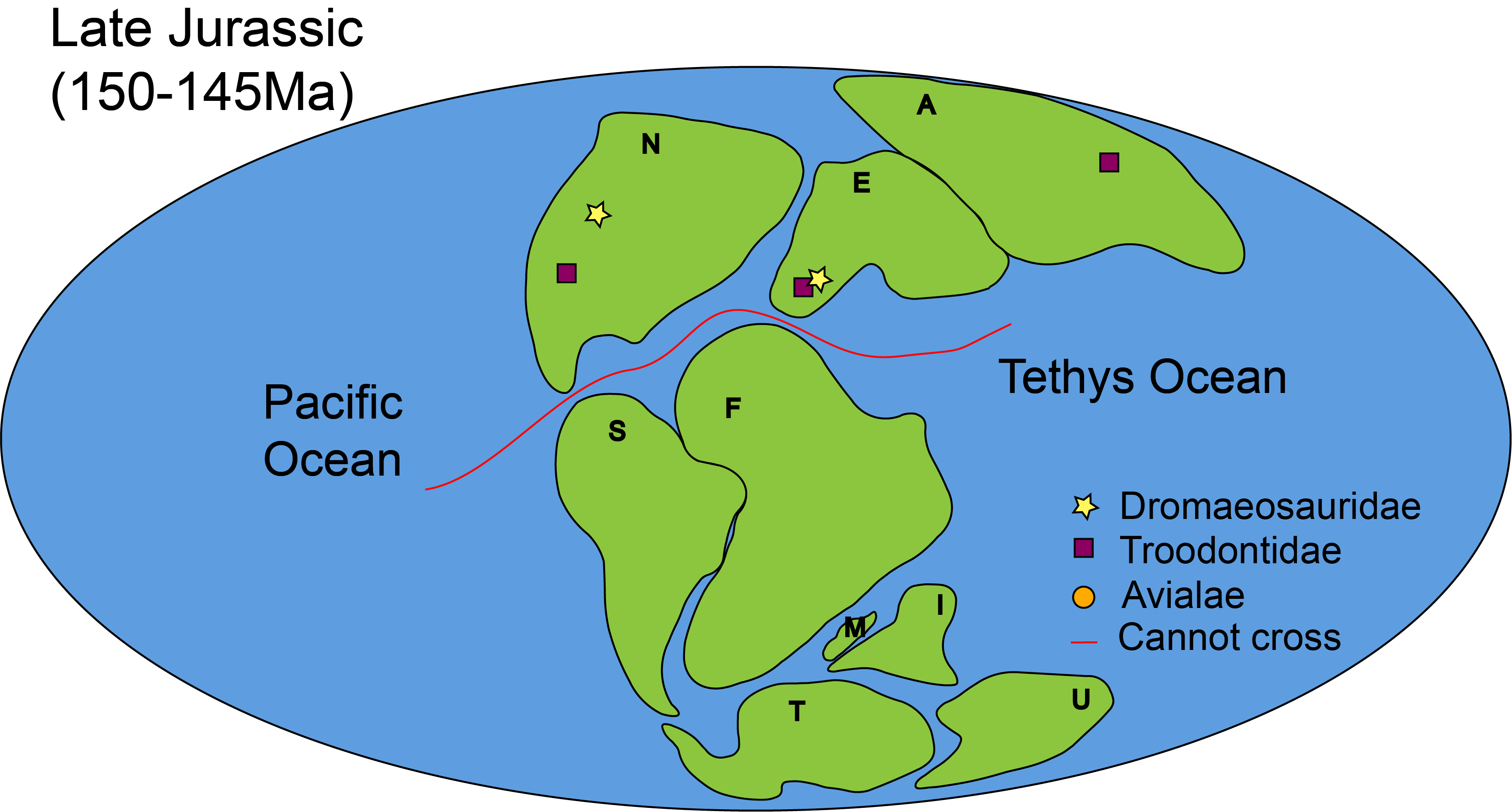
Fig. 5. A map showing the distribution of dromaeosauridae, troodontidae and avialae respectively at the end of Late Jurassic. The red line indicates the separation of Laurasia and Gondwana (no faunal exchange on land). Abbreviations: N, North America; S, South America; A, Asia; E, Europe; F, Africa; T, Antarctica; U, Australia; I, India; M, Madagascar. Modified from Ding et al. (2019).

During Late Jurassic (163–145 million years ago), the land was mostly separated into Laurasia (north) and Gondwana (south). In addition to that, the North Atlantic Ocean was ripped open by the separation of North America and Eurasia. In terms of biodiversity, Paraves began to speciate into three distinct clades: Dromaeosauridae, Troodontidae and Avialae.

Table 1. Distribution of each clade in Late Jurassic
Continent	Dromaeosauriade	Troodontidae	Avialae
Asia		✓	
Europe	✓	✓	✓
Africa			
North America	✓	✓	
South America			
Antarctica			
Australia			

The oldest Archaeopteryx (Avialae) was found in the Solnhofen Limestone in Germany, while the oldest evidence of Dromaeosauridae was unearthed in the Morrison Formation in North America. Troodontidae continued to diversify and can be found in Asia, Europe and North America. They were most probably dispersed from Asia to other continents on land.

Around the same time, Avialae began to obtain the ability to fly. This may contribute to the rapid diversification and dispersal of avialans in later stages.

=== Cretaceous ===
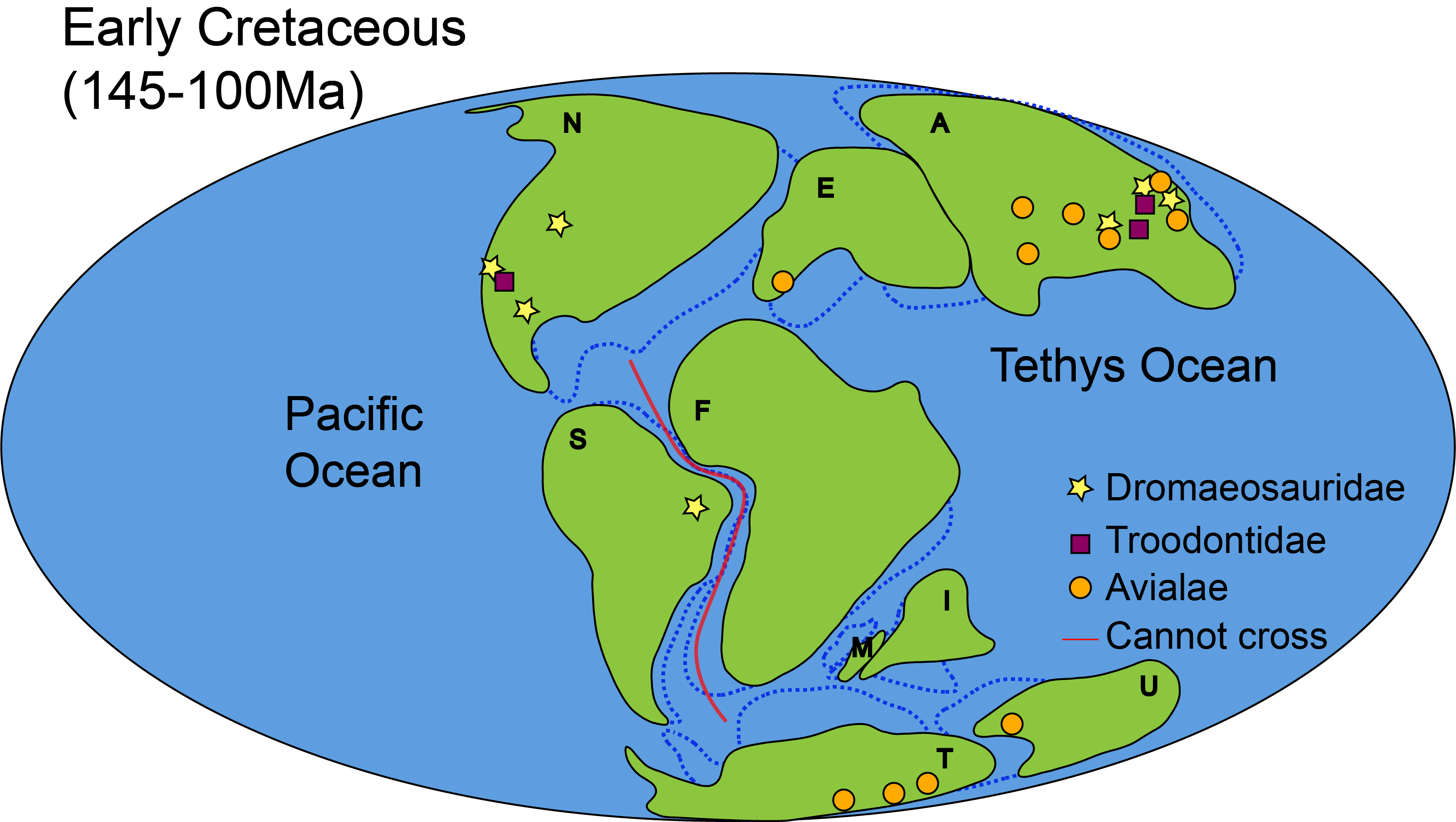
Fig. 6. A map showing the distribution of Paraves in Early Cretaceous. The red line indicates the separation of South America and Africa. The dotted lines indicate the position of the continents at the end of Jurassic. Abbreviations: N, North America; S, South America; A, Asia; E, Europe; F, Africa; T, Antarctica; U, Australia; I, India; M, Madagascar. Modified from Ding et al. (2019).

In Early Cretaceous (145–100 million years ago), the opening of the South Atlantic Ocean commenced and South America became fully detached from Africa at approximately 100 Ma. Despite the fragmentation of land, terrestrial animals can still cross from continent to continent, facilitated by the land bridges and shallow seas.

Table 2. Distribution of each clade in Early Cretaceous
Continent	Dromaeosauridae	Troodontidae	Avialae
Asia	✓	✓	✓
Europe			✓
Africa	✓		
North America	✓	✓	
South America			✓
Antarctica			
Australia			✓

Apart from Troodontidae, Dromaeosauridae and Avialae began spreading to other continents. Dromaeosauridae dispersed to Asia and Africa, likely made possible by the Apulian Route connecting Eurasia and Africa, and the Bering Land Bridge linking North America and Asia. The Apulian Route was established in early Late Jurassic and broke off towards the end of Jurassic. At this stage, paravian distribution concentrated mostly on the northern hemisphere, with exceptions of avialae found in South America and Australia.

The iconic Jehol Biota found in Yixian Formation and Jiufotang Formation in Inner Mongolia yielded fossils of early avialans including enantiornithes (a subclass of birds) and small dromaeosaurids (i.e. microraptorians). During the paravians' rapid diversification, some of the better-known dinosaurs came into existence, including the troodontid Mei.

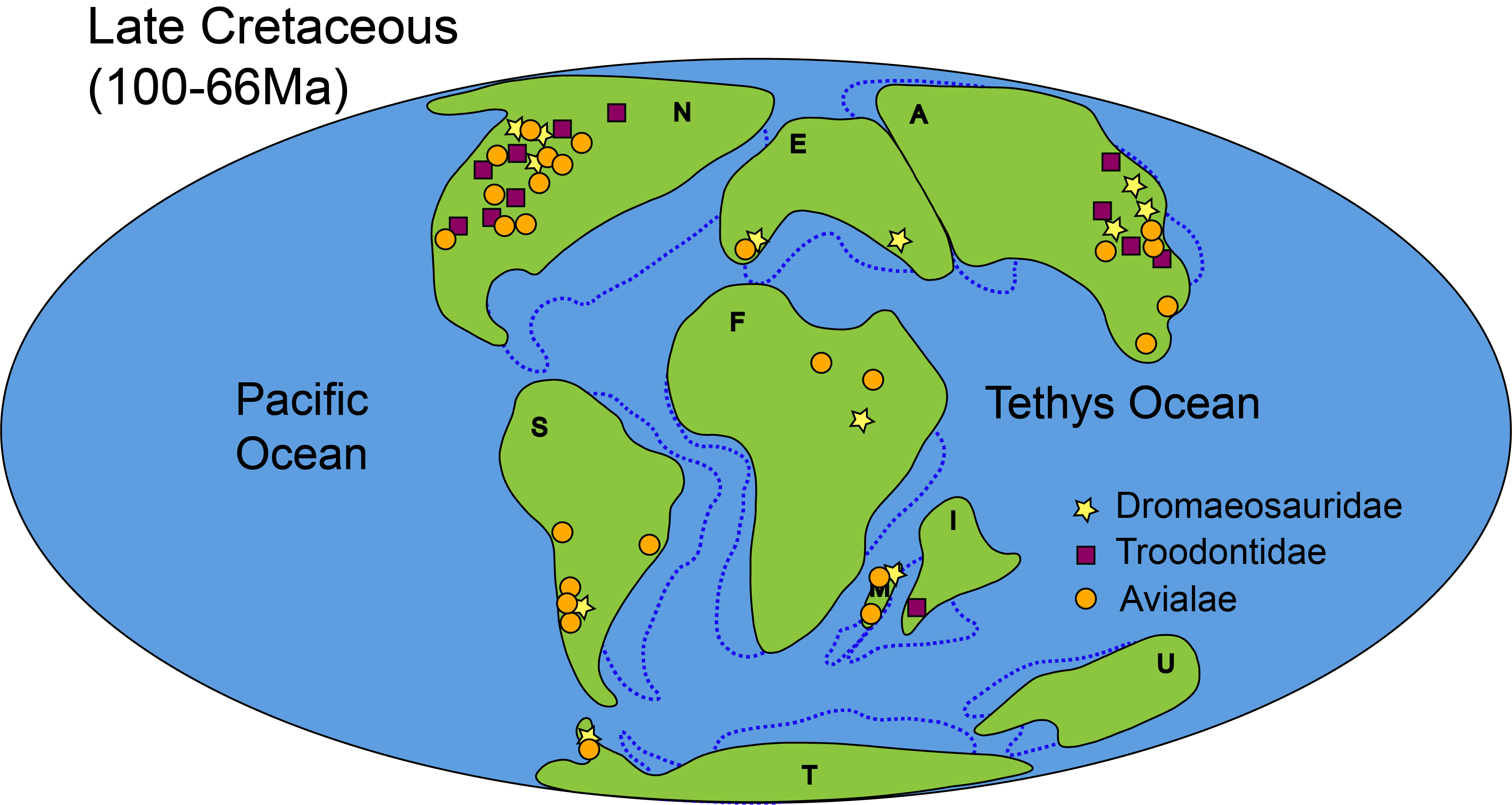
Fig. 7. A map showing the distribution of Paraves in Late Cretaceous. The dotted lines indicate the position of the continents at the end of Early Cretaceous. Abbreviations: N, North America; S, South America; A, Asia; E, Europe; F, Africa; T, Antarctica; U, Australia; I, India; M, Madagascar. Modified from Ding et al. (2019).

Table 3. Distribution of each clade in Late Cretaceous
Continent	Dromaeosauridae	Troodontidae	Avialae
Asia	✓	✓	✓
Europe	✓		✓
Africa	✓		✓
North America	✓	✓	✓
South America	✓		✓
Antarctica	✓		✓
Australia			

In Late Cretaceous (100–66 million years ago), both Dromaeosauridae and Avialae had reached global distribution, while Troodontidae remained found only in Asia (including India) and North America. There were many more avialan records in Antarctica and Australia in Early Cretaceous compared to that of Late Cretaceous.

Paleontologists also deduced a slight change in diet in avialans during Cretaceous. While most Paraves in Late Jurassic were carnivorous (meat-eater), some avialans were found to be seed-eating in this period. This change in diet and the sudden avian diversification coincided with the spread of angiosperms (flowering plants), implying that there may have been coevolution taking place where the avialans and the flowering plants impact each other's evolution.

=== End-Cretaceous mass extinction ===
The Cretaceous-Paleogene mass extinction (~66 million years ago) is one of the most-studied extinction events. While not being the largest known mass extinction event, it is famous for its impact on dinosaurs. Like all other dinosaurian species, almost all Paraves died out sometime between the latest Cretaceous (Maastrichtian) and the start of Paleogene – with one exception. Given the title "the most successful dinosaurs" by paleontologists, neornithines managed to survive the mass extinction and continued to flourish in present days.

The reason as to why only neornithines lived was still a very much debated topic among vertebrate paleontologists. Some believed that it was related to their global distribution and the cause of mass extinction. The fossil record of late Cretaceous neornithines concentrated in the southern hemisphere where Gondwana once was. It is then hypothesised that life in the southern hemisphere suffered less because the impact of the meteor at Chicxulub was northward-facing.

Another hypothesis suggested that the extinction of non-neornithines was unlikely a result of mass extinction but was instead caused by a change in vegetation pattern. It is found that a portion of non-neornithines was already extinct before the impact event. This can be accounted for by the regional scale vegetation loss that occurred in North America, which largely affected the atmospheric composition and disrupted the food chain.

Both hypotheses, along with any other possibilities, have yet to be proven with definitive evidence. One certain thing is that neornithines did not diversify much in Cretaceous compared to that in the early Cenozoic, unlike other groups of birds. The fossil record for neornithines in Late Cretaceous was sparse, but there was an explosive increase in fossils in Early Cenozoic. As the radiation of neornithines happened together with the rise of mammals, it seems logical that the two events were related.

=== Paleogene-present ===
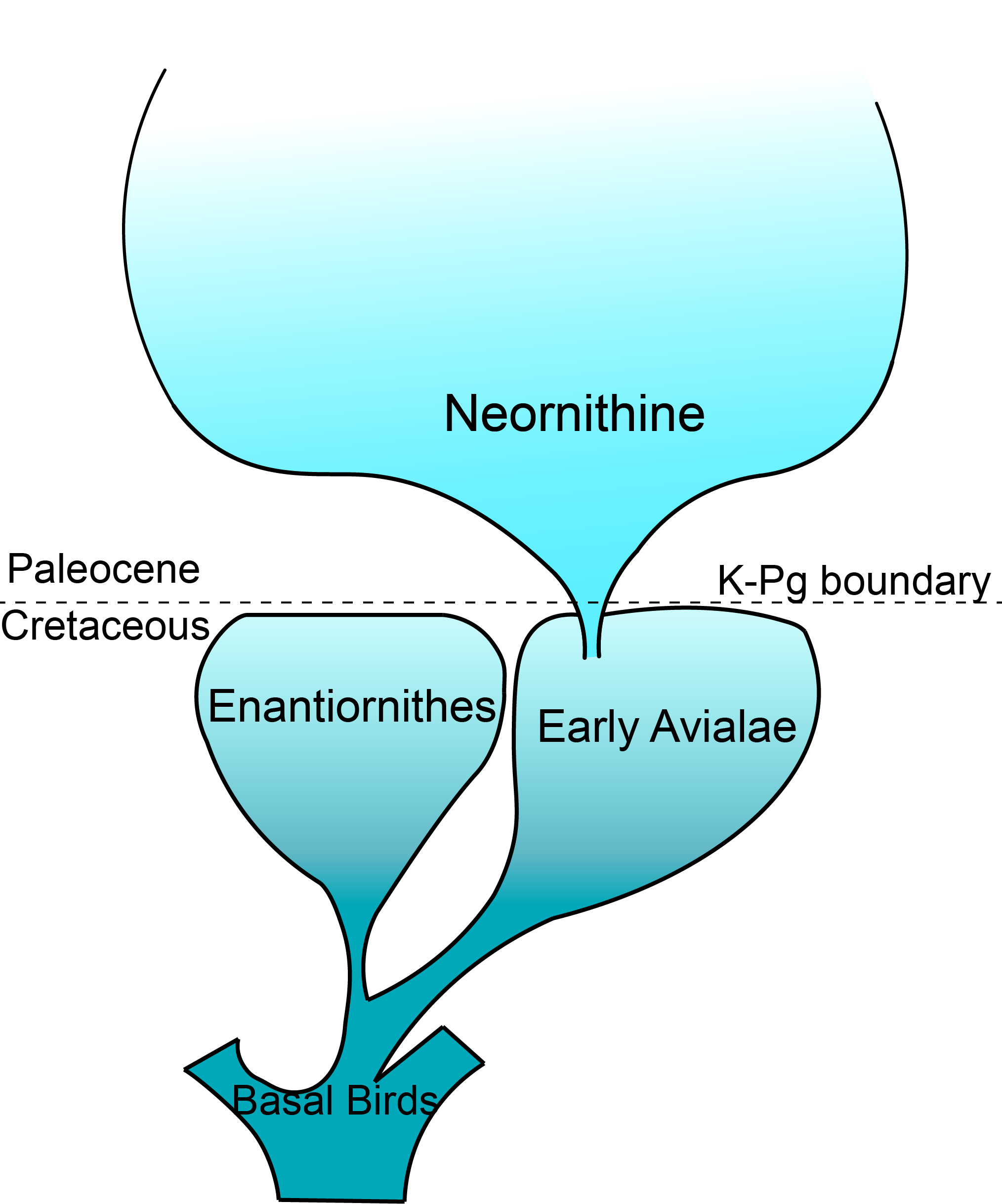
Fig. 8. A diagram showing the diversification of avialans before and after the K-Pg mass extinction event. The size roughly represents the number of species in that group. Basal birds diversified into different groups in the Cretaceous, while neornithines only began their rapid diversification in Paleocene. Modified from Feduccia (2014).

As the Earth entered a new era, the continents started to move into their modern positions. Australia and South America finally separated from Antarctica while the Indian subplate began its collision into Asia, creating the world's largest mountain range the Himalayas. At the same time, the global average temperature cooled down since Late Cretaceous with a Thermal Maximum at Paleocene-Eocene boundary and Middle Miocene Climatic Optimum. Between these warm episodes were periods of cooling (Oligocene global cooling), where seawater level fell and land bridges between Africa and Eurasia (i.e. Gomphotherium landbridge), and Eurasia and North America (i.e. Bering Land Bridge) were formed.

Vegetation patterns underwent drastic changes in Cenozoic. With long periods of global warming, grasslands spread to regions of higher latitudes. This phenomenon facilitated the dispersal of avialans that lived in non-arboreal environments, examples found in Green River Formation (USA) and Messel Oil Shale (Germany). Neornithines underwent a rapid increase in number in Paleogene in a relatively short time, though crown group birds were still sparse.

Since the continents were almost entirely separated from each other, neornithines began to speciate independently. Most of the mutations occurred in birds without long-distance flight abilities, and the most prominent changes were found in birds living on isolated islands like New Zealand and Australia. It is hypothesised that due to the lack of large carnivorous (meat-eating) predators on these islands due to the extinction of dinosaurs, birds were able to evolve and adapt to the new environments. Such mutations include an increase in body sizes but reduced wings and development of flightlessness, as found in birds like moas (completely extinct by the year 1440), kiwis and ostriches. Though they were not closely related to one another, this evolution pattern indicates that birds evolve similarly in isolated environments without major threats of predators.

=== Summary of paleobiogeography ===
Table 4. Summary
Continent	Middle Jurassic (170-166Ma)			Late Jurassic (166-145Ma)			Early Cretaceous (145-100Ma)			Late Cretaceous (100-66Ma)			Post K-Pg Mass Extinction (66Ma-present)		
Continent	D	T	A	D	T	A	D	T	A	D	T	A	D	T	A
Asia		⧠			⧠		★	⧠	⚫︎	★	⧠	⚫︎			⚫︎
Europe					⧠	⚫︎			⚫︎	★		⚫︎			⚫︎
Africa							★			★		⚫︎			⚫︎
North America				★	⧠		★	⧠		★	⧠	⚫︎			⚫︎
South America									⚫︎	★		⚫︎			⚫︎
Antarctica										★		⚫︎			⚫︎
Australia									⚫︎						⚫︎

D – Dromaeosauridae (★)

T – Troodontidae (⧠)

A – Avialae (⚫︎)

Table 5. Distribution of Dromaeosauridae through time
Continent	Middle Jurassic	Late Jurassic	Early Cretaceous	Late Cretaceous	Post K-Pg Mass Extinction
Asia			✓	✓	
Europe				✓	
Africa			✓	✓	
North America		✓	✓	✓	
South America				✓	
Antarctica				✓	
Australia					

Table 6. Distribution of Troodontidae through time
Continent	Middle Jurassic	Late Jurassic	Early Cretaceous	Late Cretaceous	Post K-Pg Mass Extinction
Asia	✓	✓	✓	✓	
Europe		✓			
Africa					
North America		✓	✓	✓	
South America					
Antarctica					
Australia					

Table 7. Distribution of Avialae through time
Continent	Middle Jurassic	Late Jurassic	Early Cretaceous	Late Cretaceous	Post K-Pg Mass Extinction
Asia			✓	✓	✓
Europe		✓	✓	✓	✓
Africa				✓	✓
North America				✓	✓
South America			✓	✓	✓
Antarctica				✓	✓
Australia			✓		✓

== Limitations ==
=== Flight capabilities ===
There are some limitations in studying the biogeography of Paraves, including their development of flight. Flight capabilities in Paraves were developed since the Late Jurassic. While only several groups of paravian dinosaurs have such abilities, it is certainly a possibility that it contributed to their dispersal in late Mesozoic. In these cases, the biogeographic record of Paraves cannot be interpreted solely by whether the land was connected or not. Modern migratory birds can travel covering long distances without relying much on land. This means that the development of long-distance flight occurred at some point between the first appearance of bird-like dinosaurs and present day. It is found that, at least until Early Cretaceous, Paraves can only glide between trees instead of flying like modern birds. Thus, their flight abilities do not affect the dispersal of Paraves. In Cenozoic, avian flight abilities were more or less developed in neornithines, though there are exceptions that are flightless birds mainly found in isolated islands. Since then, flight in avians had become a major factor contributing to the dispersal of birds.

=== Taphonomic bias ===
Taphonomic bias is caused by the difference in how organisms decay and fossilise. It is another challenge faced by paleontologists as the fossil records are often incomplete. Moreover, some localities have better-preserved record due to their geological history than the others, leading to misinterpretations in biogeography. This is especially true for dinosaurian fossil records since localities in North America and China had a much higher abundance of fossils preserved in sedimentary rocks. In fact, there is only one known rock formation that holds a relatively complete and dated record of the latest Cretaceous (Maastrichtian), named the Hell Creek Formation in western North America. The fossils for birds (including basal avialans) in Late Cretaceous are incomplete as well, given the sparse record discovered in Australia and Antarctica.

Other possible types of taphonomic bias include collecting bias. Fossils of species that lived in a specific environment can also be poorly preserved. An example being fossils of arboreal neornithines (birds that live in trees) are rarely found in the late Mesozoic and earliest Paleocene. This may lead to the conclusion that they did not diversify in that period due to underrepresentation, which may or may not be true.

== See also ==
- Biogeography
- Paraves
- Pangea
- Geobiology
- Macroecology
- Vertebrate Paleontology
