= Biological dispersal =

Movement of individuals from their birth site to a breeding site

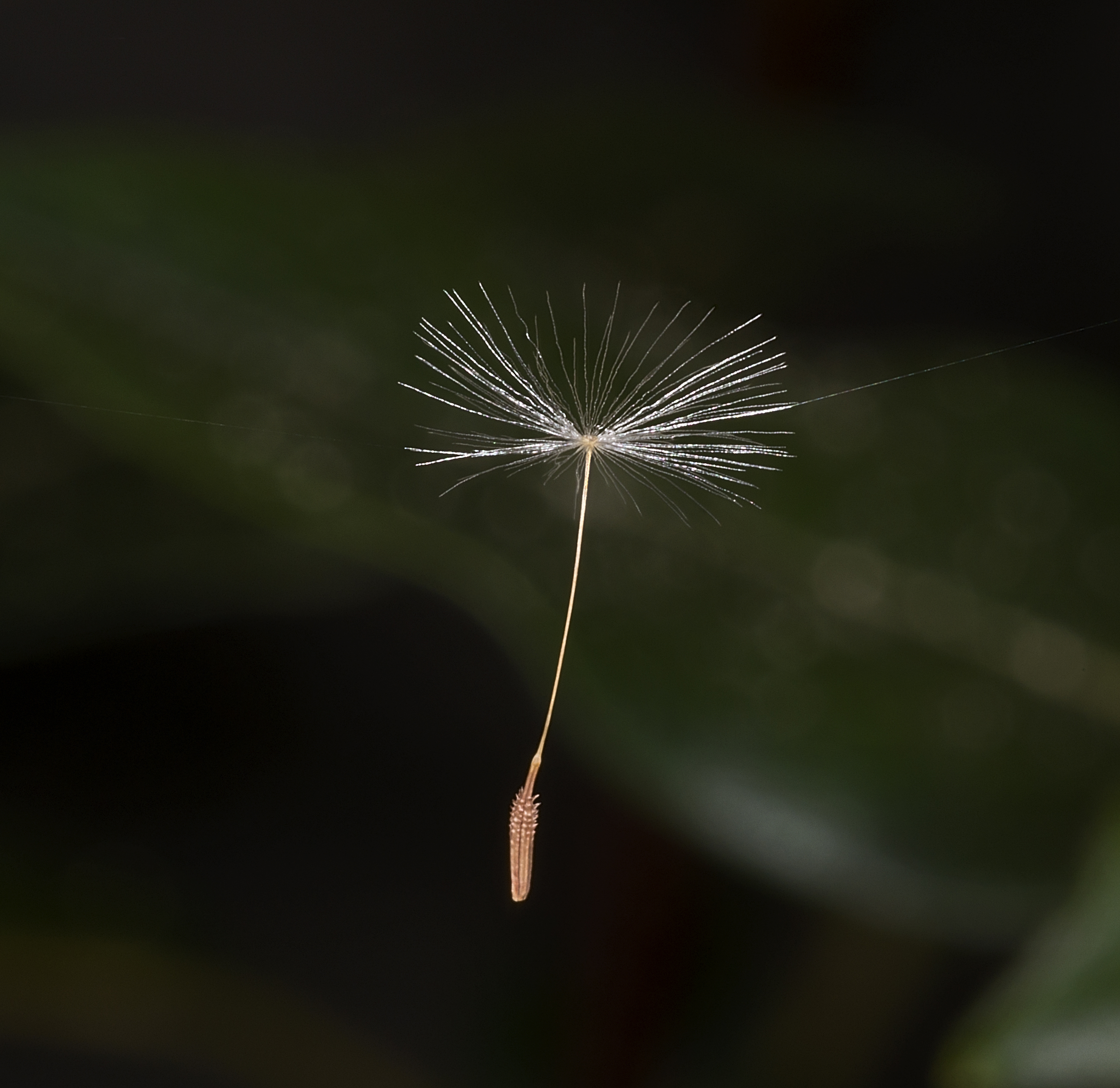
A dandelion seed caught in a spider web strand. Dandelions disperse seeds via wind currents.

Dispersal of lichen soredia (visualized using ultraviolet light) by a spider

Biological dispersal refers to both the movement of individuals (animals, plants, fungi, bacteria, etc.) from their birth site to their breeding site ('natal dispersal') and the movement from one breeding site to another ('breeding dispersal'). The term also encompasses the movement of propagules such as seeds and spores. Technically, dispersal is defined as any movement that has the potential to lead to gene flow. The act of dispersal involves three phases: departure, transfer, and settlement. Each phase is associated with distinct fitness costs and benefits. By simply moving from one habitat patch to another, an individual's dispersal can influence not only its own fitness but also broader processes such as population dynamics, population genetics, and species distribution. Understanding dispersal and its consequences, both for evolutionary strategies at a species level and for processes at an ecosystem level, requires understanding on the type of dispersal, the dispersal range of a given species, and the dispersal mechanisms involved. Biological dispersal can be correlated to population density. The range of variations of a species' location determines the expansion range.

Biological dispersal may be contrasted with geodispersal, which refers to the mixing of previously isolated populations (or entire biotas) following the erosion of geographic barriers to dispersal or gene flow.

Dispersal can be distinguished from animal migration (typically round-trip seasonal movement), although within population genetics, the terms 'migration' and 'dispersal' are often used interchangeably.

Furthermore, biological dispersal is impacted and limited by different environmental and individual conditions. This leads to a wide range of consequences on the organisms present in the environment and their ability to adapt their dispersal methods to that environment.

== Types of dispersal ==
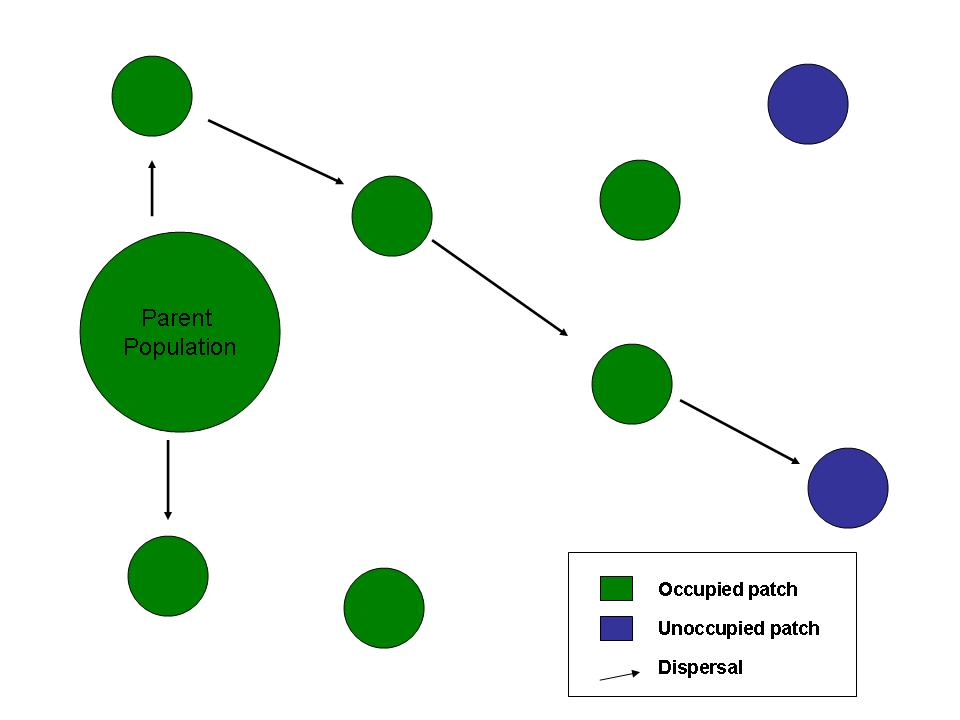
Dispersal from parent population

Some organisms are motile throughout their lives, while others are adapted to move—or be moved—only during specific, limited phases of their life cycles. This stage is commonly referred to as the dispersive phase. The strategies underlying an organism's full life cycle are often shaped by the nature and conditions of this dispersive phase.

In general, there are two basic types:

Passive Dispersal (Density-Independent Dispersal)
In passive dispersal, organisms cannot move on their own but use other methods to achieve successful reproduction or facilitation into new habitats. Organisms have evolved adaptations for dispersal that take advantage of various forms of kinetic energy occurring naturally in the environment. This can be done by taking advantage of water, wind, or an animal that is able to perform active dispersal itself. Some organisms are capable of movement while in their larval phase. This is common amongst some invertebrates, fish, insects and sessile organisms such as plants) that depend on animal vectors, wind, gravity or currents for dispersal.
Some invertebrates, such as sea sponges and corals, release their gametes into the water. In this way, they can successfully reproduce: sperm move actively through the water, while eggs are carried by currents. Plants use similar strategies, relying on water currents, wind, or animals to transport their gametes. Seeds, spores, and fruits often possess specific adaptations that facilitate their movement.
Active Dispersal (Density-Dependent Dispersal)
In active dispersal, an organism moves between locations using its own inherent capabilities. Age is not a restriction, as changes in location are common in both young and adult animals. The extent of dispersion depends on multiple factors, such as local population, resource competition, habitat quality, and habitat size. Due to this, many consider active dispersal to also be density-dependent, as the density of the community plays a major role in the movement of animals. However, the effect is observed differently across age groups, which results in diverse levels of dispersion.
When it comes to active dispersal, animals that are capable of free movement over large distances are ideal, typically moving through flying, swimming, or walking. Nonetheless, there are restrictions imposed by geographical location and habitat. Walking animals are at the biggest disadvantage when it comes to this, as they can be prone to being stopped by potential barriers. Although some terrestrial animals traveling by foot can travel great distances, walking uses more energy compared to flying or swimming, especially when passing through adverse conditions.

Due to population density, dispersal may relieve pressure on resources in an ecosystem, and competition for these resources may be a selection factor for dispersal mechanisms. Dispersal of organisms is a critical process for understanding both geographic isolation in evolution through gene flow and the broad patterns of current geographic distributions (biogeography).

A distinction is often made between natal dispersal, where an individual (often a juvenile) moves away from the place it was born, and breeding dispersal, where an individual (often an adult) moves away from one breeding location to breed elsewhere.

== Costs and benefits ==
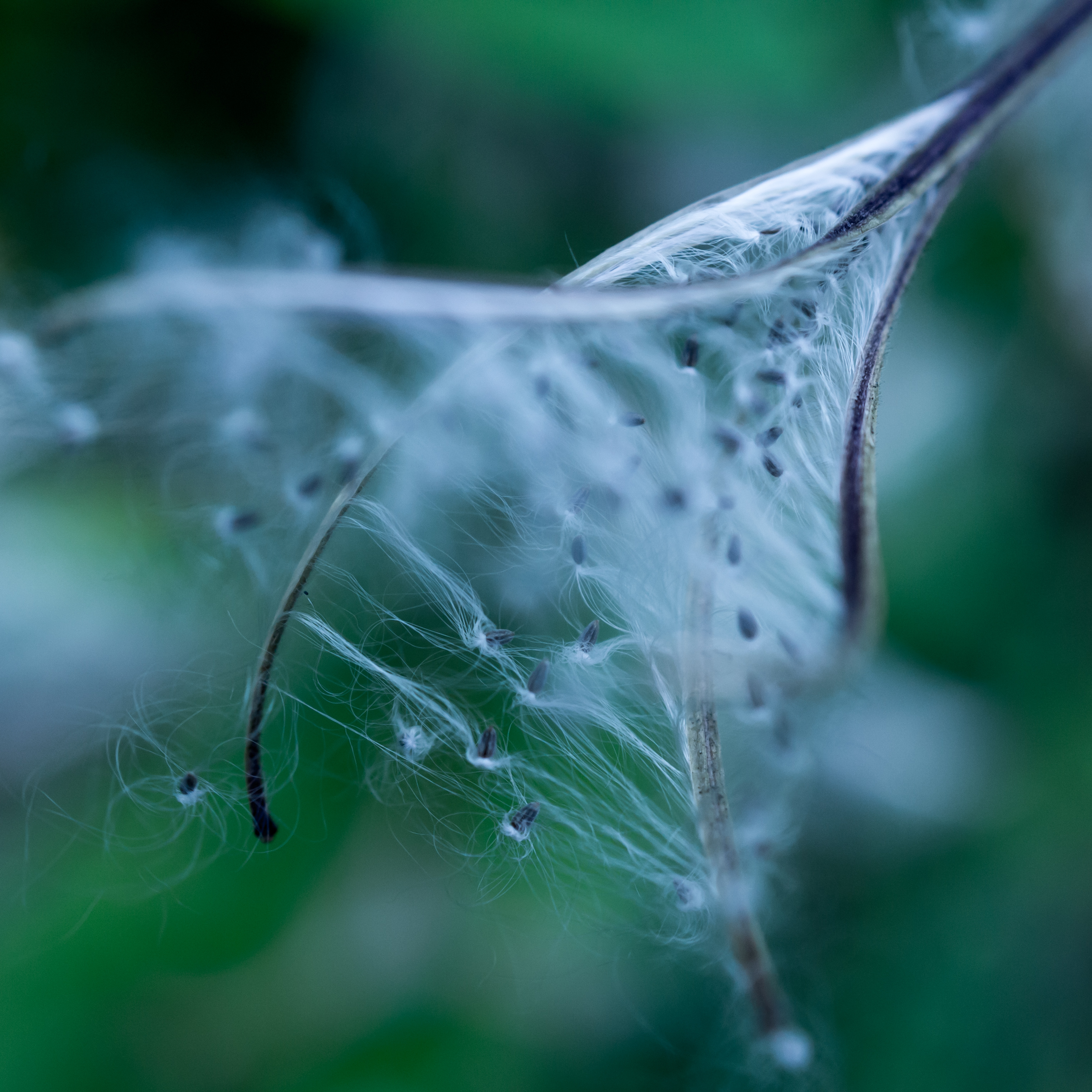
Epilobium hirsutum — Seed head

In the broadest sense, dispersal occurs when the fitness benefits of movement outweigh its costs.

There are a number of benefits to dispersal, such as locating new resources, escaping unfavorable conditions, avoiding competition with siblings, and avoiding breeding with closely related individuals, which could lead to inbreeding depression.

There are also a number of costs associated with dispersal, which can be thought of in terms of four main currencies: energy, risk, time, and opportunity. Energetic costs include the extra energy required for movement as well as energetic investment in movement machinery (e.g. wings). Risks include increased injury and mortality during dispersal and the possibility of settling in an unfavorable environment. Time spent dispersing is time that often cannot be spent on other activities, such as growth and reproduction. Finally, dispersal can also lead to outbreeding depression if an individual is better adapted to its natal environment than the one it ends up in. In social animals (such as many birds and mammals) a dispersing individual must find and join a new group, which can lead to a loss of social rank.

== Dispersal range ==
"Dispersal range" refers to the distance a species can move from an existing population or its parent organism. An ecosystem depends critically on the ability of individuals and populations to disperse from one habitat patch to another. Therefore, biological dispersal is critical for the stability of ecosystems.

=== Urban Environments and Dispersal Range ===
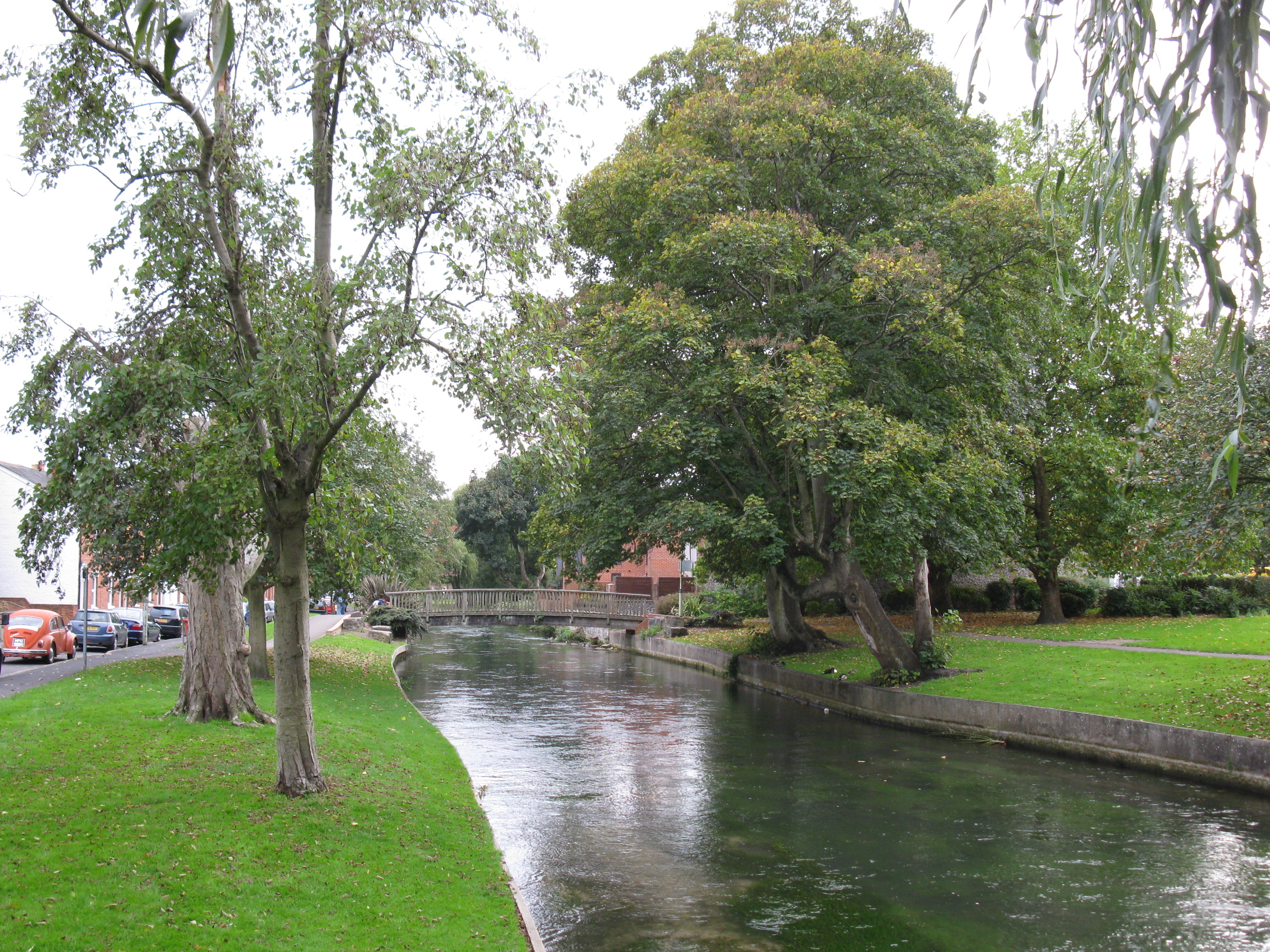
Image showing rivers as dispersal vectors

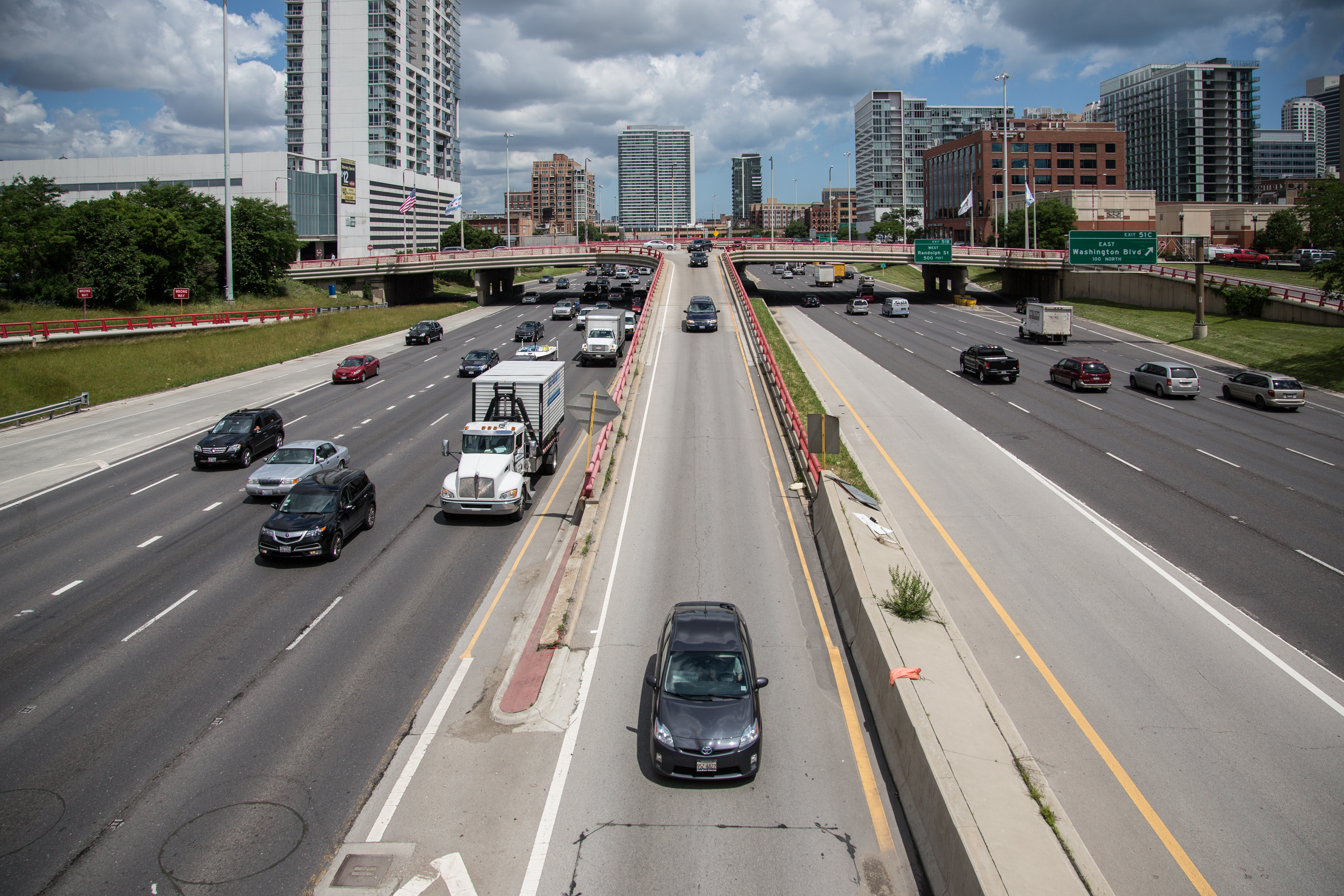
Image depicts how development in urban areas can limit dispersal.

Urban areas can be seen to have their own unique effects on the dispersal range and dispersal abilities of different organisms. For plant species, urban environments largely provide novel dispersal vectors. While animals and physical factors (i.e. wind, water, etc.) have played a role in dispersal for centuries, motor vehicles have recently been considered major dispersal vectors. Tunnels that connect rural and urban environments have been shown to expedite a large number and diverse set of seeds from urban to rural environments. This could lead to potential sources of invasive species on the urban-rural gradient. Another example of the effects of urbanization can be seen next to rivers. Urbanization has led to the introduction of different invasive species through direct planting or wind dispersal. In turn, rivers next to these invasive plant species have become vital dispersal vectors. Rivers could be seen to connect urban centers to rural and natural environments. Seeds from the invasive species have been shown to be transported by the rivers to natural areas located downstream, thus building upon the already established dispersal distance of the plant.

In contrast, urban environments can also provide limitations for certain dispersal strategies. Human influence through urbanization greatly affects the layout of landscapes, which can leads to the limitation of dispersal strategies for many organisms. These changes have largely been exhibited through pollinator-flowering plant relationships. As the pollinator's optimal range of survival is limited, it results in a limited supply of pollination sites. Subsequently, this leads to less gene flow between distantly separated populations, thereby decreasing the genetic diversity of each area. Likewise, urbanization has been shown to impact the gene flow of distinctly different species (ex. mice and bats) in similar ways. While these two species may have different ecological niches and living strategies, urbanization limits the dispersal strategies of both populations. This leads to genetic isolation between the populations, resulting in limited gene flow. While urbanization did have a greater effect on mouse dispersal, it also led to a slight increase in inbreeding among bat populations.

=== Environmental constraints ===
Few species are ever evenly or randomly distributed within or across landscapes. In general, species significantly vary across the landscape in association with environmental features that influence their reproductive success and population persistence. Spatial patterns in environmental features (e.g. resources) permit individuals to escape unfavorable conditions and seek out new locations. This allows the organism to "test" new environments for their suitability, provided they are within an animal's geographic range. In addition, the ability of a species to disperse over a gradually changing environment could enable a population to survive extreme conditions. (i.e. climate change).

As the climate changes, prey and predators have to adapt to survive. This poses a problem for many animals, for example, the Southern Rockhopper Penguins. These penguins are able to live and thrive in a variety of climates due to their phenotypic plasticity. However, they are predicted to respond by dispersal, not adaptation in this case. This is explained by their long life spans and slow microevolution. Penguins in the subantarctic have very different foraging behavior from those of subtropical waters; it would be very hard to survive by keeping up with the fast-changing climate because these behaviors took years to shape.

=== Dispersal barriers ===
A dispersal barrier may result in a dispersal range of a species much smaller than the species' distribution. An artificial example is habitat fragmentation due to human land use. By contrast, natural barriers to dispersal that limit species distribution include mountain ranges and rivers. An example is the separation of the ranges of the two species of chimpanzee by the Congo River.

On the other hand, human activities may also expand the dispersal range of a species by providing new dispersal methods (e.g., ballast water from ships). Many such dispersed species become invasive, like rats or stinkbugs, but some species also have a mildly positive impact on human settlers like honeybees and earthworms.

== Dispersal mechanisms ==
Most animals are capable of locomotion and the basic mechanism of dispersal is movement from one place to another. Locomotion allows the organism to "test" new environments for their suitability, provided they are within its range. Movements are usually guided by inherited behaviors.

The formation of barriers to dispersal or gene flow between adjacent areas can isolate populations on either side of the emerging divide. Geographic separation and subsequent genetic isolation of portions of an ancestral population can result in allopatric speciation.

=== Plant dispersal mechanisms ===
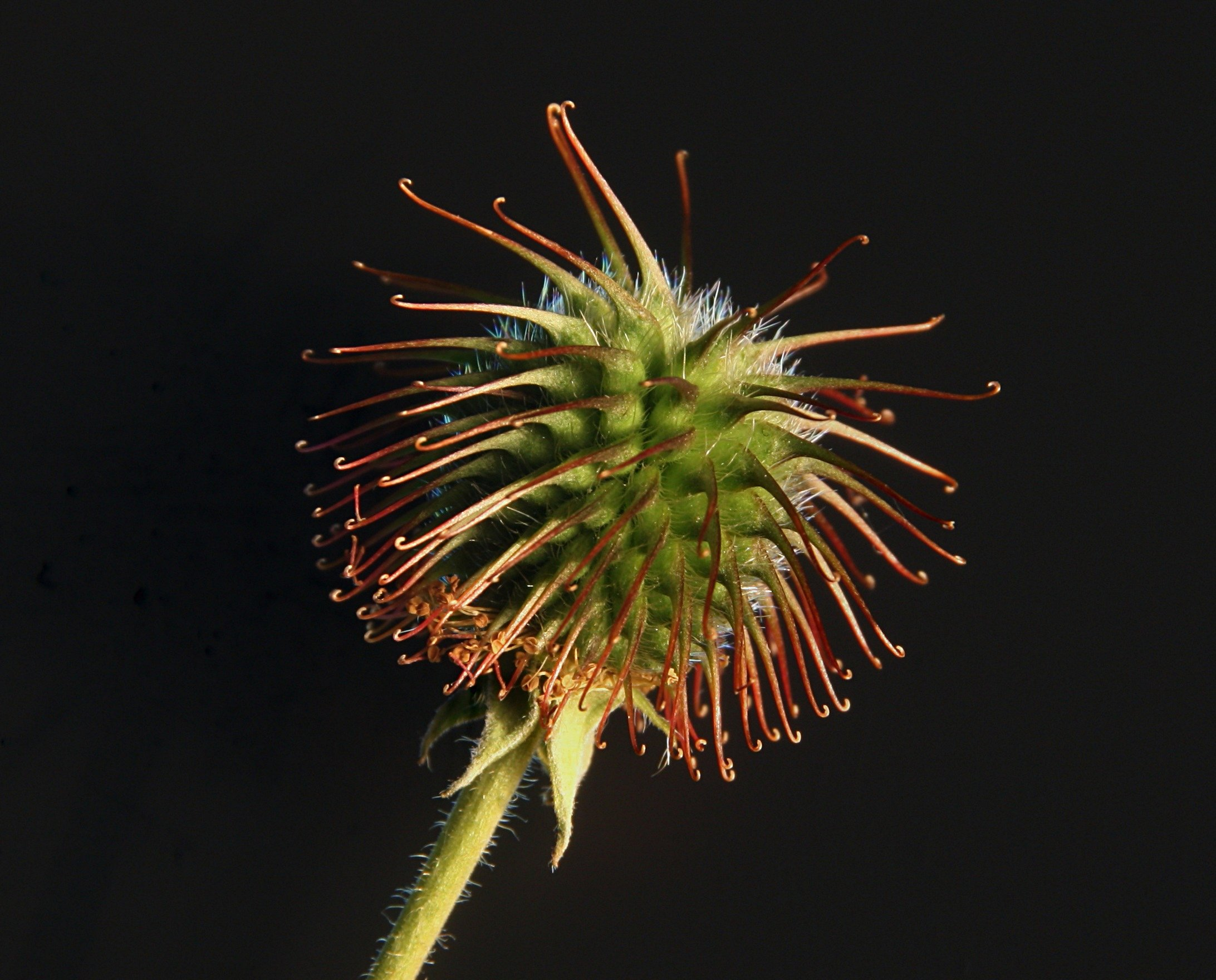
Burs are an example of a seed dispersion mechanism that uses a biotic vector, in this case animals with fur.

Seed dispersal is the movement or transport of seeds away from the parent plant. Plants are limited by vegetative reproduction and consequently rely upon a variety of dispersal vectors to transport their propagules, including both abiotic and biotic vectors. Seeds can be dispersed away from the parent plant individually or collectively, as well as dispersed in both space and time. The patterns of seed dispersal are determined in large part by the specific dispersal mechanism, and this has important implications for the demographic and genetic structure of plant populations, as well as their migration patterns and species interactions. There are five main modes of seed dispersal: gravity, wind, ballistic, water, and animals.

=== Animal dispersal mechanisms ===
==== Non-motile animals ====
There are numerous animal forms that are non-motile, such as sponges, bryozoans, tunicates, sea anemones, corals, and oysters. What they share in common is that they are all either marine or aquatic. It may seem curious that plants have been so successful at stationary life on land, while animals have not, but the answer lies in the food supply. Plants produce their own food from sunlight and carbon dioxide—both generally more abundant on land than in water. Animals fixed in place must rely on the surrounding medium to bring food at least close enough to grab, and this occurs in the three-dimensional water environment, but with much less abundance in the atmosphere.

All of the marine and aquatic invertebrates whose lives are spent fixed to the bottom (more or less; anemones are capable of getting up and moving to a new location if conditions warrant) produce dispersal units. These may be specialized "buds", or motile sexual reproduction products, or even a sort of alteration of generations as in certain cnidaria.

Corals provide a good example of how sedentary species achieve dispersion. Broadcast spawning corals reproduce by releasing sperm and eggs directly into the water. These release events are coordinated by the lunar phase in certain warm months, such that all corals of one or many species on a given reef release gametes on the same single or several consecutive nights. The released eggs are fertilized, and the resulting zygote develops quickly into a multicellular planula. This motile stage then attempts to find a suitable substratum for settlement. Most are unsuccessful and die or are fed upon by zooplankton and bottom-dwelling predators such as anemones and other corals. However, untold millions are produced, and a few do succeed in locating spots of bare limestone, where they settle and transform by growth into a polyp. All things being favorable, the single polyp grows into a coral head by budding off new polyps to form a colony.

==== Motile animals ====
The majority of animals are motile. Motile animals can disperse themselves by their spontaneous and independent locomotive powers. For example, dispersal distances across bird species depend on their flight capabilities. On the other hand, small animals utilize the existing kinetic energies in the environment, resulting in passive movement. Dispersal by water currents is especially associated with the physically small inhabitants of marine waters known as zooplankton. The term plankton comes from the Greek, πλαγκτόν, meaning "wanderer" or "drifter".

==== Dispersal by dormant stages ====
Many animal species, especially freshwater invertebrates, are able to disperse by wind or by transfer with the aid of larger animals (birds, mammals or fishes) as dormant eggs, dormant embryos or, in some cases, dormant adult stages. Tardigrades, some rotifers and some copepods are able to withstand desiccation as adult dormant stages. Many other taxa (Cladocera, Bryozoa, Hydra, Copepoda and so on) can disperse as dormant eggs or embryos. Freshwater sponges usually have special dormant propagules called gemmulae for such a dispersal. Many kinds of dispersal dormant stages are able to withstand not only desiccation and low and high temperatures, but also the action of digestive enzymes during their transfer through digestive tracts of birds and other animals, high concentration of salts, and many kinds of toxicants. Such dormant-resistant stages have made possible the long-distance dispersal from one water body to another and broad distribution ranges of many freshwater animals.

== Quantifying dispersal ==
Dispersal is most commonly quantified either in terms of rate or distance.

Dispersal rate (also called migration rate in the population genetics literature) or probability describes the probability that any individual leaves an area or, equivalently, the expected proportion of individuals who leave an area.

The dispersal distance is usually described by a dispersal kernel which gives the probability distribution of the distance traveled by any individual. A number of different functions are used for dispersal kernels in theoretical models of dispersal including the negative exponential distribution, extended negative exponential distribution, normal distribution, exponential power distribution, inverse power distribution, and the two-sided power distribution. The inverse power distribution and distributions with 'fat tails,' representing long-distance dispersal events (called leptokurtic distributions) are thought to best match empirical dispersal data.

== Consequences of dispersal ==
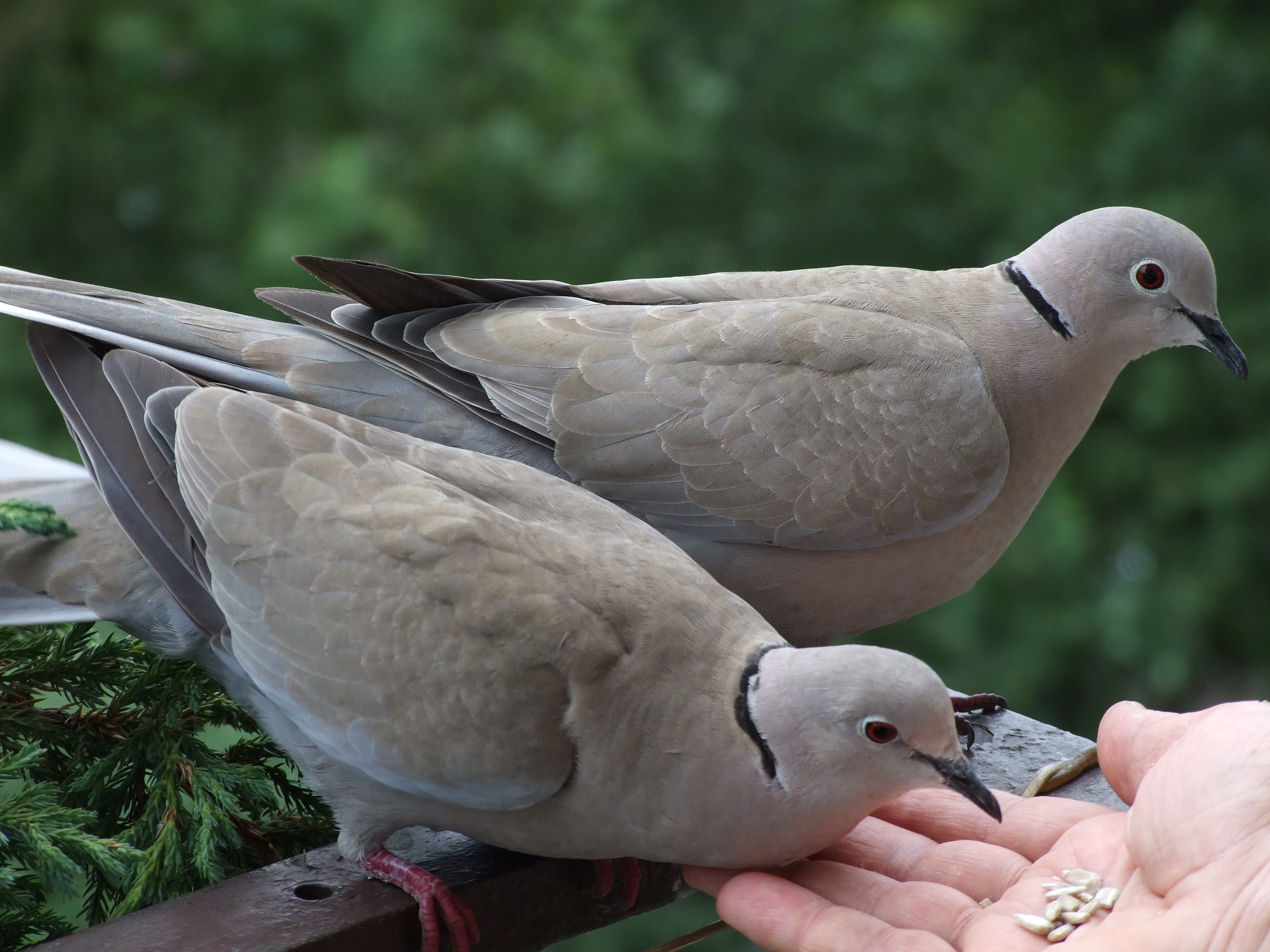
Originally restricted to Central and South Asia, the Eurasian collared dove (Streptopelia decaocto) has successfully colonised much of Eurasia through dispersal and establishment of new populations outside its original range.

Dispersal not only has costs and benefits to the dispersing individual (as mentioned above), it also has consequences at the level of the population and species on both ecological and evolutionary timescales. Organisms can be dispersed through multiple methods. Transport by animals is especially effective, as it allows travel over far distances. Many plants depend on this to be able to go to new locations, preferably with conditions ideal for procreation and germination. With this, dispersal has major influence in the determination of population and spread of plant species.

Many populations have patchy spatial distributions where separate yet interacting sub-populations occupy discrete habitat patches (see metapopulations). Dispersing individuals move between different sub-populations, which increases the overall connectivity of the metapopulation and can lower the risk of stochastic extinction. If a sub-population goes extinct by chance, it is more likely to be recolonized if the dispersal rate is high. Increased connectivity can also decrease the degree of local adaptation.

Human interference with the environment has been seen to have an effect on dispersal. Some of these occurrences have been accidents, like in the case of zebra mussels, which are indigenous to Southeast Russia. A ship had accidentally released them into the North American Great Lakes and they became a major nuisance in the area, as they began to clog water treatment and power plants. Another case of this was seen in Chinese bighead and silver carp, which were brought in with the purpose of algae control in many catfish ponds across the U.S. Unfortunately, some had managed to escape into the neighboring rivers of Mississippi, Missouri, Illinois, and Ohio, eventually causing a negative impact for the surrounding ecosystems. However, human-created habitats such as urban environments have allowed certain migrated species to become urbanophiles or synanthropes.

Dispersal has led to genetic changes in many species. A positive correlation between dispersal and both genetic differentiation and diversification has been observed in certain spider species in the Canary Islands. These spiders inhabit various islands and archipelagos, where dispersal has been identified as a key factor influencing the rate of both processes.

== Human-Mediated Dispersal ==
Human impact has had a major influence on the movement of animals through time. An environmental response has occurred as a result of this, as dispersal patterns are important for species to survive major changes. There are two forms of human-mediated dispersal:

Human-Vectored Dispersal (HVD)
In Human-Vectored Dispersal, humans directly move the organism. This can occur deliberately, like for the usage of the animal in an agricultural setting, hunting, or more. However, it can also occur accidentally, if the organism attaches itself to a person or vehicle. For this process, the organism first has to come in contact with a human and then movement can start. This has become more common as the human population all over the world has increased and movement through the world has also become more prevalent. Dispersal through a human can be many times more successful in distance compared to movement by wild or other environmental means.

Human-Altered Dispersal (HAD)
Human-Altered Dispersal signifies the effects that have occurred due to human interference with landscapes and animals. Many of these interferences have caused negative consequences in the environment. For example, many areas have suffered habitat loss, which in turn can have a negative effect on dispersal. Researchers have found that due to this, animals have been reported to move further distances in an attempt to find isolated places.This can especially be seen through construction of roads and other infrastructures in remote areas.

Long-distance dispersals are observed when seeds are carried through human vectors. A study was conducted to test the effects of human-mediated dispersal of seeds over long distances in two species of Brassica in England. The main methods of dispersal compared with movement by wind versus movement by attachment to outerwear. It was concluded that shoes were able to transport seeds to further distances than what would be achievable through wind alone. It was noted that some seeds were able to stay on the shoes for long periods of time, about 8 hours of walking, but evenly came off. Due to this, the seeds were able to travel far distances and settle into new areas, where they were previously not inhabiting. However, it is also important that the seeds land in places where they are able to stick and grow. Specific shoe size did not seem to have an effect on prevalence.

== Dispersal observation methods ==
Biological dispersal can be observed using different methods. To study the effects of dispersal, observers use the methods of landscape genetics. This allows scientists to observe the difference between population variation, climate as well as the size and shape of the landscape. An example of the use of landscape genetics as a means to study seed dispersal, for example, involves studying the effects of traffic using motorway tunnels between inner cities and suburban areas.

Genome-wide SNP datasets and species distribution modelling are examples of computational methods used to examine different dispersal modes. A genome-wide SNP dataset can be used to determine the genomic and demographic history within the range of collection or observation. Species distribution models are used when scientists wish to determine which region is best suited for the species under observation. Methods such as these are used to understand the criteria the environment provides when migration and settlement occurs such as the cases in biological invasion.

Human-aided dispersal, an example of an anthropogenic effect, can contribute to biological dispersal ranges and variations.

Informed dispersal is a way to observe the cues of biological dispersal suggesting the reasoning behind special placement. This concept implies that the movement between species also involve information transfer. Methods such as GPS location are used to monitor the social cues and mobility of species regarding habitat selection. GPS radio-collars can be used when collecting data on social animals such as meerkats. Consensus data such as detailed trip records and point of interest (POI) data can be used to predict the movement of humans from rural to urban areas—an examples of informed dispersal.

Direct tracking or visual tracking allows scientists to monitor the movement of seed dispersal by color coding. Scientists and observers can track the migration of individuals through the landscape. The pattern of transportation can then be visualized to reflect the range in which the organism expands.

== See also ==
- Aeroplankton
- Competition (biology)
- Disturbance (ecology)
- Dormancy ('dispersal in time')
- Gene flow
- Habitat fragmentation
- Island hopping
- Landscape ecology
- Metapopulation
- Oceanic dispersal
- Phoresy
- Population modeling
- Population distribution
- Population ecology
- Species distribution
