= Biogeography =

Study of distribution of species

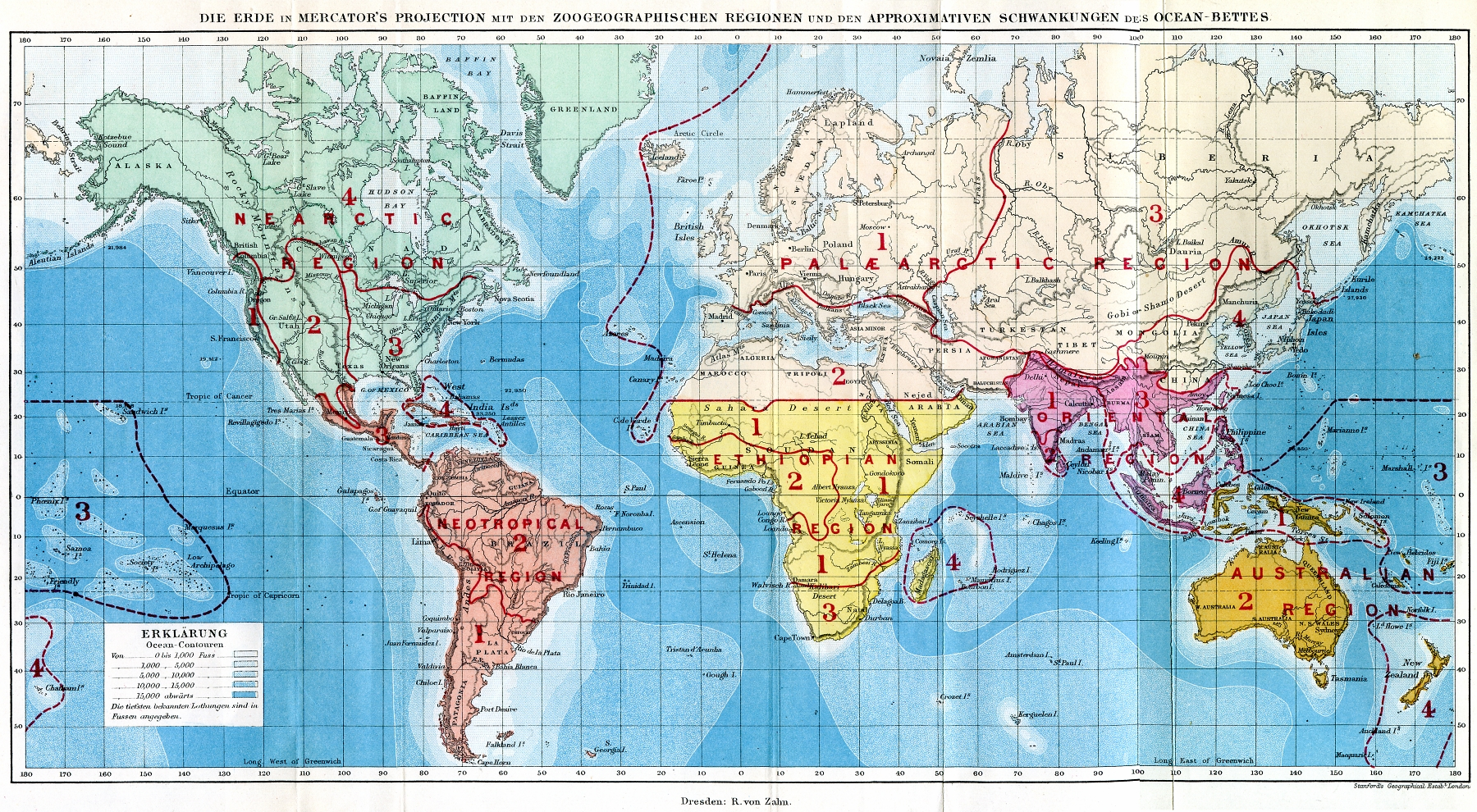
Frontispiece to Alfred Russel Wallace's book The Geographical Distribution of Animals

Biogeography is the study of the distribution of species and ecosystems in geographic space and throughout geological time. Organisms and biological communities often vary in a regular fashion along geographic gradients of latitude, elevation, isolation and habitat area. Phytogeography is the branch of biogeography that studies the distribution of plants, Zoogeography is the branch that studies distribution of animals, while Mycogeography is the branch that studies distribution of fungi, such as mushrooms.

Knowledge of spatial variation in the numbers and types of organisms is as vital to us today as it was to our early human ancestors, as we adapt to heterogeneous but geographically predictable environments. Biogeography is an integrative field of inquiry that unites concepts and information from ecology, evolutionary biology, taxonomy, geology, physical geography, palaeontology, and climatology.

Modern biogeographic research combines information and ideas from many fields, from the physiological and ecological constraints on organismal dispersal to geological and climatological phenomena operating at global spatial scales and evolutionary time frames.

The short-term interactions within a habitat and species of organisms describe the ecological application of biogeography. Historical biogeography describes the long-term, evolutionary periods of time for broader classifications of organisms. Early scientists, beginning with Carl Linnaeus, contributed to the development of biogeography as a science.

The scientific theory of biogeography grows out of the work of Alexander von Humboldt (1769–1859), Francisco Jose de Caldas (1768–1816), Hewett Cottrell Watson (1804–1881), Alphonse de Candolle (1806–1893), Alfred Russel Wallace (1823–1913), Philip Lutley Sclater (1829–1913) and other biologists and explorers.

== Introduction ==
The patterns of species distribution across geographical areas can usually be explained through a combination of historical factors such as: speciation, extinction, continental drift, and glaciation. Through observing the geographic distribution of species, we can see associated variations in sea level, river routes, habitat, and river capture. Additionally, this science considers the geographic constraints of landmass areas and isolation, as well as the available ecosystem energy supplies.

Over periods of ecological changes, biogeography includes the study of plant and animal species in: their past and/or present living refugium habitat; their interim living sites; and/or their survival locales. As David Quammen put it, "...biogeography does more than ask Which species? and Where. It also asks Why? and, what is sometimes more crucial, Why not?."

Modern biogeography often employs the use of Geographic Information Systems (GIS), to understand the factors affecting organism distribution, and to predict future trends in organism distribution. Often mathematical models and GIS are employed to solve ecological problems that have a spatial aspect to them.

Biogeography is most keenly observed on the world's islands. These habitats are often much more manageable areas of study because they are more condensed than larger ecosystems on the mainland. Islands are also ideal locations because they allow scientists to look at habitats that new invasive species have only recently colonized and can observe how they disperse throughout the island and change it. They can then apply their understanding to similar but more complex mainland habitats. Islands are very diverse in their biomes, ranging from the tropical to arctic climates. This diversity in habitat allows for a wide range of species study in different parts of the world.

Charles Darwin recognized the importance of these geographic locations, and remarked in his journal that "the Zoology of Archipelagoes will be well worth examination". Two chapters in On the Origin of Species were devoted to geographical distribution.

== History ==
=== 18th century ===
The first discoveries that contributed to the development of biogeography as a science began in the mid-18th century, as Europeans explored the world and described the biodiversity of life. During the 18th century most views on the world were shaped around religion and for many natural theologists, the bible. Carl Linnaeus, in the mid-18th century, improved our classifications of organisms through the exploration of undiscovered territories by his students and disciples. When he noticed that species were not as perpetual as he believed, he developed the Mountain Explanation to explain the distribution of biodiversity; when Noah's ark landed on Mount Ararat and the waters receded, the animals dispersed throughout different elevations on the mountain. This showed that different species in different climates proved the fact that species are not constant. Linnaeus' findings set a basis for ecological biogeography. Through his strong beliefs in Christianity, he was inspired to classify the living world, which then gave way to additional accounts of secular views on geographical distribution. He argued that the structure of an animal was very closely related to its physical surroundings.

Closely after Linnaeus, Georges-Louis Leclerc, Comte de Buffon observed shifts in climate and how species spread across the globe as a result. Buffon believed there was a single species creation event, and he was the first to theorize different groups of organisms coming from different regions of the world. Buffon saw similarities between some regions which led him to believe that at one point continents were connected and then water separated them and caused differences in species. His hypotheses were described in his work, the 36 volume Histoire Naturelle, générale et particulière, in which he argued that varying geographical regions would have different forms of life, inspired by his observations comparing the Old and New World. He noted that similar environments in different regions of the world held separate and distinct species, a concept later known as Buffon's Law, which eventually became a major principle of biogeography. Buffon also studied fossils which led him to believe that the Earth was over tens of thousands of years old, and that humans had not lived there long in comparison to the age of the Earth.

=== 19th century ===
Following the period of exploration came the Age of Enlightenment in Europe, which attempted to explain the patterns of biodiversity observed by Buffon and Linnaeus. At the birth of the 19th century, Alexander von Humboldt, known as the "founder of plant geography", developed the concept of "physique generale" to demonstrate the unity of science and how species fit together. As one of the first to contribute empirical data to the science of biogeography through his travel as an explorer, he observed differences in climate and vegetation. The Earth was divided into regions which he defined as tropical, temperate, and arctic and within these regions there were similar forms of vegetation. This ultimately enabled him to create the isotherm (temperature lines on a map), which allowed scientists to see patterns of life within different climates. He contributed his observations to findings of botanical geography by previous scientists, and sketched this description of both the biotic and abiotic features of the Earth in his book, Cosmos.

Augustin de Candolle contributed to the field of biogeography as he observed species competition and the several differences that influenced the discovery of the diversity of life. He was a Swiss botanist and created the first Laws of Botanical Nomenclature in his work, Prodromus. He discussed plant distribution and his theories eventually had a great impact on Charles Darwin, who was inspired to consider species adaptations and evolution after learning about botanical geography. De Candolle was the first to describe the differences between the small-scale and large-scale distribution patterns of organisms around the globe.

Several additional scientists contributed new theories to further develop the concept of biogeography. Charles Lyell developed the Theory of Uniformitarianism after studying fossils. This theory explained how the world was not created by one sole catastrophic event, but instead from numerous creation events and locations. Uniformitarianism also introduced the idea that the Earth was actually significantly older than was previously accepted. Using this knowledge, Lyell concluded that it was possible for species to go extinct. Since he noted that Earth's climate changes, he realized that species distribution must also change accordingly. Lyell argued that climate changes complemented vegetation changes, thus connecting the environmental surroundings to varying species. This largely influenced Charles Darwin in his development of the theory of evolution.

Charles Darwin was a natural theologist who studied around the world, and most importantly in the Galapagos Islands. Darwin introduced the idea of natural selection, as he theorized against previously accepted ideas that species were static or unchanging. His contributions to biogeography and the theory of evolution were different from those of other explorers of his time, because he developed a mechanism to describe the ways that species changed. His influential ideas include the development of theories regarding the struggle for existence and natural selection. Darwin's theories started a biological segment to biogeography and empirical studies, which enabled future scientists to develop ideas about the geographical distribution of organisms around the globe.

Alfred Russel Wallace studied the distribution of flora and fauna in the Amazon Basin and the Malay Archipelago in the mid-19th century. His research was essential to the further development of biogeography, and he was later nicknamed the "father of Biogeography". Wallace conducted fieldwork researching the habits, breeding and migration tendencies, and feeding behavior of thousands of species. He studied butterfly and bird distributions in comparison to the presence or absence of geographical barriers. His observations led him to conclude that the number of organisms present in a community was dependent on the amount of food resources in the particular habitat. Wallace believed species were dynamic by responding to biotic and abiotic factors. He and Philip Sclater saw biogeography as a source of support for the theory of evolution as they used Darwin's conclusion to explain how biogeography was similar to a record of species inheritance. Key findings, such as the sharp difference in fauna either side of the Wallace Line, and the sharp difference that existed between North and South America prior to their relatively recent faunal interchange, can only be understood in this light. Otherwise, the field of biogeography would be seen as a purely descriptive one.

=== 20th and 21st century ===
Schematic distribution of fossils on Pangea according to Wegener

Moving on to the 20th century, Alfred Wegener introduced the Theory of Continental Drift in 1912, though it was not widely accepted until the 1960s. This theory was revolutionary because it changed the way that everyone thought about species and their distribution around the globe. The theory explained how continents were formerly joined in one large landmass, Pangea, and slowly drifted apart due to the movement of the plates below Earth's surface. The evidence for this theory is in the geological similarities between varying locations around the globe, the geographic distribution of some fossils (including the mesosaurs) on various continents, and the jigsaw puzzle shape of the landmasses on Earth. Though Wegener did not know the mechanism of this concept of Continental Drift, this contribution to the study of biogeography was significant in the way that it shed light on the importance of environmental and geographic similarities or differences as a result of climate and other pressures on the planet. Importantly, late in his career Wegener recognised that testing his theory required measurement of continental movement rather than inference from fossils species distributions.

In 1958 paleontologist Paul S. Martin published A Biogeography of Reptiles and Amphibians in the Gómez Farias Region, Tamaulipas, Mexico, which has been described as "ground-breaking" and "a classic treatise in historical biogeography". Martin applied several disciplines including ecology, botany, climatology, geology, and Pleistocene dispersal routes to examine the herpetofauna of a relatively small and largely undisturbed area, but ecologically complex, situated on the threshold of temperate – tropical (nearctic and neotropical) regions, including semiarid lowlands at 70 meters elevation and the northernmost cloud forest in the western hemisphere at over 2200 meters.

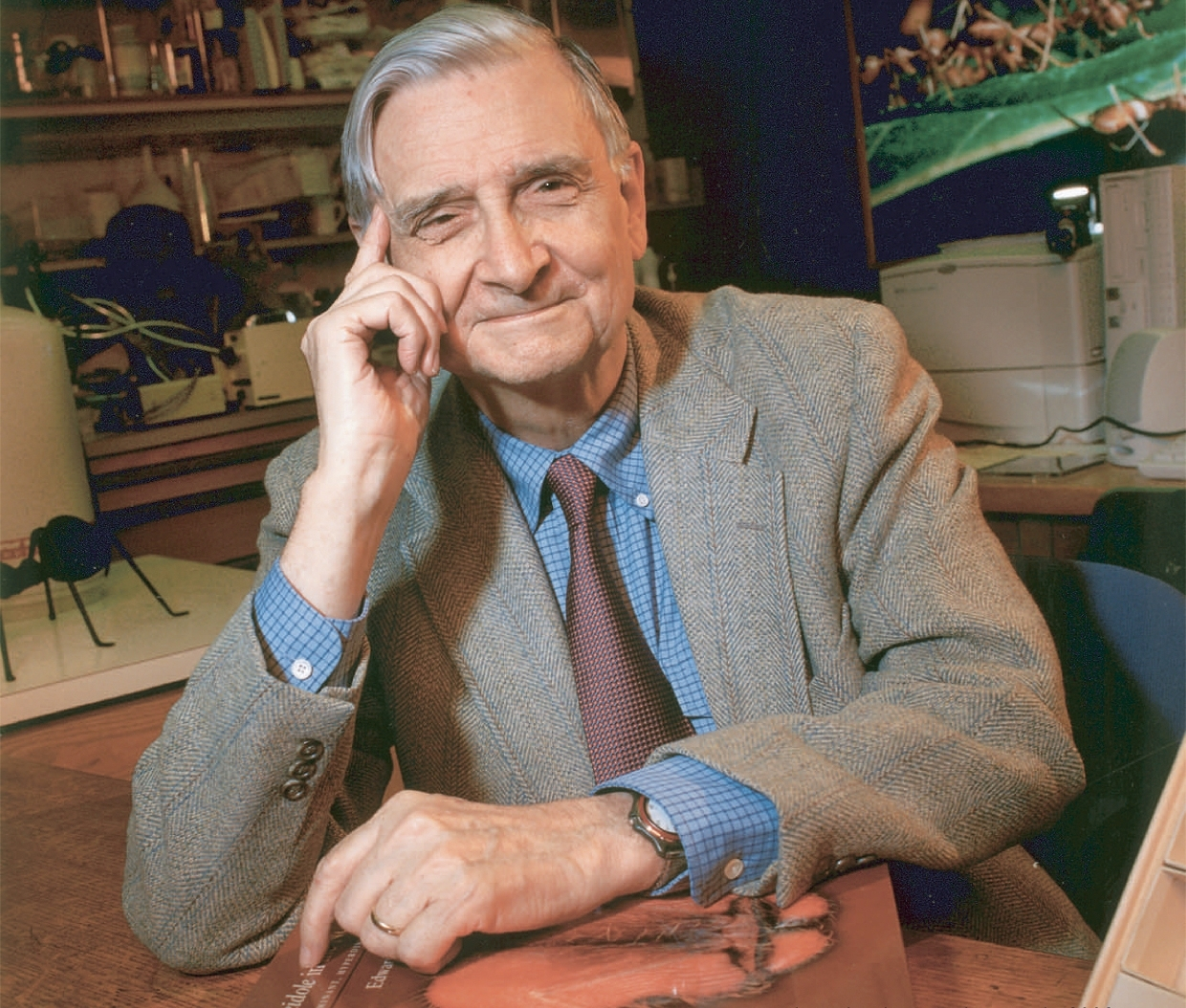
Biologist Edward O. Wilson, coauthored The Theory of Island Biogeography, which helped in stimulating much research on this topic in the late 20th and 21st. centuries.

The publication of The Theory of Island Biogeography by Robert MacArthur and E.O. Wilson in 1967 showed that the species richness of an area could be predicted in terms of such factors as habitat area, immigration rate and extinction rate. This added to the long-standing interest in island biogeography. The application of island biogeography theory to habitat fragments spurred the development of the fields of conservation biology and landscape ecology.

Classic biogeography has been expanded by the development of molecular systematics, creating a new discipline known as phylogeography. This development allowed scientists to test theories about the origin and dispersal of populations, such as island endemics. For example, while classic biogeographers were able to speculate about the origins of species in the Hawaiian Islands, phylogeography allows them to test theories of relatedness between these populations and putative source populations on various continents, notably in Asia and North America.

Biogeography continues as a point of study for many life sciences and geography students worldwide, however it may be under different broader titles within institutions such as ecology or evolutionary biology.

In recent years, one of the most important and consequential developments in biogeography has been to show how multiple organisms, including mammals like monkeys and reptiles like squamates, overcame barriers such as large oceans that many biogeographers formerly believed were impossible to cross. See also Oceanic dispersal.

== Modern applications ==
Biogeographic regions of Europe

Biogeography now incorporates many different fields including, but not limited to, physical geography, geology, plant biology, zoology, general biology, and modelling. A biogeographer's main focus is on how the environment and humans affect the distribution of species and genetic diversity. Biogeography is being applied to biodiversity conservation and planning, projecting global environmental changes on species and biomes, projecting the spread of infectious diseases, invasive species, and for supporting planning for the establishment of crops. Technological evolution and advances in knowledge have generated a suite of predictor variables for biogeographic analysis, including global satellite imaging and image processing of the Earth. Two main types of satellite imaging that are important within modern biogeography are Global Production Efficiency Model (GLO-PEM) and Geographic Information Systems (GIS). GLO-PEM uses satellite-imaging gives "repetitive, spatially contiguous, and time specific observations of vegetation". These observations are on a global scale. GIS can show certain processes on the earth's surface like whale locations, sea surface temperatures, and bathymetry. Current scientists also use coral reefs to delve into the history of biogeography through the fossilized reefs.

Two global information systems are either dedicated to, or have strong focus on, biogeography (in the form of the spatial location of observations of organisms), namely the Global Biodiversity Information Facility (GBIF: 2.57 billion species occurrence records reported as at August 2023) and, for marine species only, the Ocean Biodiversity Information System (OBIS, originally the Ocean Biogeographic Information System: 116 million species occurrence records reported as at August 2023), while at a national scale, similar compilations of species occurrence records also exist such as the U.K. National Biodiversity Network, the Atlas of Living Australia, and many others. In the case of the oceans, in 2017 Costello et al. analyzed the distribution of 65,000 species of marine animals and plants as then documented in OBIS, and used the results to distinguish 30 distinct marine realms, split between continental-shelf and offshore deep-sea areas.

Since it is self evident that compilations of species occurrence records cannot cover with any completeness, areas that have received either limited or no sampling, a number of methods have been developed to produce arguably more complete "predictive" or "modelled" distributions for species based on their associated environmental or other preferences (such as availability of food or other habitat requirements); this approach is known as either Environmental niche modelling (ENM) or Species distribution modelling (SDM). Depending on the reliability of the source data and the nature of the models employed (including the scales for which data are available), maps generated from such models may then provide better representations of the "real" biogeographic distributions of either individual species, groups of species, or biodiversity as a whole, however it should also be borne in mind that historic or recent human activities (such as hunting of great whales, or other human-induced exterminations) may have altered present-day species distributions from their potential "full" ecological footprint. Examples of predictive maps produced by niche modelling methods based on either GBIF (terrestrial) or OBIS (marine, plus some freshwater) data are the former Lifemapper project at the University of Kansas (now continued as a part of BiotaPhy) and AquaMaps, which as at 2023 contain modelled distributions for around 200,000 terrestrial, and 33,000 species of teleosts, marine mammals, and invertebrates. One advantage of ENM/SDM is that in addition to showing current (or even past) modelled distributions, insertion of changed parameters such as the anticipated effects of climate change can also be used to show potential changes in species distributions that may occur in the future based on such scenarios.

== Paleobiogeography ==
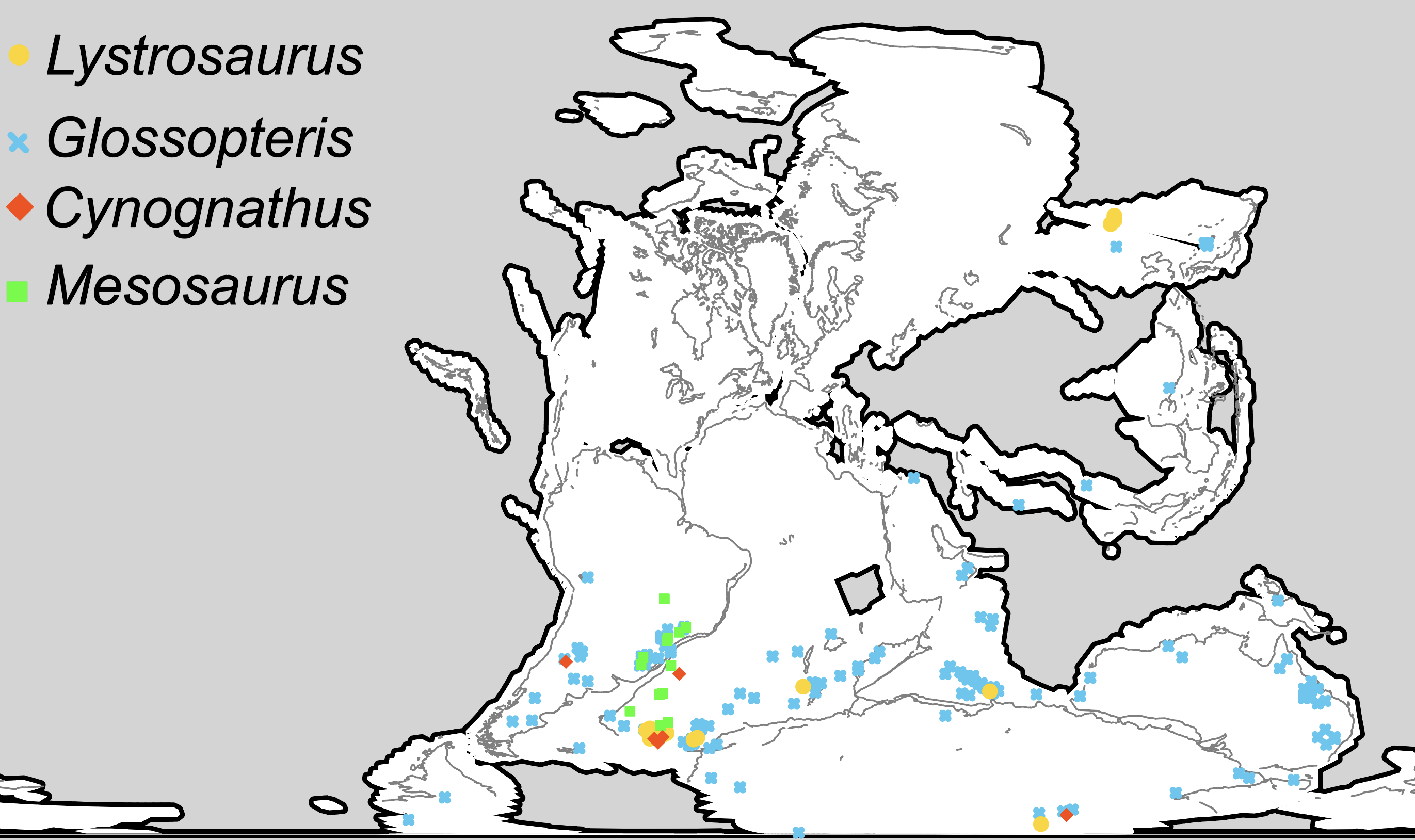
Distribution of four Permian and Triassic fossil groups used as biogeographic evidence for continental drift, and land bridging

Paleobiogeography goes one step further to include paleogeographic data and considerations of plate tectonics. Using molecular analyses and corroborated by fossils, it has been possible to demonstrate that perching birds evolved first in the region of Australia or the adjacent Antarctic (which at that time lay somewhat further north and had a temperate climate). From there, they spread to the other Gondwanan continents and Southeast Asia – the part of Laurasia then closest to their origin of dispersal – in the late Paleogene, before achieving a global distribution in the early Neogene. Not knowing that at the time of dispersal, the Indian Ocean was much narrower than it is today, and that South America was closer to the Antarctic, one would be hard pressed to explain the presence of many "ancient" lineages of perching birds in Africa, as well as the mainly South American distribution of the suboscines.

Paleobiogeography also helps constrain hypotheses on the timing of biogeographic events such as vicariance and geodispersal, and provides unique information on the formation of regional biotas. For example, data from species-level phylogenetic and biogeographic studies tell us that the Amazonian teleost fauna accumulated in increments over a period of tens of millions of years, principally by means of allopatric speciation, and in an arena extending over most of the area of tropical South America. In other words, unlike some of the well-known insular faunas (Galapagos finches, Hawaiian drosophilid flies, African rift lake cichlids), the species-rich Amazonian ichthyofauna is not the result of recent adaptive radiations.

For freshwater organisms, landscapes are divided naturally into discrete drainage basins by watersheds, episodically isolated and reunited by erosional processes. In regions like the Amazon Basin (or more generally Greater Amazonia, the Amazon basin, Orinoco basin, and Guianas) with an exceptionally low (flat) topographic relief, the many waterways have had a highly reticulated history over geological time. In such a context, stream capture is an important factor affecting the evolution and distribution of freshwater organisms. Stream capture occurs when an upstream portion of one river drainage is diverted to the downstream portion of an adjacent basin. This can happen as a result of tectonic uplift (or subsidence), natural damming created by a landslide, or headward or lateral erosion of the watershed between adjacent basins.

== Concepts and fields ==
Biogeography is a synthetic science, related to geography, biology, soil science, geology, climatology, ecology and evolution.

Some fundamental concepts in biogeography include:

- allopatric speciation – the splitting of a species by evolution of geographically isolated populations
- evolution – change in genetic composition of a population
- extinction – disappearance of a species
- dispersal – movement of populations away from their point of origin, related to migration
- endemic areas
- geodispersal – the erosion of barriers to biotic dispersal and gene flow, that permit range expansion and the merging of previously isolated biotas
- range and distribution
- vicariance – the formation of barriers to biotic dispersal and gene flow, that tend to subdivide species and biotas, leading to speciation and extinction; vicariance biogeography is the field that studies these patterns

=== Comparative biogeography ===
The study of comparative biogeography can follow two main lines of investigation:

- Systematic biogeography, the study of biotic area relationships, their distribution, and hierarchical classification
- Evolutionary biogeography, the proposal of evolutionary mechanisms responsible for organismal distributions. Possible mechanisms include widespread taxa disrupted by continental break-up or individual episodes of long-distance movement.

== Biogeographic units ==
There are many types of biogeographic units used in biogeographic regionalisation schemes, as there are many criteria (species composition, physiognomy, ecological aspects) and hierarchization schemes: biogeographic realms (ecozones), bioregions (sensu stricto), ecoregions, zoogeographical regions, floristic regions, vegetation types, biomes, etc.

The terms biogeographic unit or biogeographic area can be used for these regions, regardless of where they fall in any hierarchy.

In 2008, an International Code of Area Nomenclature was proposed for biogeography. It achieved limited success; some studies commented favorably on it, but others were much more critical, and it "has not yet gained a significant following". Similarly, a set of rules for paleobiogeography has achieved limited success. In 2000, Westermann suggested that the difficulties in getting formal nomenclatural rules established in this field might be related to "the curious fact that neither paleo- nor neobiogeographers are organized in any formal groupings or societies, nationally (so far as I know) or internationally — an exception among active disciplines."

== See also ==
- Allen's rule
- Bergmann's rule
- Biogeographic realm
- Bibliography of biology
- Biogeography-based optimization
- Center of origin
- Concepts and Techniques in Modern Geography
- Distance decay
- Ecological land classification
- Floristics
- Geobiology
- Macroecology
- Marine ecoregions
- Max Carl Wilhelm Weber
- Miklos Udvardy
- Phytochorion
- Phytogeography
- Sky island
- Systematic and evolutionary biogeography association
