= Geodispersal =

Erosion of barriers to gene flow and biological dispersal

In biogeography, geodispersal is the erosion of barriers to gene flow and biological dispersal (Lieberman, 2005.; Albert and Crampton, 2010.). Geodispersal differs from vicariance, which reduces gene flow through the creation of geographic barriers. In geodispersal, the geographical ranges of individual taxa, or of whole biotas, are merged by erosion of a physical barrier to gene flow or dispersal. Multiple related geodispersal and vicariance events can be mutually responsible for differences among populations. As these geographic barriers break down, organisms of the secluded ecosystems can interact, allowing gene flow between previously separated species, creating more biological variation within a region.

A well documented example of geodispersal in between continental ecosystems was the Great American Biotic Interchange (GABI) between the terrestrial faunas and floras of North America and South America, that followed the formation of the Isthmus of Panama about 3 million years ago. Between 69 and 47 million years ago, the Thulean Land Bridge facilitated gene flow by allowing bees from the Old World to travel to the New World, an example of geodispersal from the Old World to the New World. Another example was the formation of the modern Amazon River Basin about 10 million years ago, which involved the merging of previously isolated Neotropical fish faunas to form what is now the most species-rich continental aquatic ecosystem on Earth (Oberdorff et al., 2011).
