= West Lake =

Lake in Hangzhou, China

- 西湖
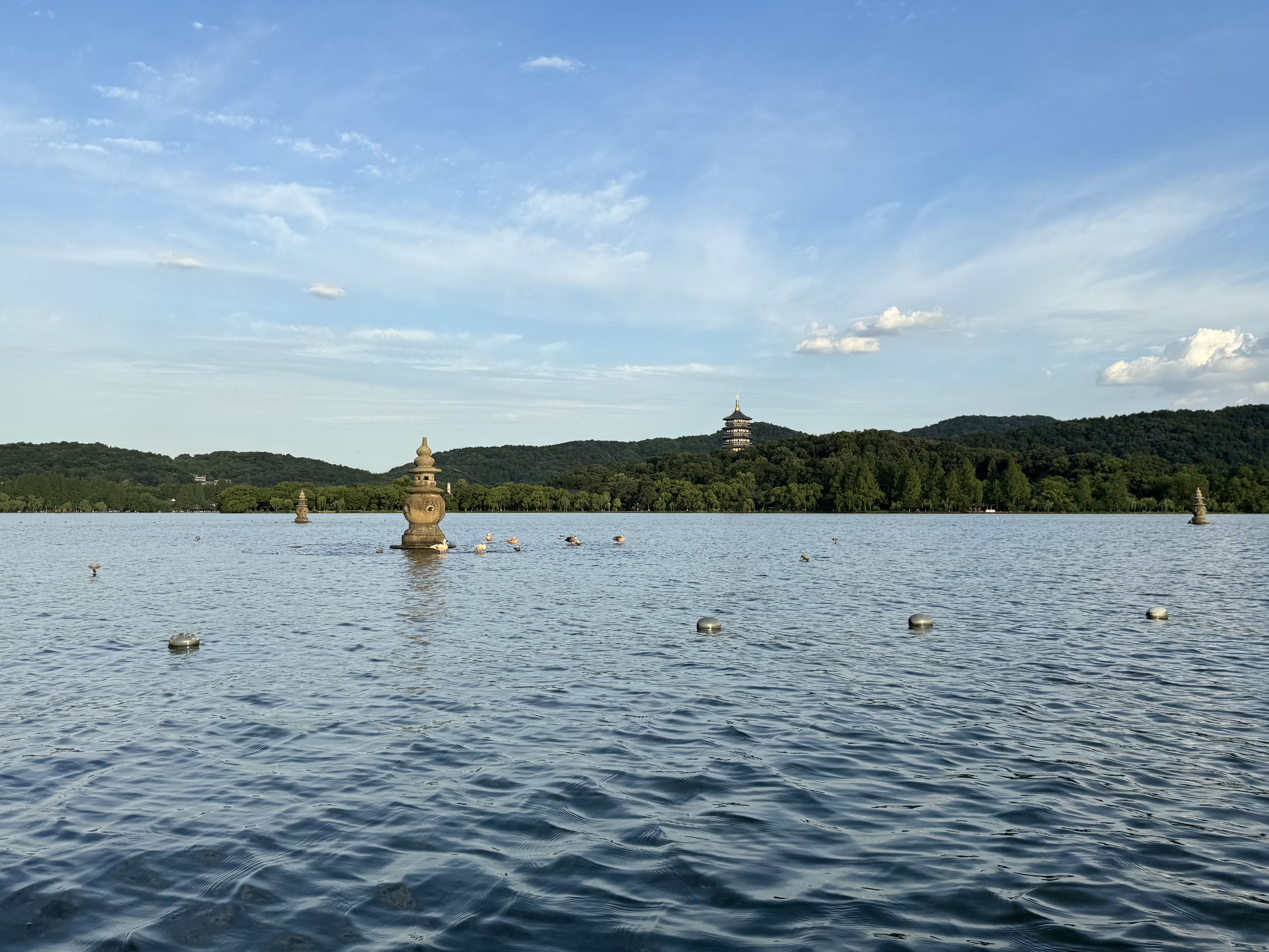

- Location within Zhejiang
- Interactive map of West Lake
- Location: Xihu District, Hangzhou, Zhejiang, China
- Coordinates: 30°14′49″N 120°08′39″E
- Type: Freshwater lake
- Primary outflows: The Grand Canal
- Catchment area: 21.22 km^{2} (8.19 sq mi)
- Basin countries: China
- Managing agency: Management Committee of Hangzhou West Lake Scenic Area
- Max. length: 3.2 km (2.0 mi)
- Max. width: 2.8 km (1.7 mi)
- Surface area: 1,580 acres (6.4 km^{2})
- Average depth: 2.27 m (7 ft 5 in)
- Water volume: 14,290,000 m^{3} (505,000,000 cu ft)
- Residence time: China Standard Time
- Shore length^{1}: 15 km (9.3 mi)
- Surface elevation: 10 m (33 ft)
- Frozen: Rarely
- Islands: Gushan, Lesser Yingzhou, Mid-Lake Pavilion, and Ruan Gong Islet
- Sections/sub-basins: Outer West Lake, Inner West Lake, West Inner Lake, Small South Lake, Yue Lake
- Settlements: Hangzhou

UNESCO World Heritage Site
- Official name: West Lake Cultural Landscape of Hangzhou
- Location: China
- Criteria: (ii)(iii)(vi)
- Reference: 1334
- Inscription: 2011 (35th Session)
- Area: 3,322.88 ha (8,211.0 acres)
- Buffer zone: 7,270.31 ha (17,965.3 acres)

Chinese name
- Chinese: 西湖
- Literal meaning: "West Lake"
Transcriptions
Standard Mandarin
- Hanyu Pinyin: Xī Hú
- IPA: [ɕí xǔ]
Wu
- Romanization: Si^{平} wu^{去} [si ɦu]
Yue: Cantonese
- Yale Romanization: Sāi wùh
- Jyutping: sai1 wu4
- IPA: [sɐj˥ wu˩]
Southern Min
- Tâi-lô: Se ôo
- ^{1} Shore length is not a well-defined measure.

West Lake, also known as Xihu and by other names, is a freshwater lake in Hangzhou, China. Situated to the west of Hangzhou's former walled city, the lake has a surface area of 6.39 km^{2} (2.47 sq mi), stretching 3.2 km (2.0 mi) from north to south and 2.8 km (1.7 mi) from east to west. In the lake are four causeways, three artificial islands, and Gushan, the only natural island. Gentle hills surround the lake on its north, west, and south sides, with the Leifeng and Baochu pagodas standing in pair on the south and north banks. Several famous temples are nestled in the mountains west of the lake, including Lingyin and Jingci Temples.

A tourist attraction since the Tang dynasty (618–907), the lake has influenced poets and painters throughout Chinese history for its natural beauty and historic relics. By the Song dynasty (960–1279), during which the dynastic capital moved to Hangzhou, it had become a cultural landmark and one of the most visited tourist destinations of China. Introduced to Europeans by Marco Polo, the lake was once a symbol of Chinese urban culture. It has been featured on Chinese currency, including the one-yuan banknote in the 1979 Bank of China Foreign Exchange Certificate and the 2005 Renminbi, as well as in the Chinese passport. A UNESCO World Heritage Site since 2011, the lake is recognised to have influenced garden designs in China, Japan, and Korea over the centuries as "an idealised fusion between humans and nature."

The lake, along with the surrounding hills, constitutes the West Lake Scenic Area, which is governed by the Management Committee of Hangzhou West Lake Scenic Area, a special administration dedicated to cultural preservation and gardening under the Hangzhou municipal government since 2002. The first major Chinese tourist attraction to cancel admission fees, the scenic area is crowded during public holidays. Over the 2024 National Day holiday, the area received 4.426 million visitors in seven days, a 30.92% rise from the previous year.

== Names ==
Historically, the lake has been referred to by various names, including Qiantang Lake. The first description of the waters near Hangzhou was made in the Book of Han finished in 111, which states,

The Western Commandery Captain of Qiantang was stationed at the Wulin Hills, where the Wulin River originates. The river flows eastward into the sea, covering a distance of 830 li [350 km; 220 mi].

This statement about the Wulin River (武林水) is widely interpreted as the first mention of West Lake, while the Wulin Hills (武林山) are believed to be the hills near the Lingyin Temple.

Bai Juyi was among the first to refer to the lake as "West Lake", due to its location to the west of the city. Su Shi was the first to use the name in official documents, in his request to the Imperial Court for the dredging of the lake in 1090. 16th-century Chinese scholars considered the West Lake of Hangzhou to be the most famous among the 35 other lakes with the same name in China. In English, the name has also been variously translated and romanized as the West Lake, the Western Lake, Si-hu, Hsi Hu, Xi Hu, Lake Si, Lake Hsi, Lake Hsi-hu, and Xi Lake. Due to Su Shi's famous comparison with Xizi, the lake is also sometimes described in Chinese as Xizi Lake.

== History ==
=== Natural formation and dredging efforts ===
About 4,400 to 2,500 years ago, as sea levels fell, the Hangzhou-Jiaxing-Huzhou plain began to emerge, while West Lake was merely a shallow bay. Over time, the Qiantang River gradually deposited sand and rocks outside this bay. About 2,000 years ago, a lagoon was formed. Streams from the surrounding mountains transformed the water into freshwater, but ongoing silt deposits gradually reduced the lake to a swamp. In local folklore, when Qin Shi Huang (259–210 BC), the first emperor of China, visited Hangzhou, West Lake was still part of the Qiantang River. The giant rock on the north bank of West Lake was said to be where the emperor anchored his fleet. According to Records of the Grand Historian, during his visit in 210 BC, the emperor was halted in Hangzhou by the strong tide of the Qiantang River and had to take a detour westward to reach Shaoxing. During the Eastern Han era (25–220), local official Hua Xin ordered the construction of a seawall to completely cut the lake off from the sea. In 591, the government seat of Hangzhou, originally on the west shore, was relocated to the newly built walled city east of the lake. With the completion of the Grand Canal, Hangzhou, as its destination, became a transport hub of China.

"The lovely Spring breeze has come
Back to the Lake of the West.
The Spring waters are so clear and
Green they might be freshly painted.
The clouds of perfume are sweeter
Than can be imagined. In the
Gentle East wind the petals
Fall like grains of rice."
—Ouyang Xiu (1007–1072), excerpts from Spring Day on West Lake

Before the Tang dynasty (618–907), West Lake was a shallow body of water, but continuous dredging efforts prevented it from becoming a swamp. During the Jianzhong period (780–783) of the Tang dynasty, local official Li Bi diverted water into Hangzhou via underground pipes, creating six ponds to secure the city's water supply. In 822, Bai Juyi dredged West Lake and used the silt to build a long causeway between Qiantang and Yuhang Gates, which was named in his memory. Under the Wuyue Kingdom (907–932), with Hangzhou being the capital, King Qian Liu ordered annual dredging of West Lake with soldiers to maintain water quality for water supply. In the Song dynasty, Su Shi (1037–1101) ordered the construction of the Su Causeway from dredged silt in 1089. He designated an area of the lake with three stone pagodas to prevent water chestnut planting and reduce silting, which may mark the origin of the "Three Ponds Mirroring the Moon." By 1275, military patrols were appointed to maintain and police the lake, where littering of any rubbish or planting additional lotuses or water-chestnuts were forbidden.

=== From literary tradition to tourism ===
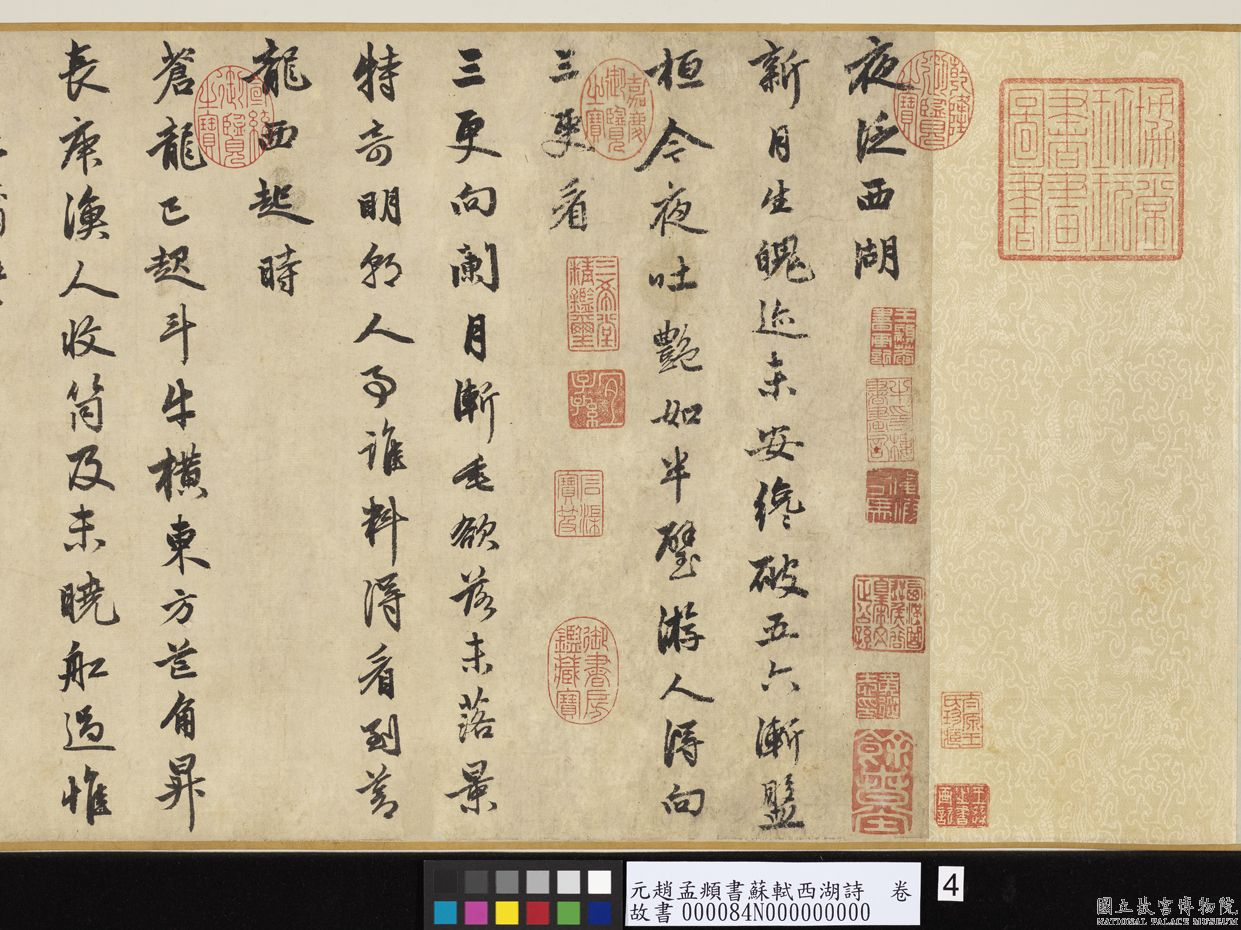
Su Shi's Verse on West Lake by Zhao Mengfu in 1320

Literary works by renowned literati contributed to the fame of Hangzhou's West Lake among Chinese intellectuals. Especially, the lake became associated with the two greatest poets of Middle-Period China, Bai Juyi and Su Shi. Su Xiaoxiao, a famous courtesan and poet of Southern Qi (479–502), was buried upon West Lake. Her life and poetry have inspired later poets, including Li He and Wen Tingyun. Over time, local history became intertwined with the natural beauty. For example, Bai Juyi celebrates Su Xiaoxiao's beauty and her connection to the enchanting scenery of the lake in one of his poem. When Su Shi (1037–1101) famously compared West Lake to Xizi, one of the Four Beauties of ancient China, the lake also became known as the Xizi Lake:

水光瀲灧睛方好，
山色空濛雨亦奇。
欲把西湖比西子，
淡妝濃抹總相宜。

Translation:

The shimmering water shines in clear light,
While misty mountains bring rain's charm to sight.
If West Lake I liken to Xizi fair,
Both light and heavy makeup suits her well.

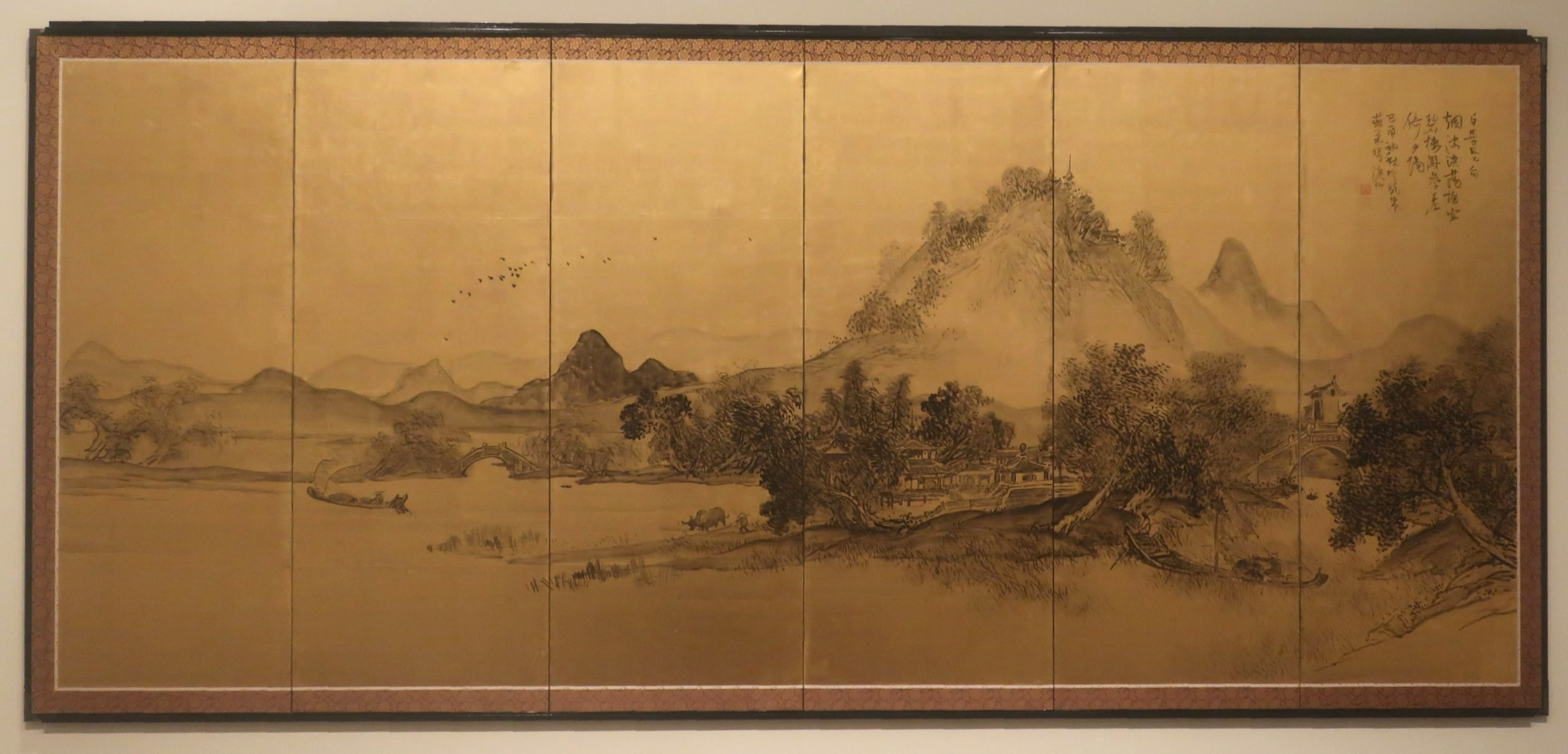
West Lake by Japanese painter Tomita Keisen (1909), with a tribute to Bai Juyi in the writing

During the period of Wuyue Kingdom (907–978), numerous temples, pagodas, shrines, and grottoes were built or expanded around the lake, including Lingyin, Zhaoqing, Jingci, Li’an, Liutong, and Taoguang temples, as well as the Baochu, Liuhe, Leifeng, and White pagodas, due to the devotion of its rulers to Buddhism. Since the 12th and 13th centuries, these temples, frequently visited by Japanese monks, played a significant role in circulating cultural images of the lake across East Asia, as these visitors returned to their home countries.

Wars and conflicts in northern China during the Song dynasty—including invasions by the Khitan, Jurchen, and Mongols—triggered significant migration southward to the new capital, leading to urbanisation and economic prosperity. With city walls blocking much of the natural scenery, West Lake became a favoured destination for urban residents seeking respite from the demands of city life and political turmoil. In 1129, the capital of the Song dynasty was relocated to Hangzhou, after the country lost its northern territories to the Jurchen. The imperial examination held every three years filled Hangzhou with educated individuals, who often enjoyed the lake's beauty and consulted fortune-tellers at lakeside temples. Visiting West Lake inspired poems that reflected on their experiences and memories of the scenery.

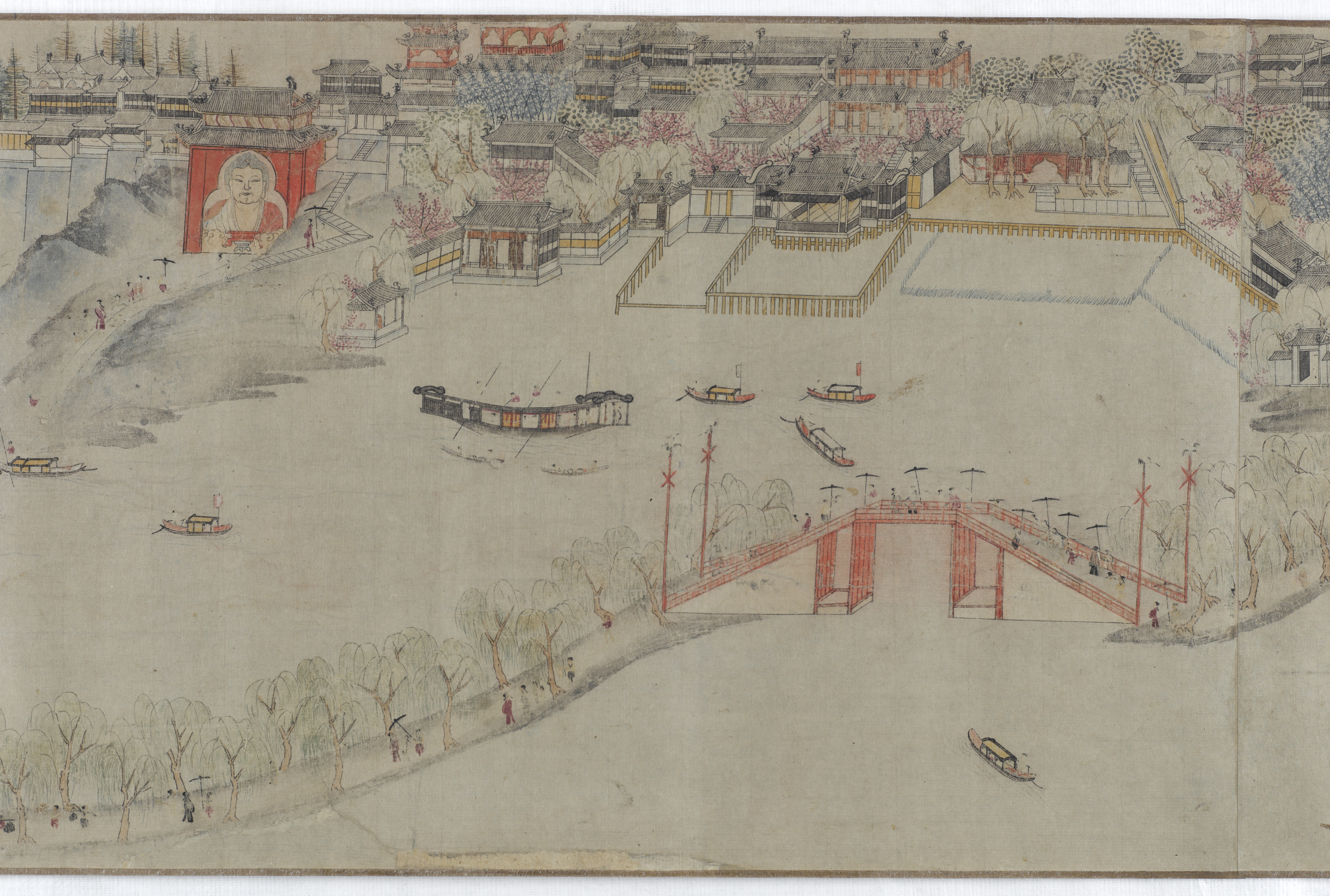
Scenic Attractions of West Lake (c. 14th century)

By the late Song dynasty, West Lake had evolved into a significant hub where tourism emerged. While pilgrimage and contemplative retreat had previously been the main motives for travel, sightseeing gained wide acceptance as an activity focused on enjoyment and the appreciation of natural beauty, roughly at the same time as in western Europe. Aesthetic appreciation of landscapes became a popular business, with diverse entertainment options which involved standardised routes and viewing orders made available to cater to various preferences and budgets. Tour guides, seasonal markets and specialty shops emerged. The notion of Ten Scenes of West Lake was invented. Boating on the lake was a popular pastime, with records noting hundreds of intricately carved, elegantly decorated boats gliding gracefully over the water.

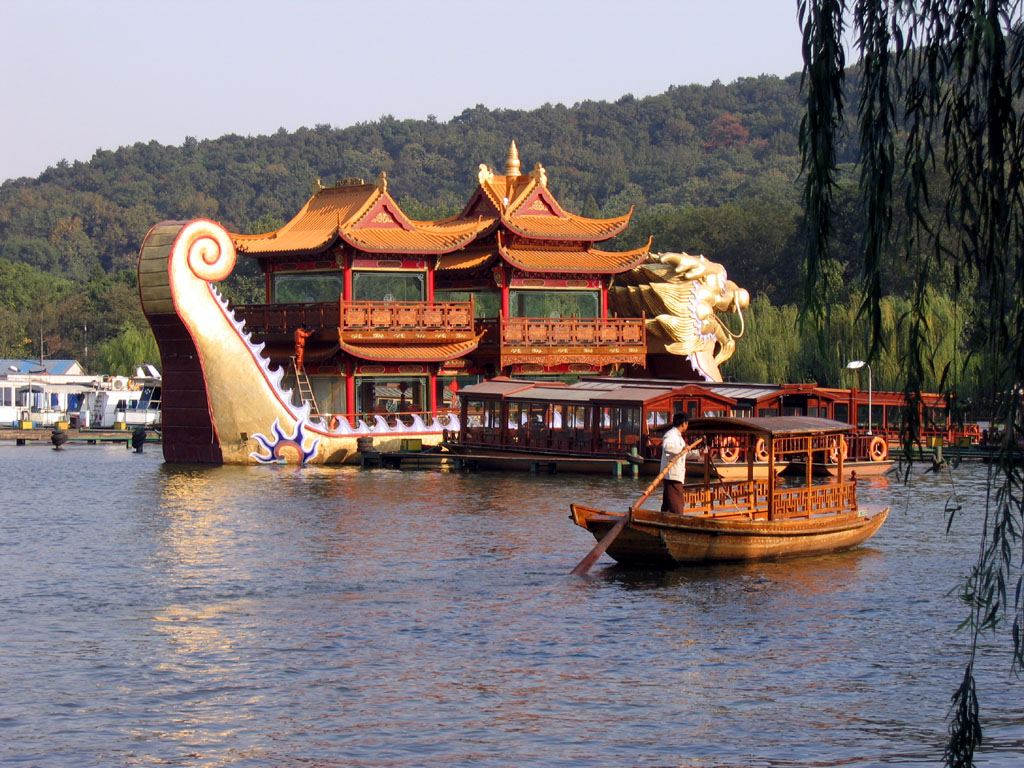
Decorated boats on the lake

Shortly after the Mongol conquest of China, West Lake remained socially vibrant. The official records show that in 1309, the city received more than 1,200 foreign visitors within half a year, many from Turkestan and Europe. West Lake was dredged and renamed the “Pond of Freeing Captive Animals” under Kublai Khan, while parts of the lake area were gradually cultivated into farmland. Among the visitors was Marco Polo, who describes the lake in his book,

Inside the city there is a Lake which has a compass of some 30 miles: and all round it are erected beautiful palaces and mansions, of the richest and most exquisite structure that you can imagine, belonging to the nobles of the city. There are also on its shores many abbeys and churches of the Idolaters. In the middle of the Lake are two Islands, on each of which stands a rich, beautiful and spacious edifice, furnished in such style as to seem fit for the palace of an Emperor.

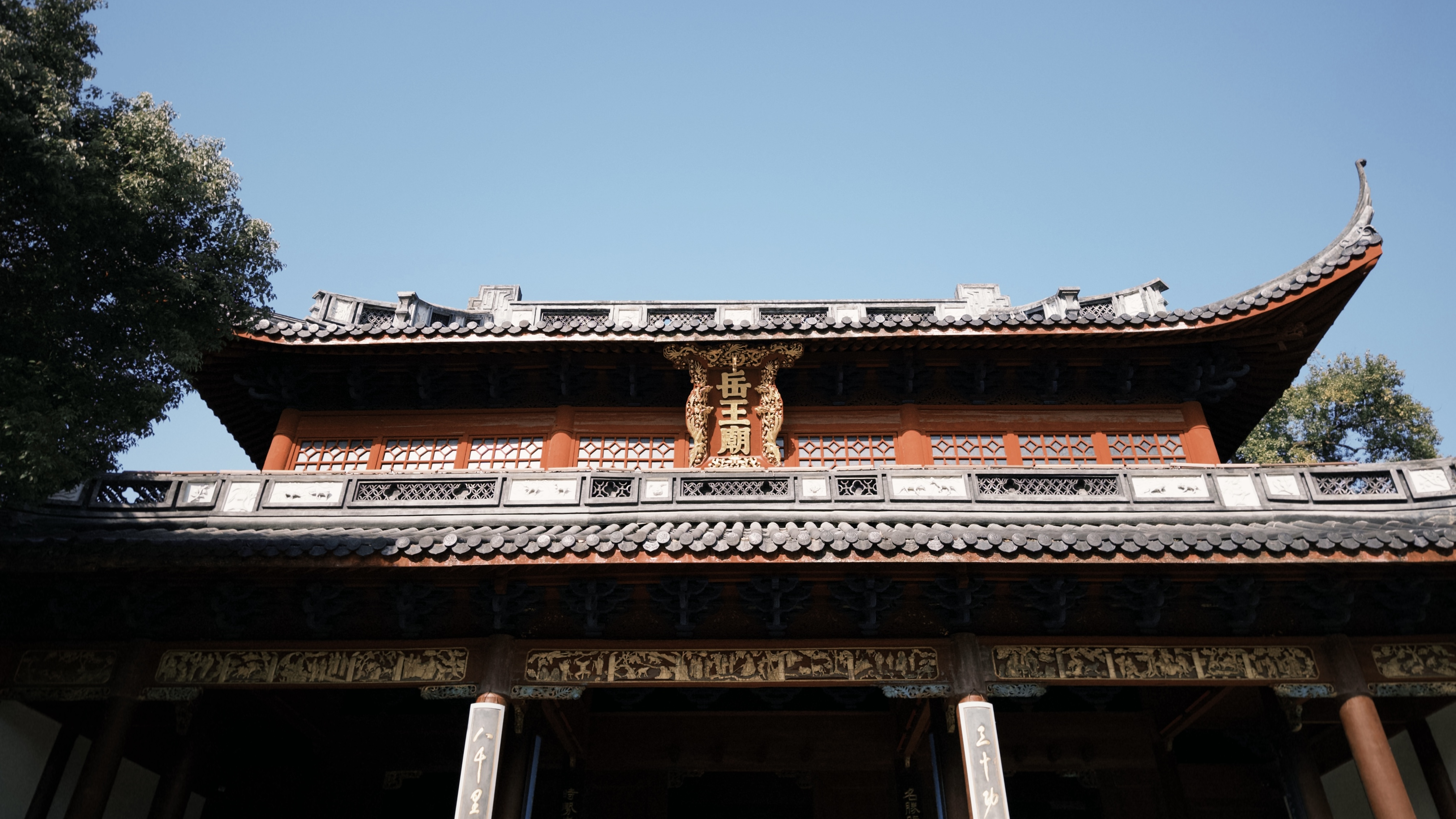
Yue Fei Temple

=== Mongol rule and fall of tourism ===
The booming tourism led to different interpretations. The lake was regarded as a literary tradition, a symbol of the state and a part of local history and knowledge, but for some, a symbol of extravagance and luxury. One of the most famous portrayal comes from Lin Sheng, who penned a poem as a satirical commentary on how people were engrossed in their indulgence in Hangzhou's pleasures, rather than making efforts to reclaim the lost northern capital:

山外青山樓外樓，
西湖歌舞幾時休？
暖風熏得遊人醉，
直把杭州作汴州。

Translation:

Beyond the hills, more hills rise, beyond the pavilions, more pavilions stand.
When will the songs and dances on West Lake finally end?
The warm breeze intoxicates the travellers,
Making them mistake Hangzhou for Bianzhou.

In 1142, Yue Fei, a hawkish Chinese general known for his determined efforts to reclaim northern China, was executed by the dovish emperor and his chief councillor. Yue's death marked the end of attempts to recapture the north, as the emperor prioritised peace despite the Song army's successes. Yue Fei remained widely admired among Chinese people and was widely celebrated as a national hero. In 1162, his wrongful execution was acknowledged, and his remains were moved to a tomb by West Lake. Since 1221, a nearby temple has been repurposed in his memory.

The Mongol-led Yuan dynasty (1271–1368) saw the decline of tourism at West Lake. Government support for maintaining the lake diminished, as Mongol rulers placed their political and economic focus on northern China rather than the south. The Mongol rulers, as well as local residents, blamed the lavish life upon the lake for the fall of Song. Therefore, the lake was abandoned. When the Ming dynasty replaced Mongol rule, Hangzhou gradually regained its prosperity by the mid-15th century. However, the lake experienced droughts in 1442 and 1456, causing it to dry up temporarily.

=== Revitalisation in Late Imperial China ===
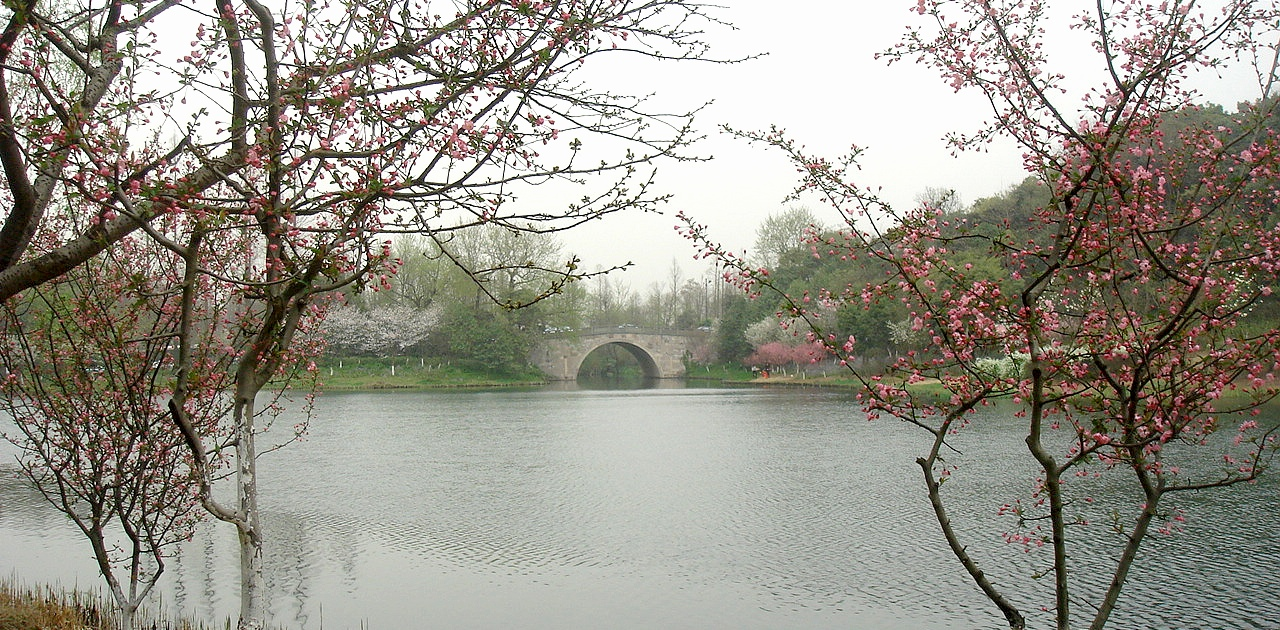
Yanggong Causeway (est. 1508)

Since the mid-Ming era, renewed dredging projects rekindled public interest in West Lake. As Hangzhou developed as a publishing centre, the production of geographic texts stimulated tourism, which in turn further fuelled the publishing industry. In 1508, Hangzhou governor Yang Mengying led a major dredging effort, repairing the Su and Bai Causeways and creating the Yanggong Causeway in his memory. This restoration returned the lake's appearance to its Tang dynasty splendour. Further construction works in 1576, 1607-1611 and 1621 built the Mid-Lake Pavilion and the Lesser Yingzhou Islet. The period of time saw the publication of a series of books on local history and culture which depicted West Lake, inspiring Japanese gardens such as the Kyū Shiba Rikyū Garden.

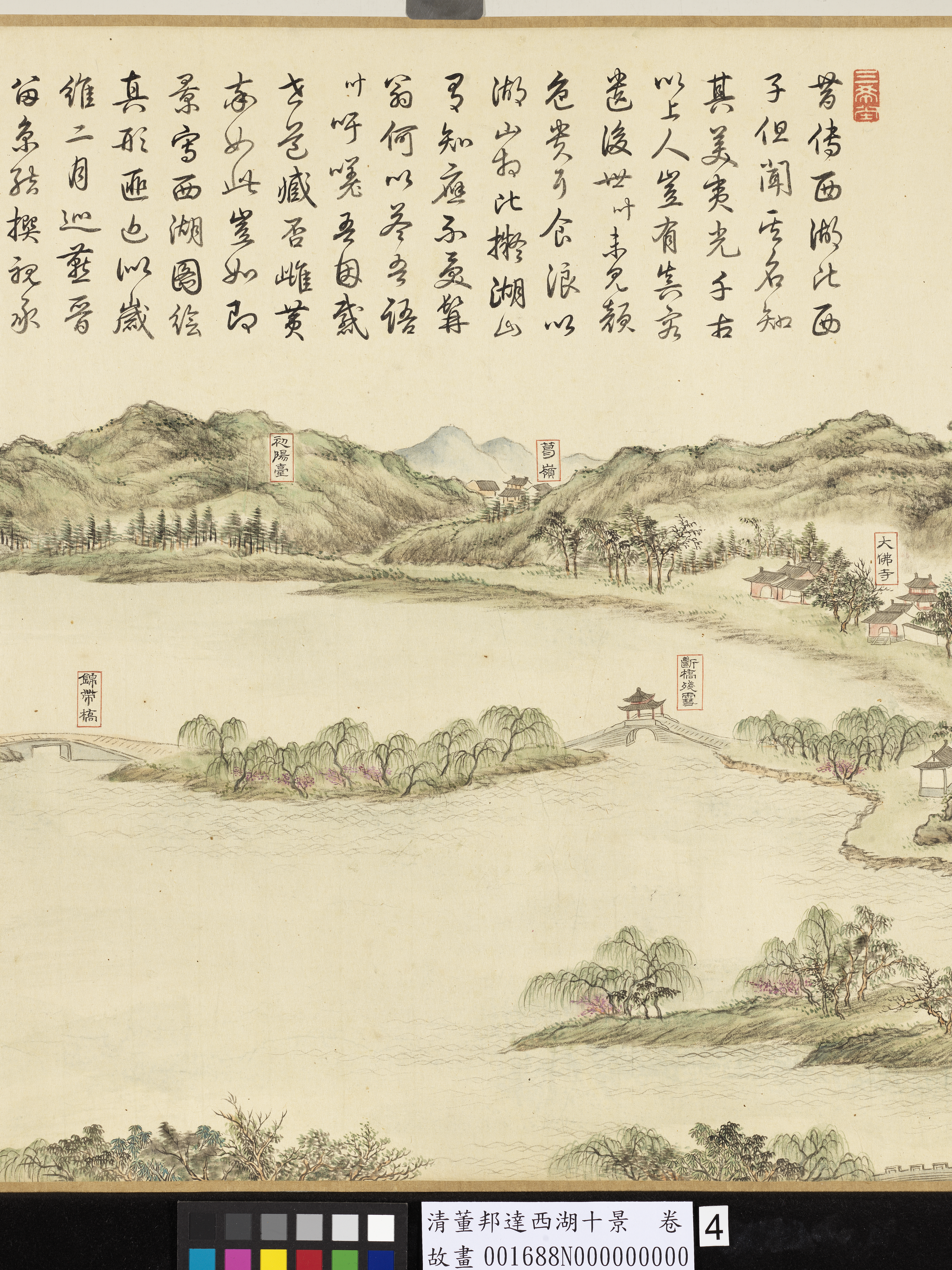
Ten Scenic Spots of West Lake (mid-18th century)

The Manchu conquered Hangzhou in 1645, which led to the construction of residences alongside the lake. During the High Qing era (1683–1799), emperors frequented southern China, to symbolise their control. Due to the visits by the Qing emperors, the lake was fully dredged and renovated. In 1689, a temporary imperial palace was built on Gushan. In 1722, Zhejiang governor Li Wei was ordered to dredge the lake. In 1809, Ruan Gong Islet was built with silted soil, which was named after Ruan Yuan, then governor of Zhejiang.

The emperors revived and standardised the notion of the Ten Scenes of West Lake. The Kangxi Emperor inscribed titles for these scenes, which were later carved into stelae beneath ten pavilions. The Qianlong Emperor composed poems during his visits, which were then inscribed on the reverse side of Kangxi's stelae. He further inscribed the Eight Scenes of Dragon Well in the surrounding hills. In Beijing, imperial gardens, including the Garden of Delighted Spring and the Old Summer Palace, were designed to imitate the landscape designs of West Lake.

After the Taiping Rebellion (1850–1864) destroyed various buildings beside the lake, West Lake revived as major Qing military leaders, magnates, and ranking officials, such as Peng Yulin built their villas upon the lake, which later became their memorial temples and shrines that were later maintained by a dedicated division of local government. In 1864, the West Lake Dredging Bureau was established, to manage the dredging of the lake.

=== Modern era ===
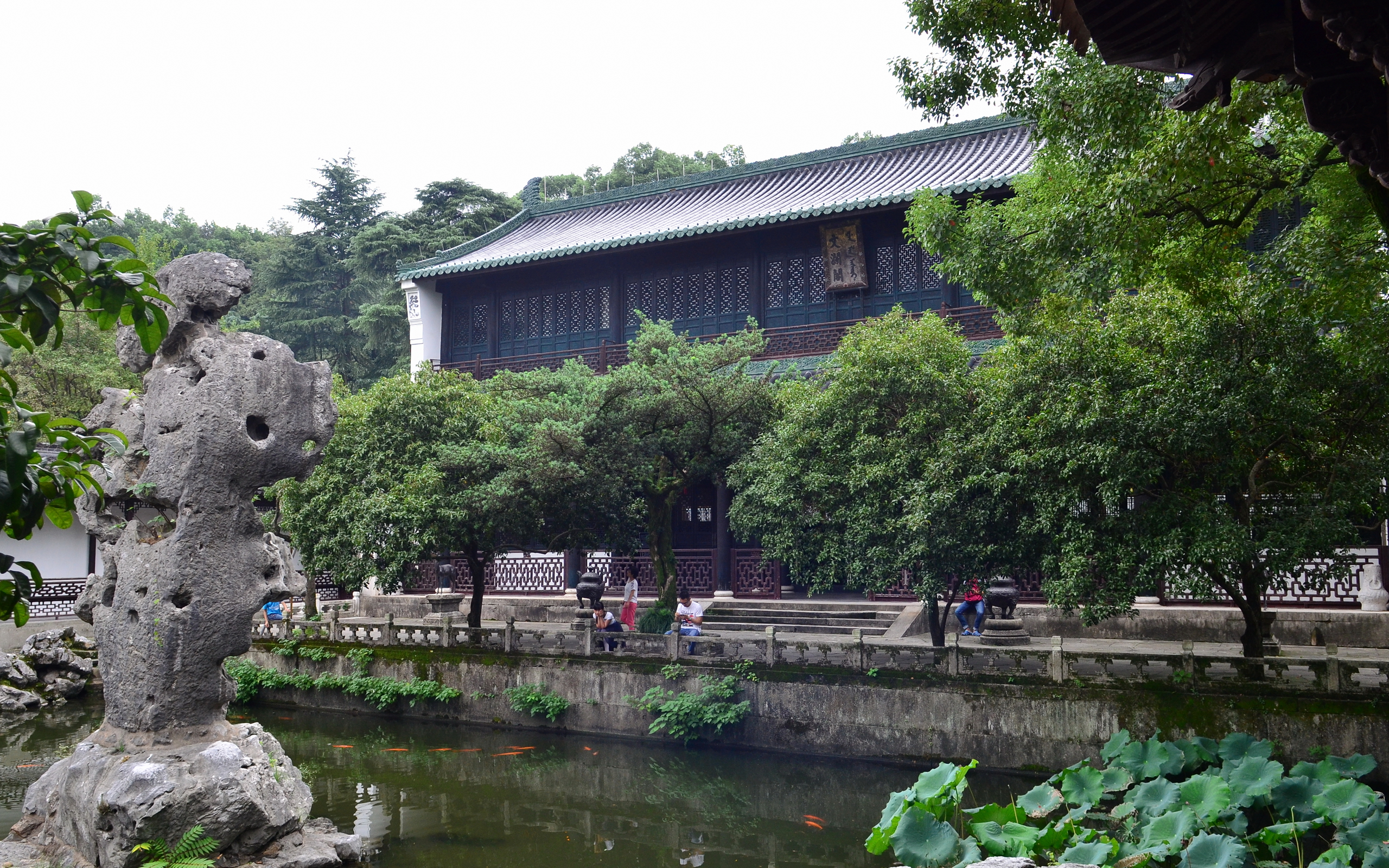
Wenlan Pavilion, an imperial library that became part of Zhejiang Provincial Museum in 1929

Following the 1911 revolution that ended the Qing dynasty, the Manchu quarter of the city was demolished, including both its separate fortifications and the section of the city wall that separated it from the lakefront. Qing imperial properties around West Lake were also nationalised. Land in the Manchu quarter was sold at auction to establish a New Business District and the lakefront renovated as a string of public parks, integrating West Lake into the new heart of the city. The former imperial palace on Gushan was converted into Zhongshan Park, named for Sun Yat-sen. The buildings associated with former Qing officials and generals were renamed after Ming loyalists, as with the Shrine of Former Martyrs. The railway link between Hangzhou and Shanghai, completed in 1909, stimulated local tourism.

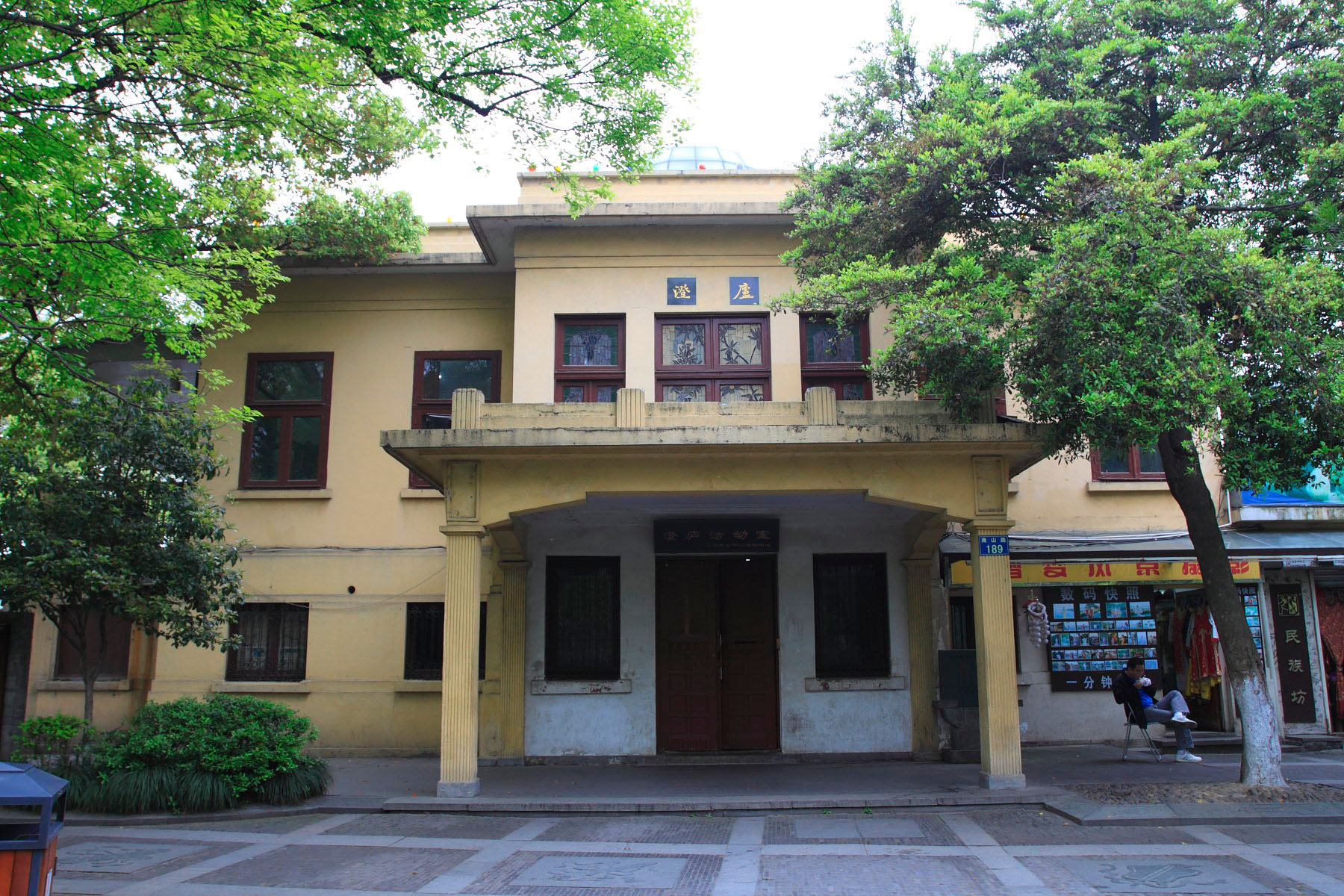
Chiang Kai-shek's West Lake residence

A great number of lakeside villas and garden were built, and further tombs were forbidden to be built around the lake. The visitors to the lake included notable literati, such as Rabindranath Tagore and Ryūnosuke Akutagawa, as well as the couple of Chiang Kai-shek and Soong Mei-ling spent their honeymoon by the lake. In 1922, the Chinese Communist Party held the Hangzhou Plenum here, initiating the first collaboration with Nationalists. In 1928, the National Academy of Art was founded on Gushan Island.

From 6 June to 20 October 1929, the West Lake Exposition was held. The exposition showcased Chinese merchandise and culture—particularly those of Hangzhou and Jiangnan—to a global audience. The event included patriotic education and the dissemination of political messages through its Revolutionary Memorial Hall, Revolutionary Memorial Tower, and Revolutionary Memorial Hall Library.

In March 1937, Zhou Enlai and Chiang Kai-shek held a secret meeting at Yanxia Cave near the lake to negotiate a coalition against Japan during the Second Sino-Japanese War.

The Japanese seized Hangzhou in December 1937. Under Japanese rule, deforestation of the mountains surrounding West Lake led to rapid silting of the lake from soil erosion, due to a lack of maintenance. A Japanese shrine was built by the lake in October 1939, intended as a site for celebrations of the Japanese mid-autumn festival to familiarise the city's Chinese citizens with Shintoism. With the Japanese surrender in 1945, tourism at West Lake flourished once again, although the city itself faced severe economic challenges due to hyperinflation.

The Communists took Hangzhou shortly after the Nationalist retreat from the city to preserve West Lake's cultural relics in 1949. In the 1950s, major hydrological works, along with other construction projects, took place, to exemplify socialist achievements. Hangzhou Botanical Garden and a flower garden was opened on the lake's west shore. The parks of Fish Viewing at the Flower Pond and Orioles Singing in the Willows were constructed. Lingyin Temple, Jingci Temple, Yue-Wang Temple, Three Ponds Mirroring the Moon, Mid-Lake Pavilion and other spots were renovated.

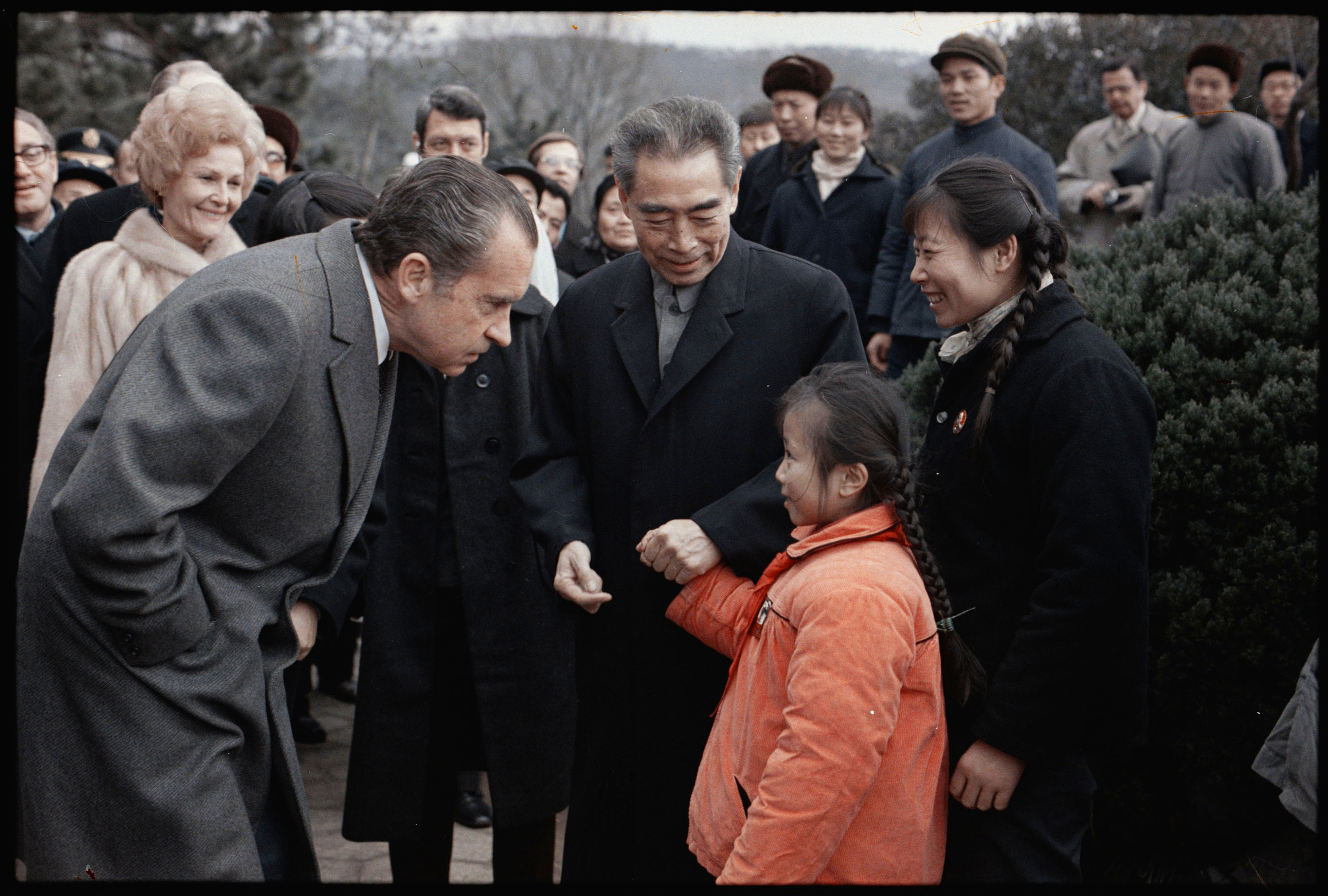
U.S. President Richard Nixon at West Lake in 1972

Since 1953, Chairman of the Chinese Communist Party Mao Zedong stayed periodically at West Lake every year until his death in 1976. To ensure his safety, the local government forcibly relocated residents suspected of connections with the Nationalists to labour camps. Shops near the lake were acquired by the state, and undercover security personnel were stationed at over 100 shops in the area. The tombs of notable figures—including Wu Song, Fang La, Yu Qian, Zhang Cangshui, Su Manshu, Su Xiaoxiao, and the Stuart family—as well as the temples of Yue Fei and Wen Tianxiang, were damaged or destroyed. During the Cultural Revolution (1966–1976), Liutong Temple and another temple were destroyed. Chinese Premier Zhou Enlai ordered the closure of the Lingyin Temple to prevent it from being damaged, but repairs were later made to many scenic sites, due to the visits by the exiled Cambodian prince Norodom Sihanouk in 1971 and the American president Richard Nixon in 1972.

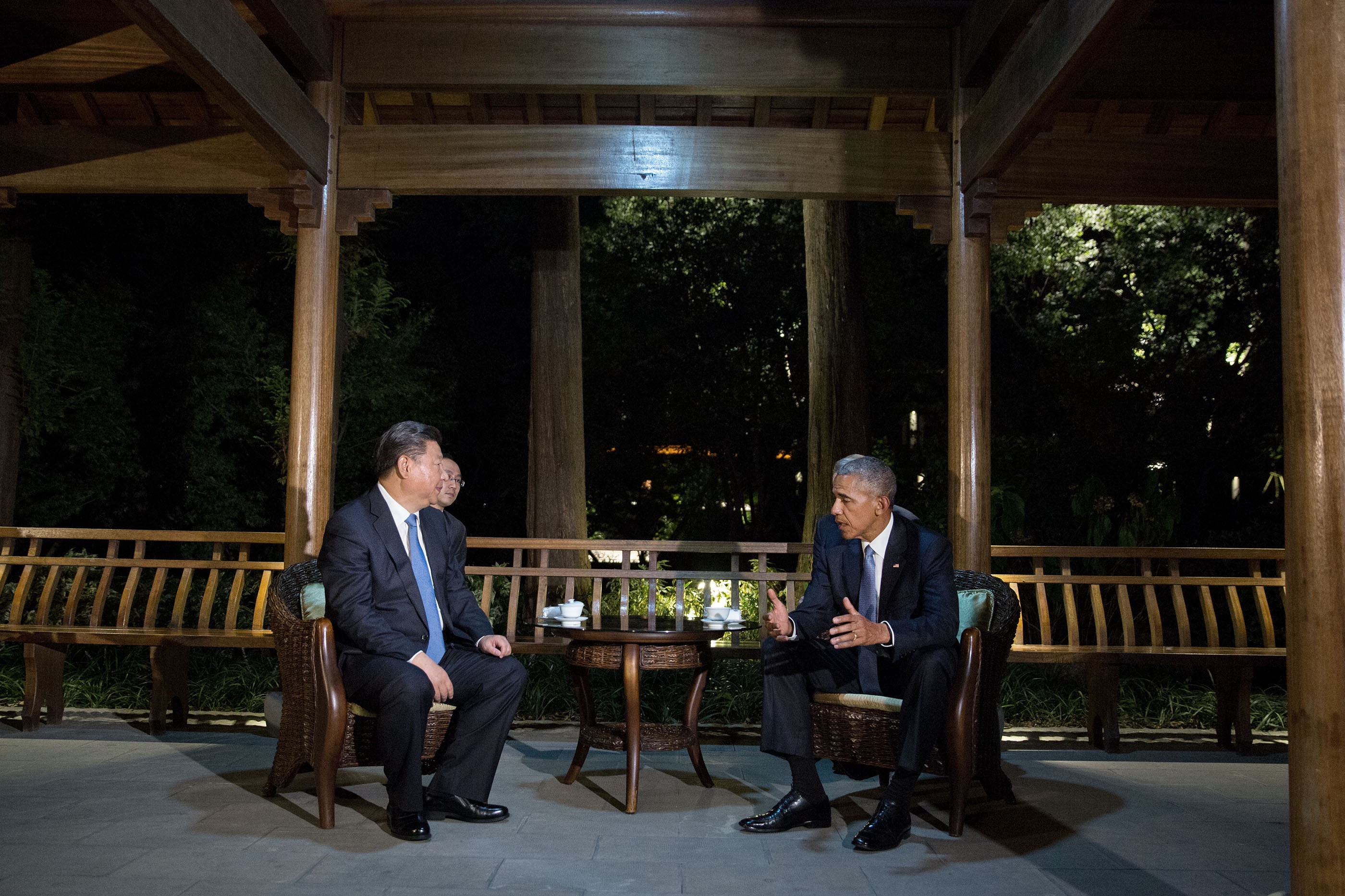
Barack Obama and Xi Jinping at the West Lake State House in 2016

After 1976, tourism to the lake revitalised. In 1983, the Hangzhou government refurbished temples and pavilions upon the lake. They also expanded Galloping Tiger Spring and established Curved Yard and Lotus Pool in Summer Park. The new site Exploring Plum Blossoms at Ling Peak was introduced, complemented by cultural events at Huanglong Cave and Ruan Gong Islet. In 1984, local media and societies held public vote to select the new "Ten Scenes" of the lake. In 1985, a pump at Zhakou to draw 300,000 cubic meters of water daily, were built to refresh the water in the lake. A sewage interception project, completed in 1981, installed over 17 kilometres of buried tunnels and 10 pumping stations. In 2000, the West Lake exposition was relaunched, drawing 1.4 million visitors. In 2002, Leifeng Pagoda was rebuilt where it collapsed in 1924. During the 2016 G20 Hangzhou summit and the 2023 Asian Games, West Lake State Guest House was where General Secretary of the Chinese Communist Party Xi Jinping met with foreign guests, such as Barack Obama and Narendra Modi.

== General layout ==
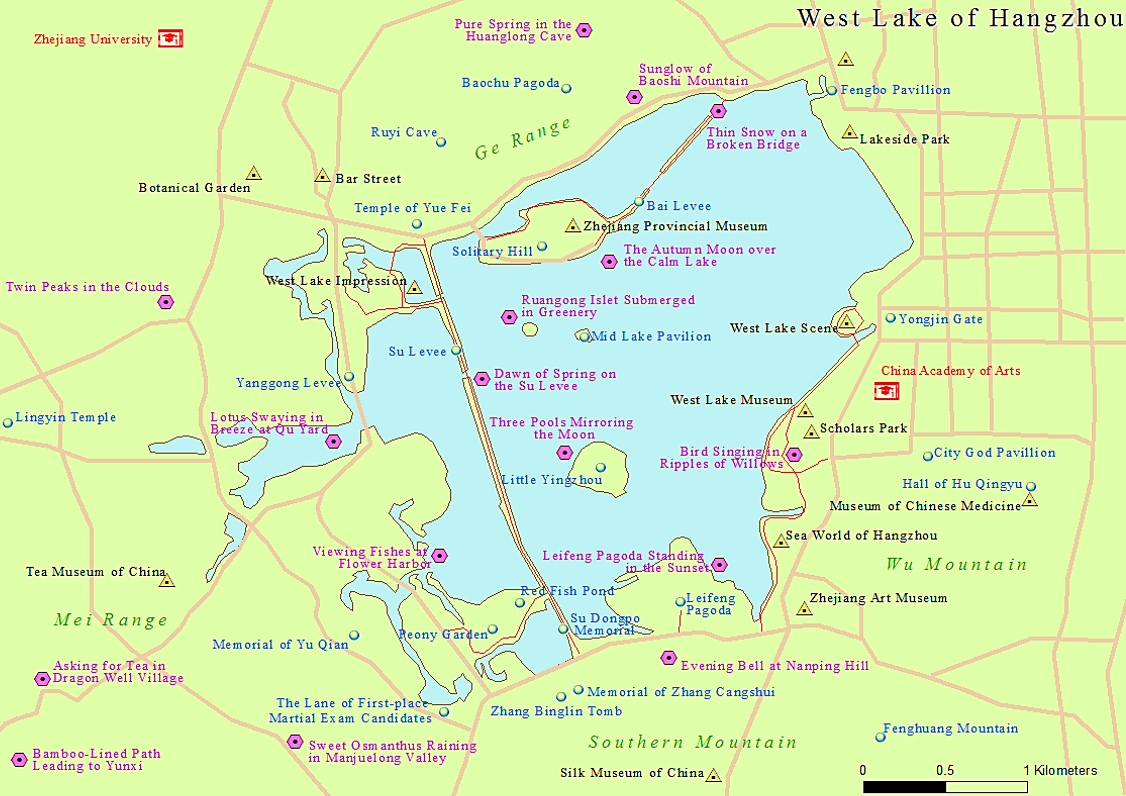
Map of West Lake

The layout of West Lake features "one hill, two pagodas, three islets, four causeways and five lakes." Among them, ten classic scenic places are collectively known as the "Ten Scenes of West Lake".

=== Gushan ===
Gushan (孤山), literally "Orphan" or "Solitary Island", is the only natural island on West Lake. Connected to the northern shore by Xiling Bridge and Bai Causeway, Gushan and Bai Causeway separate the North Inner Lake from the Outer West Lake. In local folklore, the island is grouped with the Broken Bridge and the Long Bridge as the "Three Oddities of West Lake": the Broken Bridge is not broken, Solitary Island is not solitary, and the Long Bridge is not long. During the Qing dynasty, Gushan became part of a detached palace for emperors visiting Hangzhou. Wenlan Pavilion, the royal library on the island, housed a valuable collection of literary works and rare texts. After the 1911 revolution, the palace grounds were transformed into Zhongshan Park to honor Sun Yat-sen, a key figure in the revolution. The Wenlan Pavilion and other former palace buildings were incorporated into the Zhejiang Provincial Museum, while a new building next to the Pavilion was completed in 1912 to host the Zhejiang Library.

=== Two pagodas ===
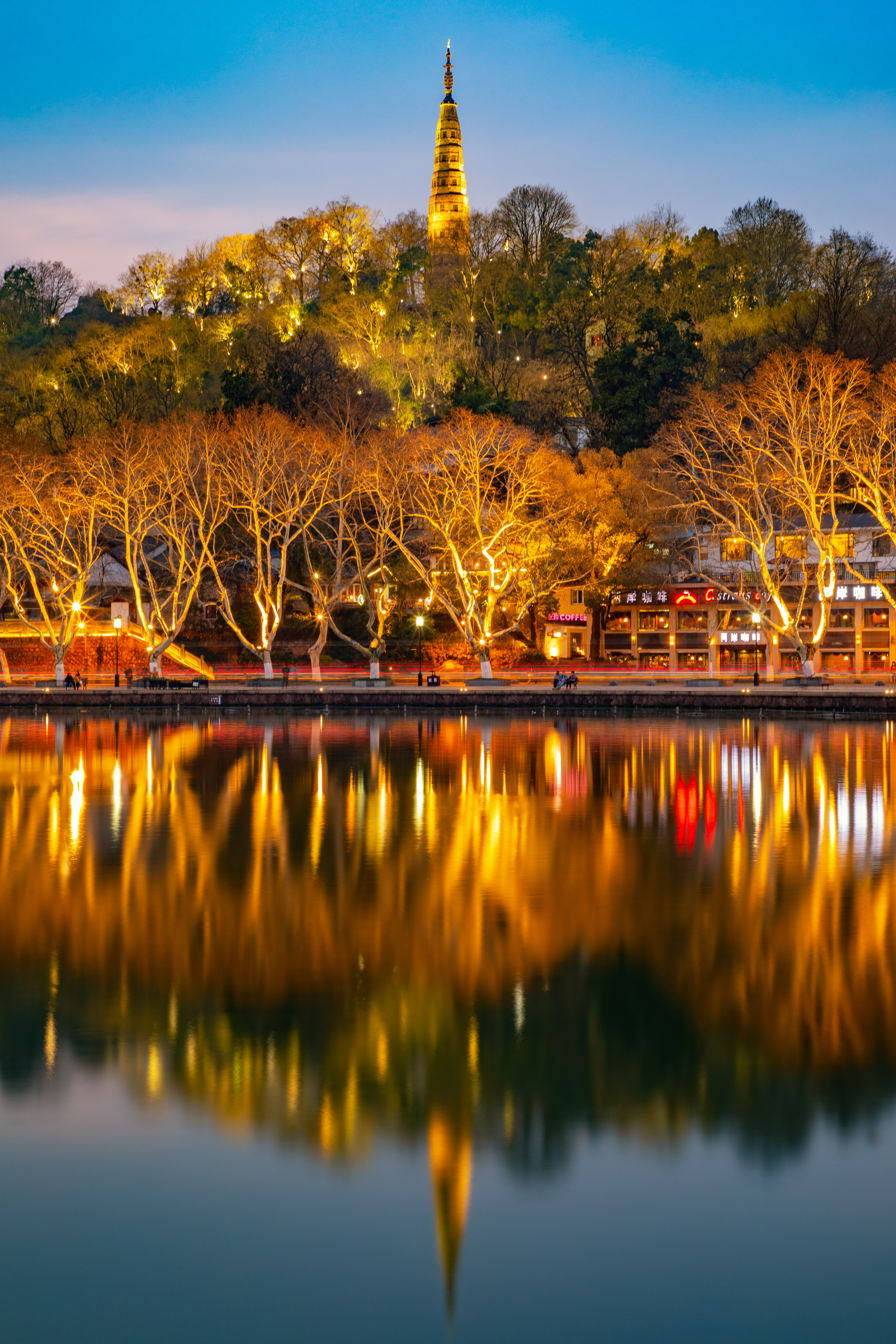
Baochu Pagoda and Beishan Road

Leifeng Pagoda (雷峰塔), originally built in 975, is located on Sunset Hill. According to local tales, it plays a central role in the legend of the White Snake. Leifeng Pagoda was rebuilt in 2002 after the original structure collapsed in 1924, and it remains a popular tourist spot with stunning views of the lake.

Baochu Pagoda (保俶塔), built in 963, stands on Precious Stone Hill. Unlike the more elaborate Leifeng Pagoda, Baochu is a slender, simple structure believed to have been built to pray for the safe return of a local official.

=== Three islets ===
There are three artificial islets on West Lake: Lesser Yingzhou Islet, Mid-Lake Pavilion, and Ruan Gong Islet. Each was constructed during the Ming and Qing dynasties by dredging lake sediment.

- Lesser Yingzhou Islet (小瀛洲), also known as Three Pools Mirroring the Moon, is especially famous for the small stone pagodas that rise from the water around it. During the Mid-Autumn Festival, these pagodas are lit, creating a scene called "Three Pools Mirroring the Moon", which has become one of the "Ten Scenes of West Lake."
- Mid-Lake or Lake-Heart Pavilion (湖心亭), the smallest of the three, is a pavilion surrounded by the Outer West Lake. It is renowned for Zhang Dai's essay on watching the snow from the pavilion.
- Ruan Gong Islet (阮公墩), constructed in 1800, is named after Ruan Yuan, who was the Governor of Zhejiang at the time. Currently, the islet is not open to visitors, as it serves as a natural reserve.

=== Four causeways ===
Three major causeways divide West Lake into five sections, which include:

- Bai Causeway (白堤) – Originally called the White Sand Causeway, it was naturally formed before the Tang dynasty (618–907) and reinforced between 766 and 779. The causeway collapsed during the Yuan dynasty (1271–1368) and was rebuilt in 1589. By the Qing dynasty (1644–1911), the causeway became known as the Bai Causeway in memory of Bai Juyi and by analogy with the Su Causeway.
- Su Causeway (苏堤) – Built in 1089 under the direction of Su Shi during his term as prefect, this causeway, along with six bridges to allow ferry passages, connects Quyuan on the north shore to Huagang on the south shore. It separates the Inner Lake from the outer West Lake.
- Yanggong Causeway (杨公堤) – Constructed in 1508 by local official Yang Mengying (楊孟瑛) to mitigate flooding, this causeway features six bridges that facilitate ferry access between the Inner Lake and the Outer Lake.

Additionally, Zhaogong Causeway (赵公堤), also known as the Jinsha Causeway, was built in 1242, connecting Quyuan to the Su Causeway. It was named after Zhao Yuchou (趙與𥲅), then prefect of Lin'an.

=== Five lakes ===
The current lake, roughly oval in shape, was dredged during past dynasties and spans 3.3 km from north to south, 2.8 km from east to west, with a shoreline circumference of 15 km and a total water area of 5.6 square kilometres. Divided by Gushan Hill, the Su Causeway, and the Bai Causeway, it consists of five distinct water bodies interconnected by bridge arches.

- The Main Lake is bordered by Hubin Road to the east, Su Causeway to the west, Nanshan Road to the south, and Bai Causeway to the north.
- The West Inner Lake lies west of the Su Causeway.
- The North Inner Lake, also known as the Back Lake or the Inner Lake, extends from Duanqiao Bridge in the east to Xiling Bridge in the west, Gushan Hill to the south, and Beishan Street to the north.
- Yuehu Lake is located south of Yue Fei's Temple, west of the Su Causeway, and south of the Breeze-ruffled Lotus at Winding Garden. Sources from the Republic of China era identify it as lying north of the Inner Lake, separated by the Zhaogong Causeway. This lake is likely named after Yue Fei's Tomb, though earlier documentation is unavailable.
- Lesser South Lake lies north of Nanshan Road, west of the Su Causeway, and south of the Viewing Fish at Flowery Pond sight. Republican-era records describe it as situated west of Yinbo Bridge and south of Guanyu Pavilion.

=== Ten scenes ===
Traditionally, there are ten classic scenic spots on West Lake, each remembered by a four-character epithet. Collectively, they are known as the Ten Scenes of West Lake, of which the rating dates back to the Song dynasty. Each is marked by a stele with an epithet written in the calligraphy of the Qianlong Emperor. The ten scenes include:

English translation	Simplified Chinese name	Traditional Chinese name	Description
Spring Dawn at Su Causeway	苏堤春晓	蘇堤春曉	Views of the lake from the centre of the Su Causeway
Breeze-ruffled Lotus at Quyuan Garden	曲院风荷	曲院風荷	Views of gardens with lotus at north end of the Su Causeway during the summer
Autumn Moon over the Calm Lake	平湖秋月		Views from the northeast of the main lake toward the three islands, with hills to the west, south, and east sides of West Lake
Lingering Snow on Broken Bridge	断桥残雪	斷橋殘雪	View toward the Broken Bridge at the eastern end of Bai Causeway, extending westward beyond.
Leifeng Pagoda in Evening Glow	雷峰夕照		Leifeng Pagoda, or the Leifeng Hill where the pagoda stands, in the sunset
Three Ponds Mirroring the Moon	三潭印月		Three small stone pagodas near the artificial island of Lesser Yingzhou, with lanterns that reflect on the lake's surface alongside the moonlight
Listening to Orioles at Willow Waves	柳浪闻莺	柳浪聞鶯	Originally a royal garden of the Song dynasty, a park filled with willows swaying with the wind and singing birds
Twin Peaks Piercing the Clouds	双峰插云	雙峰插雲	On rainy or misty days, parts of the South and North Peaks seem to emerge and disappear within the clouds, with their tops still visible above the mist
Viewing Fish at Flower Pond	花港观鱼	花港觀魚	Views of ponds with goldfish in a floral garden between the Small South Lake and Inner West Lake in the west.
Evening Bell Ringing at the Nanping Hill	南屏晚钟	南屏晚鐘	The sound of bells at the Jingci Temple at the Nanping Hill.

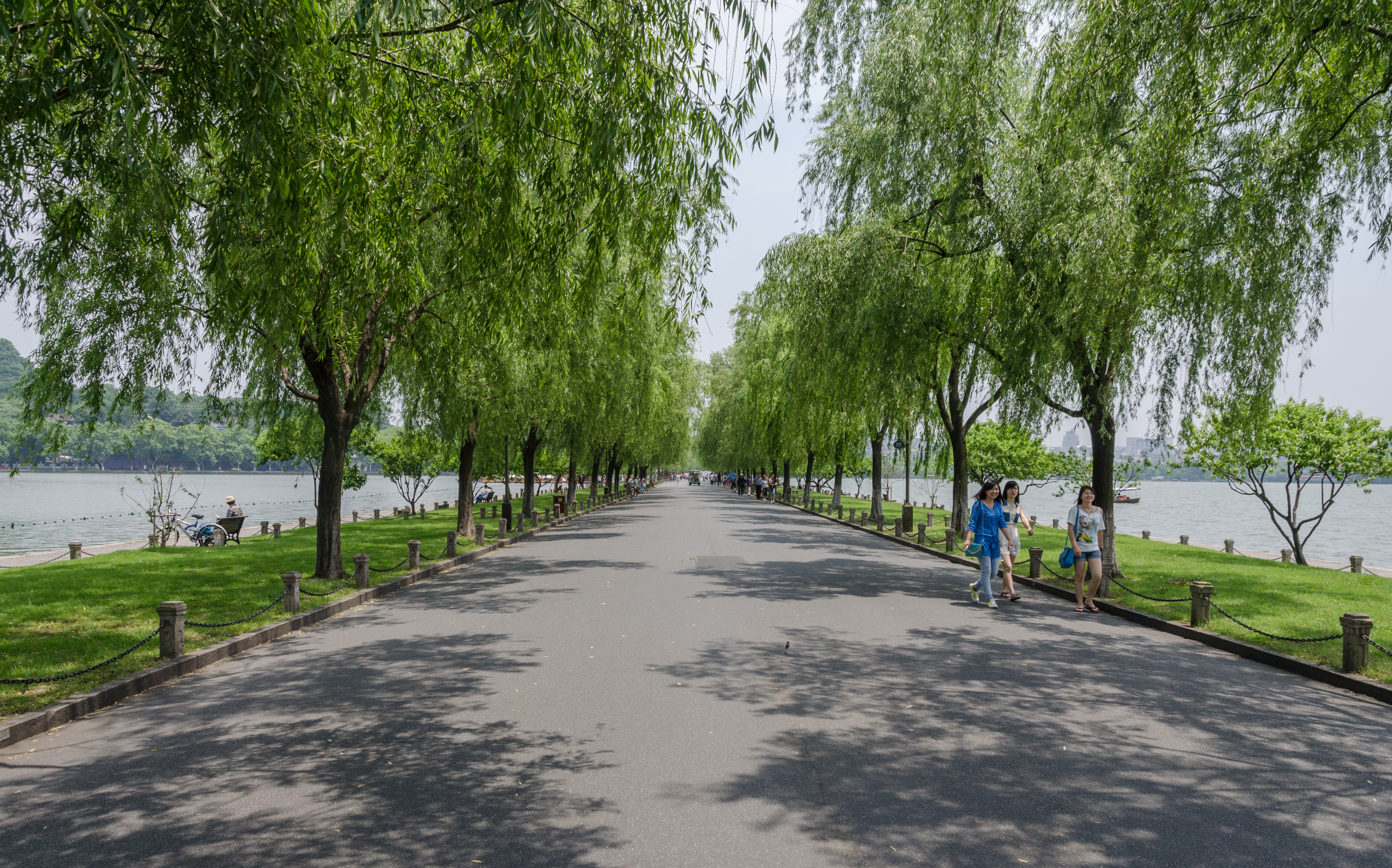
Spring Dawn at Su Causeway

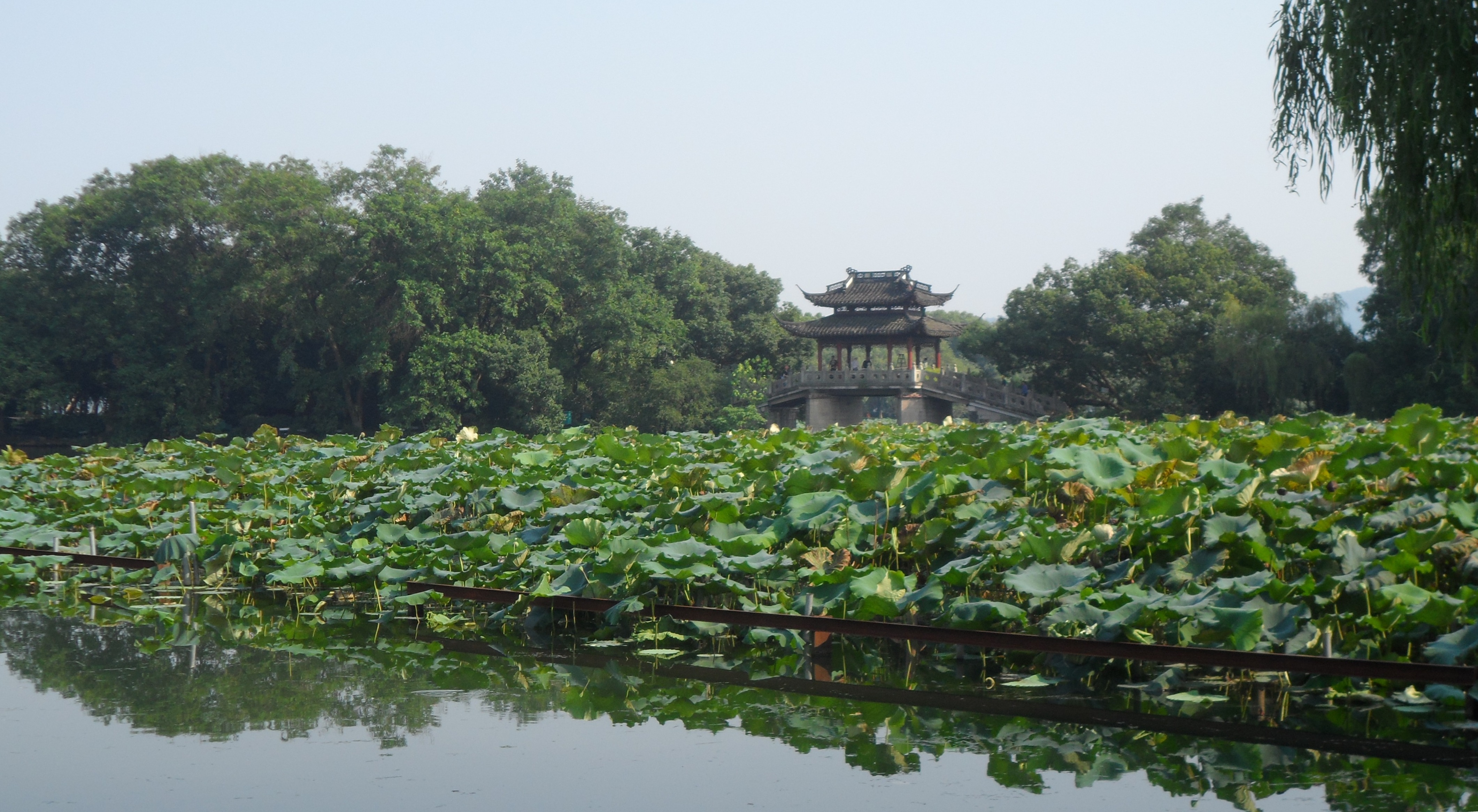
Breeze-ruffled Lotus at Quyuan Garden

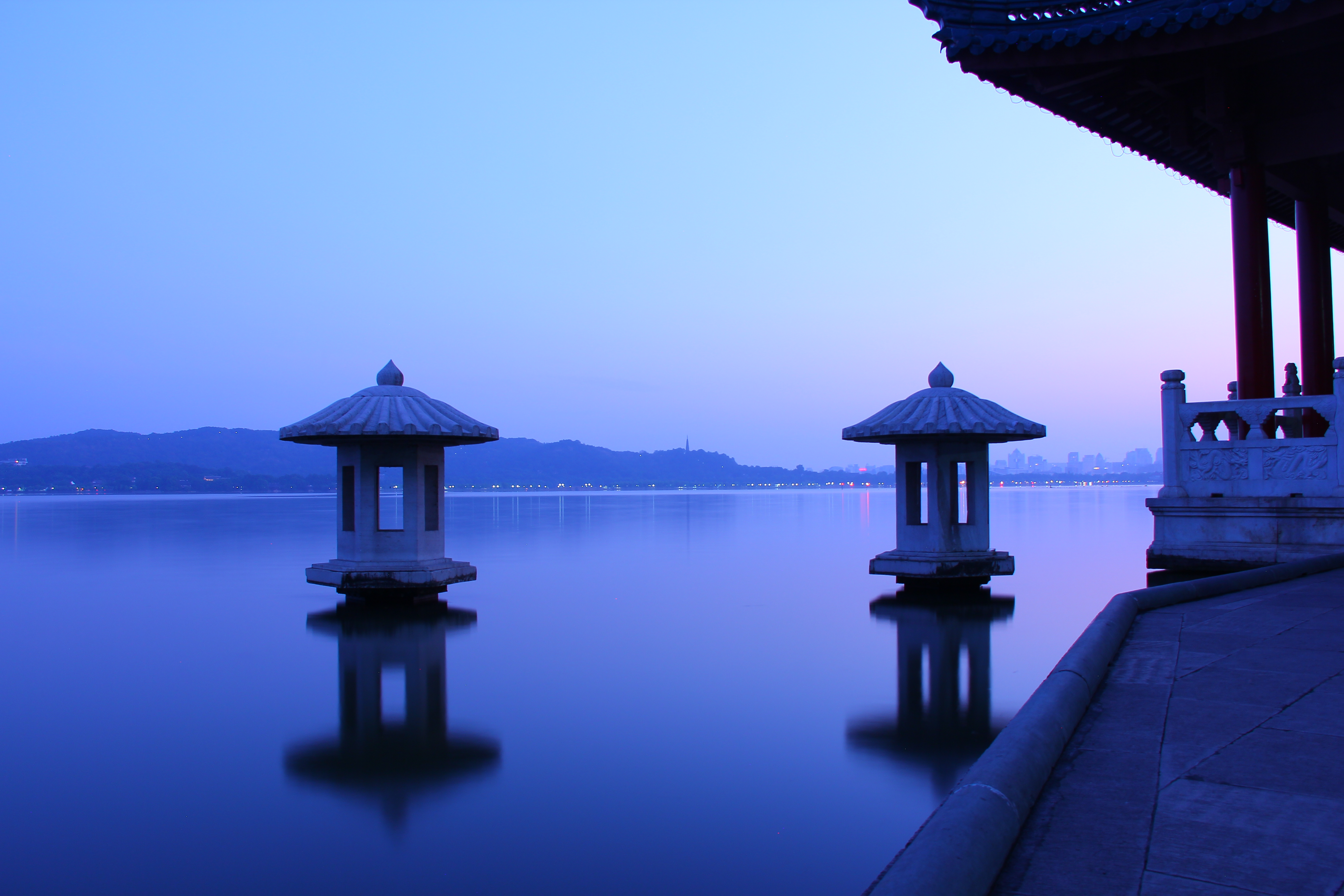
Autumn Moon over the Calm Lake

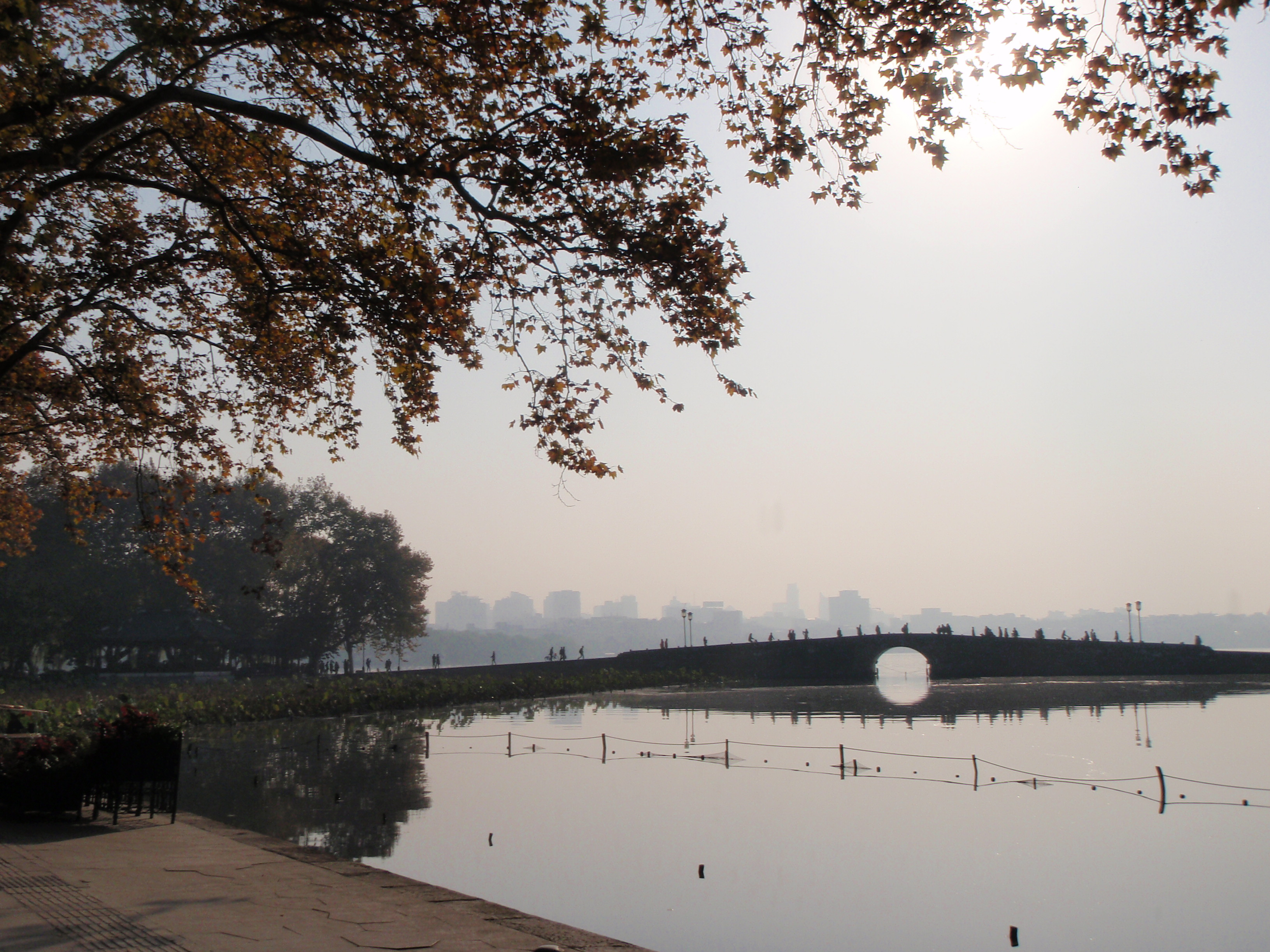
Lingering Snow on Broken Bridge

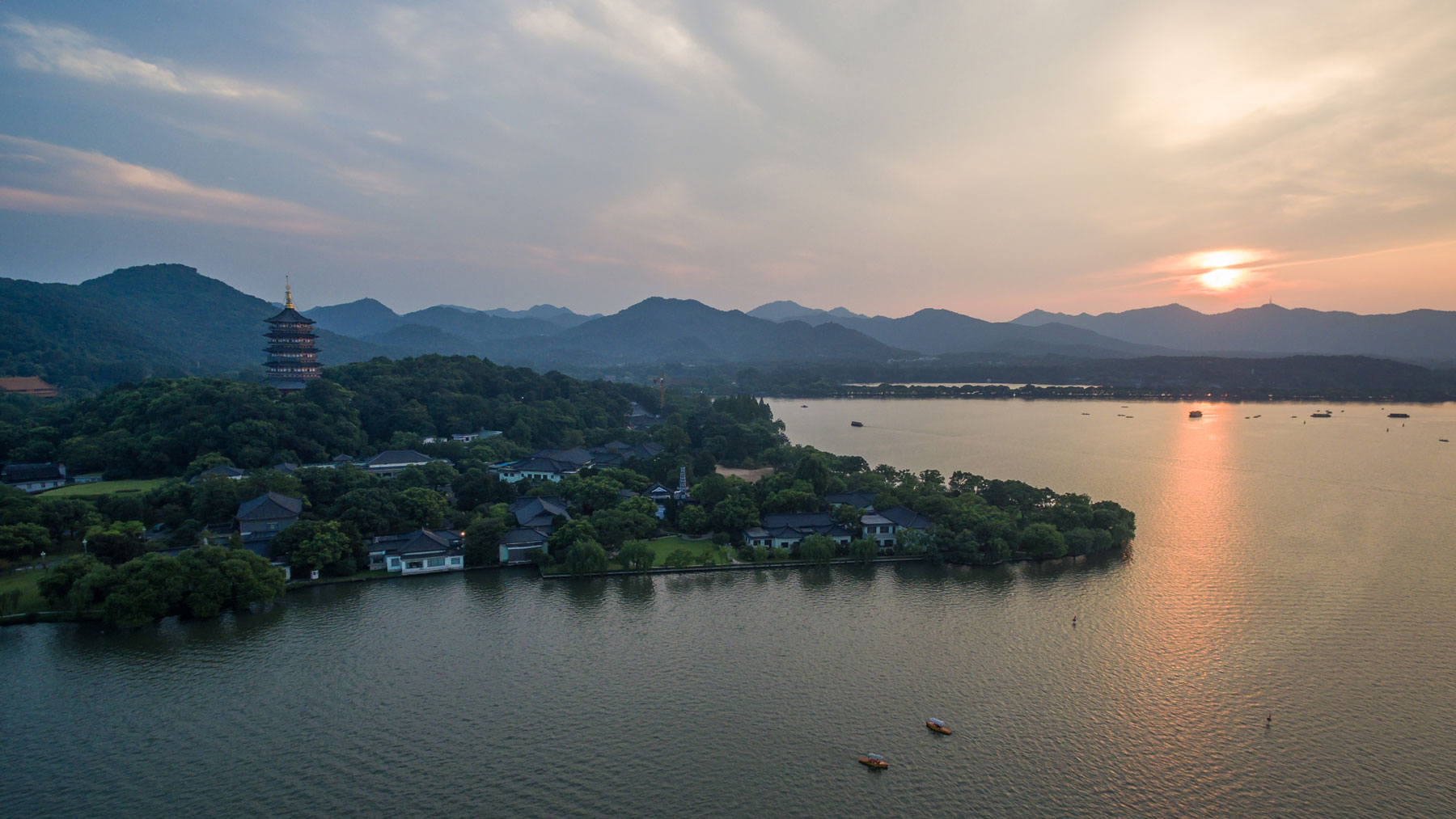
Leifeng Pagoda in Evening Glow

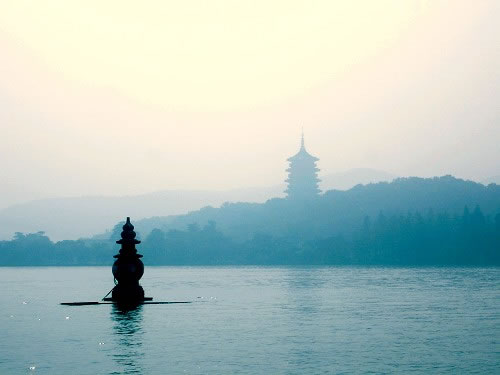
Three Ponds Mirroring the Moon

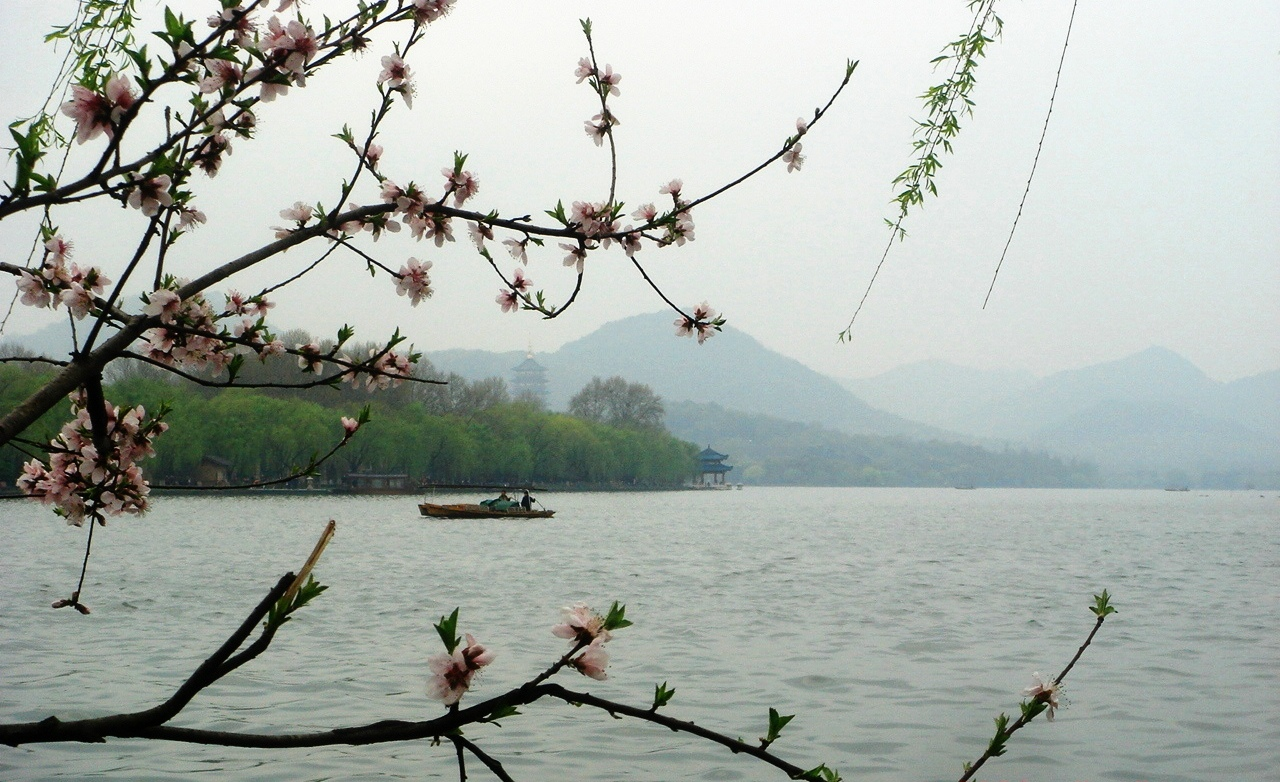
Listening to Orioles at Willow Waves

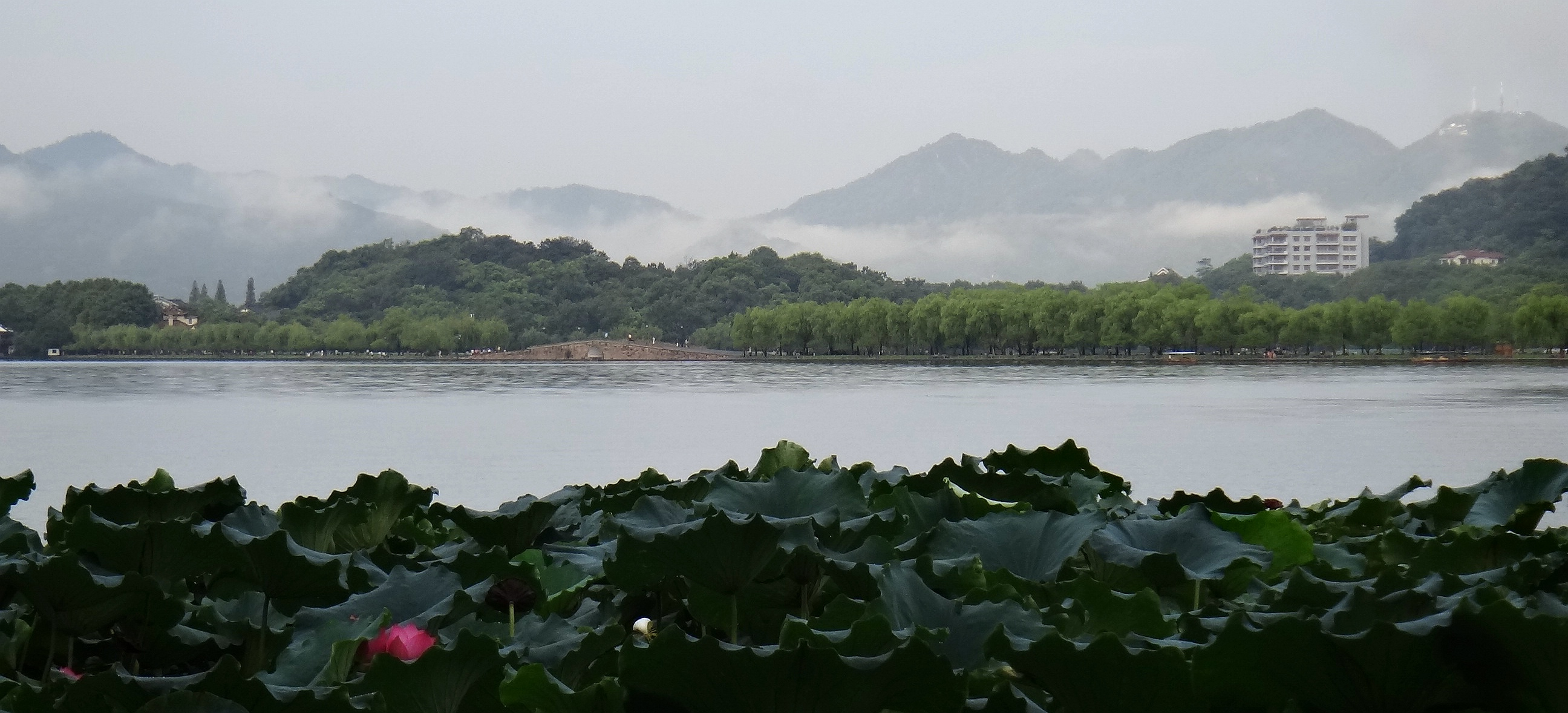
Twin Peaks Piercing the Clouds

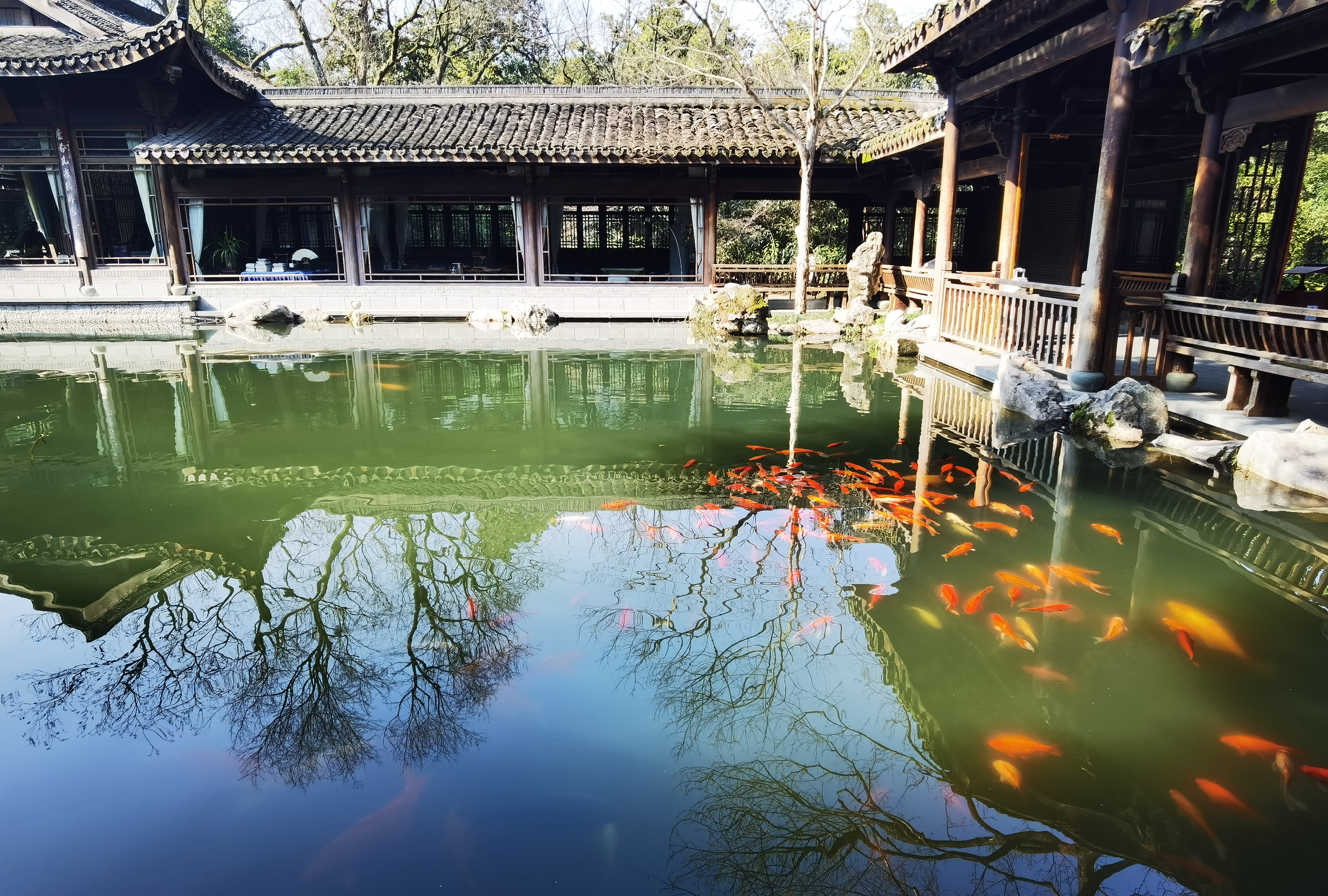
Fish Viewing at the Flower Pond

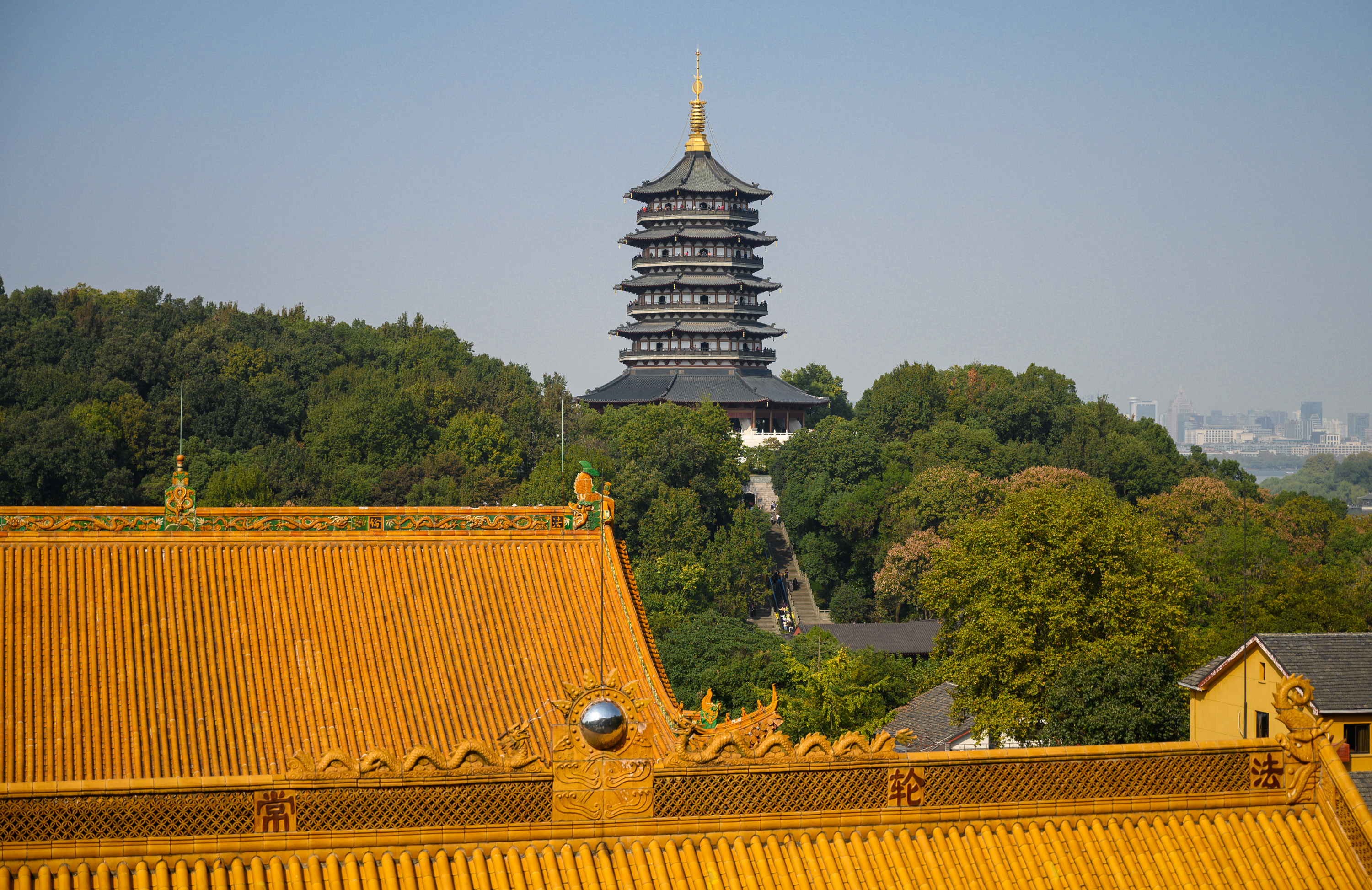
Evening Bell Ringing at the Nanping Hill

== Architecture ==
=== Temples and monasteries ===
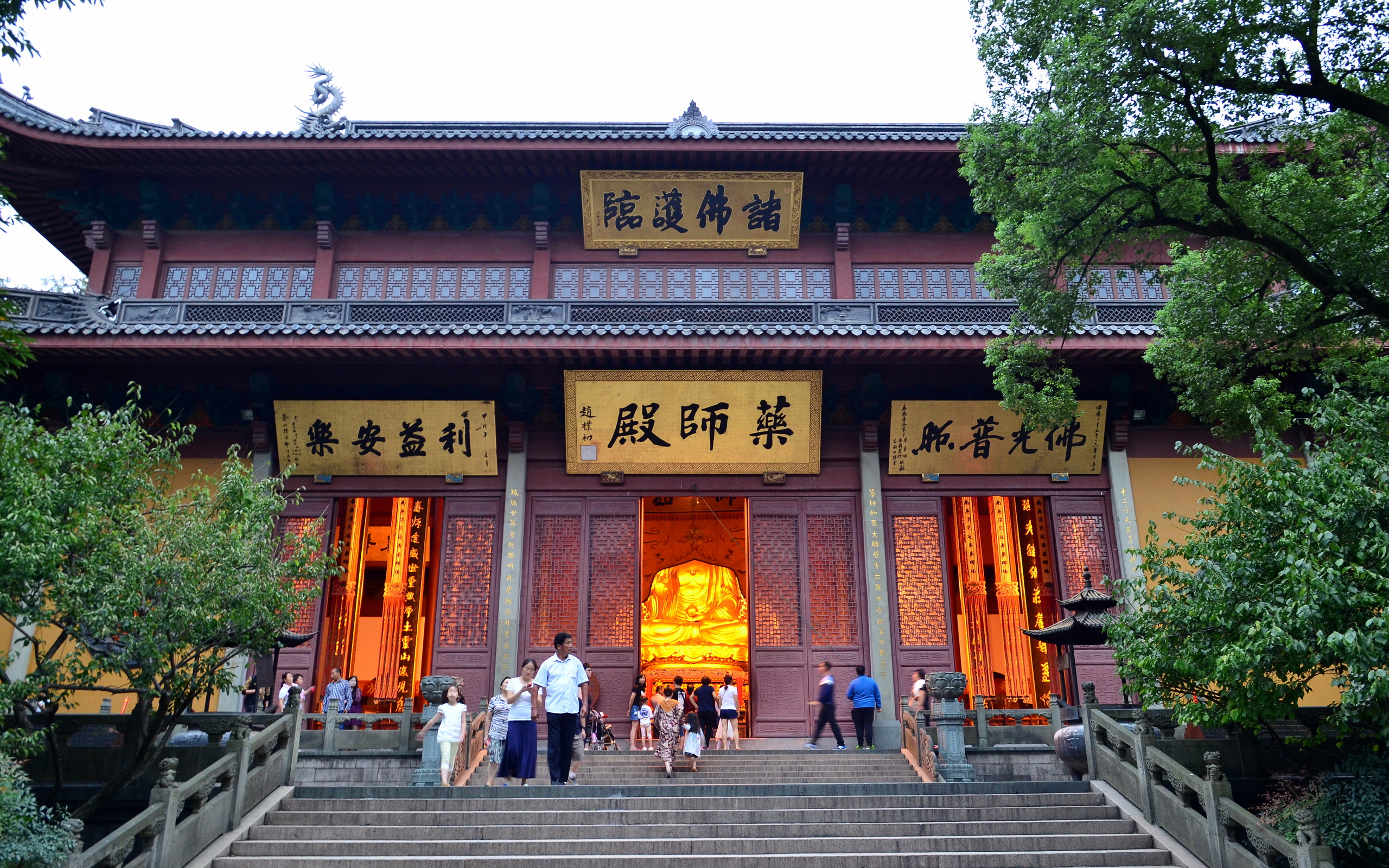
Lingyin Temple

Buddhism's roots around West Lake extend back to the 4th century with the establishment of Lingyin Temple and Tianzhu Temple. During the Five Dynasties period (907–960), the Wuyue rulers, who were devoted Buddhists, initiated extensive temple construction in the region. Notable temples from this period include Jingci Temple on Nanping Hill, Yunqi Temple in Fan Village, and Shangtianzhu Temple on Tianzhu Hill. In addition to these temples, pagodas such as Liuhe, Leifeng, and Baochu were erected, along with intricate stone Buddhist carvings in Yanxia Cave, Shiwu Cave, and on Feilaifeng Peak. During the Song Dynasty, Lingyin Temple and Jingci Temple gained recognition as two of the "Five Mountains and Ten Temples." Across the West Lake Scenic Area, there are 30 Buddhist sites officially designated as protected heritage sites. The Baopu Taoist Monastery, rebuilt in the 17th century, enshrines Ge Hong, a prominent Taoist scholar, alchemist, and medical scientist, who conducted Taoist practices and alchemical experiments on Geling Ridge near West Lake.

=== Tombs and memorial halls ===
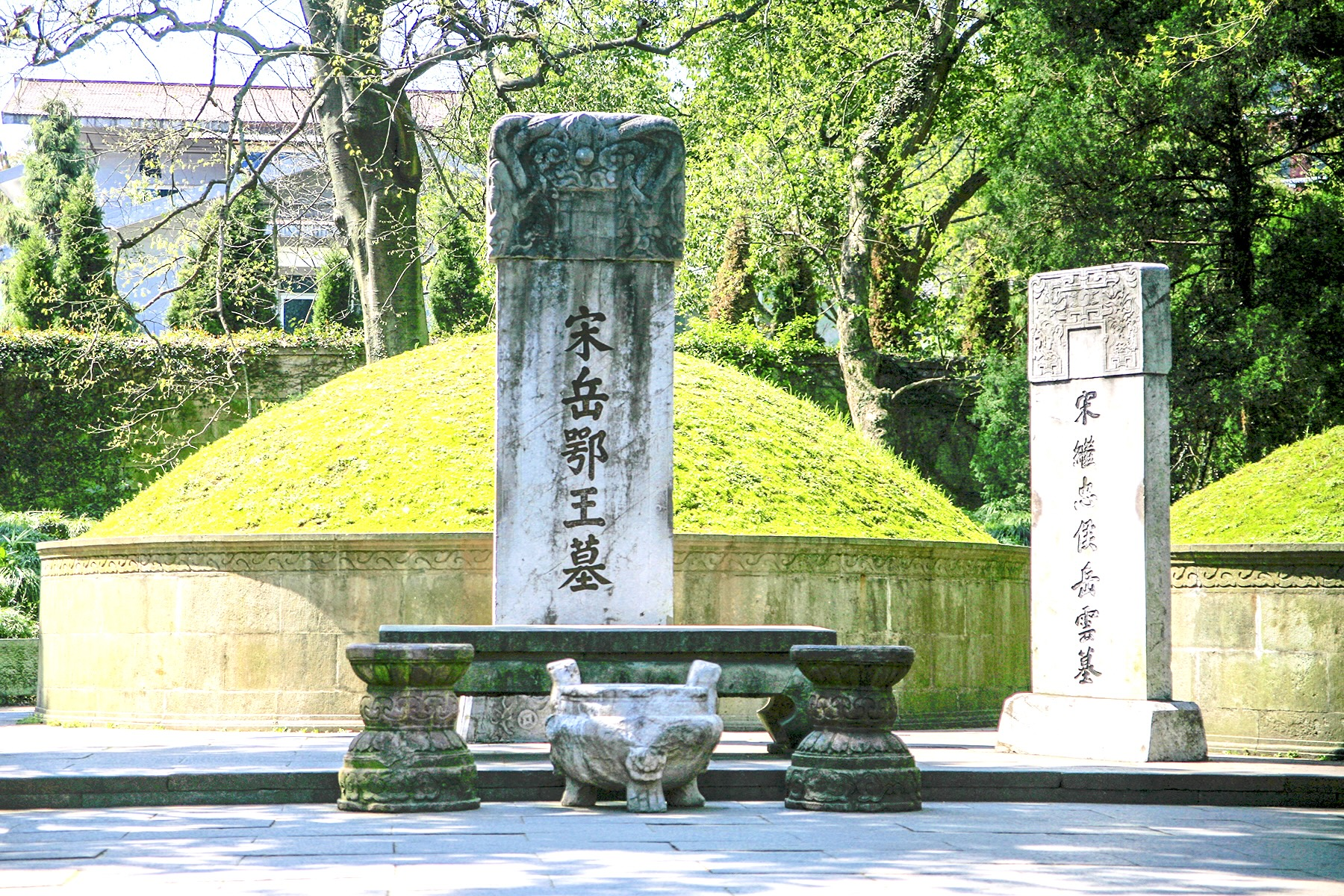
Tombs of Yue Fei and Yue Yun

Yue Fei's Tomb and Temple serve as a memorial to Yue Fei, a legendary figure in Chinese history known for his loyalty and filial piety. Built in 1163, the tomb honours Yue Fei as a national hero and epitomises the Confucian values that have deeply influenced Chinese society for centuries. Tomb of Su Xiao Xiao is located near the Xiling Bridge on West Lake's north bank.

=== Pavilions and monuments ===
Wenlan Pavilion, built in 1784 and rebuilt in 1880, was the only one that exists library among the four libraries commissioned by the Qing imperial family for the collection of The Complete Library of the Four Treasuries.

=== Gardens and parks ===
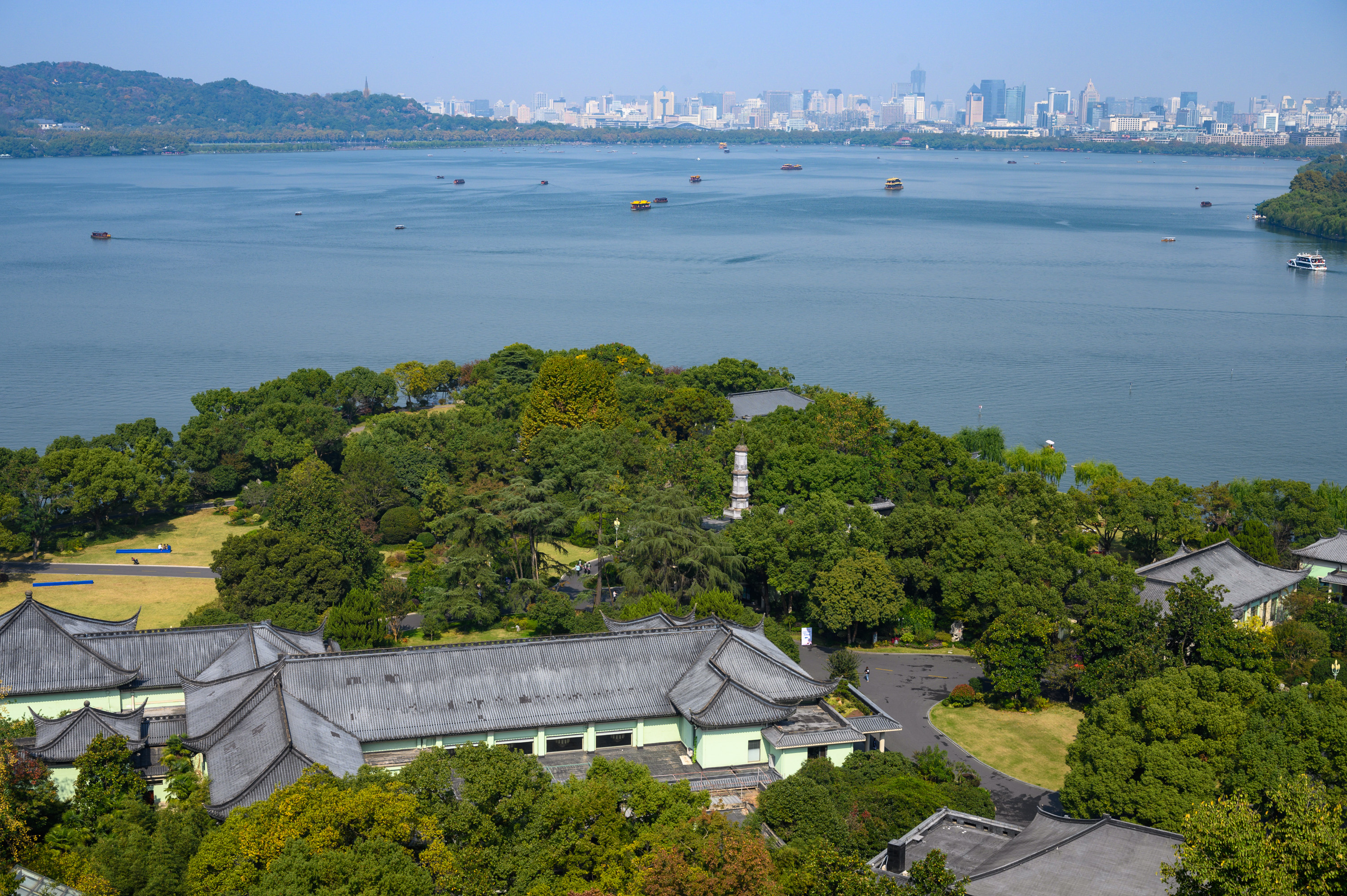
Xizi Hotel

The northeastern shore of West Lake features Hubin Park, a series of six connected parks along the lakefront, surrounded by upscale shopping centers and hotels. At Park No. 3, visitors can enjoy a musical fountain with free performances every evening. To the northwest, Hangzhou Flower Nursery and Hangzhou Botanical Garden showcase a diverse array of flowers and plants. In the southwest, Taiziwan Park and Huagang Park draw visitors in spring with colorful tulips and seasonal blossoms. On the southeastern shore, Liulangwenying Park and Changqiao Park offer scenic views and spaces for relaxation.

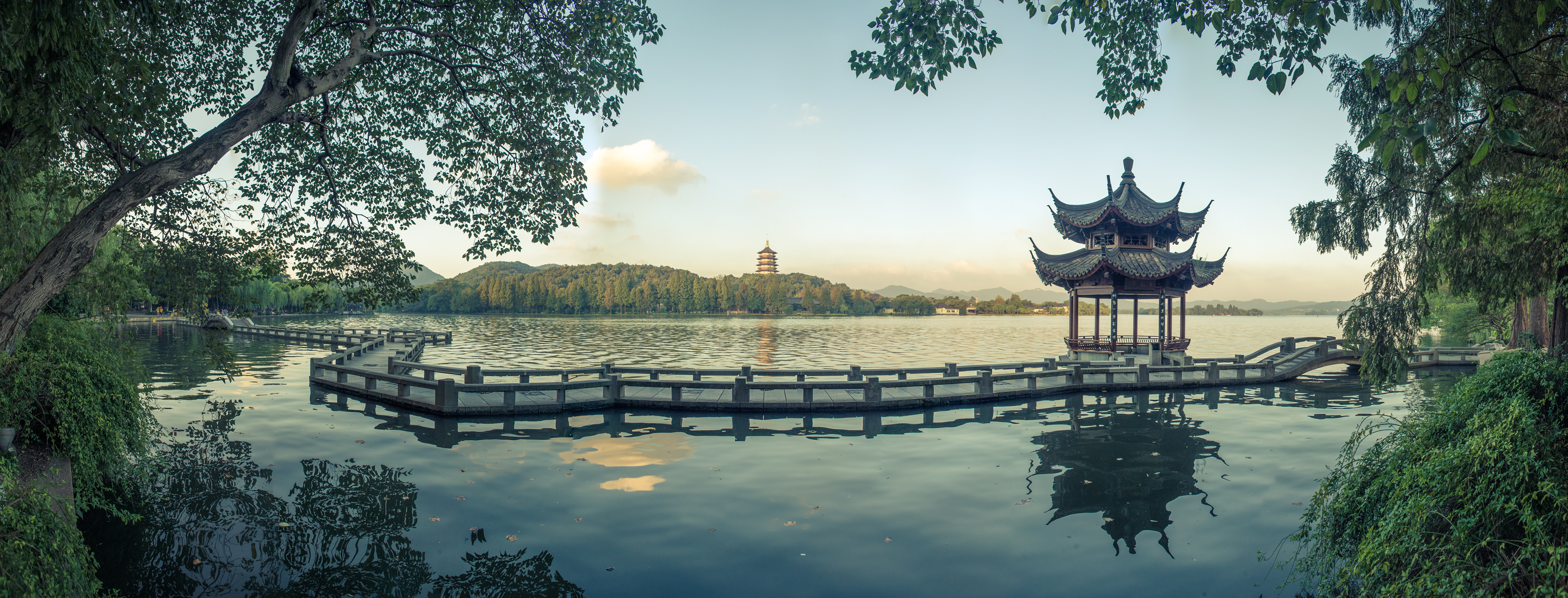
Changqiao Park

Around West Lake, several historic private gardens have been preserved. Liu Villa, on the northwest shore, was originally a private Qing-dynasty garden reflecting classic Chinese landscape design. Today, it serves as the West Lake State Guest House, a luxury hotel known for hosting important events and guests. Wang Villa, on the southwestern corner of the lake, was also built during the Qing dynasty and has since been restored as part of Xizi Hotel. Jiang Villa, on the eastern shore near the Lakeside area, now operates as the Lakeside Tea House. Guo Villa, located on the northwestern shore at the foot of Gushan near Qixia Ridge, is one of Hangzhou's best-preserved Qing-dynasty gardens and is open to the public as a government-run park.

=== Modern architecture ===
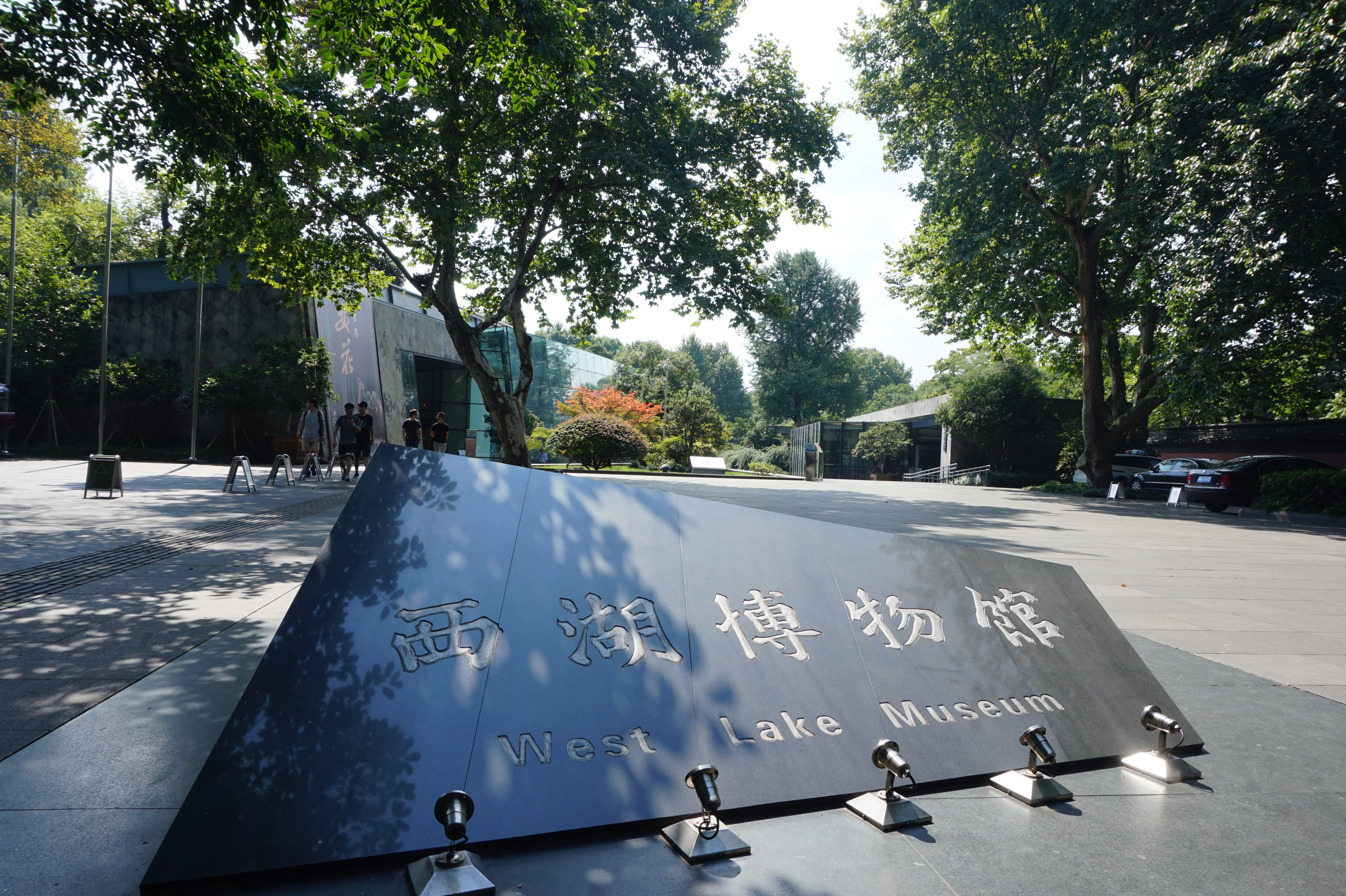
West Lake Museum

West Lake is home to many Western-style residences constructed during the Republic of China era (1911–1949). On Gushan, notable sites include the Memorial Pavilion to Sun Yat-sen, the former residences of Du Yuesheng and Chiang Kai-shek, as well as Yiyunji Lu Villa. Along Beishan Road, significant landmarks feature the Former Residence of Chiang Ching-kuo and various villas such as Run Lu, Ru Lu, Xing Lu, and Baoqing, in addition to notable hotels like Hangzhou Hotel, Xinxin Hotel, and Qiushui Villa. The eastern shore also hosts historic structures including Shihan Jingshe Villa, Long Bridge Villa, Guo Villa, and the former residence of Huang Fu. Modern architecture complements these historical sites, with buildings such as the West Lake Museum and a range of luxury hotels like the Grand Hyatt Hangzhou, upscale shopping centers, such as the Hubin Yintai in77 complex.

== Hydrology ==
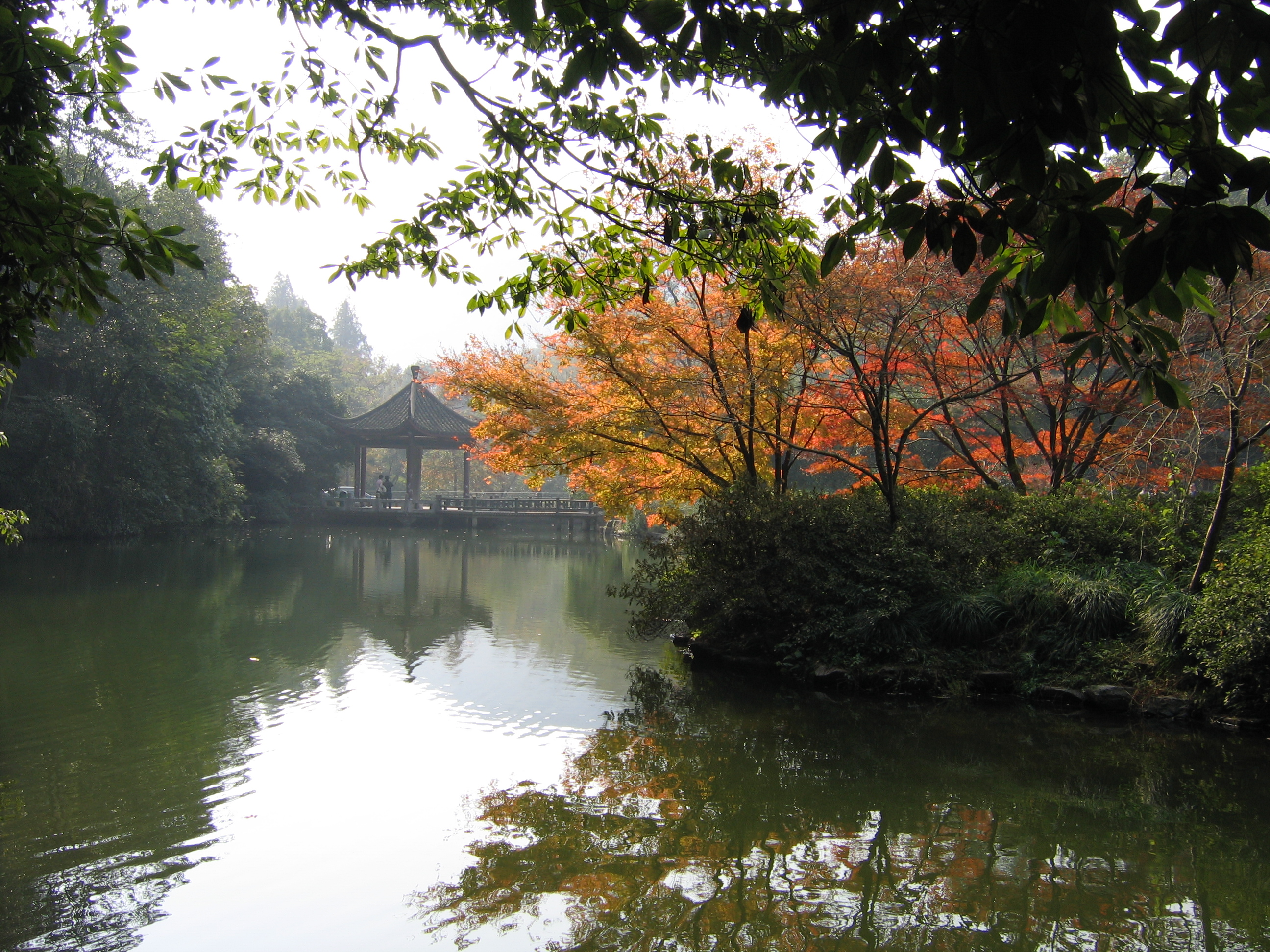
Misty Trees by Nine Streams

With a catchment area spanning 21.22 square kilometers, the lake supports an annual runoff and storage volume of about 14 million cubic meters each. The lake draws around 120 million cubic meters of water annually from the Qiantang River. Natural inflows come from the Jinsha, Longhong, Qishan (also known as Huiyin), and Changqiao streams. The lake's water level is maintained at a consistent Yellow Sea reference level of 7.15 meters, fluctuating by only ±0.05 meters. Seasonal water levels range from a high of 7.70 meters to a low of 6.92 meters, with a variation of approximately 50 centimeters. With a storage capacity of about 14.3 million cubic meters, the lake averages 2.27 meters in depth, reaching a maximum of 5 meters and a minimum of less than 1 meter. Average annual precipitation directly over the lake amounts to 5.63 million cubic meters, while the lake's water system has a scour coefficient of 1.49. During dry seasons, when the reservoir gate is closed, the flow rate drops to zero, and even during the flood season, it rarely exceeds 0.05 m/s.

Located on the southeastern edge of China's hilly regions and the northern boundary of the subtropical zone, West Lake receives an annual solar radiation of 100–110 kcal/cm^{2} and enjoys 1,800–2,100 sunshine hours per year. Due to Hangzhou's mild climate, West Lake seldom freezes during winter. The last complete freezing of the lake occurred in January 1977, when the city experienced extreme cold, with temperatures plunging to a record low of −8.6 °C. Partial and temporary freezing, however, is observed almost annually, contingent on weather conditions.

== Flora ==
West Lake is surrounded by rich and varied vegetation. Within the nominated area, there are 1,369 species of spermatophytes from 739 genera in 184 families, including 28 gymnosperm species from 19 genera in 7 families and 1,273 angiosperm species from 675 genera in 150 families. Additionally, there are 68 species of pteridophytes from 45 genera in 27 families.

=== Seasonal flowers ===
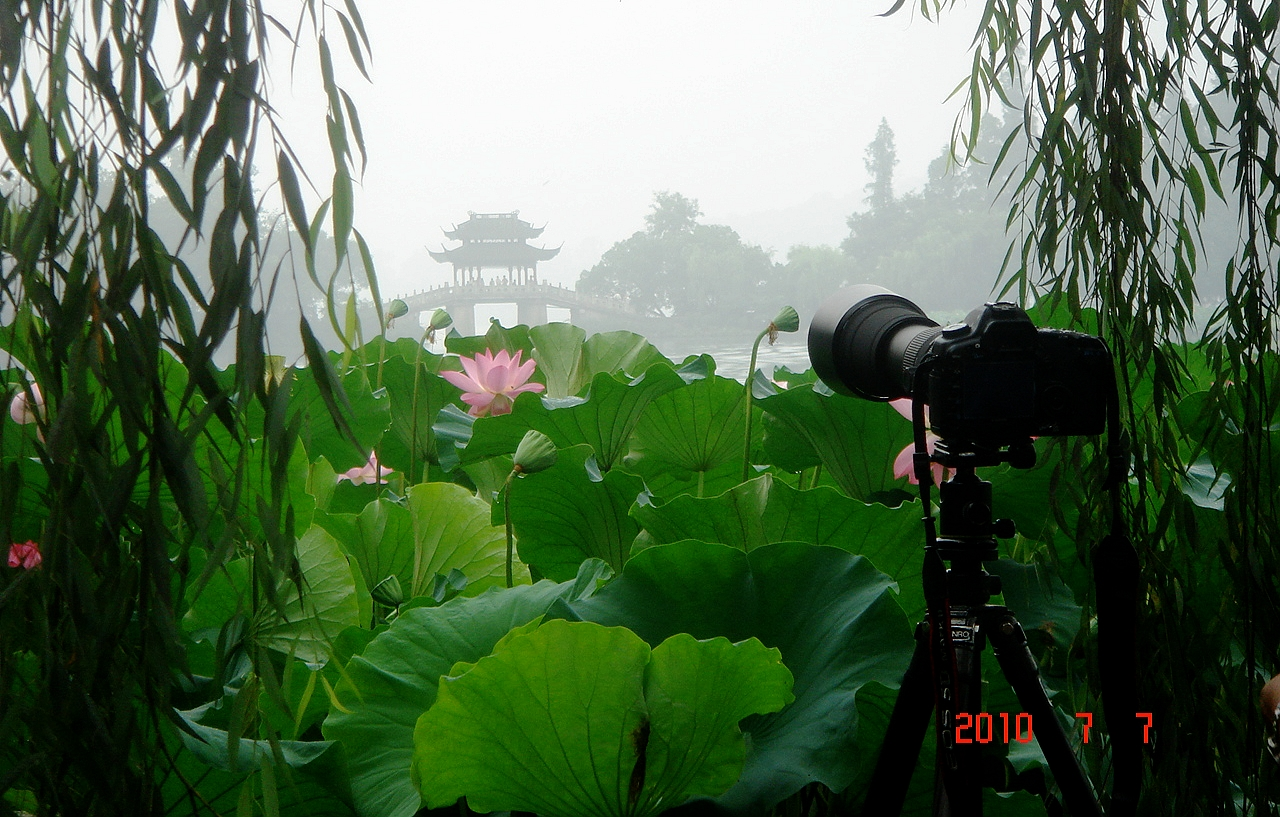
Lotus Flowers upon the Yuehu Lake

The four main seasonal flowers of the West Lake landscape—peach blossoms, lotus flowers, osmanthus, and plum blossoms—are closely connected to Hangzhou's cultural heritage such as the Ten Scenes of West Lake. These plants embody the concept of integrating seasonal beauty into the landscape design of these scenic areas.

- Peach trees and willows line the shores and causeways, adding colour to the lake during spring and early summer. On the Su and Bai Causeways, one willow are typically intercropped with one peach, a pattern designed by Su Shi in the 11th century.
- Lotus flowers are grown in 14 designated areas covering around 20 hectares, primarily found in the North Inner Lake and Yuehu Lake.
- Osmanthus trees are widely planted throughout the gardens along the banks of the lake, with Manjuelong and the Hangzhou Botanical Garden being the most notable spots for their dense plantings and fragrant blooms in autumn.
- The plum blossom, which represents steadfastness and purity in Chinese culture, are grown in Lingfeng Hill, Gushan Hill, and the Xixi Stream.

=== Longjing tea ===
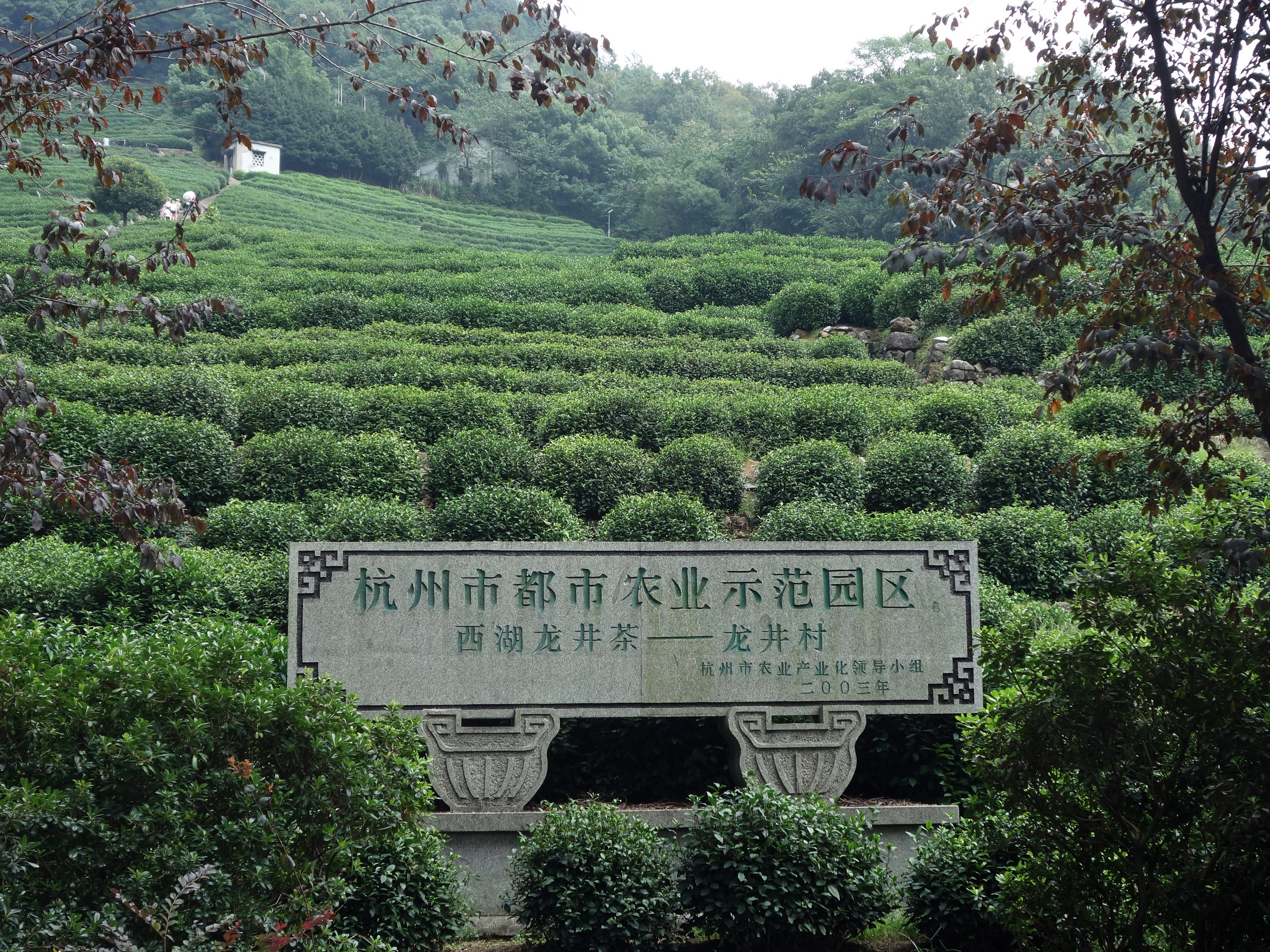
Tea Plantation at Longjing

The Longjing Tea Plantation is nestled in the hills to the west of West Lake and is renowned for producing Longjing tea, a variety that thrives due to the unique geographical conditions of the area. The tea plants are cultivated on the slopes of these hills, arranged on curved or open terraces near brooks in neatly organised plots. This region benefits from a monsoonal humid climate typical of the northern subtropical zone, characterised by distinct seasons, adequate rainfall, and year-round moisture. The plantation's micro-climate, influenced by its location between the Qiantang River to the north and the Jiuxi Streams to the south, creates a foggy and misty environment ideal for tea growth, especially in spring. The surrounding hills, such as Tianzhu Hill and Beigao Peak, protect the area from cold winds, while the valley leading to the Qiantang River draws in humid air, maintaining a warm, wet climate.

=== Ancient trees ===
The area around West Lake also features numerous ancient and rare trees, many associated with historic temples and monasteries such as Lingyin Temple and Tianzhu Temple, as well as Wushan and Gushan Hills. Among these, 125 trees from 22 species are over 300 years old, serving as living records of the region's ecological history.

== Economy ==
According to the Hangzhou Statistical Bureau, in 2017, the West Lake Scenic Area recorded a gross regional product of 112.11 billion yuan (approximately 16.70 billion US dollars). The services sector contributed around 90% of this figure, while manufacturing accounted for roughly 10%, and agriculture contributed less than 0.1%. The GDP per capita for the region was 136,330 yuan (approximately 20,302 US dollars).

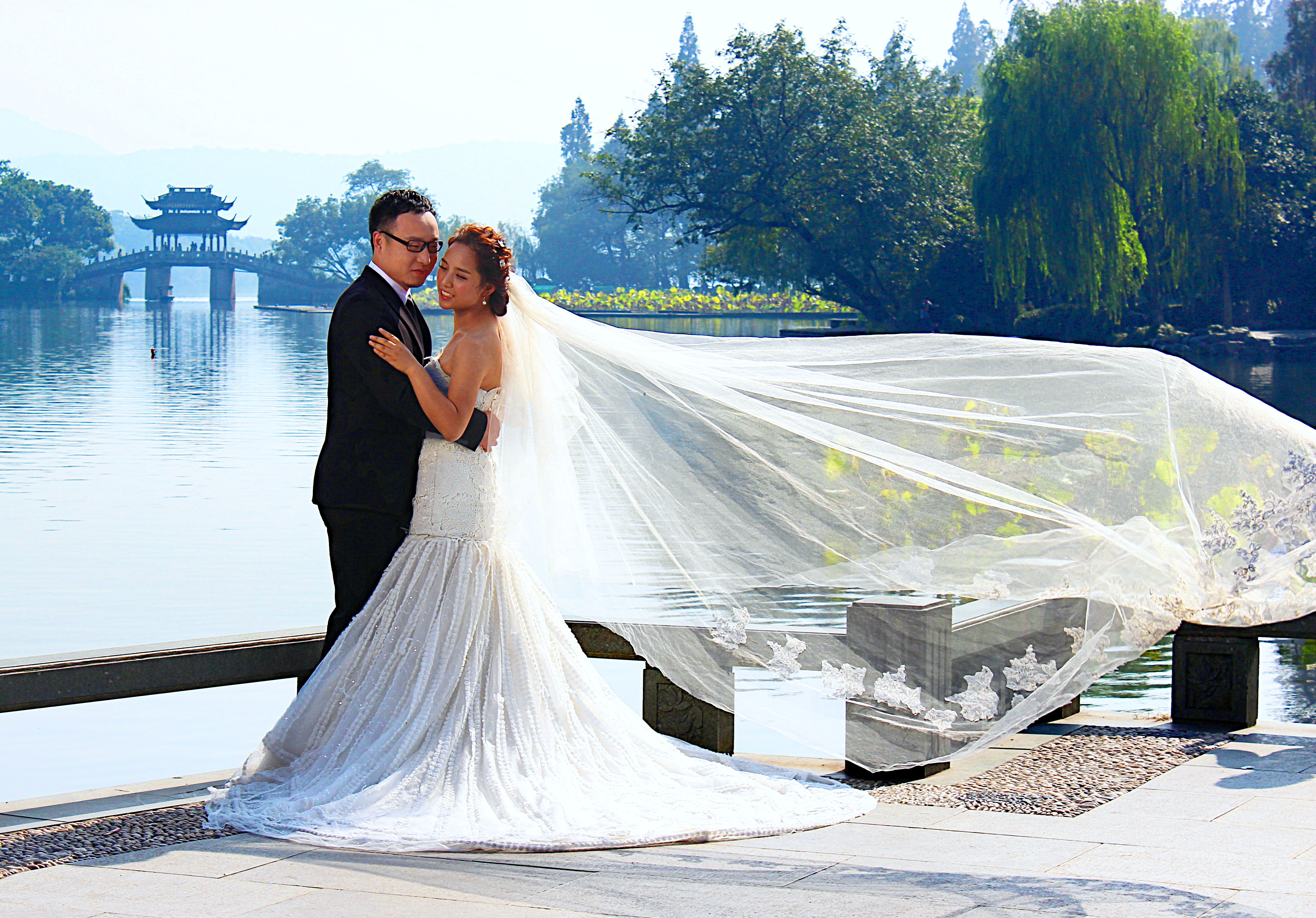
People taking wedding photos by West Lake

=== Tourism ===
Recognised as a National Key Scenic Resort in 1982 and designated a national AAAAA tourist destination in 2006, the West Lake Scenic Area is one of China's most popular tourist attractions and a significant cultural landmark. In 2002, the municipal government removed the park walls, allowing free access to most areas around the lake. This made West Lake the first major tourist destination to eliminate admission fees, with the aim of boosting the sales of nearby restaurants, hotels, and retail stores.

Despite most scenic spots around the lake being free, the non-free scenic spots within the scenic area include Hangzhou Zoo, Hangzhou Botanical Garden, Mulan Mountain Tea Garden, Feilai Peak Scenic Area (with Lingyin Temple inside), Guo Villa, Yue Fei Temple, Yellow Dragon Cave, Liuhe Pagoda Park, Galloping Tiger Park, Bamboo-Lined Path at Yunqi, City God Pavilion, Wansong Academy, Children's Park, the Former Residence of Hu Xueyan and the Leifeng Pagoda.

Each year, the scenic area receive more than 30 million visitors. During public holidays, West Lake is one of the most crowded scenic spots in China. During the 2024 National Day holiday, the area recorded 4.426 million visitors over seven days, representing a 30.92% increase compared to the previous year. Following the free-access policy, the income of the scenic area increased substantially, from 29.4 billion yuan in 2002 to 400.5 billion yuan in 2019. This strategic move contributed to the area's economic resilience during the 2008 financial crisis and the COVID-19 pandemic by reducing dependence on admission fees as a primary source of income.

=== Agriculture ===
Historically, the lake needs to strike a balance between aquaculture and irrigation. By the 6th century, West Lake became an irrigation source, supported by a network of canals aiding rice cultivation. From the 7th century, it provided local residents with fish, aquatic animals (e.g., snails, crabs), and both wild and cultivated plants (e.g., water chestnuts, wild rice shoots), which inspired local cuisine. Absence of intensive management from the government, as seen in the Yuan and Republican era, often led to extensive aquaculture of the lake, while periodic dredging to maintain its irrigation function also temporarily affected habitats and reduced plant food sources. In the 1980s, the annual fish yield peaked at approximately 400 tons but was later reduced to around 250 tons due to regulatory measures aimed at improving water quality.

The Longjing Tea Plantation, situated in the hills west of West Lake, has been a cornerstone of Chinese tea culture for centuries. Longjing tea, a renowned variety of Chinese green tea, is produced from fresh, non-fermented leaves native to West Lake area. Before the anti-corruption movement led by Xi Jinping in 2014, Longjing tea was highly valued and often gifted, at times even surpassing the price of gold. In 2019, the core West Lake production area yielded 502.35 tons, generating a revenue of 3.22 billion yuan (approximately 465.57 million US dollars).

=== Gastronomy ===
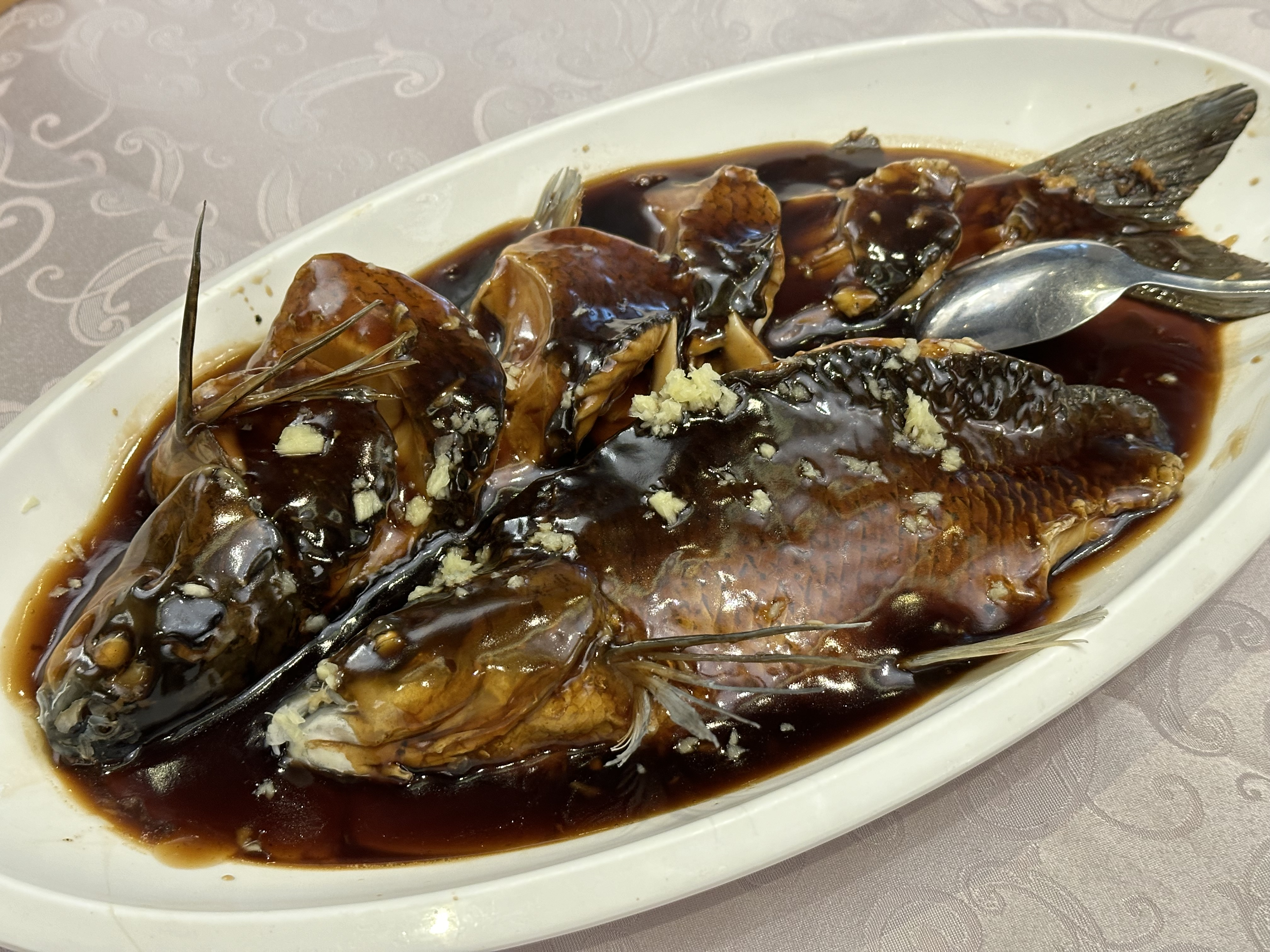
West Lake Fish in Vinegar Gravy

Zhejiang cuisine, one of the eight traditional cuisines of China, is renowned for its light, mild flavours with a hint of sweetness. Thanks to its geographical location, which provides access to an abundance of seasonal ingredients, Hangzhou's branch of Zhejiang cuisine is divided into two main types: lake cuisine and city cuisine. Historically, these types catered to distinguished officials and the broader population, respectively. Lake cuisine emphasises fish, shrimp, and vegetables, while city cuisine uses more commonly available local meats. Signature dishes made from West Lake's freshwater fish and lotus root include West Lake Fish in Vinegar Gravy and Beggar's Chicken. However, despite its rich tradition, Hangzhou's local cuisine faces declining popularity among younger generations. This is attributed to limited options that effectively balance price and taste, earning the city a reputation as a "food desert."

== Culture ==
A Trip to Lake Abundant

I've never traveled to Hangzhou's West Lake
But seem to have met it in my dreams someplace:
A vague and indistinct expanse of water and clouds
Where lotus leaves merge with weeping-willow branches.

— Huang Zunxian (1848–1905), translation by Jerry Dean Schmidt

=== Garden designs ===
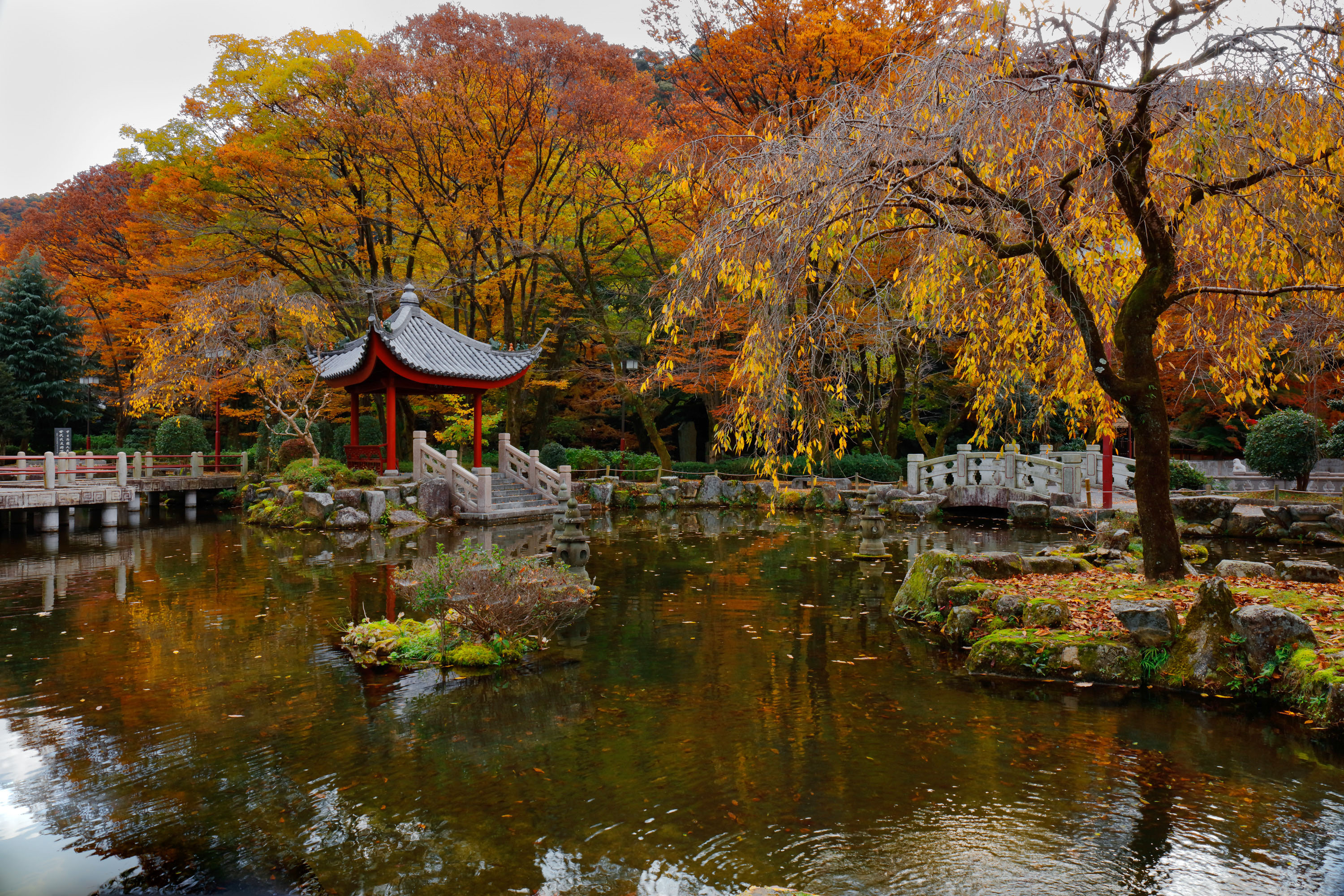
The West Lake as replicated in miniature size in the Japan-China Friendship Garden, Gifu

A human-made landscape, West Lake exemplifies Chinese landscape aesthetics, symbolising harmony between humans and nature as well as the projection of human emotions onto natural scenery. The poetic names create framed views of scenery to be seen from specific locations. West Lake landscape embodies six key elements inspired by Chinese literature:

- Natural hills and waters;
- A spatial arrangement with hills on three sides and the city on the fourth;
- A layout featuring two causeways and three isles;
- The tradition of poetic names for scenic spots;
- Historic monuments and sites;
- Distinctive flora.

Since the Song dynasty, people imitated the views of West Lake in their private gardens, borrowing one or more features of the lake. Such examples include Kunming Lake and the West Causeway at the Summer Palace in Beijing, the Lower Lake at the Summer Retreat in Rehe, the poetic place names at the Kyu Shiba Rikyu Garden and Koishikawa Kōrakuen Garden in Tokyo, Japan. Kintaikyo Bridge in Iwakuni, Japan was inspired by bridges over Hangzhou's West Lake. In 1989, Japan-China Friendship Garden, which involves a miniature replica of West Lake, was built inside the Gifu Park in Gifu, Japan, in memory of the city's friendly tie with Hangzhou since 1979.

=== Fine arts ===
Three Ponds Mirroring the Moon on the Chinese banknote

For centuries, West Lake has also been a prominent theme in East Asian landscape painting, even though many painters may have never seen the lake in person. The State Administration of Cultural Heritage (2011) listed more than 500 paintings and calligraphic works that feature West Lake since the Tang dynasty (618–907), while Japanese paintings of the lake may even outnumber the existing Chinese depictions. In 1928, the National Academy of Art was founded by the lake as the country's first higher education institution in art. As a cultural icon of China, it has been featured on Chinese currency, including the one-yuan banknote in the 1979 Bank of China Foreign Exchange Certificate and the 2005 Renminbi, as well as in the Chinese passport.

Selected art works featuring West Lake
Country	Location	Name	Type	Age	Author
Japan	Ishikawa Prefectural Museum of Art	View of West Lake	Japanese painting	1496	Shūgetsu Tōkan
Japan	Tokyo National Museum	The Scholar Weng Songnian Collecting Water Shields	Chinese painting	17th century	Dou Cishan, Weng Songnian
Japan	Tokyo National Museum	Ten Views of West Lake	Japanese calligraphy	1720	Hosoi Kōtaku
Japan	Tokyo National Museum	West Lake in Spring, High Tide at Qiantang	Japanese painting	18th century	Ike Taiga
Japan	Umi-Mori Art Museum	A fish selling woman and a hermit in West Lake	Woodblock prints	Qing dynasty	N/A
Japan	Edo-Tokyo Museum	The Best Scenic Spot in China, Beautiful Views of West Lake	Printed material	20th century	N/A
Japan	The Museum of the Imperial Collections	Chinese Traditional Arch at West Lake	Oil painting	20th century	Kojima Torajiro
Taiwan	National Palace Museum	Ten Scenes Around West Lake	Chinese painting	13th century	Ye Xiaoyan
Taiwan	National Palace Museum	Ten Scenes from West Lake	Chinese painting	1750	Dong Bangda
Taiwan	National Palace Museum	Imperially Commissioned Set of Ink Sticks with Images and Poems of Famous West Lake Sites	Studio implements	18th century	N/A
Taiwan	National Taiwan Museum of Fine Arts	West Lake, in Hang Jou	Watercolour	1948	Ma Pai-sui
Hong Kong	M+ Museum	West Lake	Photography	1956	Xue Zijiang
Hong Kong	M+ Museum	Mao in a private meditation, West Lake	Photography	1954	Hou Bo
China mainland	10 sites around West Lake	The Imperial Stele of Ten Scenes of West Lake	Chinese calligraphy	1699-1784	Kangxi and Qianlong emperors
China mainland	Liaoing Provincial Museum	Ten Scenes of West Lake	Chinese painting	17th century	Wang Yuanqi
United States	Cleveland Museum of Art	West Lake	Japense painting	mid-1700s	Ike Taiga
United States	The Metropolitan Museum of Art	West Lake, Hangzhou	Chinese sketch	20th century	Xie Zhiliu
United States	The Metropolitan Museum of Art	Jinshan Island and West Lake	Japense painting	1630	Kanō Sanraku
United States	National Museum of Asian Art	Scenic Attractions of West Lake	Chinese painting	14th century	Formerly attributed to Li Song

=== Popular culture ===
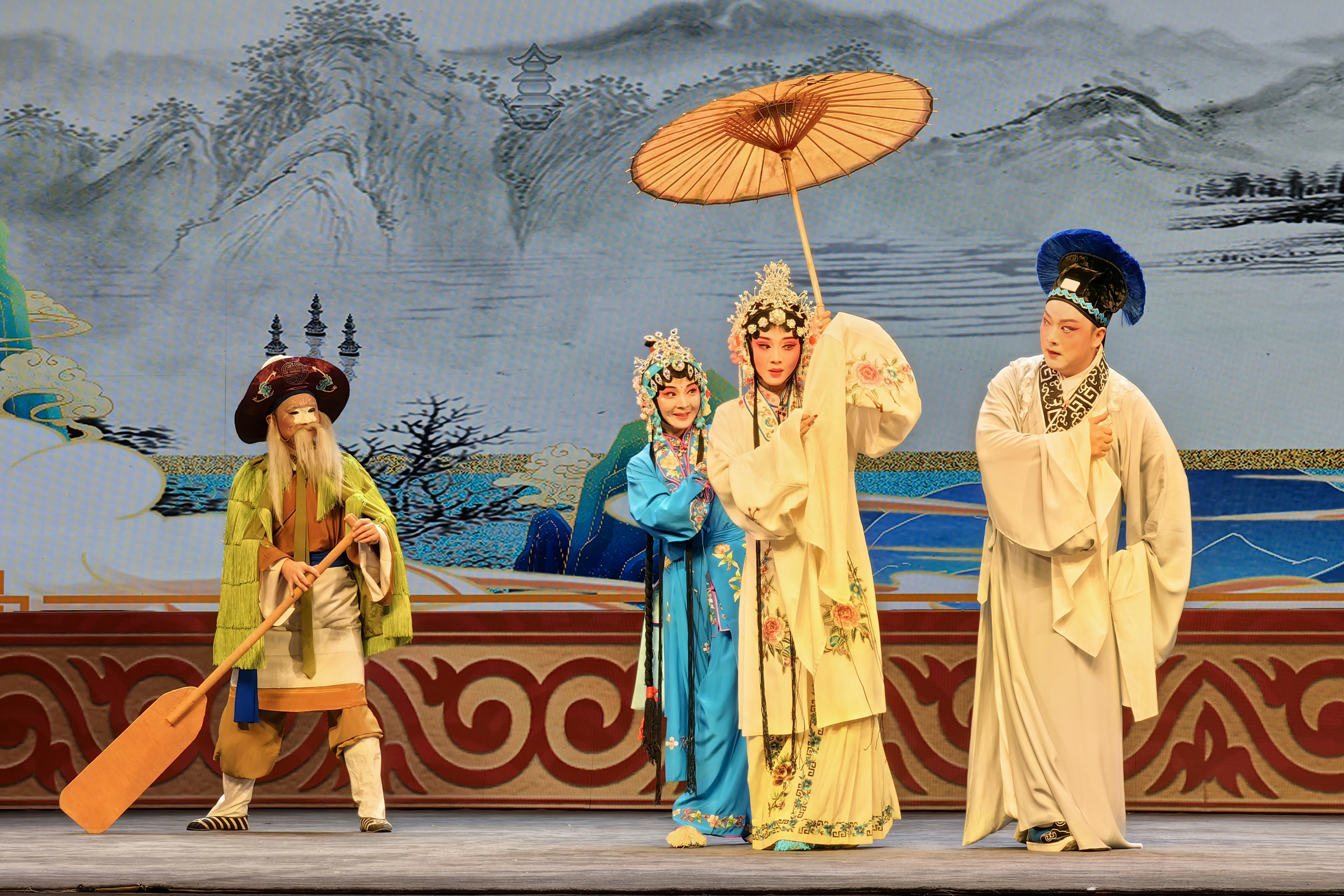
The scene of Yun opera The Legend of the White Snake, where the hero and heroine first met over West Lake

West Lake has deeply influenced Chinese literature, inspiring poets and writers for centuries. Works by poets such as Bai Juyi, Su Shi, Xu Zhimo, and Hu Shih celebrate its historic sites and natural beauty. The Ming essayist Zhang Dai also honoured the lake in his writings, including Reminiscence and Dream of Tao'an and Search for West Lake in Dreams. In folklore, West Lake serves as the setting for several popular tales, including The Legend of the White Snake, the stories of Ji Gong, and Butterfly Lovers.

During the 1920s and 1930s, West Lake was a prominent theme in popular film music. The Cantonese songwriter Lü Wencheng composed the classic Autumn Moon Over the Calm Lake and Three Ponds Mirroring the Moon during his 1930s visit, while Tan Peiyun contributed Listening to Orioles at Willow Waves. These compositions are now considered staples of Cantonese music. The 1959 violin concerto Butterfly Lovers, inspired by the Yue Opera adaptation, remains a celebrated piece in Chinese orchestral repertoire. Between 2004 and 2008, Wang Guoping compiled *The West Lake Series*, which includes the extensive Collection of Documents about West Lake (30 volumes) and The Complete Library of West Lake (50 volumes).

The influence of West Lake extends to film and performance. The 2005 Hong Kong film A West Lake Moment, directed by Yim Ho and Yang Zi. Since 2006, the Hangzhou Art Week has been rebranded as the Spring of West Lake Art Festival. In 2007, director Zhang Yimou launched Impression West Lake, a popular and ongoing lakeside performance. Additionally, the West Lake International Documentary Festival, initiated in 2017, has become a significant event in China's film scene.

=== Toponymy ===
The following places are named after or associated with West Lake:

- Administrative division: Xihu Subdistrict, Xihu District, Hubin Subdistrict
- Roads: Xihu Avenue, Hubin Road, Hubin Park, West Lake Tunnel
- Schools: West Lake Primary School, Hangzhou West Lake Senior High School, Hangzhou West Lake Vocational High School, Westlake University
- Buildings: West Lake Cultural Plaza, West Lake Cinema, West Lake Museum, West Lake State Guest House, Xizi Hotel
- Lakes: Slender West Lake of Yangzhou, West Lake of Huizhou
- Festivals: West Lake International Documentary Festival, West Lake Day

== See also ==
- Cultural landscape
- Timeline of Hangzhou
