= Timeline of Hangzhou =

The following is a timeline of the history of the city of Hangzhou, the capital of Zhejiang Province in eastern China.

== Prehistory ==
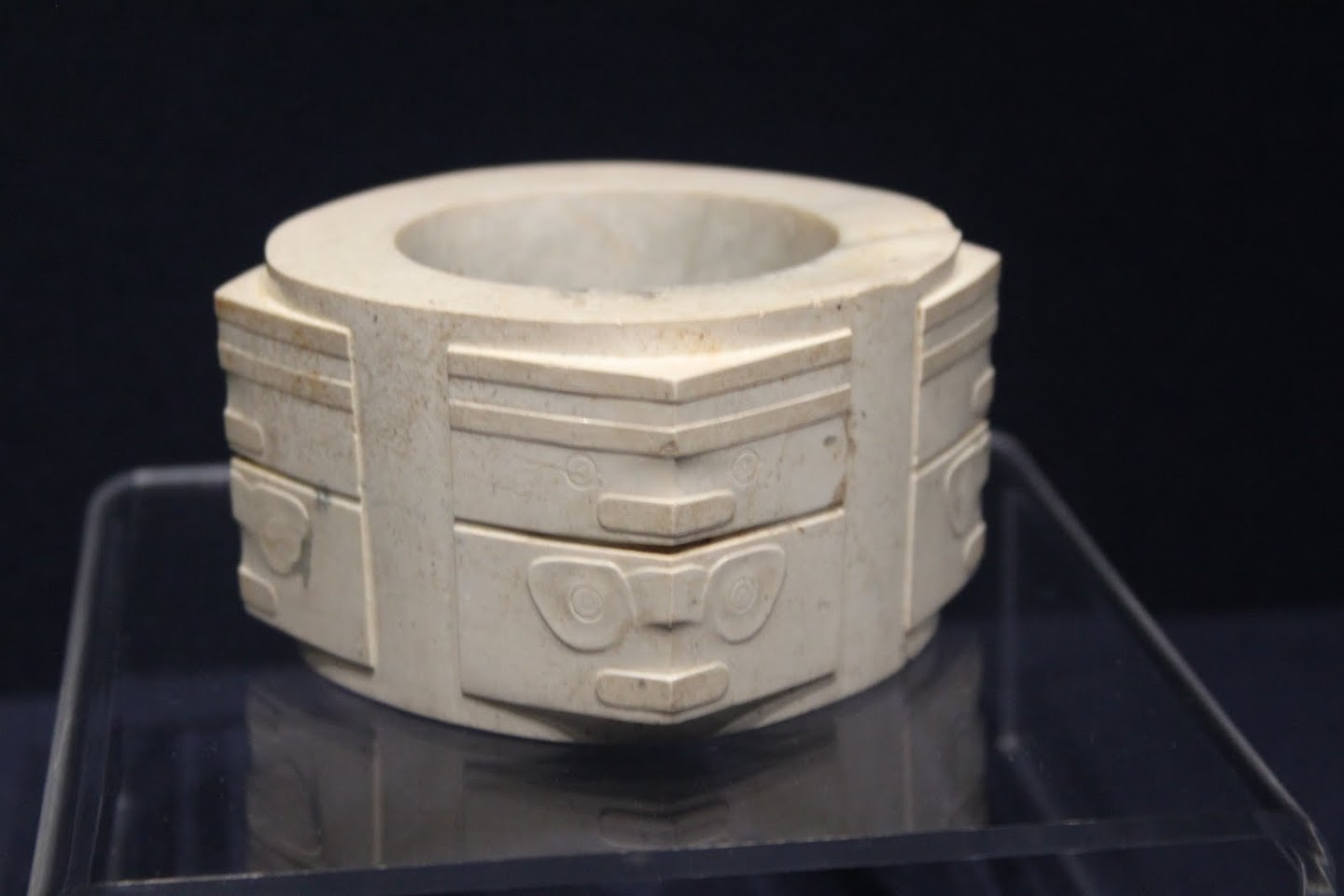
A jade cong of the Liangzhu culture.

- c. 5000–4000 bce – The period of maximal sea intrusion into Hangzhou Bay following the end of the last Ice Age.
- c. 3300–2300 bce – The highly stratified agricultural Liangzhu culture dominates the area of Hangzhou Municipality from its capital in present-day Yuhang District.
- c. 1900–1200 bce – The Maqiao culture (zh:马桥文化) fills the area of the former Liangzhu and probably initiates bronze working.

== Early history ==
The Qiantang River and its connections to the Jiangnan and Zhedong Canals at Hangzhou

- c. 1100–223 bce – The area of Hangzhou Municipality in contested between Wu (Suzhou), Yue (Shaoxing), and Chu (Hubei) during China's Zhou and Warring States eras.
- 222 bce – The Qin army under Wang Jian and Meng Wu pacify the southeast regions formerly held by Chu, including areas around Hangzhou held by members of the former Yue royal family, organizing them as the Qin Empire's Kuaiji Commandery.
- c. 1 – A sandbar separates a lagoon from Hangzhou Bay in the East China Sea, forming what will become West Lake and Hangzhou proper.
- c. 100 – The first seawalls are erected along the coast of Hangzhou Bay to protect against the Qiantang River's tidal bore.
- c. 290–301 – He Xun constructs the Xixing Canal, linking the Qiantang River with Kuaiji (Shaoxing) and forming the western end of the Eastern Zhejiang Canal.
- 328 – Legendary date of the establishment of Lingyin Temple in the Wulin Hills by the Indian missionary Huili.
- 330 – Legendary date of the establishment of Fajing Temple (法镜寺), the Lower Tianzhu Temple (下天竺寺), in the Wulin Hills.
- 587 – The Southern Chen establish Qiantang Commandery, overseeing 4 counties.

== Sui dynasty ==
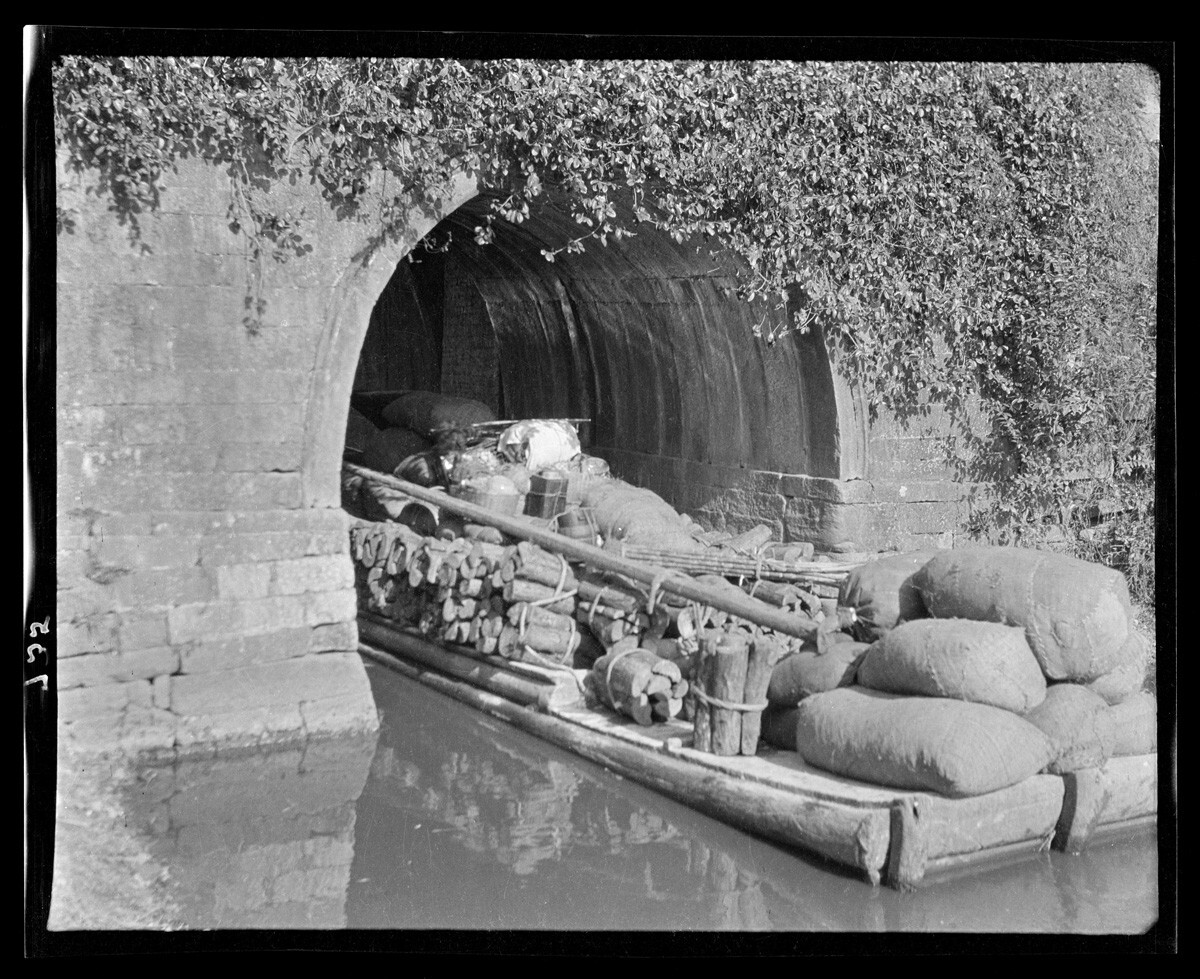
A barge passing through the city wall's Fengshan Gate, which protected the link between the Grand Canal & the Qiantang.

- 589 – The Sui conquer Chen, reforming Qiantang Commandery as Hang Prefecture (Háng Zhōu).
- 591 – Hangzhou City Walls first built.
- 597 – Fajing Temple (法淨寺), the Middle Tianzhu Temple (中天竺寺), established.
- c. 609 – The Jiangnan Canal completed, linking Hangzhou north to Suzhou and Yangzhou and forming the southeastern end of the Grand Canal.
- 618–620 – Yuhang Commandery held by the warlord Shen Faxing as part of the "Liang Kingdom".
- 620–621 – The rebel Li Zitong briefly replaces Shen as king of Liang before falling to the Tang lord Li Fuwei.

== Tang dynasty ==
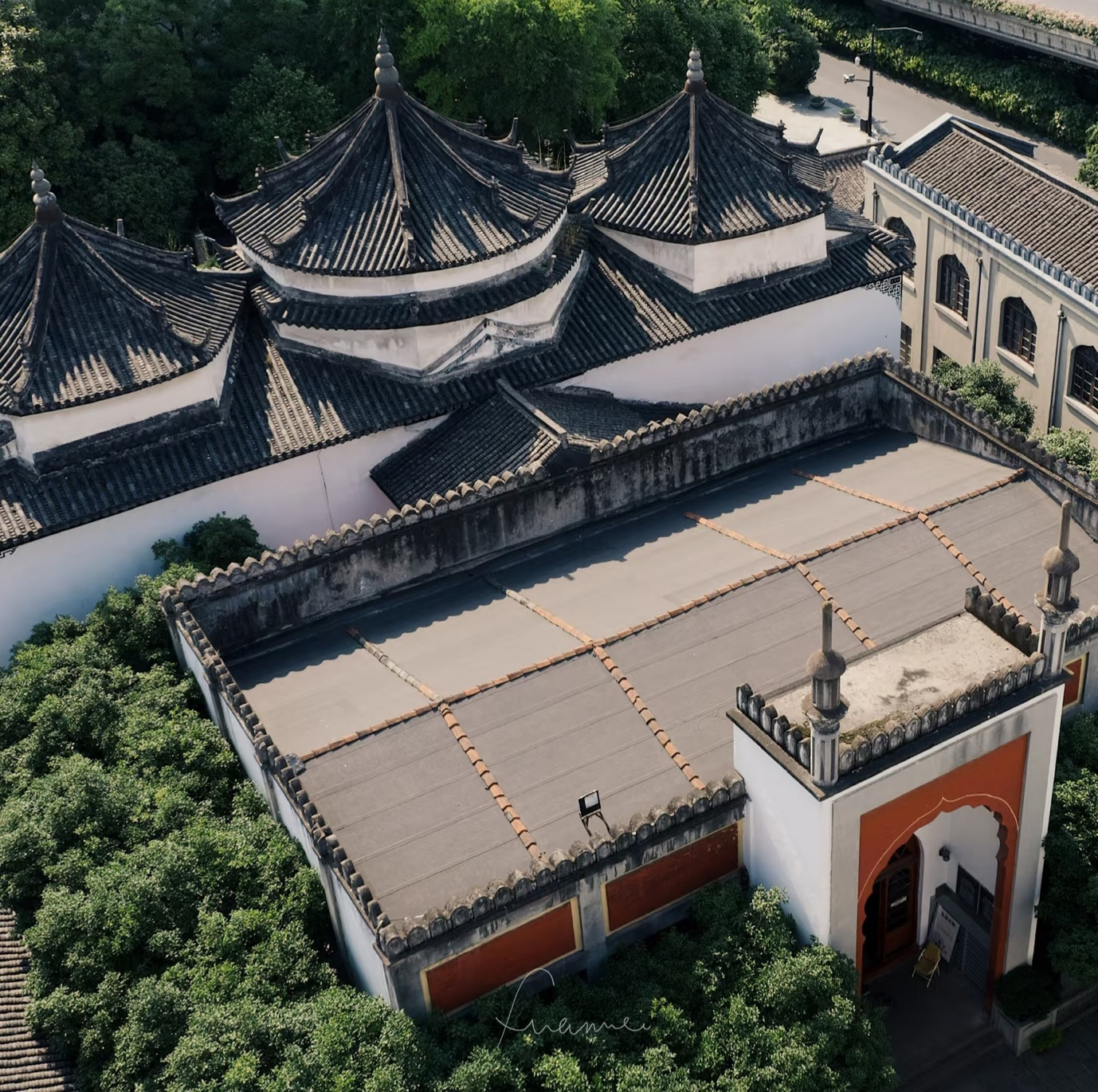
Hangzhou's Phoenix Mosque, following numerous reconstructions

- c. 630 – Establishment of the Phoenix Mosque, one of China's Four Ancient Mosques.
- 653 – The mystic rebel Chen Shuozhen declares herself emperor and overruns Zhejiang for a few months.
- 781–784 – Li Bi's term as prefect of Hangzhou, during which he bores six wells to provide the city with water.
- 822–824 – Bai Juyi's term as prefect of Hangzhou, during which he constructed the Baigong Causeway (白公堤, Báigōngdī) to improve irrigation around West Lake.
- 881–886 – Dong Chang's term as prefect of Hangzhou, which he used as a springboard to power in the late Tang.
- 887–907 – Qian Liu's term as prefect of Hangzhou, which he used to uphold imperial power & secure approval to serve as king of Wuyue.

== Wuyue Kingdom ==
- 907 – The Tang falls to the Later Liang and Wuyue becomes largely independent, taking Hangzhou as its capital under the name Xifu ("Western Prefecture").
- 910 – Qian Liu expands the existing dikes along the Qiantang with his modular "bamboo cage" design.
- 936 – Faxi Temple (法喜寺), the Upper Tianzhu Temple (上天竺寺), established.
- 941 – A major fire destroys most of the Wuyue palace and treasury in August, supposedly driving King Qian Yuanguan mad and mortally ill.
- 954 – Huiri Yongming Temple built at West Lake.
- 963 – Baochu Pagoda built at West Lake.
- 970 – Liuhe Pagoda built.
- 975 – Leifeng Pagoda built.

== Song dynasty ==
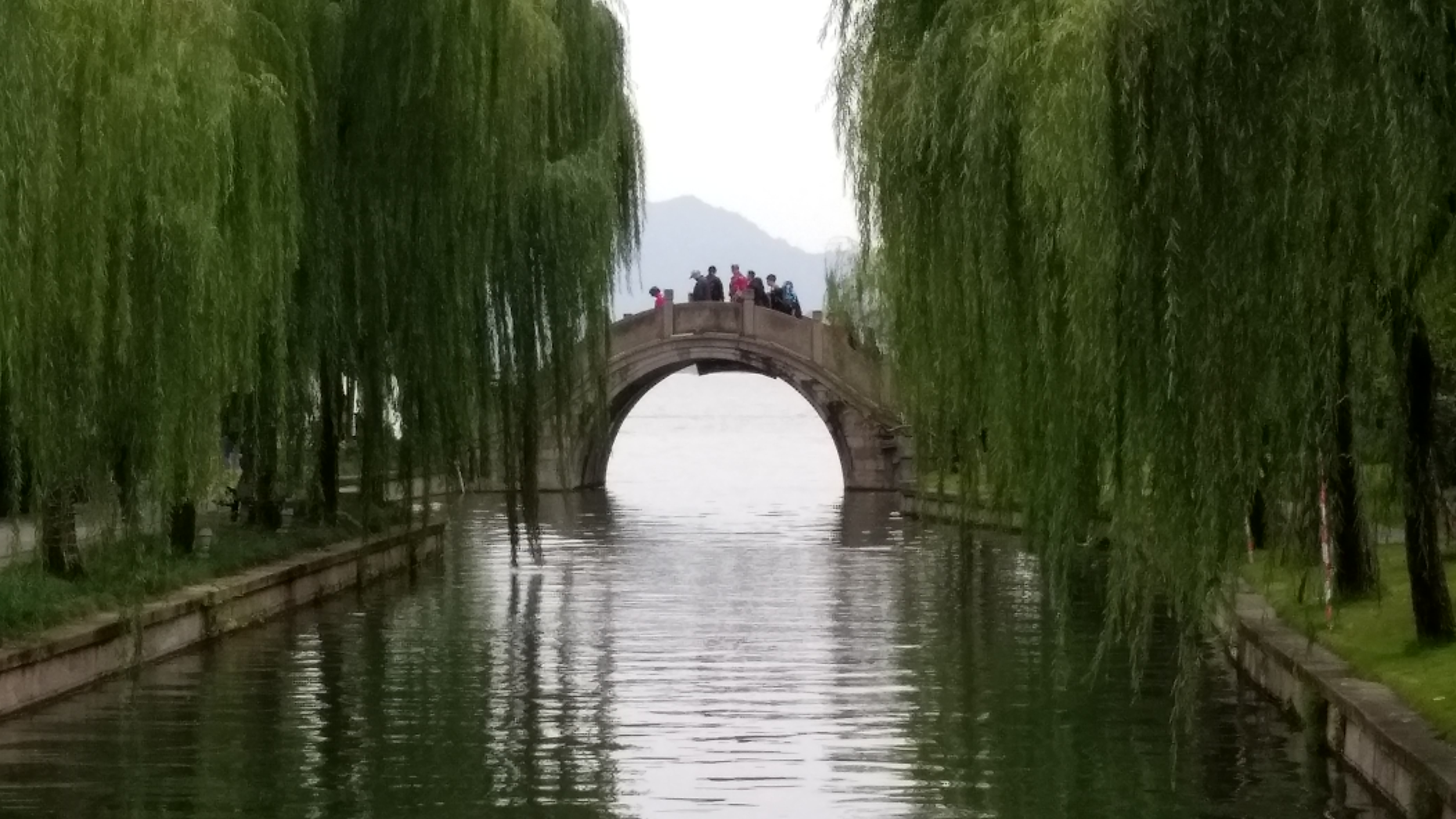
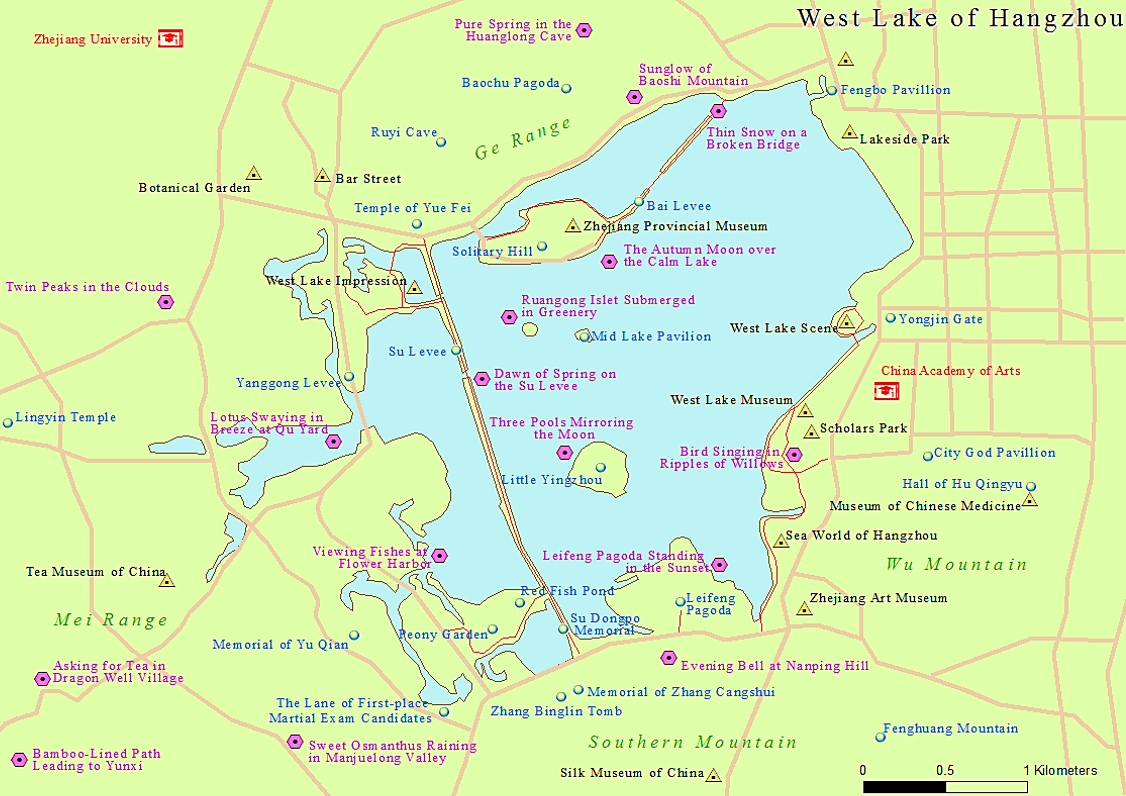
Image and map of West Lake, including causeways ("levees")
- c. 1040 – Bi Sheng develops moveable type in Hangzhou, using an iron frame and ceramic type.
- 1056 – The oldest known tide table written, detailing the periods of the Qiantang River's tidal bore.
- 1077 – The Biaozhong Temple first established to commemorate the Qian kings.
- 1089–1091 – Su Dongpo's term as prefect of Hangzhou, during which he constructed the Su Causeway (蘇堤, Sūdī).
- 1127 – Song dynasty capital relocated from Bianjing (Kaifeng) to Hongzhou—under the name Lin'an—after the Jingkang Incident amid the Jin–Song wars.
- c. 1180 – Hangzhou surpasses Constantinople (Istanbul) and Fez to become the world's most populous city.
- 1221 – Yue Fei Temple built.

== Yuan dynasty ==
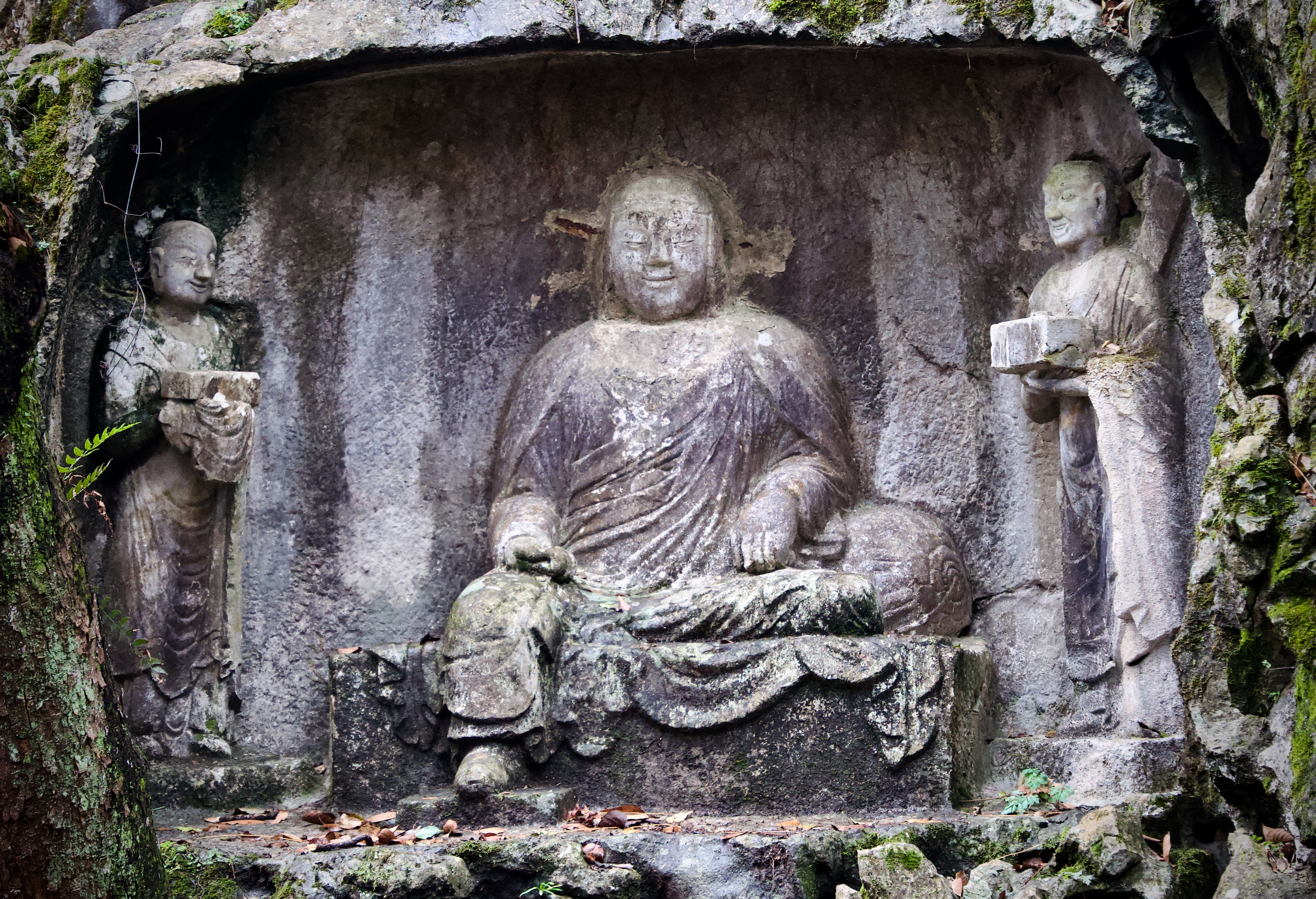
A surviving statue of Yang Lianzhenjia surrounded by acolytes on Feilaifeng, a surviving example after others were beheaded as revenge for his destruction of the Song Palace and Imperial Tombs

- 1275 – Population: 1.75 million.
- 1276 – Mongols reach Hangzhou.
- 1277
  - The Song Imperial Palace destroyed by fire.
  - Yang Lianzhenjia (Chinese: zh:楊璉真珈, Yáng Liǎnzhēnjiā; Tibetan: རིན་ཆེན་སྐྱབས་, Rin-chen-skyabs), a Tangut Tibetan Buddhist monk, begins his decades of work as Supervisor of Buddhist Teaching in Jiangnan; he restores many Buddhist temples and shrines in the area but embezzles huge amounts of land and wealth
  - Hangzhou Salt Distribution Commission established.
- 1285 – Yang Lianzhenjia begins replacing the Song palace complex on Phoenix Hill with five lavishly decorated Buddhist monasteries; he greatly offends many in the region by sending monks to plunder and desecrate the Song imperial tombs near Shaoxing, removing some of their corpses for placement with cattle under a dagoba at the new temples.
- 1290 – Zhou Mi's Antiquities of the Martial Forest (t 《武林舊事》, s 《武林旧事》, Wǔlín Jiùshì) completed, a 10-juan account of Hangzhou under the Southern Song
- 1291 – Yang Lianzhenjia deposed for mismanagement, although he probably returned to office after he was pardoned by Kublai Khan later in the year.
- c. 1298 – Marco Polo allegedly relates his travels to Rustichello da Pisa in a Genovese jail, including a fabulous account of the wonders of Hangzhou ("Quinsai") under the Yuan.
- 1350s – Hangzhou replaced by Jiankang (Nanjing) as the world's most populous city.
- 1366 – Zhu Yuanzhang, subsequently the Hongwu Emperor of the Ming, attacks and seizes Hangzhou.

== Ming dynasty ==
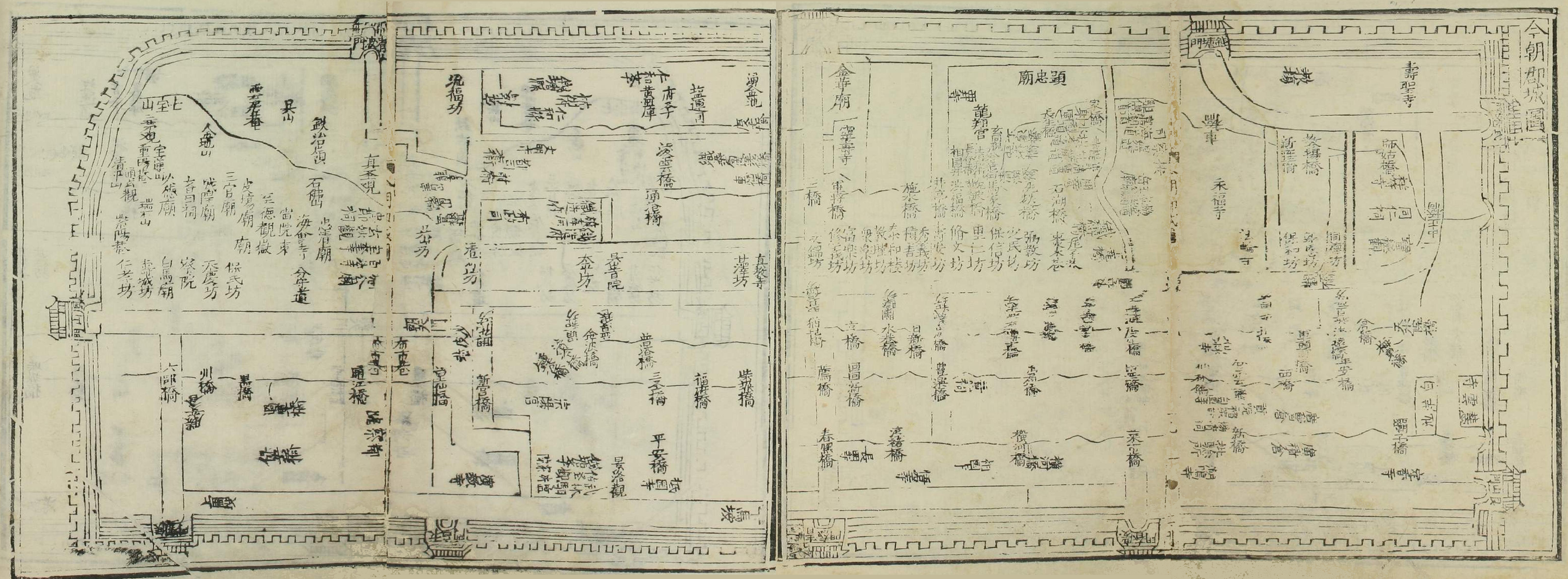
A map of Ming-era Hangzhou from Tian Rucheng's West Lake Gazetteer

- 1442 – West Lake completely dries out during a drought.
- 1456 – West Lake again dries completely out during a drought.
- 1457 – Tian Rucheng (田汝成) publishes his West Lake Gazetteer (西湖游覽志, Xihu Youlan Zhi) and its supplement (西湖游覽志餘, Xihu Youlan Zhiyu).
- 1459 – Yu Qian buried with honor in Hangzhou, having been posthumously rehabilitated after his execution.
- 1553–1558 – Wokou pirates repeatedly attack Hangzhou Bay, getting as far as Hangzhou on occasion.
- 1621 – Huanduzhai publishing house in business.
- 1641 – West Lake again dries out during a drought, the lake bed itself described as cracking.

== Qing dynasty ==
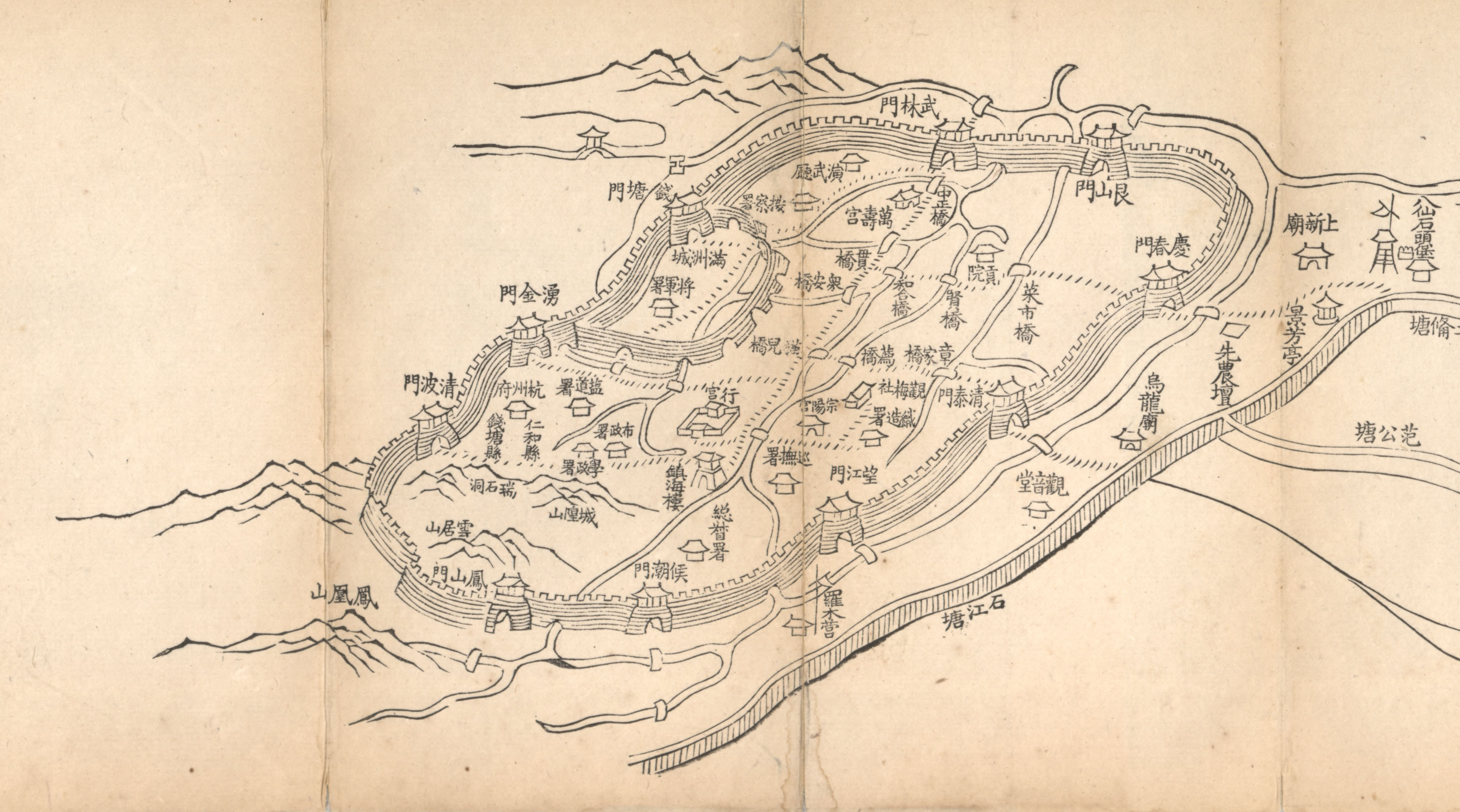
A detail of Qing-era Hangzhou from the Map of the Route from Anlang Garden to Hangzhou's Temporary Palace (c. 1765)

- 1645 – Hangzhou falls to the invading Qing in May.
- 1647 – The Hangzhou Weaving Bureau restored as one of the Qing's three centers of silk production, alongside Suzhou and Jiangning.
- 1648 – A huge area of central Hangzhou appropriated and walled off for use by Manchu residents and their banner garrison. Roughly 10,000 Han families formerly residing there evicted without compensation and obliged to continue paying taxes on the seized property for the next two decades.
- 1660 – A major fire destroys much of the city.
- 1661 – Cathedral of the Immaculate Conception built.
- 1663 – A Hangzhou publisher's account of the Ming dynasty becomes the first literary persecution of the Han under the Manchu Qing.
- 1666 – Another major fire again destroys much of the city.
- 1689 – The Kangxi Emperor visits West Lake for the first time on his second southern tour. A great deal of local rebuilding and public works accompanies this and subsequent imperial visits to the area. The imperial gardens around Beijing are also rebuilt or expanded to imitate the scenery and gardens of Hangzhou, Suzhou, and other parts of Jiangnan.
- 1699
  - The Kangxi Emperor revisits West Lake on his third southern tour. He provides calligraphic plaques for each of the Ten Scenes of West Lake.
  - West Lake overflows amid heavy rains, covering all its causeways.
- 1703 – The Kangxi Emperor's third visit to West Lake.
- 1705 – The Kangxi Emperor's fourth visit to West Lake.
- 1707 – The Kangxi Emperor's fifth and final visit to West Lake.
- 1722 – The Zhejiang governor Li Wei begins dredging West Lake and further improving its surroundings.
- 1729 – The Yongzheng Emperor orders local officials to protect and maintain memorials of the Kangxi Emperor's visits.
- 1731 – Li Wei establishes the Hushan Temple (湖山廟) to propitiate and honor the spirit of West Lake.
- 1751 – The Qianlong Emperor visits West Lake on the first of his southern tours. His poetry commemorating the tea fields around Longjing begin the modern popularity of its particular green tea.
- 1757 – The Qianlong Emperor's second visit to West Lake.
- 1762 – The Qianlong Emperor's third visit to West Lake.
- 1765 – The Qianlong Emperor's fourth visit to West Lake.
- 1780 – The Qianlong Emperor's fifth southern tour includes a viewing of the Qiantang tidal bore at Haining and, at West Lake, the establishment of a formal tomb honoring Su Xiaoxiao on the shore northwest of Gushan Island. Shen Fu subsequently complains that the construction work and increased visitors ruins the area for romantic poets.
- 1782 – Upon the completion of the Siku Quanshu encyclopedia, a copy is bestowed on the library at the Wenyuan Pavilion (文淵閣, Wényuāngé) east of the imperial palace on Gushan.
- 1784 – The Qianlong Emperor's sixth and final visit to West Lake.
- 1797 – Ruan Yuan refurbishes West Lake, ultimately producing Ruangong Islet from the material built up during the lake's dredging.
- 1853 – Taiping rebels occupy enough of Jiangnan to block access to the Grand Canal, forcing Hangzhou's northern trade to reroute through British-occupied Shanghai.
- 1860 – Taiping forces continually raid the area, holding the city between March 19 and March 24 and assaulting the guards at Gushan in November.
- 1861
  - Refugees fleeing the Taipings at least double the city's population, possibly swelling it from around 600,000 to as much as 2.3 million.
  - Taiping rebels—many fleeing north from Zuo Zongtang's reconquest of Jiangxi—besiege Hangzhou from October to 28 December, when the city's militia deserted. The Taipings were able to scale the wall, open the Huochao, Fengshan, and Qingbo Gates, and overrun the outer city the next day. Encircling, negotiating with, and storming the Manchu garrison required a further two days. Around 600,000–800,000 died during the conquest, chiefly from starvation and suicide. Hangzhou reportedly sold human flesh in the streets, while nearby towns reported peddlers selling cups of blood to the starving.
  - The Wenlan Pavilion is greatly damaged and its collection scattered.
- 1864 – Qing forces under Zuo Zongtang retake city on March 31, the population falling from between 800,000 and a million to less than 200,000, possibly as low as 70,000, amid a frenzy of murder and looting.
- 1867 – Ningpo Boys' Boarding School moves from Ningbo (where its lease had expired) to Hangzhou, changing its name to Hangchow Presbyterian Boys' School.
- 1871 – Kwang-Chi Hospital established.
- 1873 – The case of Yang Naiwu and Little Cabbage decided in Hangzhou's provincial court based on evidence from torture. After much publicity and the involvement of many Zhejiang scholar-officials, the verdict was overturned on appeal to Beijing in 1877.
- 1874 – Hu Xueyan establishes the Hu Qing Yu Tang TCM clinic and pharmacy.
- 1875 – Hu Xueyan's mansion completed.
- 1878 – Hu Qing Yu Tang's TCM pharmacy opened to the public.
- 1880–1881 – The Wenlan Pavilion is repaired and known parts of its collection restored, chiefly by the local bibliophile Ding Bing (丁丙).
- 1883 – Hangzhou telegraph established.
- 1885 – Kwang Chi Medical School established.
- 1896
  - City opens to foreign trade under the Treaty of Shimonoseki ending the First Sino-Japanese War, but Hangzhou's Japanese Concession becomes a red light district and gambling venue rather than an industrial or commercial center.
  - Late Qing reforms prompt the construction of a major cotton mill and silk reeling factory in Hangzhou's northern suburbs.
- 1897
  - Qiushi Academy founded.
  - Hangchow Presbyterian Boys' School adds tertiary education courses, changing its name to Hangchow Presbyterian College.
  - Hangzhou's first modern newspapers established, the Jingshi Ribao (經世日報) and the Hang Bao (杭報).
- 1898 – Britain formally authorized to begin construction on a railway from Shanghai to Hangzhou, but construction never occurs owing to vehement local disagreement with the concession.
- 1899 – Hangzhou High School established.
- 1900 – Hangzhou Library established as a private organization.
- 1904 – Xiling Seal Art Society founded.
- 1905 – Hangzhou merchants begin a boycott of American products that spreads throughout China.
- 1906 – Construction on the Shanghai–Hangzhou Railroad begins as a joint project between the provincial governments of Jiangsu and Zhejiang.
- 1907 – Qing Tai Men Station opens.
- 1908
  - Establishment of the General Administration for Zhejiang Seawalls, introducing foreign designs into the dikes protecting against the Qiantang Bore.
  - Zhejiang Official Secondary Normal School in operation.
  - Presbyterian Mission Girls' School opens.
- 1909 – Completion of the Shanghai–Hangzhou Railroad, shortening travel time from a three days' sail to a three-hour ride and strengthening the city's tourism.

== Republican era ==
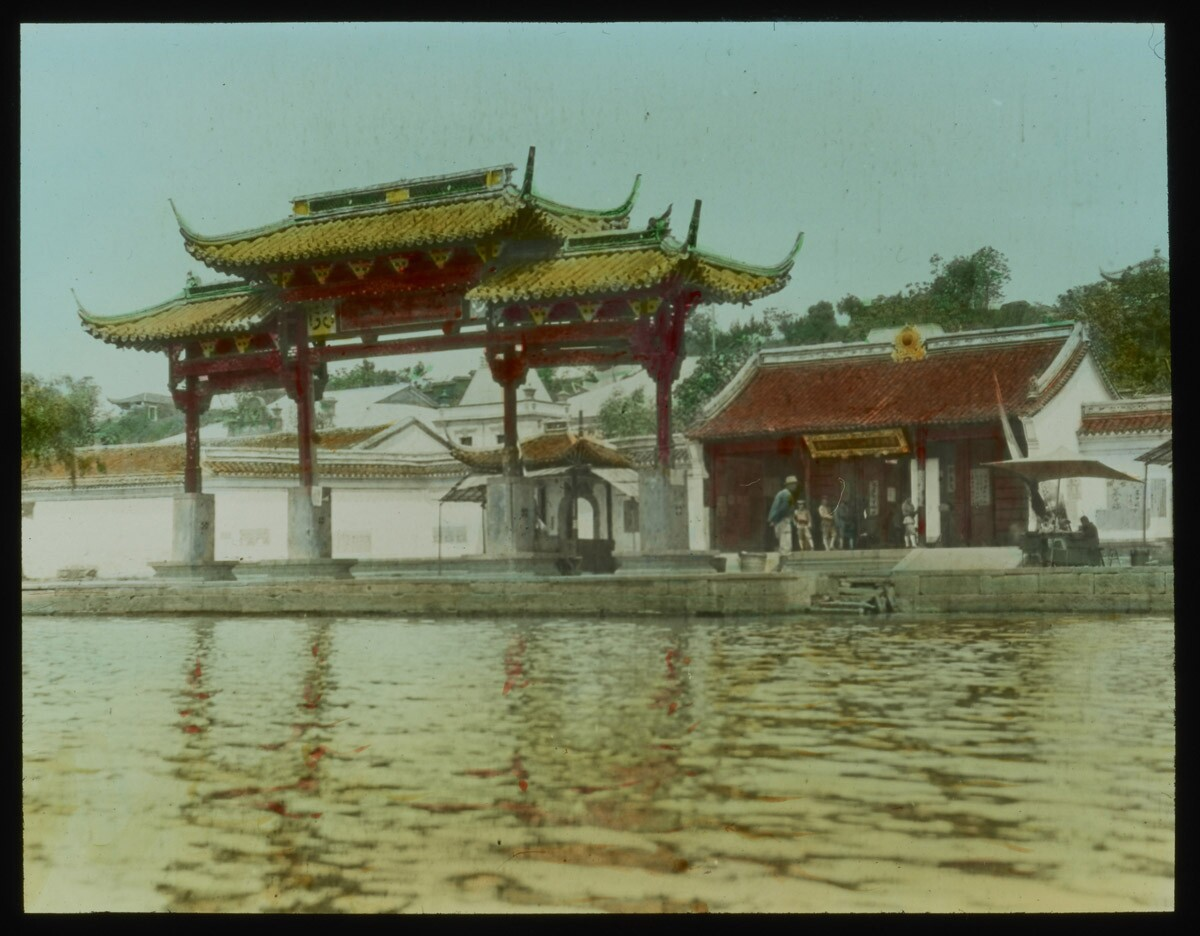
Gateway to the former imperial palace on Gushan Island, repurposed by Republican China as Zhongshan Park (1919)

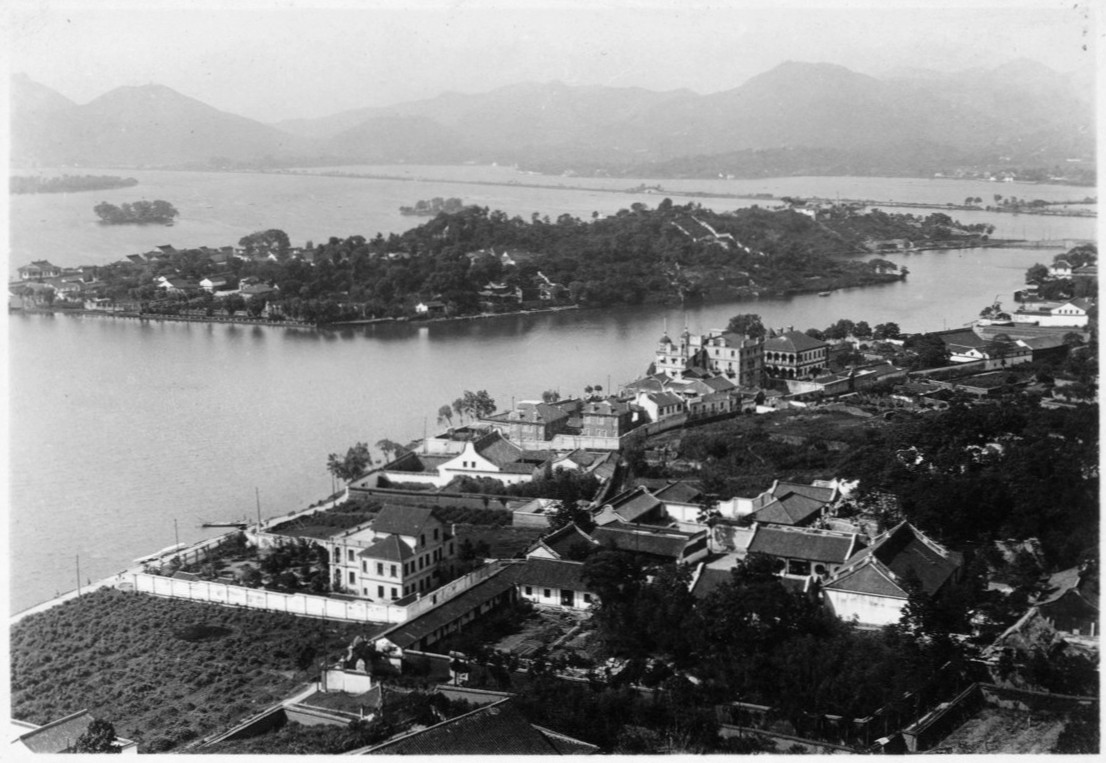
Gushan Island and the villas to its north (1920s)

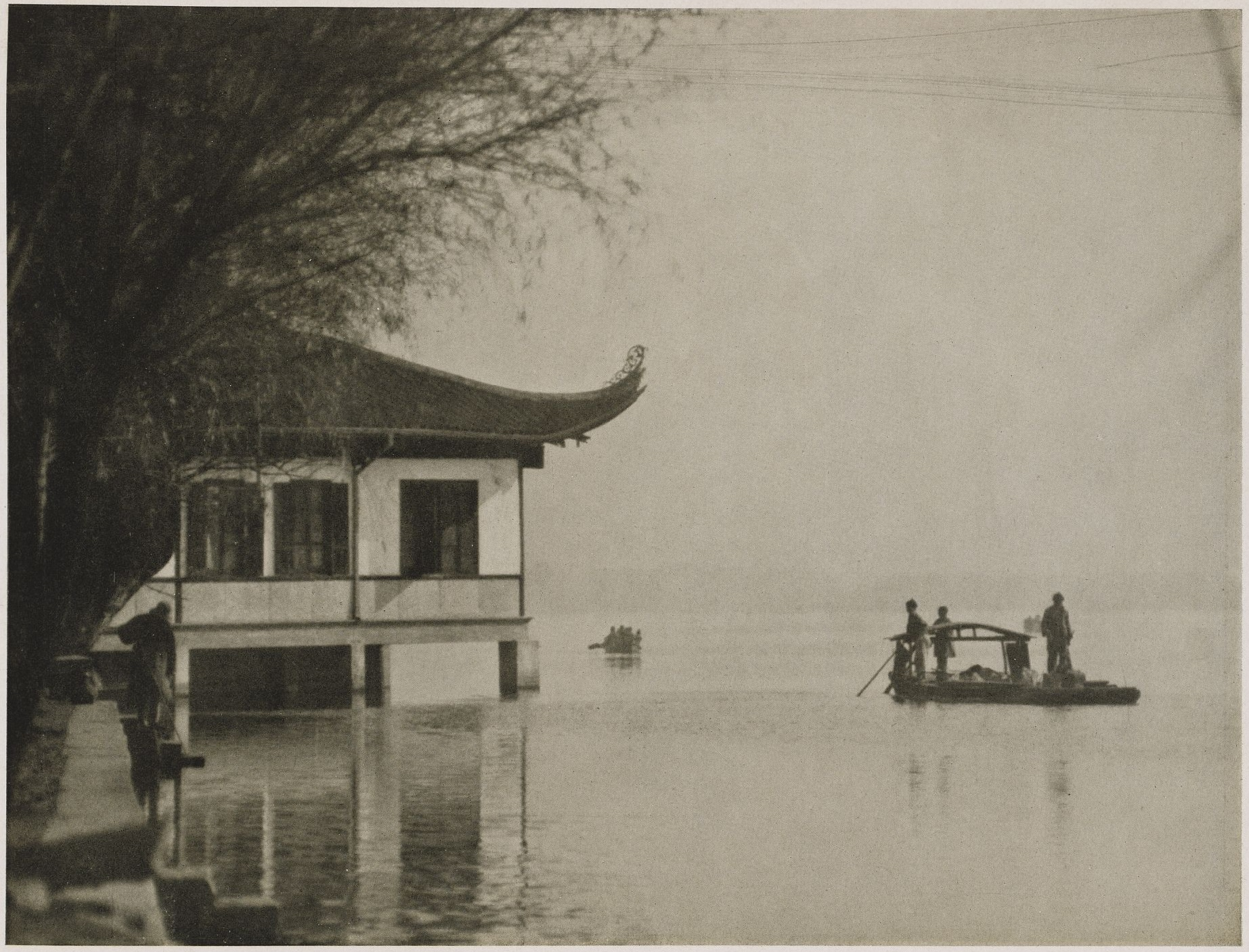
Boat on West Lake (1931)

- 1911
  - November: Xinhai Revolution reaches Hangzhou, with the city's Qing New Army units taking over in two days with minimal opposition from the Manchu garrison, who negotiated surrender and free passage in exchange for handing over their arsenal.
  - Zhejiang Medical School founded.
  - Population: 141,859.
- 1912 – The walls of the city's Manchu district dismantled, including the section doubling as the city wall dividing West Lake from Hangzhou.
- 1913 – The former Manchu district begins being sold by the provincial government to commercial interests to become the city's New Business District (新市场). The space formerly occupied by its walls is repurposed for use as new roads including Lakeshore Road (湖濱路) and additional areas are set aside for parks, especially along West Lake (湖滨公园).
- 1918 – The Zhejiang Products Exhibition Hall (浙江商品陈列馆) constructed in the center of the New Business District to expand regional business .
- 1922
  - The Communist Party holds its Hangzhou Meeting (杭州會議), leading to its first collaboration with the Kuomintang. Hangzhou's own first Party cell begins operation in September.
  - Sisters of Charity Hospital founded.
- 1924 – Leifeng Pagoda collapses at 1 pm on September 25, prompting influential articles opposing traditional Chinese thought by Lu Xun.
- 1928
  - Kuomintang in power.
  - Population: 817,267.
- 1929
  - Zhejiang Provincial Museum established.
  - 1929 Westlake exposition held.
- 1937
  - The Qiantang Bridge is completed on September 26, connecting Hangzhou to Shaoxing by direct road and rail.
  - The National Revolutionary Army withdraws from Hangzhou and its Japanese occupation begins on 23–24 December.
- 1943 – Many sections of Hangzhou's seawall are destroyed during the autumn tidal bores.
- 1945 – The Japanese occupation of Hangzhou ends, with the Imperial Japanese Army withdrawing from the city in October. People considered traitors for their aid to Japan during the war are arrested.
- 1947 – Hangzhou Buddhist Academy founded.
- 1948 – West Lake freezes over on January 26.

== Communist era ==
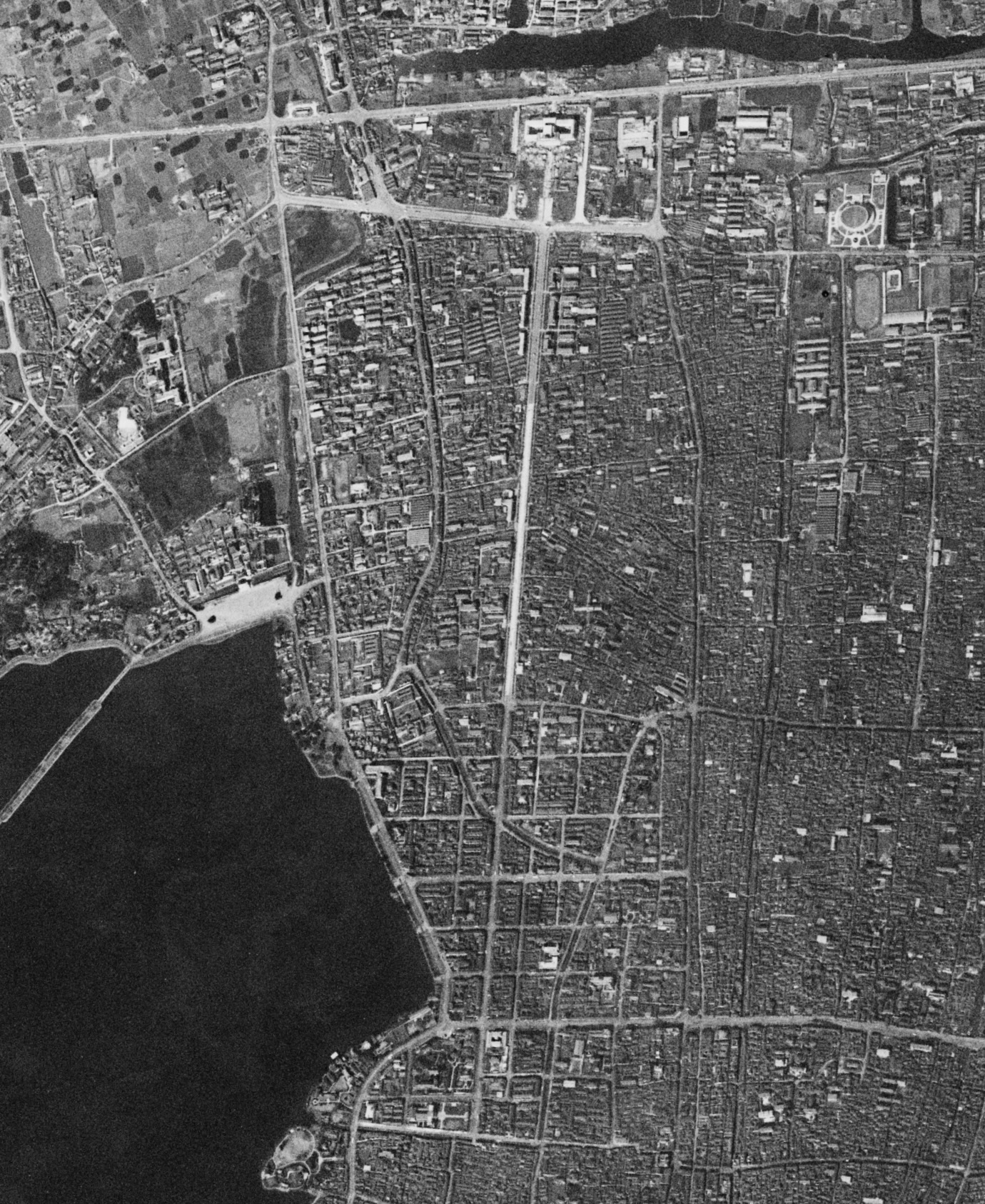
Central Hangzhou and the northeastern corner of West Lake in 1969. The outline of the city's former Manchu Quarter and inner canal network are still clearly visible.

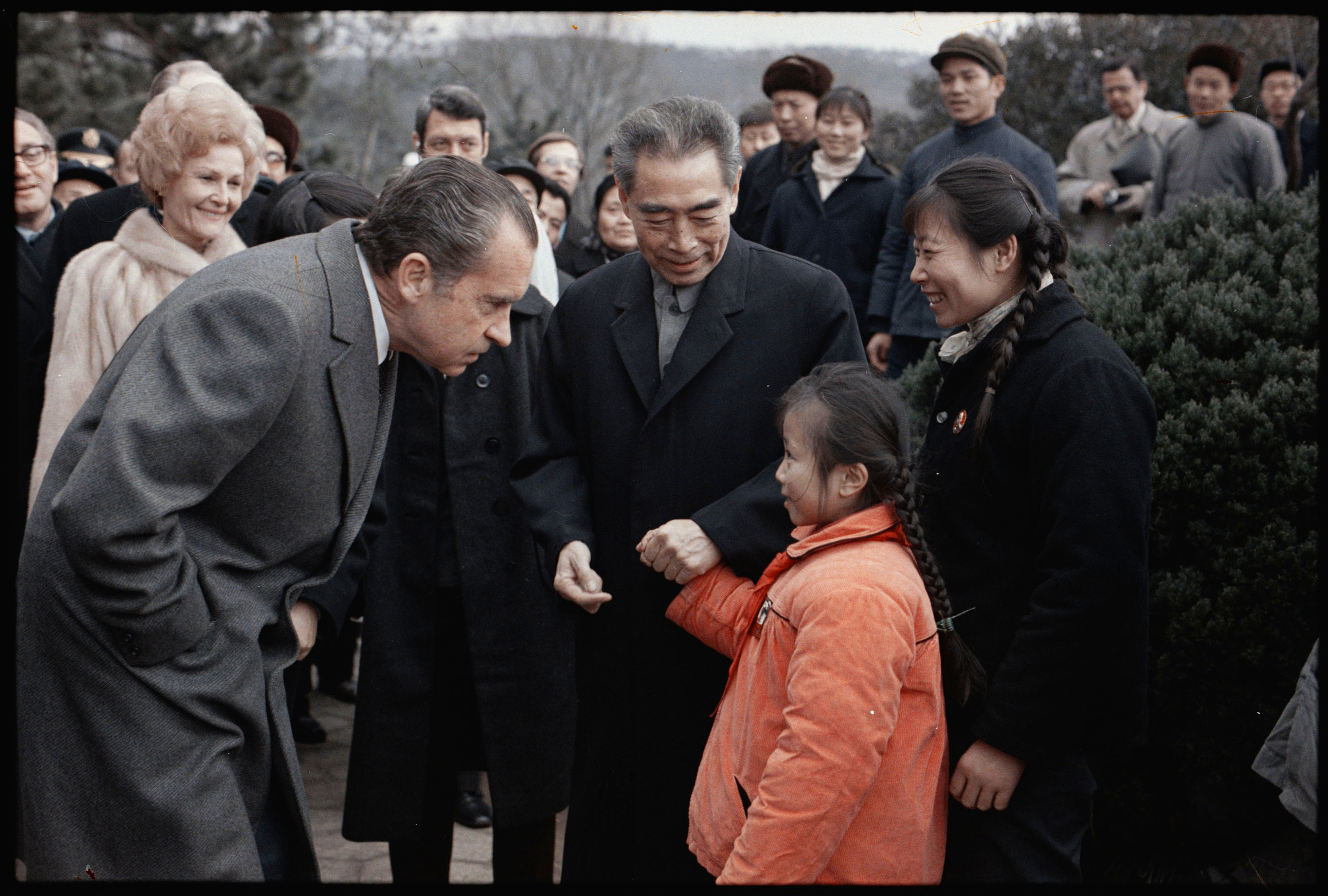
Richard Nixon and Zhou Enlai in Hangzhou, 1972

- 1949 – The 21st Division of the People's Liberation Army take the city on May 3.
- 1953 – Zhou Enlai authorizes emergency repairs to the heavily damaged Lingyin Temple.
- 1955 – The Hangzhou Daily (Hangzhou Ribao) newspaper begins publication on November 1.
- 1956 – Hangzhou Xuejun High School and Hangzhou Botanical Garden established.
- 1957
  - Hangzhou Jianqiao Airport begins operating civilian flights.
  - Population: 784,000.
- 1958 – Hangzhou Zoo opens.
- 1962 – Wang Zida becomes mayor.
- 1966
  - The Cultural Revolution begins, damaging or destroying many sites throughout Hangzhou in an effort to combat the Four Olds. Zhou Enlai closes the Lingyin Temple in August in an effort to protect it from the Red Guards.
  - Hangzhou Gymnasium opens.
- 1971 – The exiled Cambodian prince Norodom Sihanouk visits Hangzhou in February, prompting the repair of some damaged sites.
- 1972 – The American president Richard Nixon visits Hangzhou, prompting further repairs.
- 1973 – The French president Georges Pompidou visits Hangzhou.
- 1977 – Zhang Zishi becomes mayor.
- 1978 – Hangzhou Teachers College founded.
- 1979 – Chen Anyu becomes mayor.
- 1981 – Zhou Feng becomes mayor.
- 1982 – Earth is added to Ruangong Islet in West Lake to develop it for tourism.
- 1984 – Zhong Boxi becomes mayor.
- 1988 – Zhang Taiyan Museum opens.
- 1989
  - Protests.
  - Hangzhou Wahaha Nutritional Foods Factory in business.
  - Lu Wenge becomes mayor.
- 1990 – Population: 2,589,504.
- 1991
  - Hangzhou Hi-Tech Industrial Development Zone approved.
  - 1947 Constitution amended, former Nationalist government in Taiwan downplays claim to Hangzhou
- 1992
  - Wang Yongming becomes mayor.
  - Yue Fei Tomb shopping mall built.
- 1993 – Hangzhou Economic & Technological Development Zone approved.
- 1998
  - Zhejiang University established.
  - Hangzhou Xiaoshan Sports Centre (stadium) built.
  - Hangzhou Greentown Football Club formed.
- 1999 – Hangzhou railway station rebuilt.
- 2000
  - Hangzhou Xiaoshan Airport begins operating.
  - Hangzhou Export Processing Zone approved.
  - Dragon Well Manor in business.
  - Population: 3,240,947.
- 2001 – Hu Xueyan's Former Residence reconstructed and opened to the public as a museum.
- 2002
  - Xihuwenhua Square built.
  - Wang Guoping becomes CPC Party chief.
  - Leifeng Pagoda reconstructed.
- 2003
  - Temple of the Qian Kings restored and opened to the public.
  - Yellow Dragon Sports Center and Hangzhou No.2 Telecom Hub constructed.
- 2005 – Sun Zhonghuan becomes mayor.
- 2007
  - Hangzhou Sanchao Football Club formed.
  - Cai Qi becomes mayor.
- 2008
  - Hangzhou Public Bicycle program launched.
  - City logo design adopted.
- 2010
  - Shanghai–Hangzhou Passenger Railway begins operating.
  - Huang Kunming becomes CPC Party chief.
- 2011
  - Shao Zhanwei becomes mayor.
  - West Lake inscribed as a UNESCO World Heritage Site.
- 2012 – November: Hangzhou Metro begins operating.
- 2013 – Air pollution in Hangzhou reaches annual mean of 61 PM2.5 and 106 PM10, much higher than recommended.

== See also ==
- History sections of Hangzhou, Hang Prefecture, Hangzhou City Wall, and West Lake
- List of largest cities in history
- List of prefects of Hangzhou and Category:Mayors of Hangzhou
- Major National Historical and Cultural Sites (Zhejiang) and Lists of 1st, 2nd, 3rd, 4th, and 5th batches of historic buildings in Hangzhou
- List of universities and colleges in Hangzhou
- Urbanization in China
