= Fuchsia Dunlop =

English writer and cook

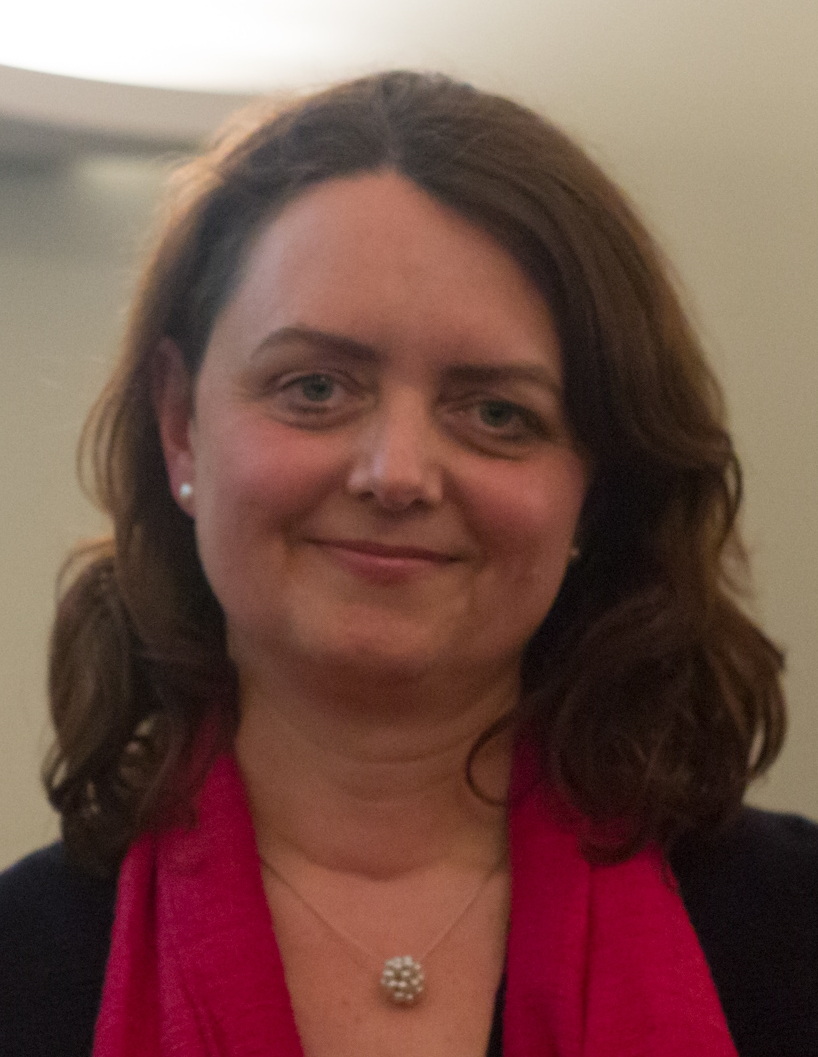
Fuchsia Dunlop in 2018.

Fuchsia Charlotte Dunlop is an English writer and cook who specialises in Chinese cuisine, especially Sichuan cuisine. She is the author of seven books, including the autobiographical Shark's Fin and Sichuan Pepper (2008). According to Julia Moskin in The New York Times, Dunlop "has done more to explain real Chinese cooking to non-Chinese cooks than anyone".

== Early life and education ==
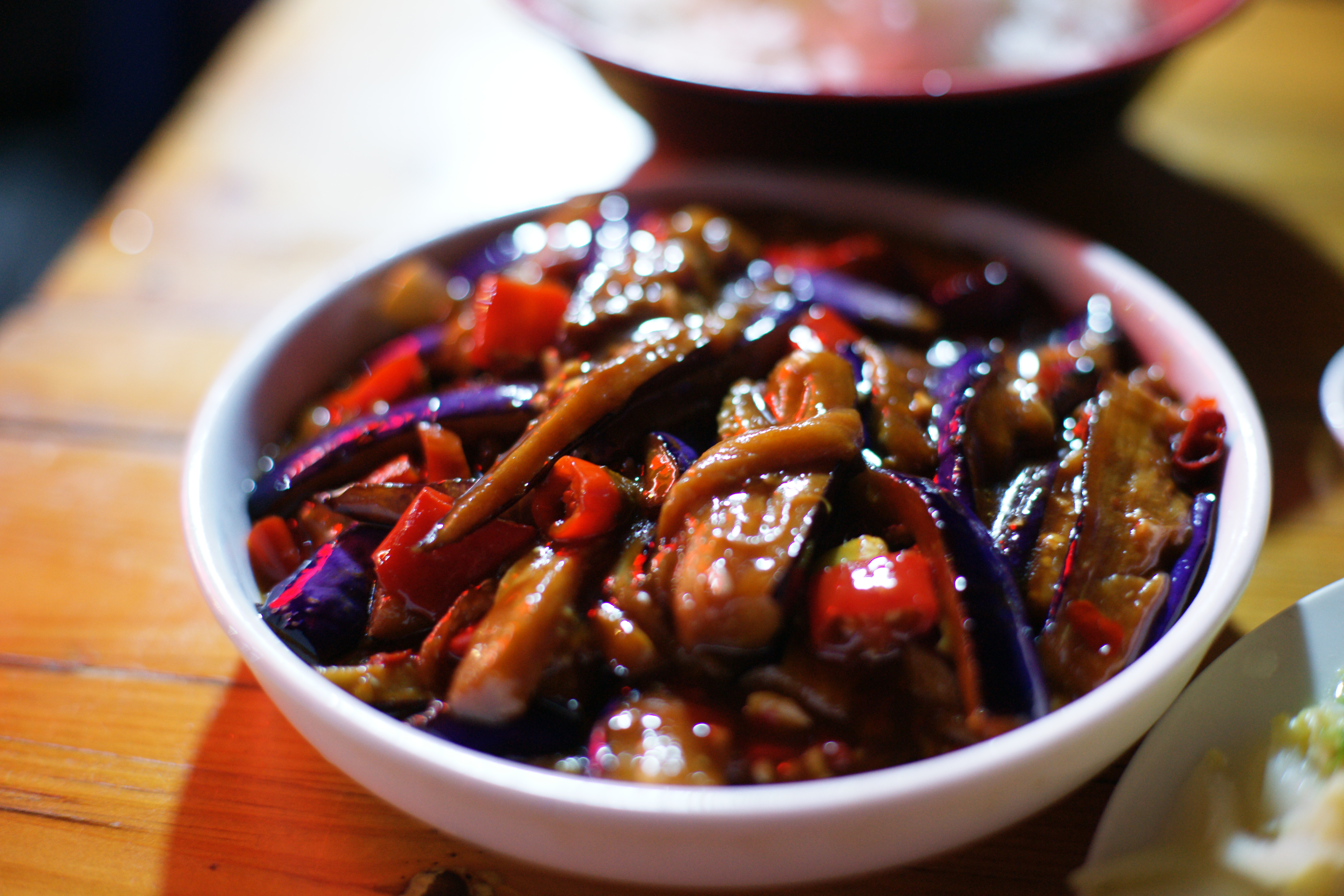
A bowl of 'fish-fragrant aubergine' (yuxiang qiezi)

Dunlop was brought up in Oxford, daughter of (Michael) Bede Dunlop and Carolyn Patricia Dunlop (née Baxter). Her father, a Corpus Christi College, Oxford-educated computer analyst, is son of David Colin Dunlop, Dean of Lincoln from 1949 to 1964 and subsequently an Assistant Bishop of Lincoln. Her mother was a sales executive. She attended Oxford High School, a private day school for girls. She studied English literature at Magdalene College, Cambridge (BA 1991). She worked as a sub-editor on East Asian media reports for the BBC Monitoring Unit at Caversham. She took evening classes in Chinese at the University of Westminster, volunteered as a writer and editor on China Now and visited China twice. She reported being determined to eat "whatever the Chinese might put in front of me" but that her gastronomic experiences were "random and haphazard". In 1994 she won a British Council scholarship for a year of postgraduate study in China where she chose to study at Sichuan University. She began as a researcher on Chinese ethnic minorities but eventually stayed on to take a three-month chef’s training course at the Sichuan Higher Institute of Cuisine.

== Career ==
Returning to London, Dunlop studied for an Area Studies master's degree at SOAS and began to review Chinese restaurants for the Time Out Eating Guide to London. Continuing to write on Chinese food for newspapers and magazines, she now worked on her first book, rejected by several publishers as "too regional" but published as Sichuan Cookery in Britain (2001) and as Land of Plenty in the United States (2003). It won the Guild of Food Writers Jeremy Round Award for a best first book.

For her next book, Revolutionary Chinese Cookbook, she looked eastwards. Hunan province is "revolutionary" as the birthplace of Mao Zedong, but Hunan cuisine, unlike that of its neighbour Sichuan, was scarcely known outside China: "Both are fertile, subtropical areas with rugged, wild terrain and rich cropland fed by major rivers, and they share robust folk cooking, big flavors and blazing hot chilies. Yet [she] argues persuasively for Hunan as a separate culinary presence", Anne Mendelson wrote in a review in The New York Times. Continuing an exploration of regional Chinese food, in "Garden of Contentment" (in The New Yorker, 2008) Dunlop profiled the Dragon Well Manor, a restaurant that is "committed to offering its guests a kind of prelapsarian Chinese cuisine" in Hangzhou, a centre of the ancient region of Jiangnan. The cookery of this same region, modern Zhejiang and Jiangsu provinces, is covered in her third regional cookbook, Land of Fish and Rice (2016). In China, she explains, this cuisine "is known historically for its extraordinary knife work, delicate flavors [and] extreme reverence for ingredients," as encapsulated in the nostalgic phrase chún lú zhī sī "thinking of perch and water shield", two ancient local specialities..

Meanwhile with Every Grain of Rice: Simple Chinese Home Cooking (2012) Dunlop gained her fourth James Beard Award. Her journalism includes frequent articles on cooking and restaurants in China for publications including the Financial Times, Saveur, Observer Food Monthly, 1843 and the now-defunct Lucky Peach and Gourmet. Her cookbooks are praised for explaining "real Chinese cooking" to cooks from elsewhere, and for identifying and highlighting local ingredients such as the bridal veil mushroom of Sichuan's "jade web soup", the fermented soy and broad bean sauce of Hunan, Zhejiang's aquatic vegetables like water bamboo and fox nuts, and the "intensely flavored cured ham from Jinhua". "Extra-culinary insights" have also been noted: she captures "fading memories of the many violent 20th-century transformations" of the Chinese provinces (quotes by Anne Mendelson). Her autobiographical memoir, Shark's Fin and Sichuan Pepper (2008), won the IACP Jane Grigson Award and the Guild of Food Writers Kate Whiteman Award. Paul Levy, in a review in The Observer, noted a "distinctive voice that marks out the very best travel writing". The focus is on her long and deep experience of Chinese cuisine, an early landmark being her visit to Qingping Market in Guangzhou in 1992, encountering "cages of badgers, cats and tapirs that are testimony to the willingness of the southern Chinese to regard most forms of life as potential food". There have been moments of doubt, as quoted in a New York Times review, "as if my gastronomic libido is slipping away ... I’ve seen the sewer-like rivers, the suppurating sores of lakes. I’ve ... breathed the toxic air and drunk the dirty water. And I’ve eaten far too much meat from endangered species". But at length, learning to think like a Chinese person and to "dispense with her own cultural taboos about eating", as Levy says, she has recognized in her own life the progression "from ‘eating to fill your belly’ (chi bao), through ‘eating plenty of rich food’ (chi hao) to ‘eating skillfully’ (chi qiao)".

== Publications ==
=== Books ===
- 2001: Sichuan Cookery (ISBN 978-0-14-029541-2)
  - US edition, 2003: Land of Plenty: a treasury of authentic Sichuan cooking (ISBN 978-0-393-05177-3)
- 2007: Revolutionary Chinese Cookbook: recipes from Hunan Province (ISBN 978-0-09-190483-8)
  - US edition, 2007: Revolutionary Chinese Cookbook: recipes from Hunan Province (ISBN 978-0-393-06222-9)
- 2008: Shark's Fin and Sichuan Pepper: a sweet-sour memoir of eating in China (ISBN 978-0-393-33288-9)
- 2012: Every Grain of Rice: Simple Chinese Home Cooking (ISBN 978-1-4088-0252-6)
- 2016: Land of Fish and Rice: Recipes from the Culinary Heart of China (ISBN 978-1-4088-0251-9)
  - US edition, 2017: Land of Fish and Rice: Recipes from the Culinary Heart of China (ISBN 978-0-393-25438-9)
- 2019: The Food of Sichuan (ISBN 978-1-324-00483-7)
- 2023: Invitation to a Banquet: The Story of Chinese Food (ISBN 978-0-393-86713-8)
- 2026: Five Tastes: The Magic of Flavour in a Chinese Kitchen (ISBN 9780241517000)

=== Selected articles ===
- 2001: "'On the first day they gave me a chef's hat and my own cleaver...'" in The Observer (10 June 2001)
- 2008: "Unsavoury characters" in Financial Times (16 August 2008) (on the political pressure to give English names to Chinese dishes)
- 2008: "Letter from China: Garden of Contentment" in The New Yorker vol. 84 no. 38 (24 November 2008) pp. 54–61
- 2013: "London Town" in Lucky Peach (30 April 2013) (on London's Chinatown)
- 2014: "Dick Soup" in Lucky Peach (14 April 2014) another source
- 2018: "Fuchsia Dunlop on the fiery charms of Sichuan hotpot" in Financial Times (9 November 2018)
