= Sichuan Cookery =

Cookbook by Fuchsia Dunlop

Sichuan Cookery, published in the United States as Land of Plenty: A Treasury of Authentic Sichuan Cooking, is a 2001 cook book by Fuchsia Dunlop. It was published in the United States by W. W. Norton.

A new edition of the book, The Food of Sichuan, was published in 2019. This edition was published in the United Kingdom by Bloomsbury. Within China, a Mandarin translation was later published.

While Dunlop was in China, a friend from Denmark told her that she should author a book after seeing her copy down recipes. Dunlop decided to pursue this goal since she perceived the Western market for Chinese cookbooks to lack any "researched on the ground" type works. She made proposals to publish the book on two occasions, finding a publisher on the second try. On the first one, publishers felt that the version was not focused broadly enough.

Susan Jung of the South China Morning Post wrote that the original 2001 book "established Fuchsia Dunlop as the English-writing authority on Sichuanese cuisine." Publishers Weekly gave the 2003 American edition a starred review and stated that "the book is a pleasure—both to cook from and to read." Jay Rayner of The Guardian described the 2019 edition as "a detailed, sometimes nerdy, often romantic guide-cum-travelogue through" Sichuan cuisine.
