= Hangzhou City Wall =

Former city wall of Hangzhou, China

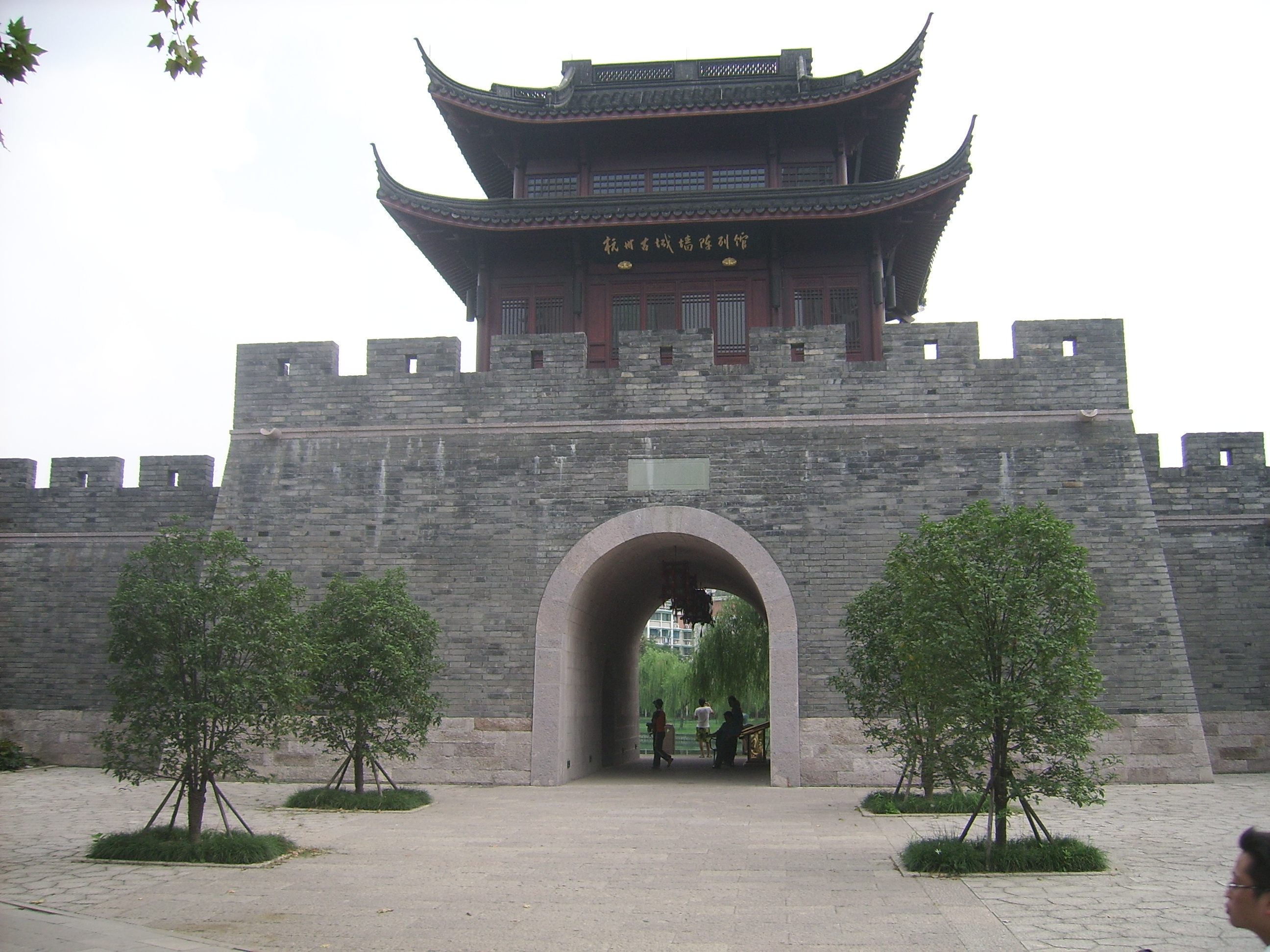
The reconstructed Qingchun Gate, now used as the Hangzhou City Wall Museum.

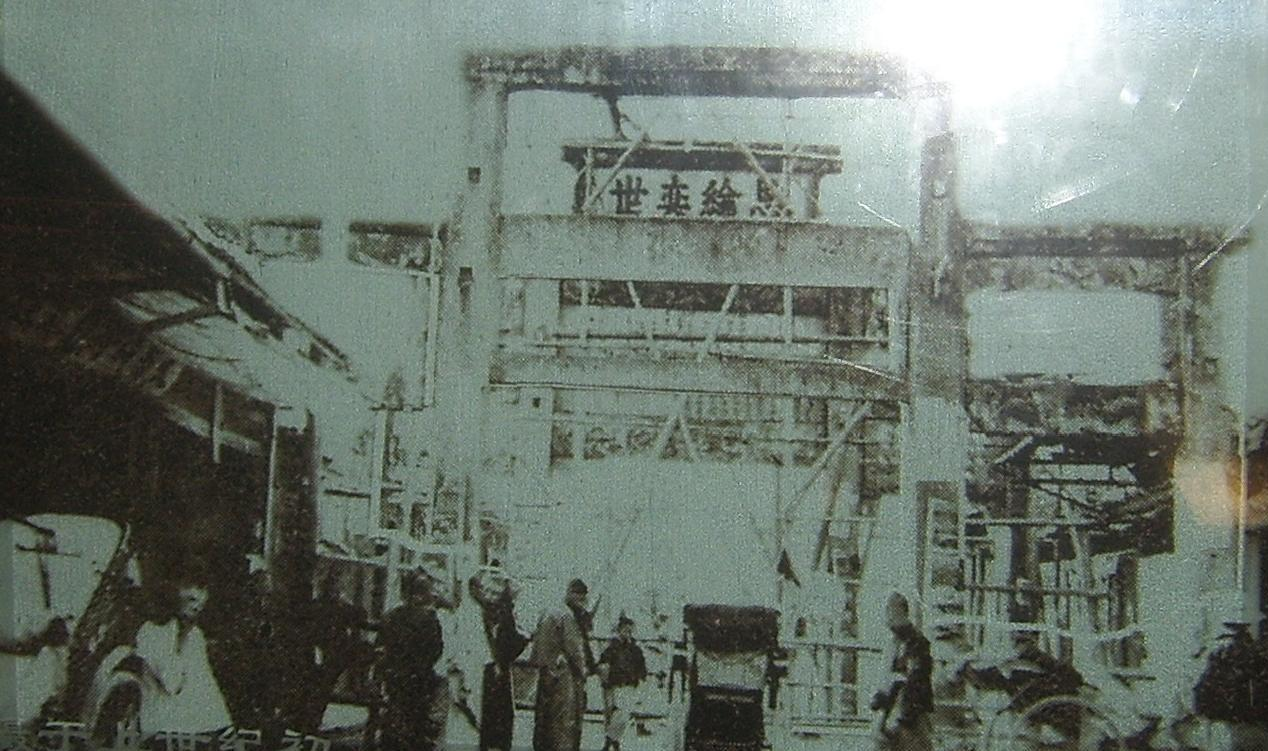
The dismantling of Wulin Gate in 1922

The Hangzhou City Wall was the city wall that once surrounded Hangzhou during the medieval and early modern periods of imperial China. Despite being the most populous city in the world during the Song and early Yuan dynasties, the historic city was much smaller than the borders of the present Hangzhou Municipality and only surrounded the districts immediately east of West Lake in the present city's urban core. The walls were largely dismantled in the early 20th century and what remains has largely been rebuilt and maintained as tourist attractions, but they were a significant part of Hangzhou's historical urban identity and the wall's course and gates are still evidenced by many aspects of modern Hangzhou's design and place names.

== History ==
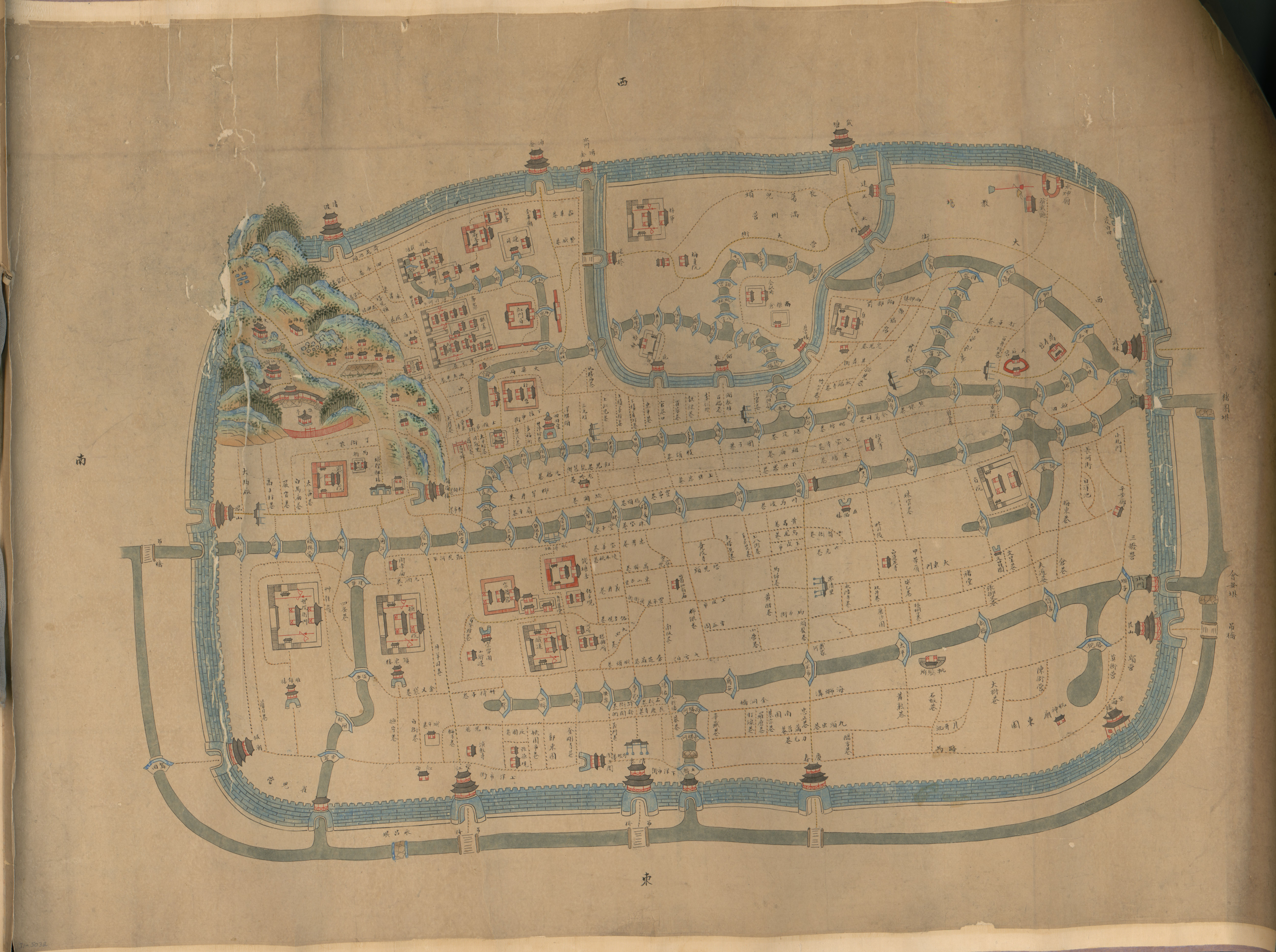
A Chinese map of the city, its walls, and its canal system shortly after its reconquest from the Taiping rebels (1867)

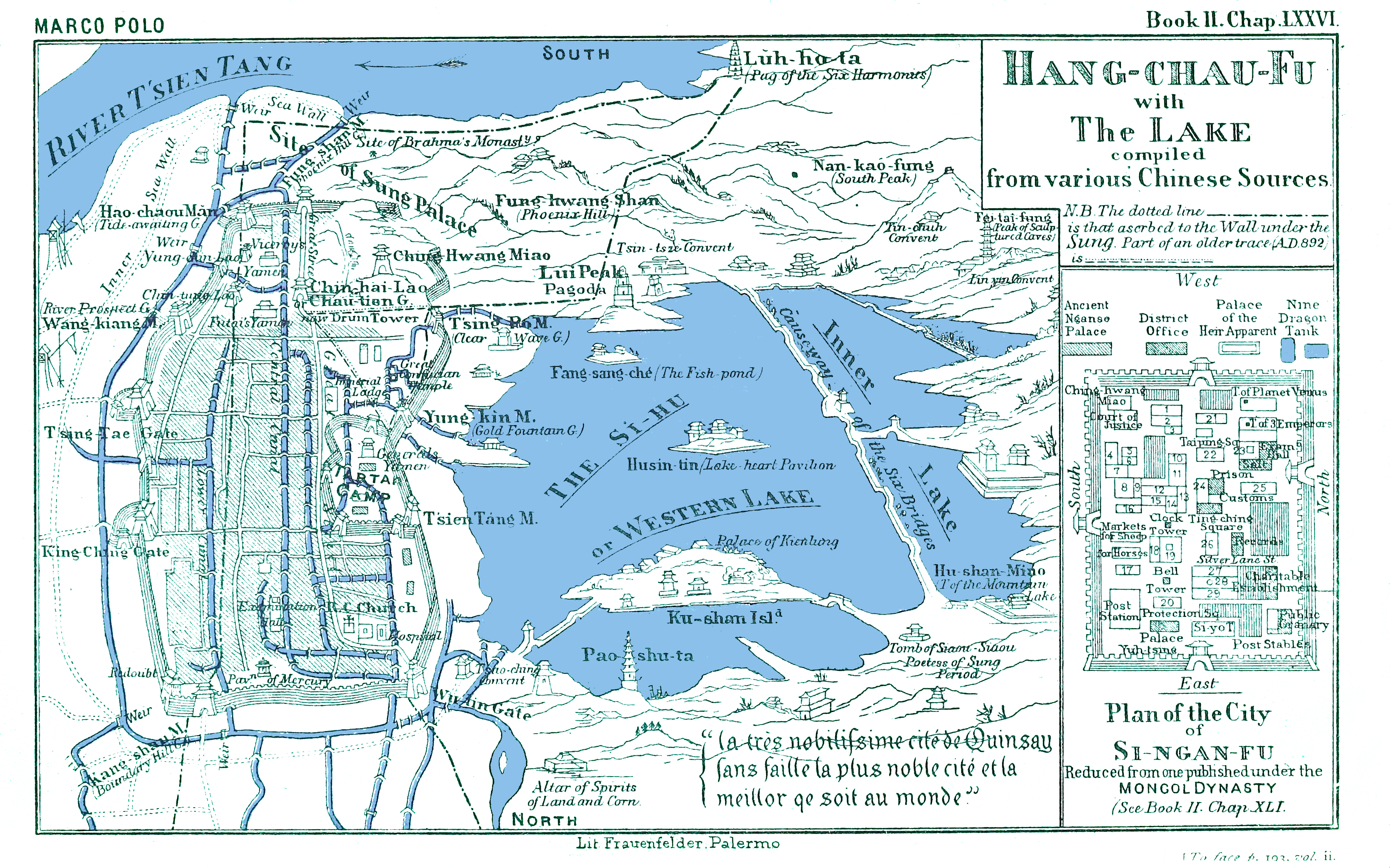
An English map of the city, including the outer wall's main gates, c. 1903

Hangzhou was first made a prefectural capital near the end of the Southern Chen dynasty, immediately before its conquest by the Sui. The Sui renamed the prefecture but maintained its organization, erecting Hangzhou's first city walls in the 11th year of the Wen Emperor (ad 591). Its perimeter at the time was reported as 36 li and 90 paces (roughly 16.8 km or 10.4 mi). The course of this wall was roughly along Zhonghe Road (中河路) on the east, turning west on the north end at about the location of Hangzhou's No. 6 Park (六公园), turning south near the eastern shore of West Lake, and turning back east along the northern slopes of Phoenix Hill. Wu Hill (吴山) was excluded by an indent in the course of the wall.

Under the Qing, the city wall was 9 m (30 ft) high and 11 m (35 ft) wide across the top. It restricted views of West Lake to "Chenghuang Hill" (城隍山), the era's name for Wu Hill, and the three western gates. 7000 mu (roughly 430 ha or 1,100 acres) of the central city were also separately walled off to create a Manchu district and banner garrison; this wall was 6 m (20 ft) high and had 5 gates of its own in addition to the Qiantang Gate. Litters passing through the Manchu gates were routinely searched, prompting most Han residents and visitors to use the other 2 western gates to access the lake. During the Taiping occupation of Hangzhou in the early 1860s, the city walls trapped the residents and allowed the Qing army to restrict supplies during their siege, leading to an estimated 600,000 deaths.

The walls of the Manchu garrison were demolished in 1912.

== Present condition ==
In 1994, Hangzhou erected memorial plaques at the locations of the Qing city wall's ten main gates: Wulin Gate (武林門), Genshan Gate (艮山門), Fengshan Gate (鳳山門), Qingtai Gate (清泰門), Wangjiang Gate (望江門), Houchao Gate (候潮門), Qingbo Gate (清波門), Yongjin Gate (湧金門), Qiantang Gate (錢塘門), and Qingchun Gate (慶春門).

The reconstructed Qingchun Gate now serves as the Hangzhou Ancient City Wall Museum or Exhibition Hall, located at 1 Qingchun Road (庆春路1号). It opened on 4 February 2008 after two years of rebuilding and now covers an area of 450 m^{2} (0.11 acres). The wall was restored to its Qing size and style but with a Song-era xieshanding fortification atop the wall.

The Fengshan Water Gate has also been maintained and refurbished as part of the Grand Canal World Heritage sites, owing to its importance guarding the connection between the Jiangnan Canal (the southeastern stretch of the Grand Canal) with the Qiantang River and East Zhejiang Canal beyond. It is one of two Chinese water gates thus given international protected status, along with the Panmen Gate in Suzhou.

== See also ==
- Timeline of Hangzhou
