= List of hills in Hangzhou =

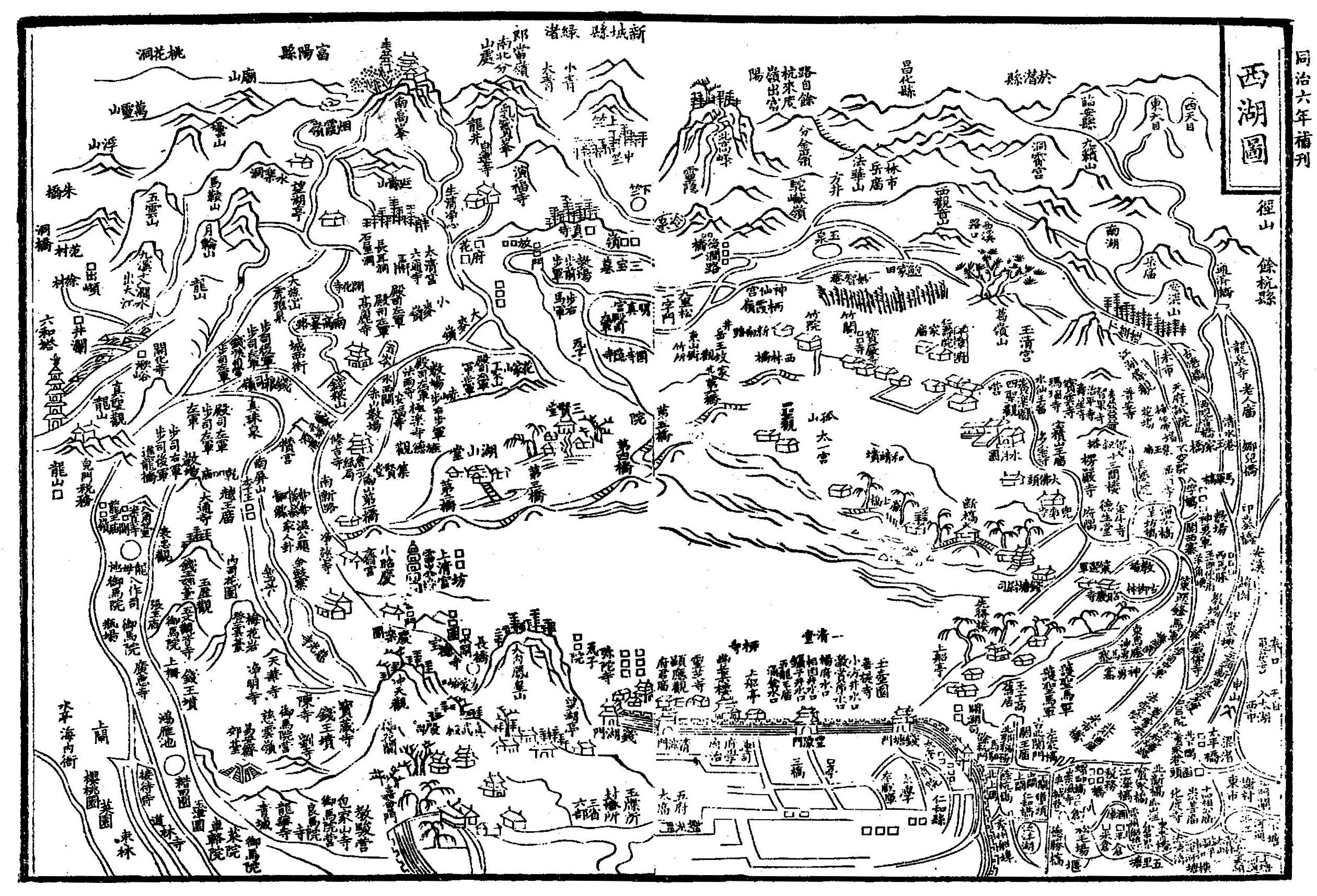
The Map of West Lake from a Qing reprint of Qian Yueyou's c. 1270 Records of Lin'an in the Xianchun Era (Xianchun Lin'an Zhi), showing many of the hills around Hangzhou

This is a list of hills in Hangzhou, the capital of China's Zhejiang Province.

Usual English Name	Chinese Name		Pinyin	Translation	Notes
Usual English Name	Trad.	Simp.	Pinyin	Translation	Notes
Baoshi Hill	寶石山	宝石山	Bǎoshí Shān	Gemstone Hill	Site of Baochu Pagoda
Beigao Peak	北高峰		Běigāo Fēng	Northern High Peak	
Chessboard Hill	棋盤山	棋盘山	Qípán Shān	Chessboard Hill	
Daci Hill	大慈山		Dàcí Shān	Hill of Great Compassion	
Dahua Hill	大華山	大华山	Dàhuà Shān	Hill of Great Splendor	
Dingjia Hill	丁家山		Dīngjiā Shān	Family Reunion Hill	
Feilaifeng	飛來峰	飞来峰	Fēilái Fēng	Flying Hither Peak	Famed for the Buddhist rock art beside Lingyin Temple
Geling Hill	葛嶺山	葛岭山	Gélǐng Shān	Kudzu Peak Hill	
General Hill	將軍山	将军山	Jiāngjūn Shān	Hill of the General(s)	
Huangshan	黃山	黄山	Huáng Shān	Yellow Hill	
Hupaohou Hill	虎跑後山	虎跑后山	Hǔpǎo Hòushān	Hill behind Tiger Spring	Site of Dreaming of the Tiger Spring
Jinjia Hill	金家山		Jīnjiā Shān	Golden Family Hill	
Jiuyao Hill	九曜山		Jiǔyào Shān	Navagraha Hill	
Jiangtai Hill	將台山	将台山	Jiāngtái Shān		
Lion Hill	獅子山	狮子山	Shīzǐ Shān	Lion Hill	
Lingfeng Hill	靈峰山	灵峰山	Língfēng Shān	Spirit Peak Hill	
Mantou Hill	饅頭山	馒头山	Mántou Shān	Mantou Hill	
Nangao Peak	南高峰		Nángāo Fēng	Southern High Peak	Site of the 3 Tianzhu temples
Nanping Hill	南屏山		Nánpíng Shān	Southern Screen Hill	Site of "Night Bell on Nanping Hill", one of Hangzhou's Ten Scenes
Phoenix Hill	鳳凰山	凤凰山	Fènghuáng Shān	Phoenix Hill	
Qinglong Hill	青龍山	青龙山	Qīnglóng Shān	Verdant Dragon Hill	
Shouxintou	壽星頭	寿星头	Shòuxingtóu	Hill of the God of Longevity	
Trunk Peak	象鼻山		Xiàngbí Shān	Elephant Trunk Hill	
Tianma Hill	天馬山	天马山	Tiānmǎ Shān	Celestial Horse Hill	
Wu Hill	吳山	吴山	Wú Shān	Suzhou Hill	Site of the former City God Temple
Wulao Peak	五老峰		Wǔlǎo Fēng	Five Old Men Peaks	
Wuyun Hill	五雲山	五云山	Wǔyún Shān	Hill of the Five Clouds	
Yuegui Peak	月桂峰		Yuèguì Fēng	Lunar Osmanthus Peak	
Yuhuang Hill	玉皇山		Yùhuáng Shān	Jade Emperor Hill	
Ziyang Hill	紫陽山	紫阳山	Zǐyáng Shān	Hill of Purple Yang	
