= Zhejiang Museum of Natural History =

Museum in Hangzhou, China

- 浙江自然博物馆
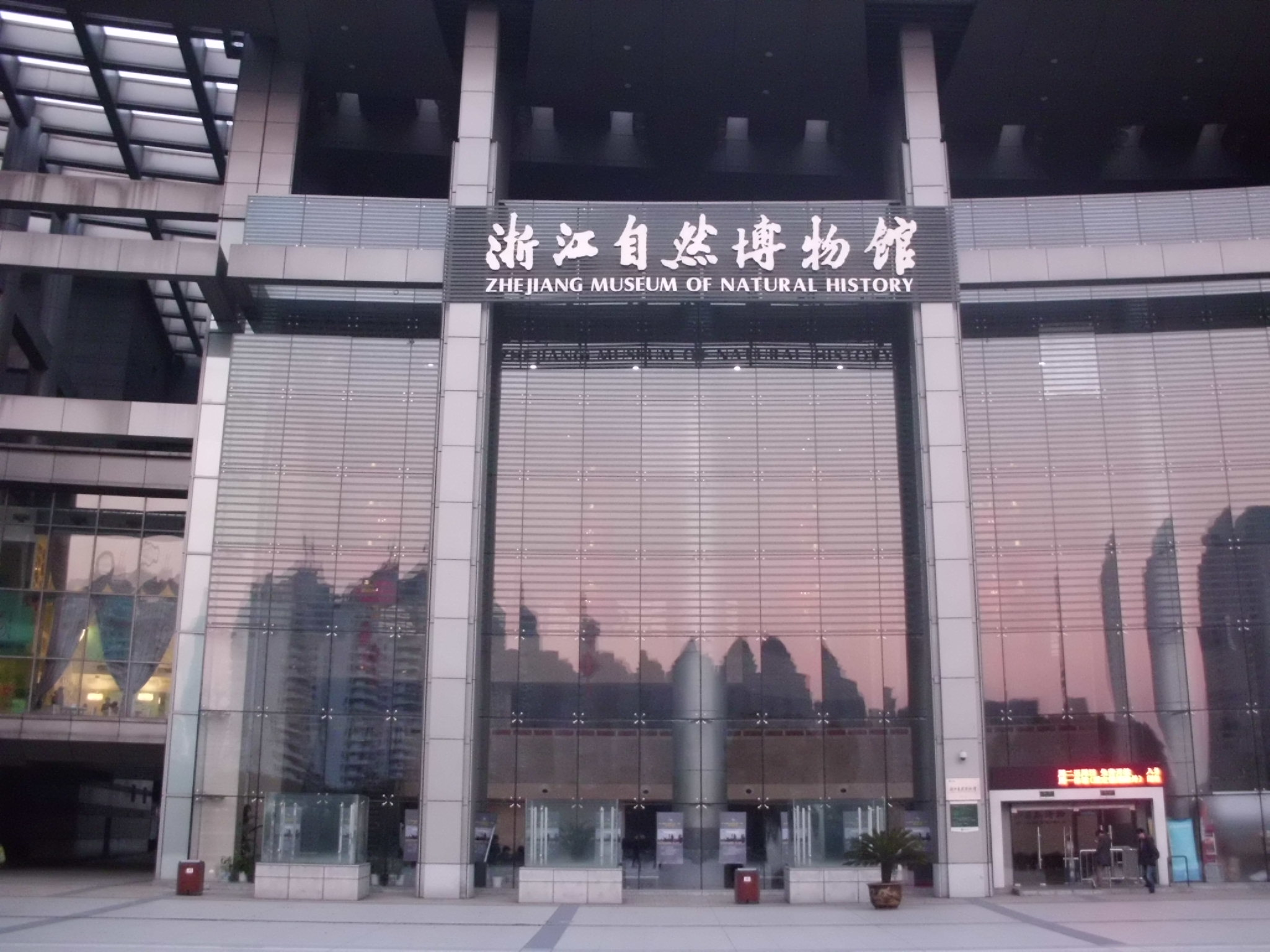
- Hangzhou branch entrance

- Location within Zhejiang Location within China
- Established: 1929; 97 years ago
- Location: 6 West Lake Cultural Square, Hangzhou, Zhejiang, China
- Coordinates: 30°16′44″N 120°9′34″E
- Type: Natural history museum
- Visitors: 1 million (2010)
- Director: Yan Hongming
- Website: zmnh.com

The Zhejiang Museum of Natural History (Chinese: 浙江自然博物馆) is the provincial natural history museum of the Zhejiang province in China. The Hangzhou branch is located in the West Lake Cultural Square in Hangzhou, which also houses the Wulin building of Zhejiang Provincial Museum, and the Zhejiang Museum of Science and Technology.

The museum exhibits specimens of natural history, and is home to life science and earth science specimens compromising some 200,000 items at the Hangzhou branch. The museum also provides research and education.

== History ==
In 1929, the West Lake Exposition was held in Hangzhou, which included departments of aquatic products, plants, animals, insects, precious stones, mining products and a zoo. The exposition initiated a petition to the provincial government which resulted in the foundation of the West Lake Museum to keep the museum-suitable exhibits.

After the founding of the People's Republic of China, the name was changed to Zhejiang Museum in 1953. In 1984, the natural history department became an independent natural history museum under its current name. After funding issues during this time, the functional operation of the museum was restricted. Although, several years in advance, a warehouse to house the museum's collections was constructed in 1991, and the exhibition hall was built in 1998.

In 2009, the Hangzhou branch was completed and opened to the public.

In 2018, the Anji branch was opened in Anji County.

== See also ==
- List of museums in China
