= Invitation to a Banquet =

2023 book by Fuchsia Dunlop

Invitation to a Banquet: The Story of Chinese Food is a 2023 book by Fuchsia Dunlop, published by W. W. Norton & Company in the United States and by Particular Books in the United Kingdom. The book explores the origins, ingredients, techniques, and philosophies of Chinese cuisine through thirty dishes. Drawing on thirty years of research into Chinese culinary history and firsthand fieldwork, it stands as a milestone tribute to Chinese food culture.

== Development ==
Dunlop decided to write another book during the heightened phases of the COVID-19 pandemic as Dunlop was not able to visit China because of rules enacted there barring travel.

== Contents ==
There are 28 chapters, with each about a particular dish or food production facility and a history around the subject. These chapters are arranged in four groups: "Hearth," "Farm," "Kitchen," and "Table." Each section, respectively, is about the history of food, the ingredients, about styles of cooking, and what Bone describes as a "grab bag". The page count is 480. There are a total of 30 dishes chronicled in the work.

At times, Dunlop criticizes previous stigma against Chinese cuisine in the West.

== Reception ==
Luke Tsai of KQED wrote that the book is "a meandering, often philosophical exploration of what Chinese food culture actually is" rather than a cookbook. Eugenia Bone of The Wall Street Journal wrote that the work was made "to help outsiders appreciate Chinese food culture more generally."

Dwight Garner of The New York Times described the work as "a serious and intrepid work of culinary history".

According to Bone, the book is "a joyously sensual, deeply researched and unabashedly chauvinistic read". Bone stated, in regards to the "Table" section, that some of its contents are "illuminating".

Isabel Wilson of The Financial Times described the work as "erudite".

Bee Wilson of The Times wrote that the work "is an erudite joy that makes you yearn to taste the delights Dunlop describes". According to Wilson, "Occasionally Dunlop's advocacy for Chinese food can feel one-sided."

Tim Lewis of The Observer wrote that in this book, the author's "desire to educate and enlighten finds its fullest expression".
