= Martyn Crucefix =

British poet, translator and reviewer (born 1956)

Martyn Crucefix (born 1956 in Trowbridge, Wiltshire) is a British poet, translator and reviewer. He is published predominantly by Enitharmon Press. His themes encompass questions of history and identity (particularly in the 1997 collection A Madder Ghost) and – influenced by his translations of Rainer Maria Rilke – more recent work focuses on the transformations of imagination and momentary epiphanies.

== Poetry ==
Crucefix has won numerous prizes including an Eric Gregory Award and a Hawthornden Fellowship. Among his collections are: Beneath Tremendous Rain (Enitharmon, 1990); At the Mountjoy Hotel (Enitharmon, 1993); On Whistler Mountain (Sinclair-Stevenson, 1994); A Madder Ghost (Enitharmon, 1997); An English Nazareth (Enitharmon, 2004); Hurt (Enitharmon, 2010). His translation of Rainer Maria Rilke's Duino Elegies (Enitharmon, 2006) was shortlisted for the 2007 Popescu Prize for European Poetry Translation and described as "unlikely to be bettered for very many years" (Magma) and by the Popescu judges as "a milestone of translation and a landmark in European poetry".

An early selection of Crucefix's work secured an Eric Gregory Award in 1984 and appeared in The Gregory Poems: The Best of the Young British Poets 1983–84, edited and chosen by John Fuller and Howard Sergeant. His first book, Beneath Tremendous Rain (Enitharmon, 1990) was published two years after he had been featured by Peter Forbes in a "New British Poets" edition of Poetry Review. This collection contains his elegy for his friend, the poet and food writer, Jeremy Round, as well as the four-part poem "Water Music" and an extended meditation on language, love and history titled "Rosetta". For Herbert Lomas the book showed "Great intelligence and subtlety . . . clearly an outstanding talent from whom great things can be expected". Anne Stevenson wrote: "Poetry these days, often feels obliged to place conscience over art and make language work for precision, not complexity. In Martyn Crucefix's first collection, something else happens . . . daring to break with secular convention, Crucefix will become a real artist".

During a Hawthornden Fellowship in 1990, Crucefix completed the long poem, "At The Mountjoy Hotel", which won second prize in the Arvon Poetry Competition 1991, and was published as a short-run pamphlet by Enitharmon in 1993. It was included in Crucefix's second collection, On Whistler Mountain (Sinclair-Stevenson, 1994), opening the book which contained a second long narrative poem, "On Whistler Mountain". This second piece carries the dates New Year 1991 – New Year 1993 and splices putative personal events with material from the First Gulf War, in particular the "turkey-shoot" of the US air attack on Iraqi forces on the highway north of Al Jahra. Poetry Review thought the book proved Crucefix "one of the most mature voices of the 1990s" and it was praised by Tim Liardet: "Crucefix is at his best, bringing physical truths faithfully into an intense focus whilst remaining alive to their more outlandish implications, their capacity for dream-making . . . . tendering poems of love and desire with great delicacy of gesture and movement . . . blending an earthy sensuality with fine cerebral observation". Alan Brownjohn, writing in The Sunday Times characterised it as a "substantial and rewarding collection . . . highly wrought, ambitious, thoughtful".

A third collection, A Madder Ghost (Enitharmon, 1997), drew on material unearthed in genealogical research ten years earlier. This had found Crucefix's ancestors to be of Huguenot origins, fleeing France in the 1780s to settle in Spitalfields, London, to continue the family trade of clock-making. The book's tripartite structure opens and closes with sequences of lyrics in which he explores the anxieties and anticipated pleasures of fatherhood, from conception through the first year of his son's life. Genealogical material forms the middle section and looks to the past for identity, continuity and new ways of understanding the present in a tour de force of narrative interweaving that Vrona Groarke described as "a brave experiment . . . allowing two languages distanced by history and syntax, to swim together in single poems". The book was praised by Anne Stevenson: "It is rare these days to find a book of poems that is so focused, so carefully shaped and so moving". Kathryn Maris also praised it as "urgent, heartfelt, controlled and masterful" and Gillian Allnutt thought the poems timely in their engagement with "proactive fatherhood" in ways that were "tender, humorous and . . . profound".

== Original poetry collections ==
- Our Weird Regiment (Shearsman Books, 2026)
- Walking Away (Dare-Gale Press, 2025)
- Between a Drowning Man (Salt Publishing, 2023)
- Cargo of Limbs (Hercules Editions, 2019)
- The Lovely Disciplines (Seren Books, 2017)
- O. at the Edge of the Gorge (Guillemot Press, 2017)
- A Convoy (If a Leaf Falls Press, 2017)
- A Hatfield Mass (Worple Press, 2014)
- The Time We Turned (Shearsman Books, 2014)
- Hurt (Enitharmon Press, 2010)
- An English Nazareth (Enitharmon Press, 2004)
- A Madder Ghost (Enitharmon Press, 1997)
- On Whistler Mountain (Sinclair-Stevenson, 1994)
- At The Mountjoy Hotel (Enitharmon Press, 1993)
- Beneath Tremendous Rain (Enitharmon Press, 1990)

== Translations ==
- Dream of Glass – translations of Angèle Paoli (Muscaliet Press, 2025)
- Change Your Life, selected translations of Rilke’s poetry (Pushkin Press, 2024)
- In Case of Loss, translations of essays by Lutz Seiler (And Other Stories, 2023)
- These Numbered Days, poems by Peter Huchel (Shearsman Books, 2019)
- Daodejing – a new version in English (Enitharmon Press, 2016)
- Rilke's Sonnets to Orpheus (Enitharmon Press, 2012)
- Rilke's Duino Elegies (Enitharmon Press, 2006)

== Poems on the web ==
- Audio Recording made at The South Bank Centre in 2012.
- Two poems from "Essays in Island Logic" (from Hurt)
- Three poems from "Essays in Island Logic" (from Hurt) with accompanying essay
- "He considers what the young have to teach" (from Hurt)
- "Water-lily" (from Hurt)
- "While There is War" (with audio) (from Hurt)
- "Growth of a poet's mind" (from Hurt)
- "Invocation" (from Hurt)
- "Ivy tunnel at Kenwood" (uncollected)
- "Road" (uncollected)
- "On foot" (uncollected)
- "La Bastide-de-Bousignac" and "Morning Song" (uncollected)
- "Tortoise" (from An English Nazareth)
