= Shark's Fin and Sichuan Pepper =

2008 book by Fuchsia Dunlop

Shark's Fin and Sichuan Pepper: A Sweet-Sour Memoir of Eating in China
- Author: Fuchsia Dunlop
- Language: English
- Publication date: 2008

Shark's Fin and Sichuan Pepper: A Sweet-Sour Memoir of Eating in China is a 2008 book by Fuchsia Dunlop. It is a memoir that describes her interactions with Chinese cuisine whilst in China.

== Release ==
There are two translations in Standard Mandarin. It was published in 2017 in Taiwan in Traditional Chinese. The Simplified Chinese translation of this work, by Shanghai Translation Publishing House and released in July 2018, was the first book by Dunlop to be published in Mainland China. By October 2018 there were 50,000 copies and four reprints. He Yujia (Chinese: 何雨珈) is the translator of the Mainland China edition, which is titled 鱼翅与花椒.

== Reception ==
Dawn Drzal of The New York Times wrote that due to the variety of ingredients chronicled, the work "sometimes reads like a bill of lading for dismembered occupants of Noah's Ark".

Publishers Weekly described the work as "supple and affectionate" and called attention to how the book chronicled China during the reform and opening up period. Kirkus Reviews wrote that the book is a "satisfying history".

According to Dunlop, the Chinese publication had a positive reception.
