= Jeremy Round =

Cookery writer and journalist for The Independent newspaper

Jeremy Round (1957–1989) was a cookery writer and journalist for The Independent newspaper, which has been praised by food lovers such as Elizabeth David and Marco Pierre White. The only book he published before his death in 1989 was The Independent Cook. It was re-issued in 2001 and chosen as 38th in the 50 best cookbooks of all time as selected by The Observer Food Monthly team (Jay Rayner, Bill Buford, Rachel Cooke and Allan Jenkins) in 2010

In August 1999, The Independent celebrated Round's work by publishing many admiring comments from the world of cooking. Amongst these were Raymond Blanc: "he was an extremely serious food writer. He was not only interested in restaurants, but also supermarkets, the food chain, all food issues. He was very interested in bringing the consumer to be far more critical and demanding. He criticised in a very honest way, but was never blunt. He had such a passion for food that he could easily deconstruct the food itself. Few critics can do that." Clarissa Dickson Wright: "He was the bearer of the food torch which passed from Elizabeth David to Jane Grigson to him. Usually there's one person who's head and shoulders above his contemporaries, and he was that one. And I'm not saying that just because he's dead. No one matched his eclecticism and wit, his wicked humour. I still use his book Independent Cook and I will not lend it to anyone - I'm paranoid someone will nick it"; Marco Pierre White: "He was a rare man - he hasn't been replaced. His knowledge was first rate and he was a great all-rounder. He was very unusual in that he would be writing an article, for example about endive, and he'd ring me up and say "tell me three or four things that you'd do with endive" -a perfect example of his professionalism and humility. He was a critic and food journalist with a tremendous amount of integrity".

The Guild of Food Writers Awards (established in 1996) continues to present in his memory the Jeremy Round Award for Best First Book in recognition of outstanding achievements in food writing and broadcasting.

Before his meteoric rise as a cookery writer, Round also wrote poetry. He was a member of the group of writers meeting at the Old Fire Station Theatre in Oxford in the mid-1980s. Alan Davidson remembered "his wit, often self-deprecatory. And what I chose to represent him, with his warm approval, in an anthology of writing about food was a poem ["Utopia"] he wrote on realising, from something Paul Levy had written, that he had hitherto been part of the vulgar herd who did not know that tea is seldom drunk with food in China. The poet Martyn Crucefix celebrates Round as friend, poet and cook in 'In Memory of Jeremy Round' from the collection Beneath Tremendous Rain (Enitharmon Press, 1990).

Jeremy Round was an old boy of Palmer's College in Thurrock, Essex.
