= West Lake Cultural Square =

Square in Hangzhou, China

Coordinates: 30.27643°N 120.16490°E

West Lake Cultural Square (Chinese: 西湖文化广场; pinyin: Xīhú Wénhuà Guǎngchǎng) is a square in the Xiacheng District of Hangzhou, China. It was built in 2002 and it covers an area of 36,000 m. It is used for science and performing arts exhibitions, entertainment, leisure, and also has a business centre. The ninth tallest building in Hangzhou is located at the square. It houses the Wulin building of the Zhejiang Provincial Museum, the Zhejiang Museum of Natural History, and the Zhejiang Museum of Science and Technology. It is served by West Lake Cultural Square Station of the Hangzhou Metro.

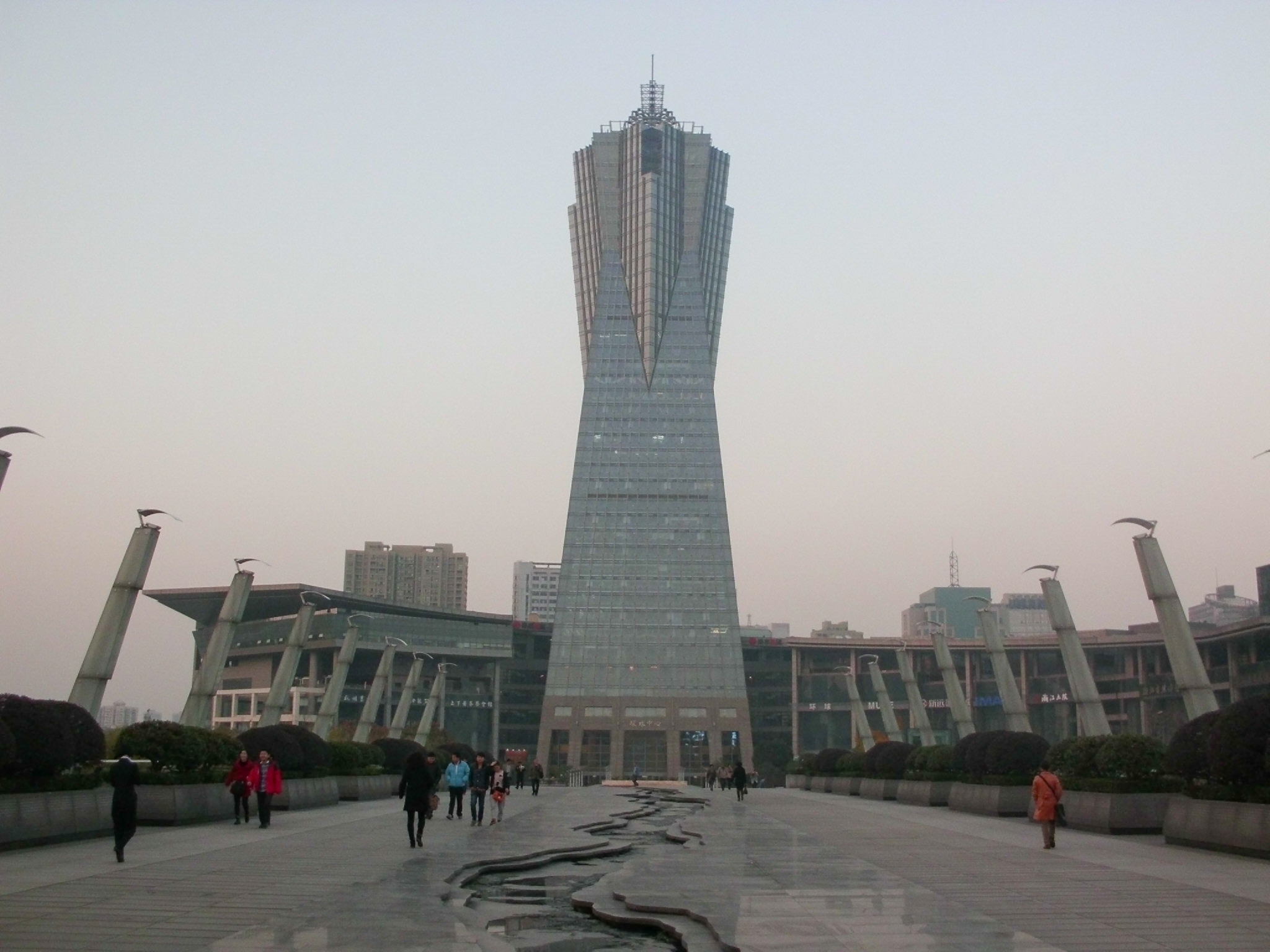
Global Centre building

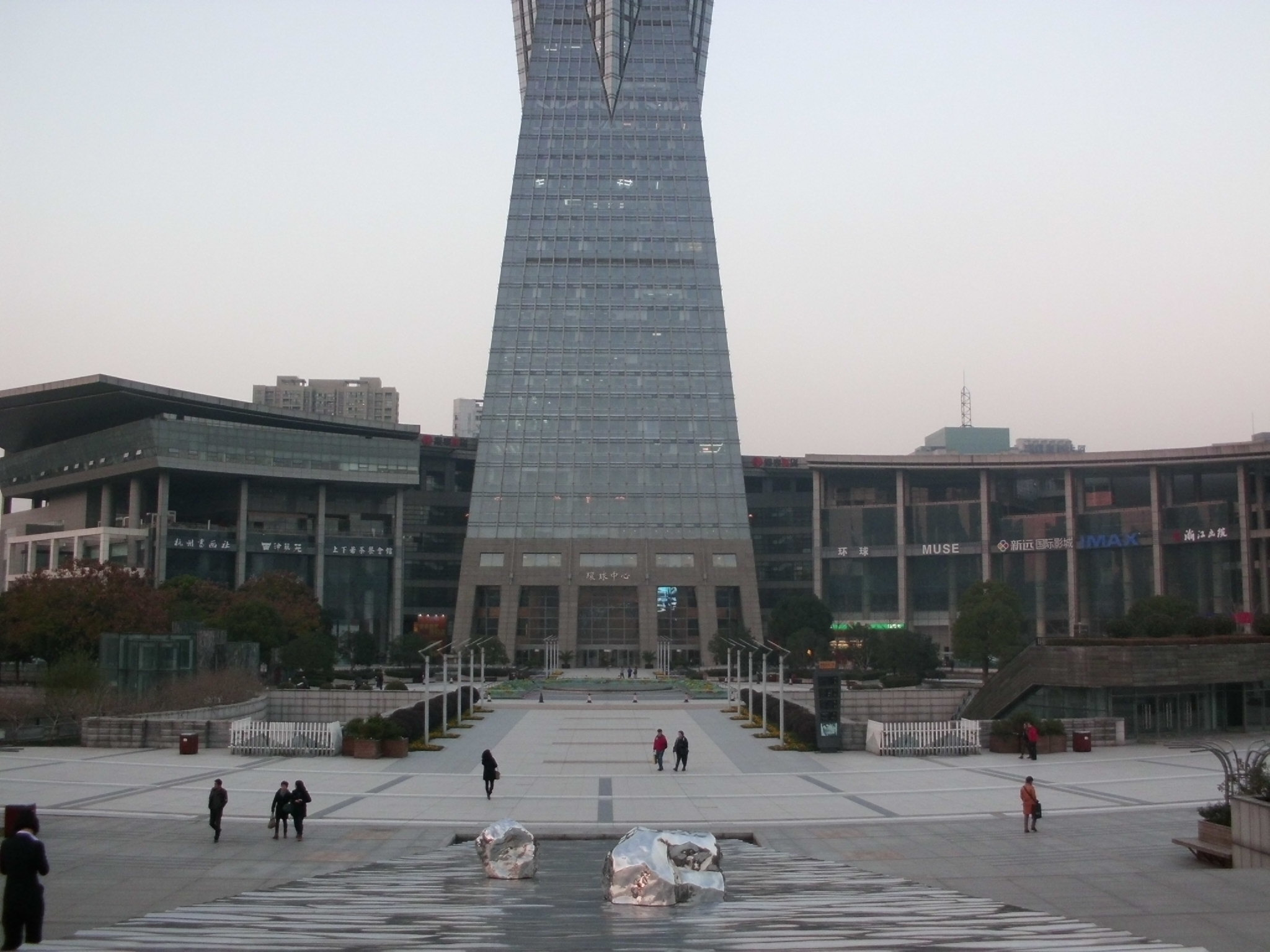

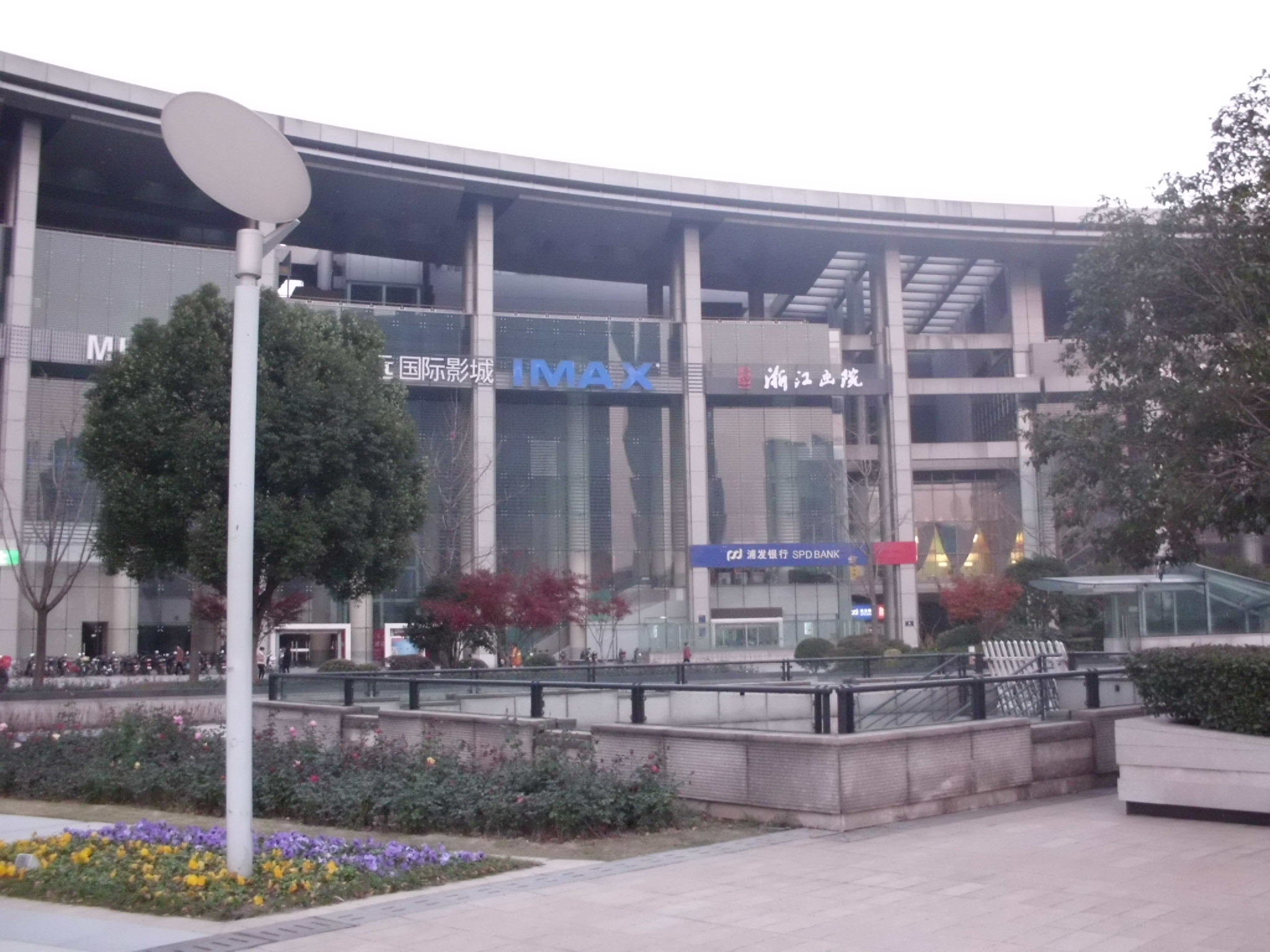

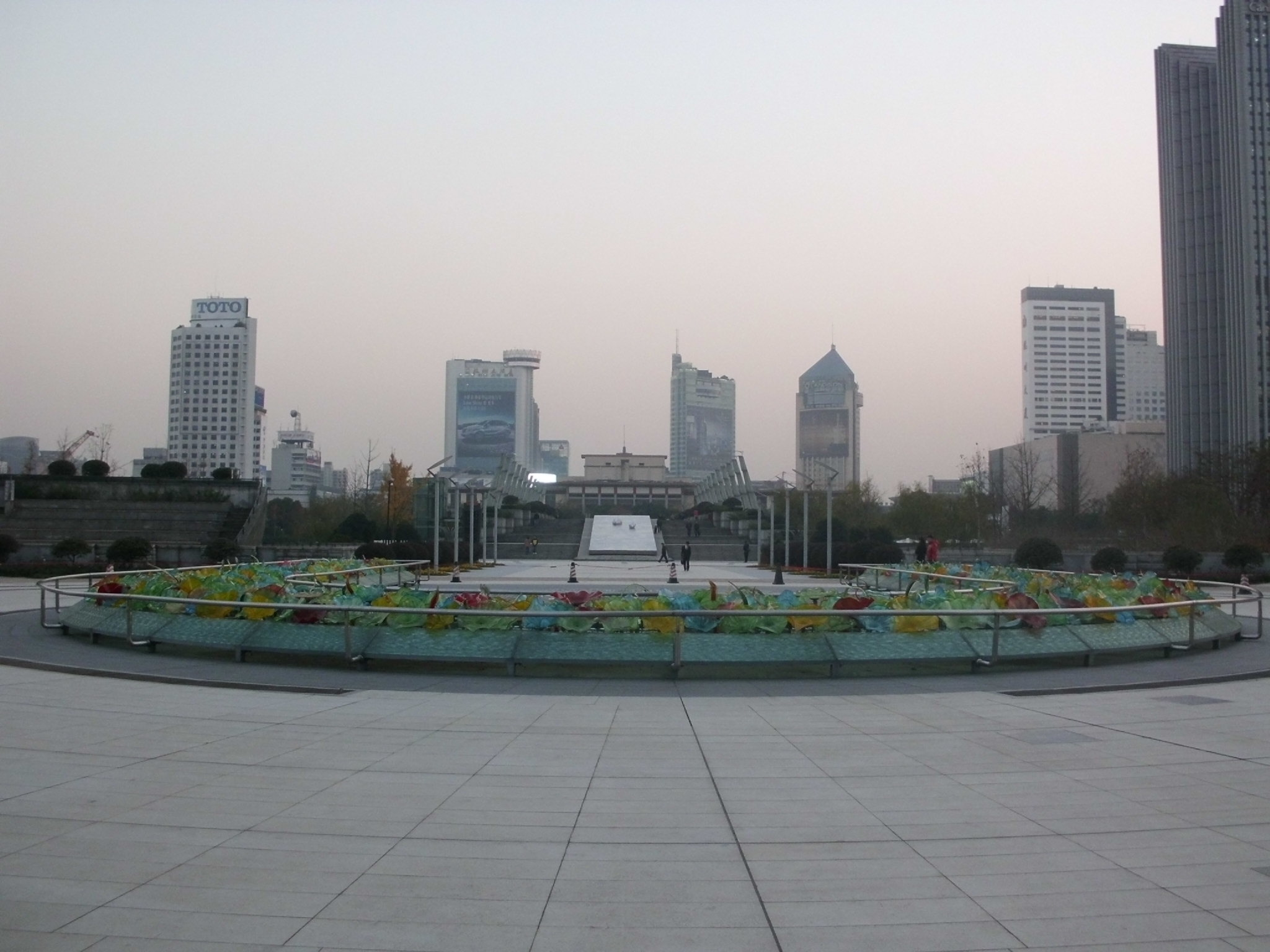
View to the south
