= Dragon Well Manor =

Restaurant in Hangzhou, China

Coordinates: 30.227146°N 120.110779°E

Dragon Well Manor (龙井草堂, pinyin Lóngjǐng Cǎotáng) is a restaurant in Hangzhou, Zhejiang province, China preparing and serving food based on the ideals of sustainable slow food, serving seasonal produce sourced from local purveyors. In 2010, the owner Dai Jianjun has been awarded a medal by Terra Madre organization for his contributions to preserving traditionally made and sourced food in the increasingly industrialized China.

It is noted for the attention to natural ingredients, and the insistence of maintaining Chinese culinary tradition. According to The New Yorker, "it has a devoted following among Zhejiang's public figures and wealthy businessmen." One of its best known dishes is wuming yingxiong (无名英雄), made by boiling a stock from smaller crucian carp in the manner of bouillabaisse and then poaching the serving fish in this broth.
