= Baochu Pagoda =

Pagoda in Hangzhou, China

Coordinates: 30°15′48″N 120°8′37″E

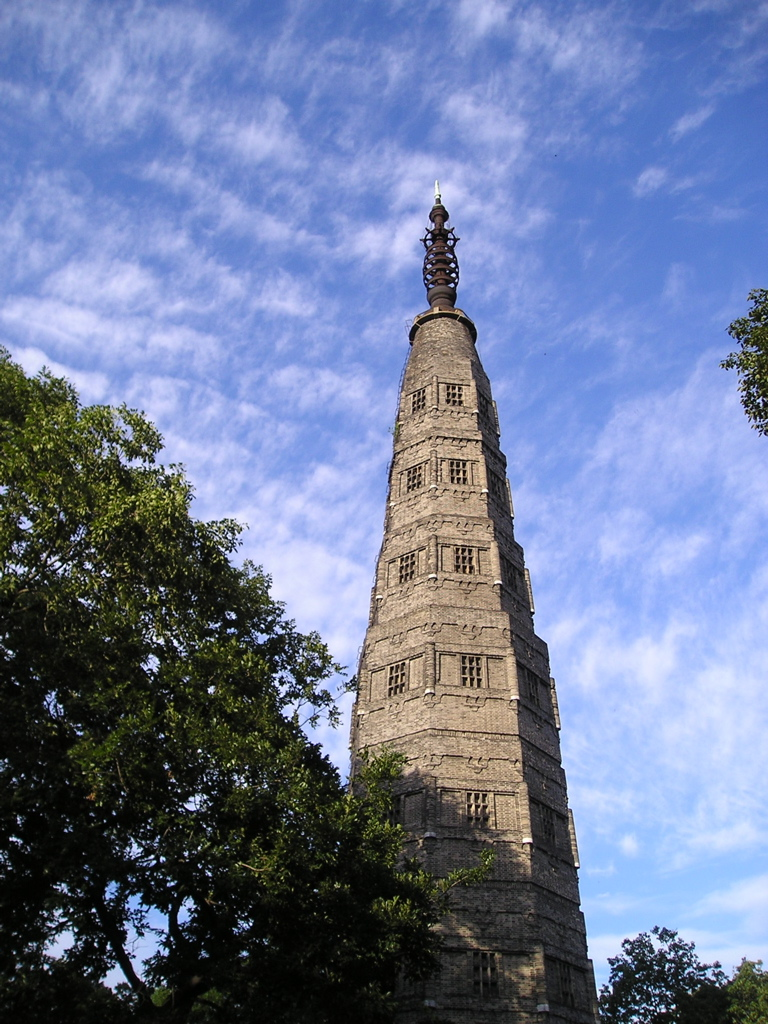
Baochu Pagoda

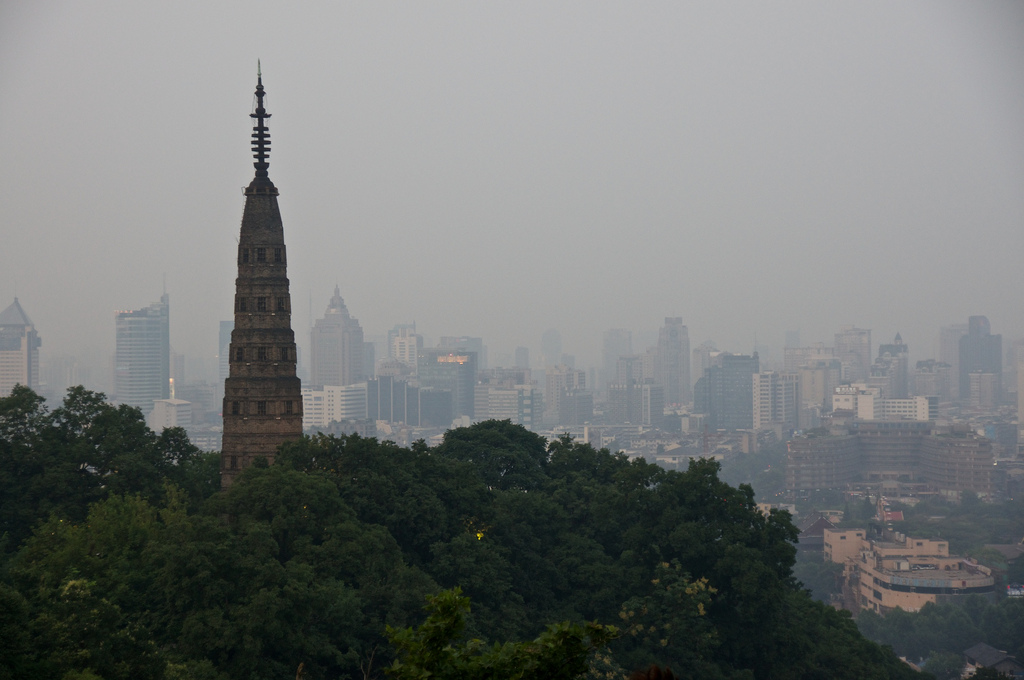
Baochu Pagoda, Hangzhou

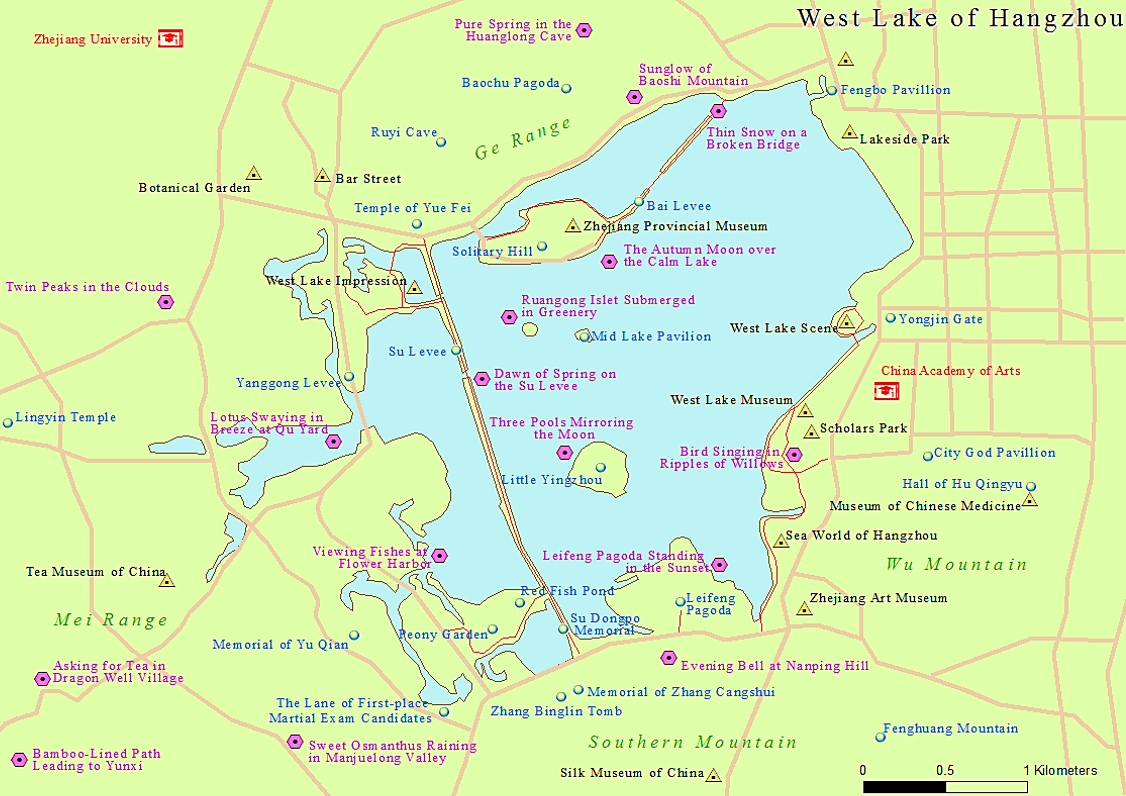
Map of the West Lake with the location of Baochu Pagoda

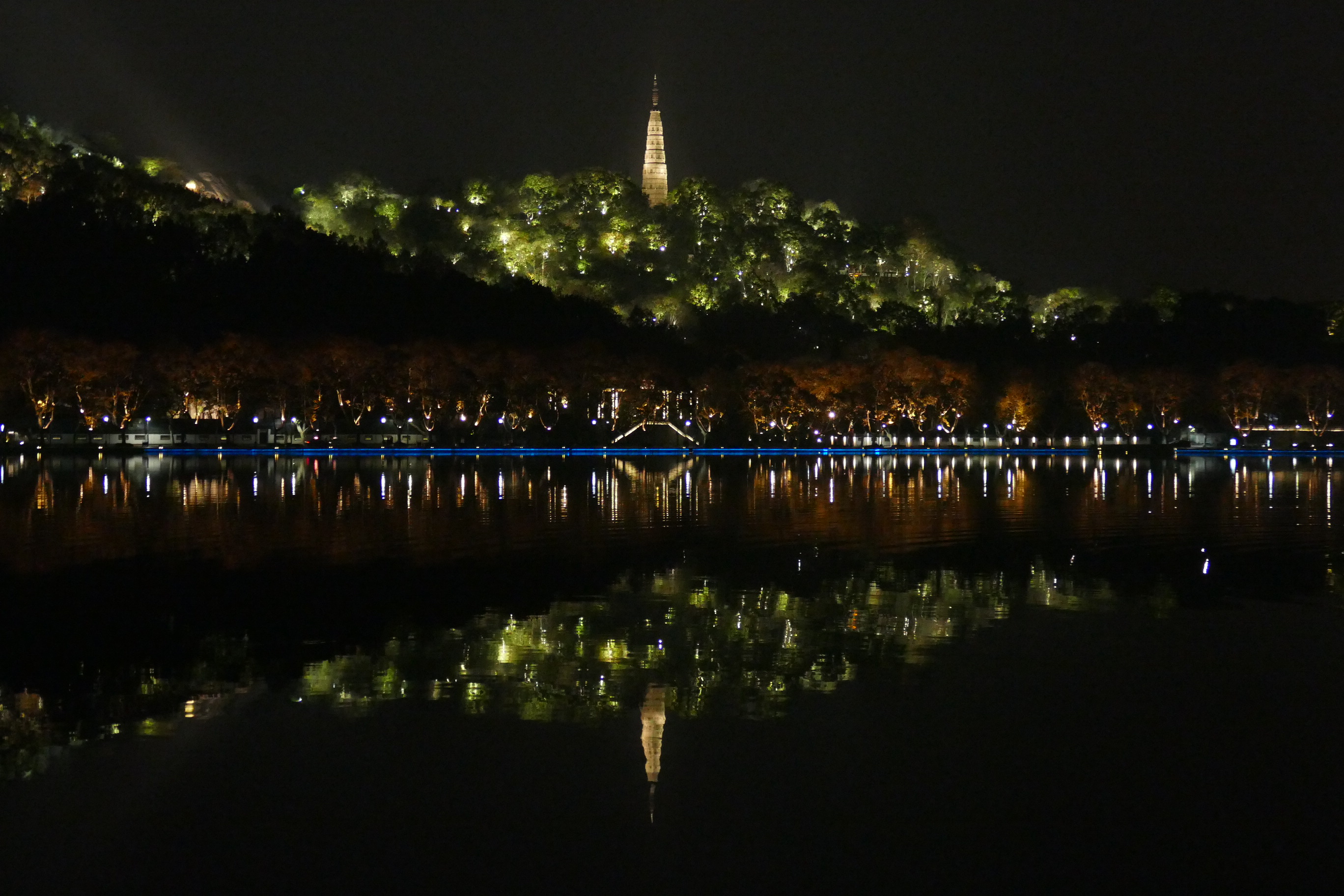
Baochu Pagoda and its reflection on Xihu (West Lake)

Baochu Pagoda (Chinese: 保俶塔; pinyin: Bǎochù tǎ) is a pagoda in Hangzhou, Zhejiang province, China. Known as one of the landmarks of the West Lake, it is located just north of the lake on top of Precious Stone Hill (宝石山, bǎoshíshān). Its small base supports seven stories (45 me) and gives it a distinctively slender and elegant appearance.

The name Baochu, translated directly, means "protect Chu", which, legend has it, refers to Qian Chu, the last king of Wuyue. As the story goes, one of Qian Chu's ministers had the temple constructed for prayers to be said for his safe return from a trip he had taken to Kaifeng, then under the rule of the Northern Song dynasty, in central China. He had been summoned there by the Emperor Taizu of Song and had been gone many days with no news of his return.

It was originally constructed in 963 and stood nine storeys tall. Its most recent reconstruction, in 1933, left it slightly shorter, seven storeys, and it has most recently had its lantern replaced on its top, though its previous one is on display near the pagoda. It is constructed of brick and stone and contains no internal staircase. The tower lies next to a path that runs the length of West Lake's northern mountain range and is accessible by both dirt paths and cement stairs from nearly every side of the mountain.

== See also ==
- Prip-Møller, Johannes; On the Building History of the Pao Shu T'a; Royal Asiatic Society of Great Britain and Ireland, North-China Branch, Vol LXVII (1936), p. 50-8 (Online Volumes of Journal)
