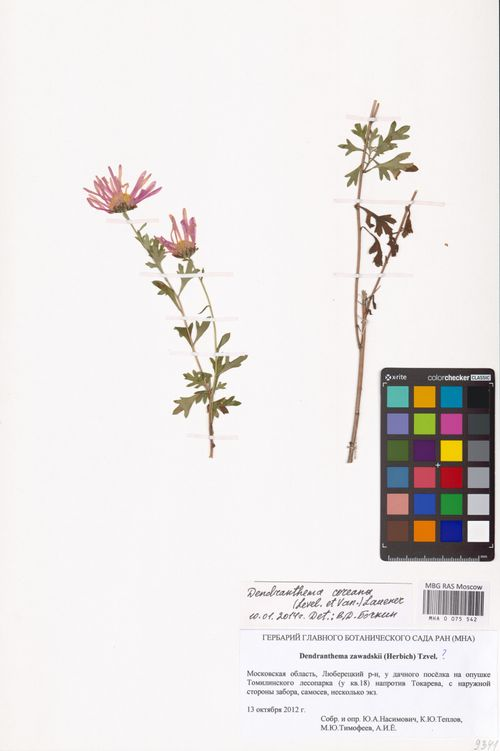

Scientific classification
- Kingdom: Plantae
- Clade: Tracheophytes
- Clade: Angiosperms
- Clade: Eudicots
- Clade: Asterids
- Order: Asterales
- Family: Asteraceae
- Genus: Chrysanthemum
- Species: C. oreastrum

Binomial name
- Chrysanthemum oreastrum Hance

Synonyms
- Dendranthema oreastrum (Hance) Y.Ling; Chrysanthemum coreanum (H.Lév. & Vaniot) Nakai; Chrysanthemum indicum var. leucanthum Nakai; Chrysanthemum sibiricum var. alpinum Nakai; Chrysanthemum sichotense (Tzvelev) Vorosch.; Chrysanthemum sinchangense Uyeki; Chrysanthemum zawadzkii var. alpinum (Nakai) Y.N.Lee; Chrysanthemum zawadzkii f. alpinum (Nakai) Kitam.; Chrysanthemum zawadzkii subsp. coreanum (H.Lév. & Vaniot) Y.N.Lee; Dendranthema coreanum (H.Lév. & Vaniot) Vorosch.; Dendranthema sichotense Tzvelev; Dendranthema sinchangense (Uyeki) Kitam.; Dendranthema zawadzkii var. alpinum (Nakai) Kitam.; Dendranthema zawadzkii var. coreanum (H.Lév. & Vaniot) M.Kim; Dendranthema zawadzkii var. sichotense (Tzvelev) M.Kim; Dendranthema zawadzkii var. sinchangense (Uyeki) M.Kim; Matricaria coreana H.Lév. & Vaniot; Tanacetum sinchangense (Uyeki) Kitam.

= Chrysanthemum oreastrum =

Species of flowering plant

Chrysanthemum oreastrum is a flowering plant within the family Asteraceae and the genus Chrysanthemum. It is a perennial flowering plant.

== Taxonomy ==
The species was first described in 1878 by Henry Fletcher Hance.

When it became understood that Linnaeus's Chrysanthemum, which was typified by a Mediterranean annual species, was distinct from the largely Asian perennial species, these latter, including Dendranthema sinchangense, were initially given names in the genus Dendranthema. In 1999, the genus name Chrysanthemum was conserved for the Asian species, so the name Chrysanthemum oreastrum became acceptable again.

== Distribution and habitat ==
Chrysanthemum oreastrum naturally occurs in east Asia and is found in far eastern Russia, Korea, and central China, in temperate zones.
