= Quercus bambusifolia =

Conservation status
- Endangered (IUCN 3.1)

Scientific classification
- Kingdom: Plantae
- Clade: Tracheophytes
- Clade: Angiosperms
- Clade: Eudicots
- Clade: Rosids
- Order: Fagales
- Family: Fagaceae
- Genus: Quercus
- Subgenus: Quercus subg. Cerris
- Section: Quercus sect. Cyclobalanopsis
- Species: Q. bambusifolia

Binomial name
- Quercus bambusifolia Hance

Synonyms
- Cyclobalanopsis neglecta Schottky; Quercus neglecta (Schottky) Koidz.

Species of oak

Quercus bambusifolia is a species of flowering plant in the family Fagaceae, native to Guangdong, Guangxi, and Hainanin southeastern China and to northern Vietnam. It was first described by Henry Fletcher Hance in 1857. It is placed in subgenus Cerris, section Cyclobalanopsis.
