= List of Natural Monuments of Japan (Ehime) =

This list is of the Natural Monuments of Japan within the Prefecture of Ehime.

== National Natural Monuments ==
As of 1 April 2021, fourteen Natural Monuments have been designated, including two *Special Natural Monuments; the *Otter has no geographical determination and the Southern Native Limit of the Long-tail iris includes areas of Yamaguchi, Saga, and Miyazaki Prefectures.

Monument	Municipality	Comments	Image	Coordinates	Type	Ref.
*Otter; Lutrinae カワウソ; Kawauso					1.2	
*Yakama Giant's Kettles 八釜の甌穴群; Yakama no ōketsu-gun	Kumakōgen			33°31′30″N 132°59′34″E	3.9	
Ōyamazumi Jinja Camphor trees Cinnamomum camphora 大山祇神社のクスノキ群; Ōyamazumi Jinja no kusunoki-gun	Imabari			34°14′52″N 133°00′21″E	2.1	
Nemalionopsis tortuosa Site of Incidence オキチモズク発生地; Okichimozuku hassei-chi	Tōon			33°47′31″N 132°53′06″E	2.8	
Oshimori-ji Fragrant olive Osmanthus fragrans var. aurantiacus 往至森寺のキンモクセイ; Oshimoriji no kinmokusei	Saijō			33°54′29″N 133°12′51″E	2.1	
Kitayoshii Chinese juniper Juniperus chinensis 北吉井のビャクシン; Kitayoshii no byakushin	Tōon			33°48′39″N 132°52′58″E	2.1	
Shimokashiwa Chinese juniper Juniperus chinensis 下柏の大柏（イブキ） Shimokashiwa no taihaku (ibuki)	Shikokuchūō			33°59′04″N 133°33′31″E	2.1	
Mount Dōzan Phyllodoce nipponica Makino Communities 銅山峰のツガザクラ群落; Dōzan-mine no tsugazakura gunraku	Niihama			33°52′06″N 133°19′48″E		
Tobe Thrust Fault 砥部衝上断層; Tobe shōjō dansō	Tobe			33°43′58″N 132°47′44″E	3.1,3,5	
Niihama Ichinomiya Jinja Camphor trees Cinnamomum camphora 新居浜一宮神社のクスノキ群; Niihama Ichinomiya Jinja no kusunoki-gun	Niihama			33°57′42″N 133°16′44″E	2.1	
Hachiman Jinja Chinese juniper Juniperus chinensis 八幡神社のイブキ; Hachiman Jinja no ibuki	Uwajima			33°14′13″N 132°34′20″E	2.1	
Misaki Sea figs Ficus superba 三崎のアコウ; Misaki no akō	Ikata			33°23′31″N 132°07′03″E	2.10	
Yawatahama Ō-shima Pseudotachylyte and Metamorphic Rock 八幡浜市大島のシュードタキライト及び変成岩類; Yawatahama-shi Ōshima no shūdotakiraito oyobi hensei-ganrui	Yawatahama			33°22′32″N 132°20′46″E	3.1,5	
Southern Native Limit of the Long-tail iris Iris rossii エヒメアヤメ自生南限地帯; Ehime-ayame jisei nangen chitai	Matsuyama	designation includes areas of Hōfu in Yamaguchi Prefecture, Saga in Saga Prefecture, and Kobayashi in Miyazaki Prefecture		33°59′N 132°47′E	2.10	

April 2021

== Prefectural Natural Monuments ==
As of 1 March 2021, seventy-seven Natural Monuments have been designated at a prefectural level.

Monument	Municipality	Comments	Image	Coordinates	Type	Ref.
Matsuyama Castle Mountain Verdure 松山城山樹叢; Matsuyama shiroyama jusō	Matsuyama			33°50′44″N 132°45′56″E		

== Municipal Natural Monuments ==
As of 1 May 2020, four hundred and eighteen Natural Monuments have been designated at a municipal level.

== See also ==
- Cultural Properties of Japan
- Parks and gardens in Ehime Prefecture
- List of Places of Scenic Beauty of Japan (Ehime)
- List of Historic Sites of Japan (Ehime)
