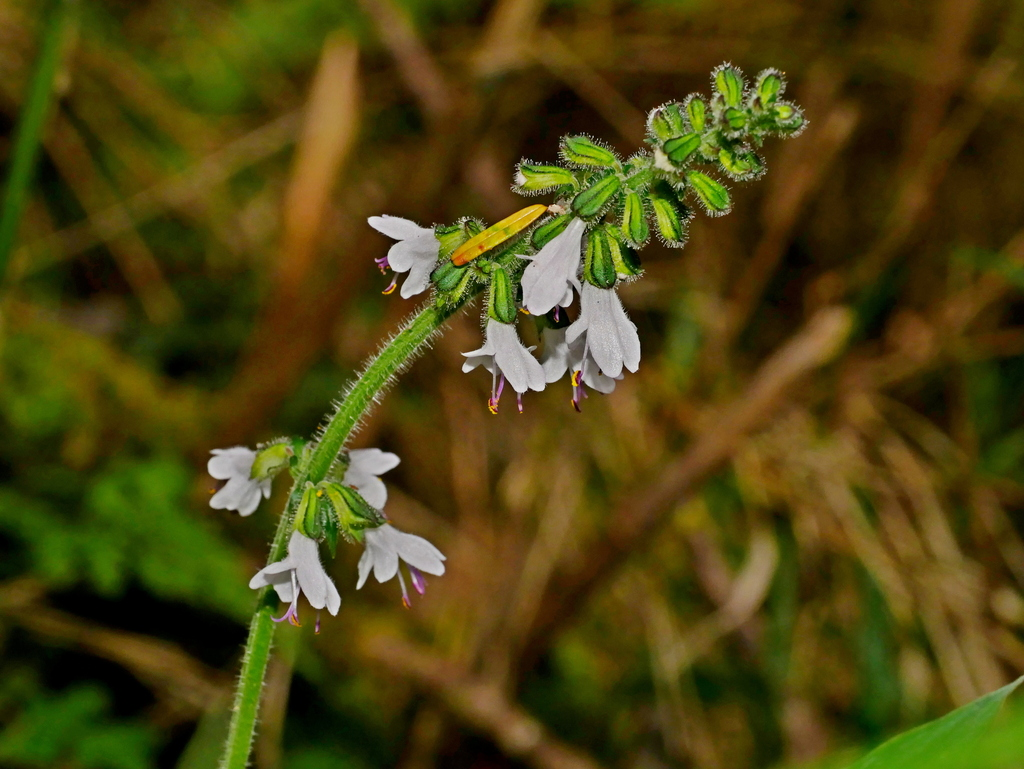

Scientific classification
- Kingdom: Plantae
- Clade: Embryophytes
- Clade: Tracheophytes
- Clade: Spermatophytes
- Clade: Angiosperms
- Clade: Eudicots
- Clade: Asterids
- Order: Lamiales
- Family: Lamiaceae
- Genus: Salvia
- Species: S. scapiformis

Binomial name
- Salvia scapiformis Hance

Varieties
- S. scapiformis var. scapiformis; S. scapiformis var. carphocalyx E. Peter; S. scapiformis var. hirsuta E. Peter

= Salvia scapiformis =

Species of herb

Salvia scapiformis is an herb that is native to several provinces in China, along with Taiwan and the Philippines, growing at 100 to 1,200 m (330 to 3,940 ft) elevation. S. scapiformis grows on slender stems to 20 to 26 cm (7.9 to 10.2 in) tall, with mostly simple leaves that are basal or subbasal, rarely growing on the stem. Inflorescences are widely spaced 6–10-flowered verticillasters in terminal racemes or panicles that are 10 to 20 cm (3.9 to 7.9 in) long. The corolla is purple or white, approximately 7 mm (0.28 in).

There are three named varieties, with slight variations in leaves, verticillasters, and calyx:

- S. scapiformis var. scapiformis
- S. carphocalyx var. pteridifolia
- S. nanchuanensis var. hirsuta
