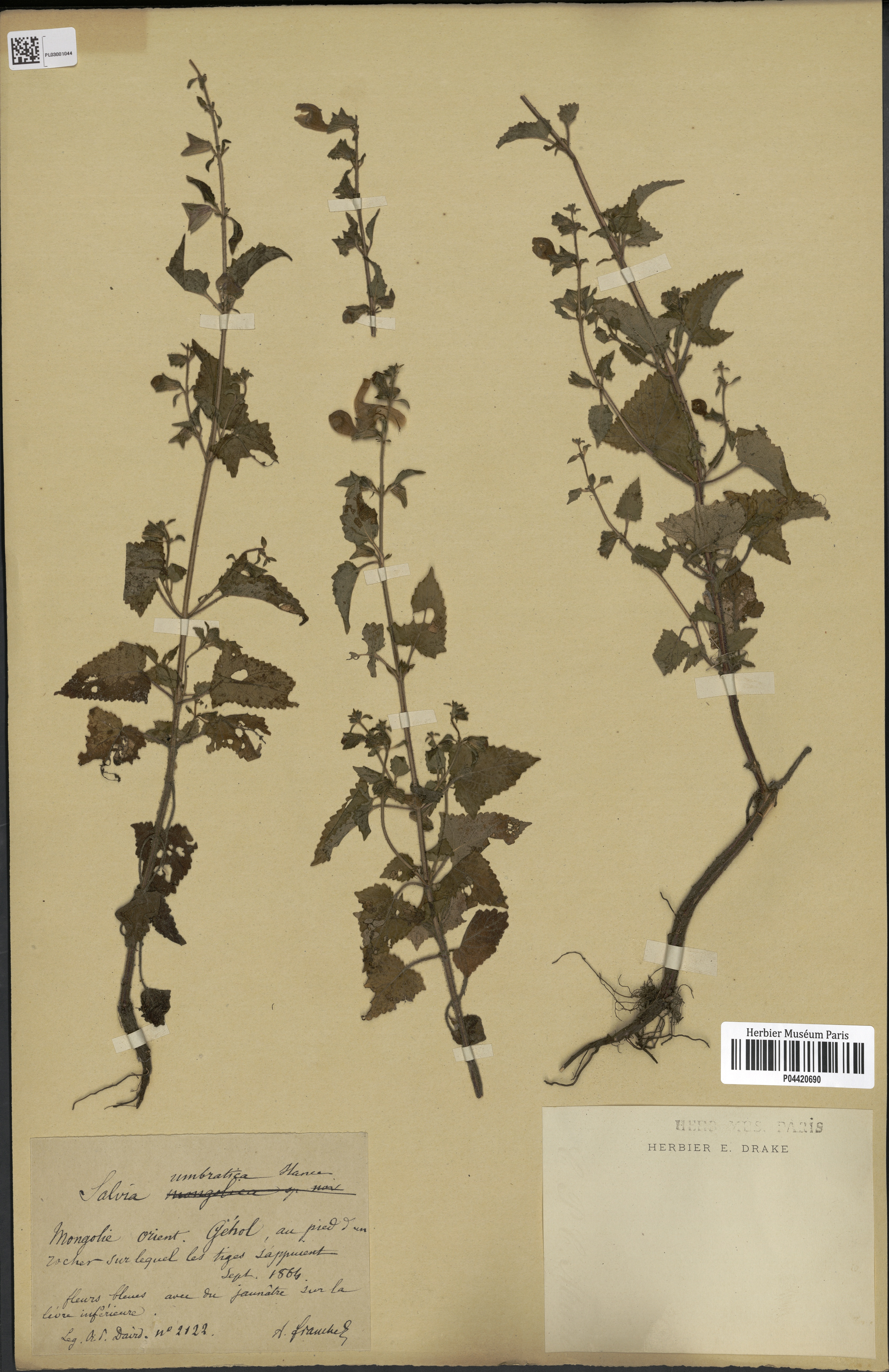

Scientific classification
- Kingdom: Plantae
- Clade: Tracheophytes
- Clade: Angiosperms
- Clade: Eudicots
- Clade: Asterids
- Order: Lamiales
- Family: Lamiaceae
- Genus: Salvia
- Species: S. umbratica

Binomial name
- Salvia umbratica Hance

= Salvia umbratica =

Species of flowering plant

Salvia umbratica (the shaded sage) is an annual or biennial plant that is native to Anhui, Gansu, Hebei, Hubei, Shaanxi, and Shanxi provinces in China, found growing on hillsides and valleys at 600 to 2,000 m (2,000 to 6,600 ft) elevation. S. umbratica grows on erect stems to 1.2 m (3.9 ft) tall, with triangular to ovate-triangular leaves that are 3 to 16 cm (1.2 to 6.3 in) long and 2.3 to 16 cm (0.91 to 6.30 in) wide.

Inflorescences are widely spaced 2-flowered verticillasters in terminal and axillary racemes, with a 2.3 to 2.8 cm (0.91 to 1.10 in) blue-purple or purple corolla.
