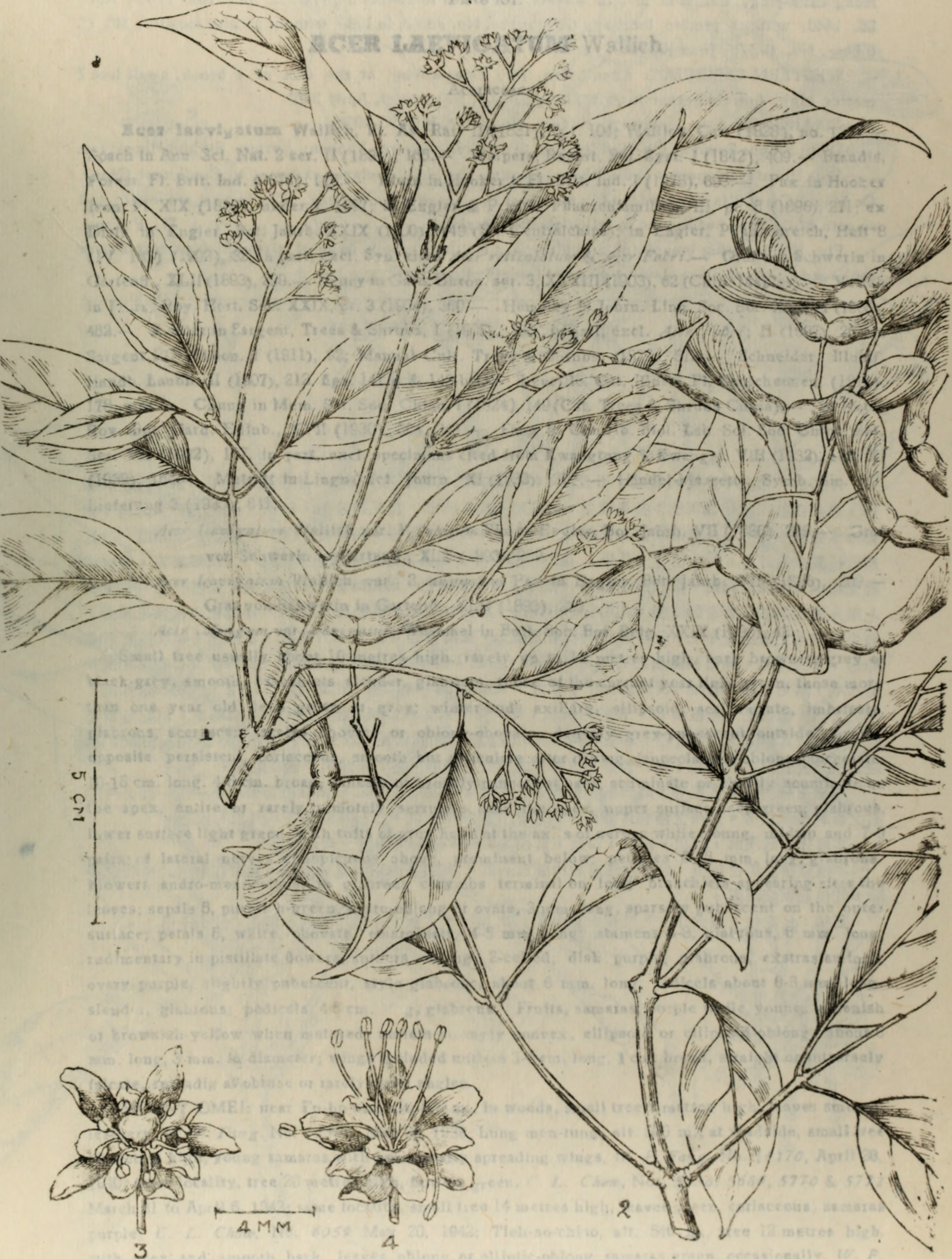
- Botanical illustration

Scientific classification
- Kingdom: Plantae
- Clade: Tracheophytes
- Clade: Angiosperms
- Clade: Eudicots
- Clade: Rosids
- Order: Sapindales
- Family: Sapindaceae
- Genus: Acer
- Section: Acer sect. Palmata
- Series: Acer ser. Penninervia
- Species: A. fabri

Binomial name
- Acer fabri Hance 1884

Synonyms
- Acer fargesii (H.J.Veitch) Rehder; Acer prainii H.Lév.; Acer reticulatum Champ. ex Benth.

= Acer fabri =

Species of plant

Acer fabri, or Faber's maple, is a species of evergreen maple shrub native to Vietnam and central to southern China (Guangdong, Guangxi, Guizhou, Hainan, Hubei, Hunan, Jiangxi, Sichuan, Yunnan).

Acer fabri is a shrub rarely more than 1 meter tall. It has with unlobed, lance-shaped leaves, unlike the multilobed leaves found on most maple species. Newly grown leaves and samaras take on a reddish hue. It was collected by the Rev. Ernst Faber and described by Henry Fletcher Hance.
