= List of Natural Monuments of Japan (Saga) =

This list is of the Natural Monuments of Japan within the Prefecture of Saga.

== National Natural Monuments ==
As of 1 April 2021, fifteen Natural Monuments have been designated; Magpie Habitat spans the prefectural borders with Fukuoka Prefecture and the Southern Native Limit of the Long-tail iris includes areas of Yamaguchi, Ehime, and Miyazaki Prefectures.

Monument	Municipality	Comments	Image	Coordinates	Type	Ref.
Japanese dormouse Glirulus japonicus ヤマネ; Yamane		found in Honshū, Shikoku, and Kyūshū			1.1	
Japanese wood pigeon Columba janthina カラスバト; Karasubato					1.2	
Arita Ginkgo; Ginkgo biloba 有田のイチョウ; Arita no ichō	Arita			33°11′38″N 129°54′20″E	2.1	
Imari Bay Japanese horseshoe crab Breeding Grounds; Tachypleus tridentatus 伊万里湾カブトガニ繁殖地; Imari-wan kabutogani hanshoku-chi	Imari			33°18′03″N 129°50′37″E		
Ureshino Giant Tea plant Camellia sinensis 嬉野の大チャノキ; Ureshino no ōchanoki	Ureshino			33°05′56″N 129°56′01″E	2.1	
Kawako Camphor tree Cinnamomum camphora 川古のクス; Kawako no kusu	Takeo			33°15′07″N 129°59′37″E	2.1	
Mount Kurokami Gleichenia laevissima Native Area 黒髪山カネコシダ自生地; Kurokami-yama kaneko-shida jisei-chi	Takeo			33°12′45″N 129°54′08″E	2.12	
Kōtaku-ji Japanese sago palm Cycas revoluta 広沢寺のソテツ; Kōtakuji no sotetsu	Karatsu			33°31′51″N 129°52′16″E	2.1	
Shimoōse Giant Katsura; Cercidiphyllum japonicum 下合瀬の大カツラ; Shimoōse no ōkatsura	Saga			33°26′37″N 130°15′37″E	2.1	
Mount Sengoku Northern Native Limit of the Sasanqua camellia Camellia sasanqua 千石山サザンカ自生北限地帯; Sengoku-yama sazanka jisei hokugen chitai	Yoshinogari			33°22′56″N 130°23′38″E	2.2,10	
Takakushi Northern Native Limit of the Sea fig Ficus superba 高串アコウ自生北限地帯; Takakushi akō jisei hokugen chitai	Karatsu			33°25′17″N 129°49′42″E	2.10	
Yakataishi no Nanatsugama 屋形石の七ツ釜; Yakataishi no nanatsugama	Karatsu			33°32′57″N 129°55′56″E	3.9	
Yatō Hills Aso Four Pyroclastic Flows Sediment and Buried Forest 八藤丘陵の阿蘇4火砕流堆積物及び埋没林; Yatō kyōri no Aso yon kasai ryūtai sekibutsu oyobi maibotsu-rin	Kamimine			33°20′55″N 130°25′31″E	3.1,10	
Magpie Habitat; Pica pica カササギ生息地; Kasasagi seisoku-chi	Kashima, Ogi, Saga, Takeo, Taku, Tosu, Ureshino, Fujitsu District, Kanzaki District, Kishima District, and Miyaki District	designation includes areas of Kurume, Miyama, Yanagawa, and Mizuma District in Fukuoka Prefecture			1.5	
Southern Native Limit of the Long-tail iris Iris rossii エヒメアヤメ自生南限地帯; Ehime-ayame jisei nangen chitai	Saga	designation includes areas of Hōfu in Yamaguchi Prefecture, Matsuyama in Ehime Prefecture, and Kobayashi in Miyazaki Prefecture		35°31′36″N 134°07′13″E	2.10	

April 2021

== Prefectural Natural Monuments ==
As of 1 May 2020, sixteen Natural Monuments have been designated at a prefectural level.

== Municipal Natural Monuments ==
As of 1 May 2020, fifty-nine Natural Monuments have been designated at a municipal level.

== See also ==
- Cultural Properties of Japan
- Parks and gardens in Saga Prefecture
- List of Places of Scenic Beauty of Japan (Saga)
- List of Historic Sites of Japan (Saga)
