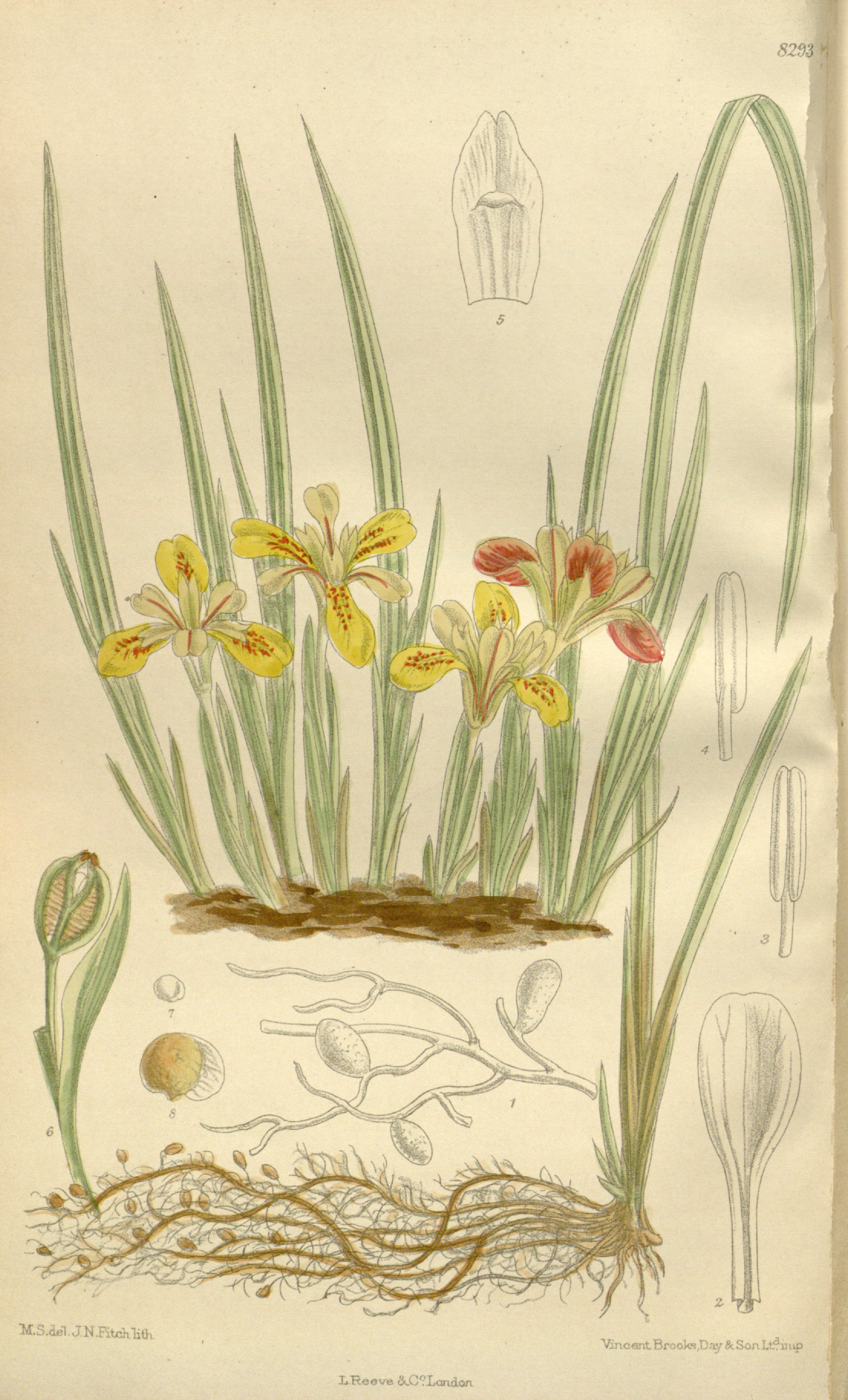
- Iris minutoaurea from Curtis's Botanical Magazine, London

Scientific classification
- Kingdom: Plantae
- Clade: Tracheophytes
- Clade: Angiosperms
- Clade: Monocots
- Order: Asparagales
- Family: Iridaceae
- Genus: Iris
- Subgenus: Iris subg. Limniris
- Section: Iris sect. Limniris
- Series: Iris ser. Chinenses

= Iris ser. Chinenses =

Group of flowering plants

Iris ser. Chinenses is a series of the genus Iris, in Iris subg. Limniris.

The series was first classified by Diels in 'Die Natürlichen Pflanzenfamilien' (Edited by H. G. A. Engler and K. Prantl) in 1930. It was further expanded by Lawrence in Gentes Herb (written in Dutch) in 1953.

Most species come from East Asia with flattish (looking) flowers. The species in this series are similar in form to small forms of Iris ser. Sibiricae. Species in the series generally have a ridge on the falls of the flowers, similar to a crest.

They are not hardy in the UK and should be cultivated in an alpine house, with plenty of water during the growing months. Only 'Iris minutoaurea' has been cultivated in Britain.

The series has been analysed by C. A Wilson in 2009, and found to be polyphyletic.

Includes;

Image	Scientific name	Distribution
	Iris henryi Baker	China ( Anhui, Gansu, Hubei, Hunan and Sichuan)
	Iris koreana Nakai	Korea
	Iris minutoaurea Makino	Korea and China (Liaoning)
	Iris odaesanensis Y.N.Lee	China (Jilin) and eastern Korea
	Iris proantha Diels	China (Anhui, Henan, Hubei, Hunan, Jiangsu and Zhejiang)
	Iris rossii Baker	Japan, Korea and China
	Iris speculatrix Hance	China (Anhui, Fujian, Guangdong, Guangxi, Guizhou, Henan, Hubei, Hunan, Jiangsu, Jiangxi, Qinghai, Shaanxi, Shanxi, Sichuan, Xizang, Yunnan and Zhejiang), Taiwan
