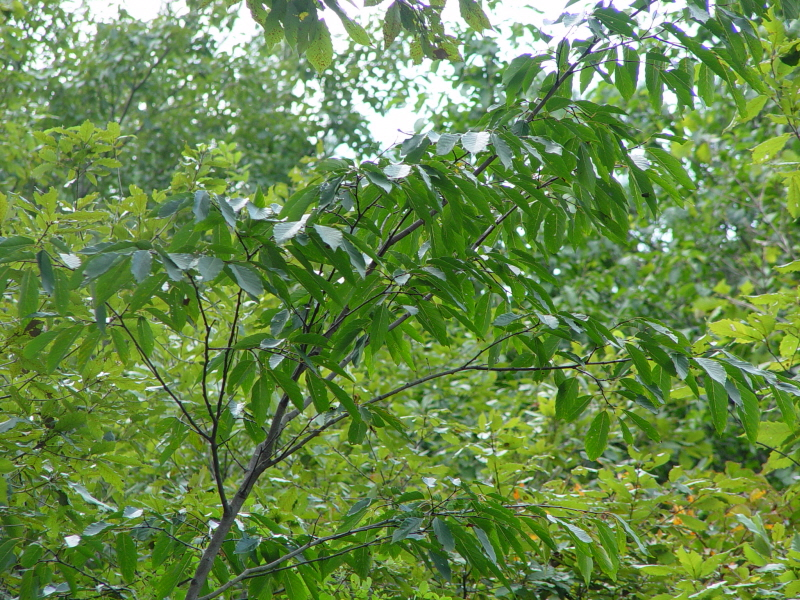

Scientific classification
- Kingdom: Plantae
- Clade: Tracheophytes
- Clade: Angiosperms
- Clade: Eudicots
- Clade: Rosids
- Order: Rosales
- Family: Rhamnaceae
- Genus: Berchemia
- Species: B. berchemiifolia

Binomial name
- Berchemia berchemiifolia (Makino) Koidz.

= Berchemia berchemiifolia =

Species of plant

Berchemia berchemiifolia (Korean: 망개나무, 멧대싸리, or 살배나무) is a rare deciduous tree found in Korea, Japan, and nearby regions. Its leaves alternate, and has a narrow elliptical shape and a pointy tip. It has wavy edges and is pale whitish on the underside. "망개나무" may also refer to unrelated Smilax china.

The flowers are bisexual, borne in racemes, and small blossoms appear from the leaf axils in June to July. The pedicels are short, the style is single, and the stigma splits into two parts.

The fruit is a drupe and elongated in form, and ripens to a reddish color in August.

== Designated Natural Monument of Korea ==
Some Berchemia berchemiifolia are listed as a Natural Monument of South Korea:

- Korean Berchemia of Songnisan Mountain, Boeun — No. 207
- Natural Habitat of Korean Berchemias in Sadam-ri, Goesan — No. 266
- Korean Berchemia of Songgye-ri, Jewon — No. 337
