= Gyebangsan (Gangwon) =

Mountain in South Korea

Coordinates: 37°43′42″N 128°27′56″E

Highest point
- Elevation: 1,577 m (5,174 ft)

Geography
- Location: South Korea

Korean name
- Hangul: 계방산
- Hanja: 桂芳山
- RR: Gyebangsan
- MR: Kyebangsan

Gyebangsan (Korean: 계방산) is a mountain between the counties of Hongcheon and Pyeongchang, Gangwon Province, South Korea. It has an elevation of 1,577 m (5,174 ft).

The vascular plants of the mountain have been listed according to the 'Red List' of the IUCN. They include Iris minutoaurea Makino.

== See also ==
- List of mountains in Korea
