= Hangzhou Botanical Garden =

Botanical garden in Hangzhou, China

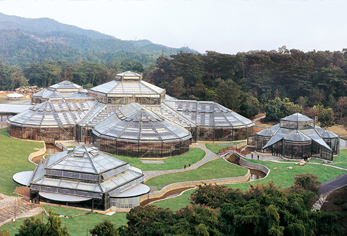
Greenhouses shown in 2006.

Hangzhou Botanical Garden (simplified Chinese: 杭州植物园; traditional Chinese: 杭州植物園) is a large public botanical garden located in Hangzhou City, Zhejiang Province, People's Republic of China.

== Introduction ==
The garden was founded in 1956. It is located in Taoyuanling, Xihu District, Hangzhou. It has an area of 248.46 acres (1.0055 km^{2}). The soil belongs to the red soil and yellow soil, with pH value ranging from 4.9 to 6.5. It is affiliated to Hangzhou Gardens and Relics Management Bureau. It's also a main botanical study and research base for Zhejiang University.
