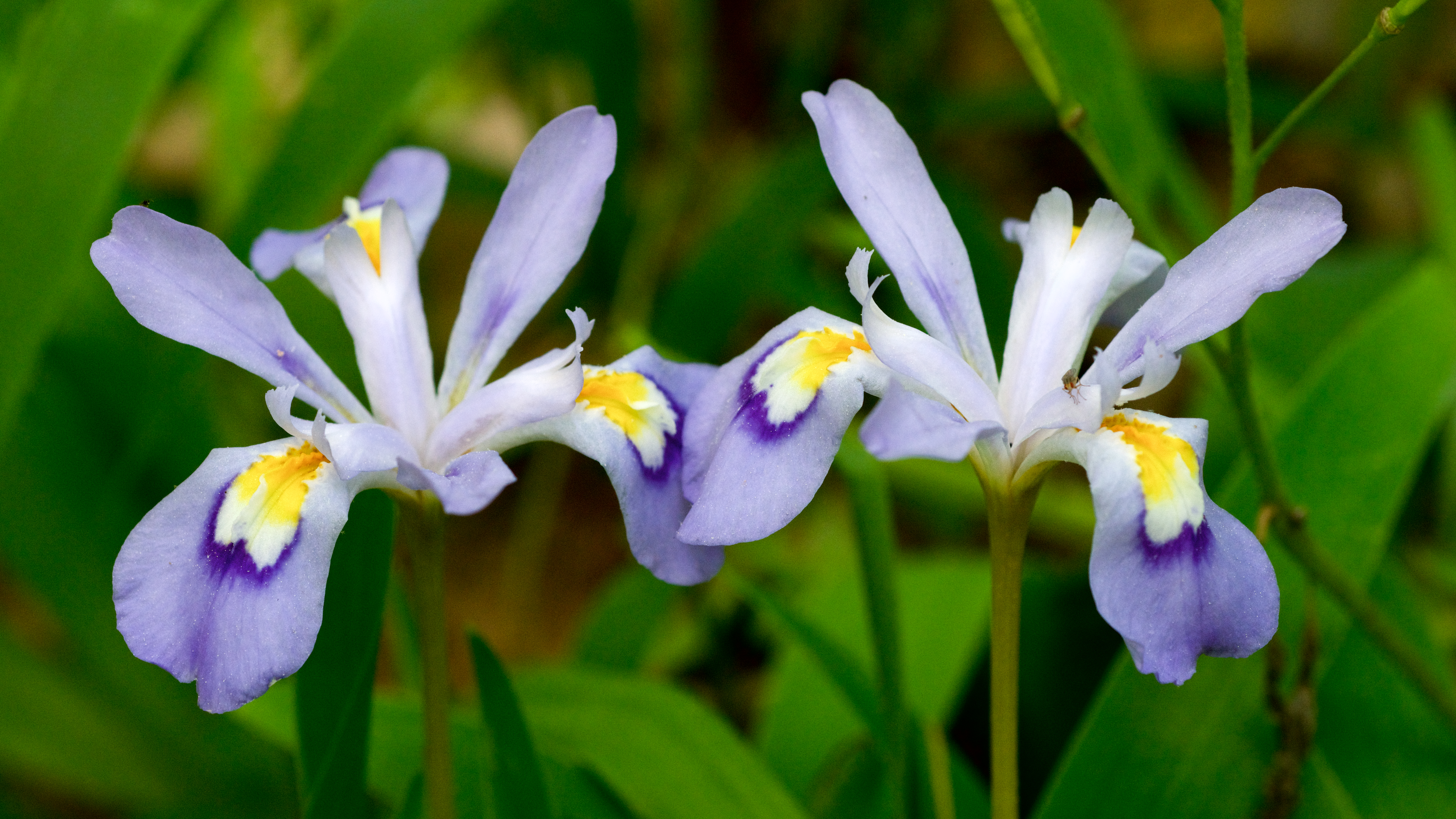
- Ozark National Forest, Pope County, Arkansas

Conservation status
- Secure (NatureServe)

Scientific classification
- Kingdom: Plantae
- Clade: Tracheophytes
- Clade: Angiosperms
- Clade: Monocots
- Order: Asparagales
- Family: Iridaceae
- Genus: Iris
- Subgenus: Iris subg. Limniris
- Section: Iris sect. Lophiris
- Species: I. cristata

Binomial name
- Iris cristata Ait.

Synonyms
- Evansia cristata (Aiton) Klatt; Iris cristata var. alba Dykes; Iris glumacea Raf.; Iris glumacea var. angustifolia Raf.; Iris odorata Pers.; Neubeckia cristata (Aiton) Alef.

= Iris cristata =

Dwarf crested iris

Species of flowering plant

Iris cristata (also known as dwarf crested iris and crested iris) is a species in the genus Iris, and is part of the subgenus of Limniris. It is a rhizomatous perennial plant, endemic to the eastern United States. It has pale lavender flowers with a white patch and orange or yellow crest. It is a close relative to Iris lacustris (Dwarf lake iris), the only other crested iris native to North America. It is cultivated as an ornamental plant in temperate regions.

== Description ==
It has slender, greenish or whitish yellow rhizomes. They are shallow rooted. They spread by sending out long stolons from multiple branches. They can have up to 2–8 cord-like branches. The branches can be 20–30 cm (8–12 in) long and 1–2 mm wide. Under the rhizomes are fleshy-like roots. The branches are brown. The creeping habit can create large masses of plants over time.

It has 6–8 basal leaves, which are divided onto 2–3 proximal (close to centre) leaves and 4–5 distal (away from centre) leaves. The proximal leaves are falcate (sickle-shaped), light brown with a darker brown central mid-rib, and the distal leaves are ensiform (sword-like), green or yellowish green, with a few visible veins. They can grow up to between 7.5 and 15 cm (3 and 6 in) long and 1–2.5 cm wide. They elongate after flowering, growing up to 15–40 cm (6–16 in) long. The elongated leaves hide any seed pods produced later.

It has short stems, (almost stemless), growing up to between 2.5 and 4.5 cm (1 and 2 in) tall. The pedicel or stem, is the same length to the ovary.

It has an overall height with stem and flower reaching 7–10 cm (3–4 in) tall.

It has 2–3 cauline (on the stem), spathes (leaves of the flower bud), which are green, falcate (sickle-shaped) slightly inflated, unequal (outer leaves are shorter than the inner leaves) and 2–6 cm (1–2 in) long.

The spathes bear 1 or 2 flowers, in Spring, or early Summer, between April and May. They only flower for a short time.

The fragrant flowers are 3–5 cm (1–2 in) in diameter, and come in shades of blue, from lavender, to lilac, to pale blue, and purple. There are occasionally white forms, and very rarely pink forms.

It has 2 pairs of petals, 3 large sepals (outer petals), known as the 'falls' and 3 inner, smaller petals (or tepals, known as the 'standards'. The spreading falls are 3–6 cm (1–2 in) long and 1.5–2.5 cm wide. They have a central white signal patch, which is surrounded by a purple (or dark blue,) ring, with 3 parallel orange or yellow crests (or ridges). The fall tapers towards the claw (close to the stem). The standards are erect, oblanceolate and 3–4 cm (1–2 in) long and 1–2 cm wide (narrower and shorter than the falls).

It has a filiform (thread-like), perianth tube that is 4–8 cm (2–3 in) long. This large flower tube lifts the flower above ground level.

It has a triangular, 0.6–1 cm long ovary, an oblong stigma (half the size of the falls,) and 1.5 cm long, triangular crested, style branch.

After the iris has flowered, it produces an ovoid seed capsule. The capsule is 1–2 cm long, with ridged angles and triangular in cross-section. Inside the capsule, are ellipsoid, yellowish-brown seeds that are 3.2–3.5 mm across and have a white appendage that spirally wraps around the seed.

=== Biochemistry ===
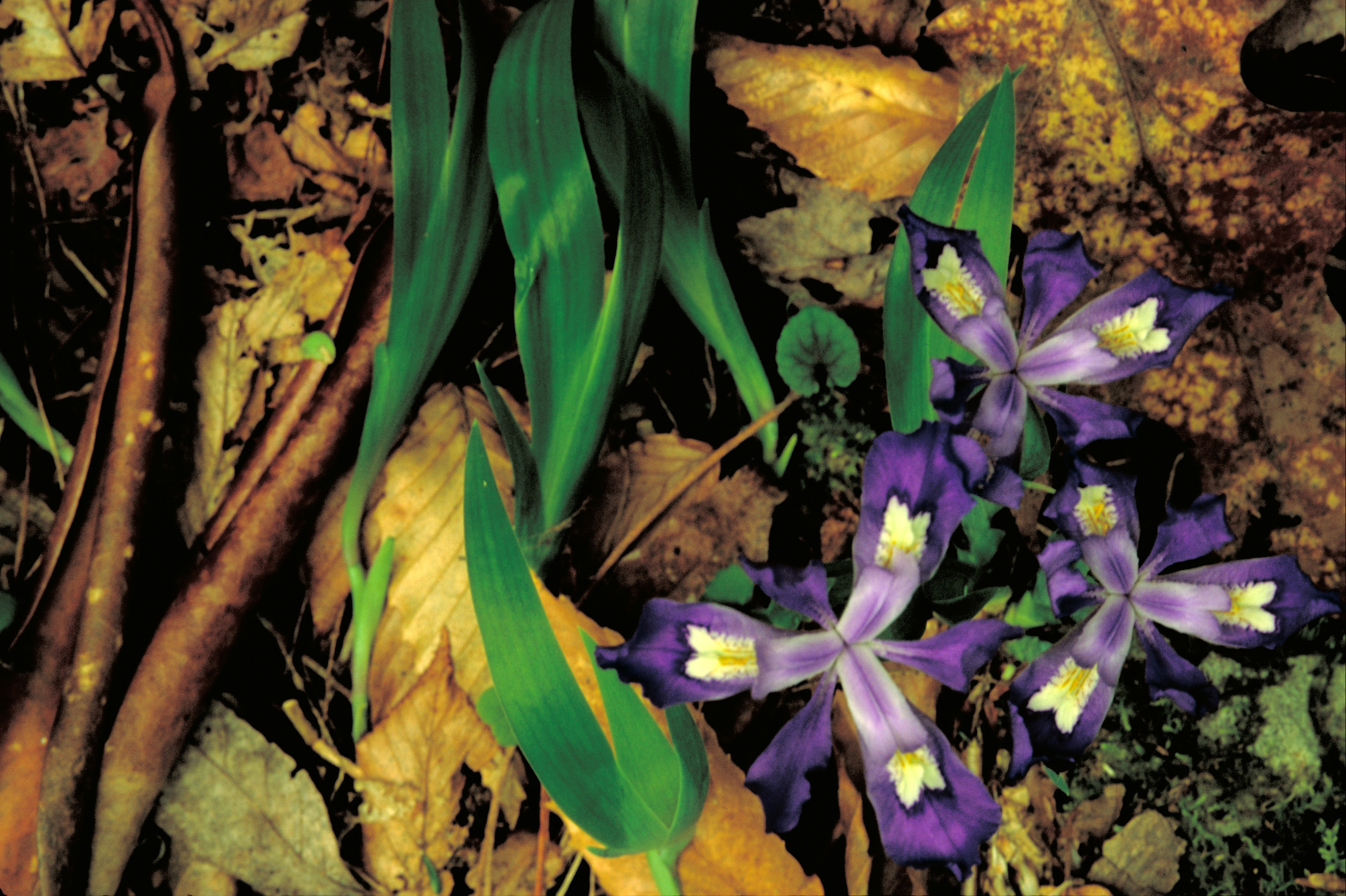

In 2000, a study was carried out on the genetic diversity of Iris cristata and Iris lacustris. It was found that Iris cristata, is a widespread species of unglaciated regions of eastern North America, it would have a wide genetic diversity similar to other known widespread plant species, compared to the threatened Iris lacustris, which only occupies glaciated habitats on Great Lakes shorelines, (therefore smaller range) would display little genetic variation.

In 2013, a study was carried out on chromosomal characters of various iris species.

As most irises are diploid, having two sets of chromosomes, this can be used to identify hybrids and classification of groupings. It has been counted twice, 2n=24 (Longley, 1928) and 32 (Simonet, 1934). It is normally published as 2n=32.

== Taxonomy ==
It is pronounced as (Iris) EYE-ris (cristata) kris-TAH-tah.

It has common names of dwarf crested iris, or crested iris, and lady's calamus.

It is known as krypiris in Swedish.

The Latin specific epithet cristata is derived from 'crista', meaning crested or with tassel-like tips. This refers to the golden yellow crest on the sepal of the iris.

In the 1750s, the American Quaker botanist John Bartram (1699–1777) introduced Iris crisatata to England via his correspondence friend, Peter Collinson. He had sent several specimen plants across the Atlantic to him. It has been in European culture in since 1766.

It was first published and described by William Aiton in Hortus Kewensis (Hort. Kew.) Volume 1, page 70 in 1789.

It was later published in Botanical Magazine (t 412) in 1798, then in 'Addisonia' Volume 9, Issue 4 on page 63 in December 1924 with a coloured illustration, as well as in the Journal of the RHS Volume 88 in 1963.

It was verified by United States Department of Agriculture and the Agricultural Research Service on 11 April 2000, then updated on 1 December 2004.

Iris cristata is an accepted name by the RHS.

== Distribution and habitat ==
It is native to temperate regions of United States of America.

=== Range ===
It is found in northeastern U.S., within the states of Indiana, Ohio, Pennsylvania, and West Virginia.

It is also found in north-central U.S., within the states of Illinois, Iowa, Missouri, and Oklahoma.

In southeastern U.S., it is found within the states of Alabama, Arkansas, District of Columbia, and Georgia.

It is found within the Ouachita Mountains, Allegheny Mountains, Appalachian and Ozark Mountains.

The range is south of where the Wisconsinan glaciation spread about 11,000 years ago.

=== Habitat ===
It grows in calcareous soils, in oak woodlands (or forests), on rocky hillsides, in ravines, on mountain ledges (and bluffs), and along streams.

== Conservation ==
Iris cristata is listed as 'endangered' in Maryland and Pennsylvania.

== Cultivation ==
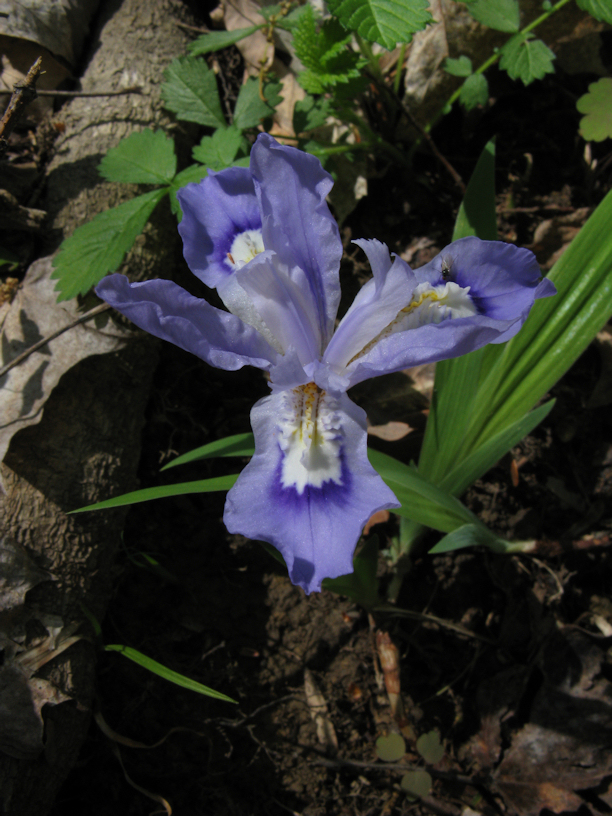
Close-up of the flower of Iris cristata

It is hardy to between USDA Zone 3 and Zone 9, and is hardy to European Zone H2, meaning it is hardy down to −20 °C.

It prefers to grow in well-drained soils that are neutral or slightly acidic (pH level of 6.1 to 6.5). It also prefers medium to high fertile soils containing humus, although it will tolerate loamy soils.

It can tolerate shade or full sun, but prefers cool, semi-shaded positions.

It has average to above average water needs during the growing season.

It becomes dormant in winter.

It can be grown in a mixed flower border, or rock garden. It also can be naturalized, within a woodland garden, creating ground-cover. It can also be grown on peat banks, with other acidic loving plants, including camellias and azaleas.

It is normally recommended to add peat (or leaf-mould) and sharp sand (or grit) when planting new plants. The roots are planted (during spring, summer or autumn) so that the top of the rhizome is about 3–5 cm below the soil line.

Once planted, they can be surrounded with leaf mulch to help with moisture retention.

They can suffer from damage by snails and slugs.

They also can suffer damage from deer, but the plants can survive the nibbling, and flowers can also be eaten.

Other minor threats include iris borer, verbena bud moth, whiteflies, iris weevil, thrips, aphids, nematodes, bacterial leaf blight and soft rot, crown rot, rhizome rot, leaf spot, rust, viruses, and scorch.

Grown in ideal conditions, the plants can live for up to 10 years.

Smaller, poorer and paler forms were originally mistakenly thought to be Iris lacustris.

They can be found in plenty of reputable nurseries in the US, but it is rarely offered on sale in Europe.

=== Propagation ===
It can be propagated by division or by seed growing.

Since the plant needs to be frequently divided every 3 to 4 years, to keep the plant healthy and vigorous, it is easier and more reliable to propagate via division.

This is best done in the early fall (or autumn), when the leaves have turned yellow. The rhizome should be split into hand-sized clumps to allow for plenty of new growth to occur. The new plants should be kept moist until established, they also can be mulched (with a maximum of 4 inches deep) to help with water retention.

If propagating by seed, seeds are collected from the ripe brown capsules after flowering and sown on acid or slightly acidic soil. The plant can take up to 3 years to mature from a seedling into a flowering plant.

=== Hybrids and cultivars ===
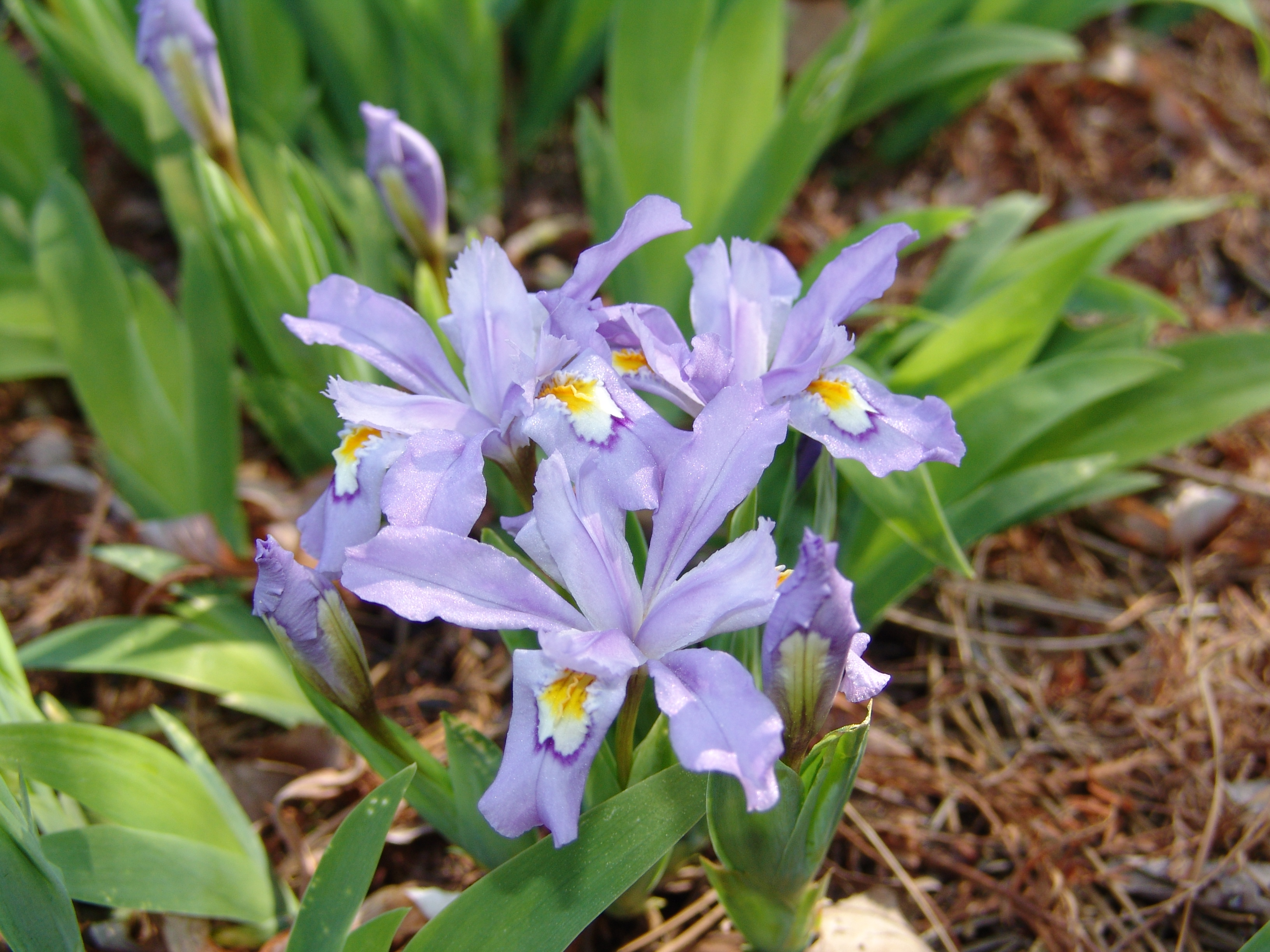
cultivar of Iris cristata in Norfolk Botanical Garden, 'Eco Bluebird'

Iris cristata has many different cultivars.

Including; Iris cristata 'Alba' (a white flowering form), 'Abbey's Violet', 'Azure', 'Baby Blue', 'Caerulea' (deep blue blooms), 'Celestial Gem', 'Crested Fairy', 'Crested Gem', 'Crested Ivory', 'Crest Of Hope', 'Cristata Alba', 'Cristata Major', 'McDonald', 'Cumberland Gap', 'Dash It All', 'Dick Butler', ‘Echo Ruffles’ (large purple blooms), 'Eco Little Bluebird', 'Eco Orchid Giant', 'Eco Purple Pomp', 'Eco Royal Ruffles', 'Eco White Angel', 'Edgar Anderson', 'Eyed Form', 'Gold Crest', 'Little Jay', 'Major', 'Millard', 'Navy Blue Gem', 'Pearl White', 'Pink', 'Powder Blue Giant', 'Shenandoah Sky',(pale blue blooms) 'Scio County', 'Skylands', 'Stormy Sky', 'Summer Sky' (deep blue blooms), 'Summer Storm', 'Tennessee White',(a white form)'Vein Mountain', 'Whisper' and 'White Pearl'.

== Toxicity ==
Like many other irises, most parts of the plant are poisonous (rhizome and leaves), and if mistakenly ingested can cause stomach pains and vomiting. Handling the plant may cause a skin irritation or an allergic reaction, and there is also a risk of dermatitis.

== Uses ==
It has been listed as a medicinal plant.

It has been used by the Cherokee North American Indians in herbal medicines. A decoction of the pulverized root was used as salve for ulcers. An infusion (tea) taken for liver. Also a decoction of the root was used to treat a "yellowish urine." The root was also used as an ingredient in a cream applied to skin ulcers.

The root has also been used as a spice.

In the 19th century, hunters in Virginia used the root, as a thirst aid. It is initially sweet and then the taste of the root becomes pungently acrid.

In its native region, it has been marked as a commercially available pollinator plant that attracts bees.

== Other sources ==
- Aldén, B., S. Ryman & M. Hjertson. 2009. Våra kulturväxters namn – ursprung och användning. Formas, Stockholm (Handbook on Swedish cultivated and utility plants, their names and origin).
- Browne, E. T. & R. Athey. 1992. Vascular plants of Kentucky: an annotated checklist.
- Deam, C. C. 1940. Flora of Indiana.
- Duncan, W. H. & J. T. Kartesz. 1981. Vascular flora of Georgia: an annotated checklist.
- FNA Editorial Committee. 1993–. Flora of North America. [lists as I. cristata Sol. ex Aiton].
- Gleason, H. A. & A. Cronquist. 1991. Manual of vascular plants of northeastern United States and adjacent Canada, ed. 2.
- Jones, G. N. & G. D. Fuller. 1955. Vascular plants of Illinois.
- Mathew, B. 1981. The Iris. 71.
- Mohlenbrock, R. H. & D. M. Ladd. 1978. Distribution of Illinois vascular plants.
- Ohio Flora Committee (E. L. Braun, T. S. Cooperrider, T. R. Fisher, J. J. Furlow). 1967–. The vascular flora of Ohio.
- Radford, A. E. et al. 1964. Manual of the vascular flora of the Carolinas.
- Rickett. 1967. Wild flowers of the United States 2 (Plate 22)
- Rhoads, A. F. & T. A. Block. 2000. The plants of Pennsylvania. An illustrated manual.
- Strausbaugh, T. D. & E. L. Core. 1978. Flora of West Virginia, ed. 2.
- Wherry, E. T. et al. 1979. Atlas of the flora of Pennsylvania.
- Yatskievych, G. 1999–. Steyermark's Flora of Missouri, revised edition.
