= Henry Fletcher Hance =

British diplomat

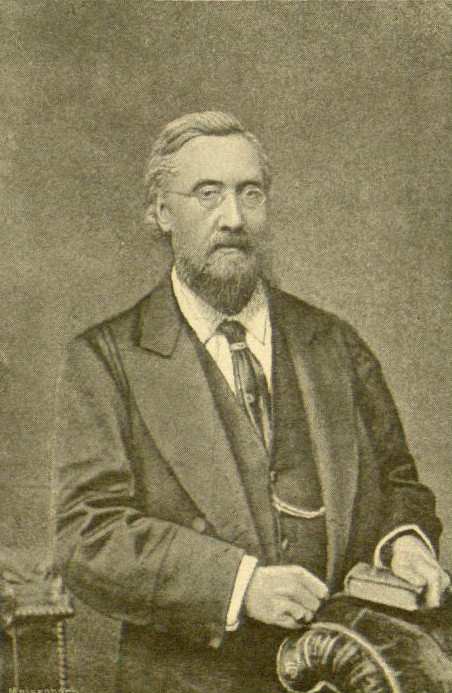
Henry Fletcher Hance

Henry Fletcher Hance (4 August 1827 – 22 June 1886) was a British diplomat who devoted his spare time to the study of Chinese plants.

Born in Brompton, London, his first appointment was to Hong Kong in 1844. In May 1852 in Exeter he married his first wife Anne Edith Baylis, who accompanied him on his return to Hong Kong. He later became vice-consul (1861–1878) to Whampoa, consul (1878–1881) to Canton, and finally consul to Xiamen, where he died in 1886. In 1873, Hance published a supplement to George Bentham's 1861 Flora Hongkongensis.

He graduated as Philosophiae Doctor from the University of Giessen on 24 November 1849, during which time he was in China.

He found, named and described (in Latin) Iris speculatrix in 1875. He was the taxonomic author of many plants. In 1857 Berthold Carl Seemann named the genus Hancea (family Euphorbiaceae) in his honour. In 1878 Hance was elected a fellow of the Linnean Society of London. Specimens collected by Bastow are cared for in multiple herbaria, including at the National Herbarium of Victoria (MEL), Royal Botanic Gardens Victoria.

His first wife made paintings of flowers in Hong Kong. They had several children before she died in childbirth in 1872. His second wife was Charlotte Page Kneebone Hance (1846–1911).

Hance is buried with his second wife Charlotte in Hong Kong Cemetery.
