= Former Residence of Hu Xueyan =

- 胡雪岩故居
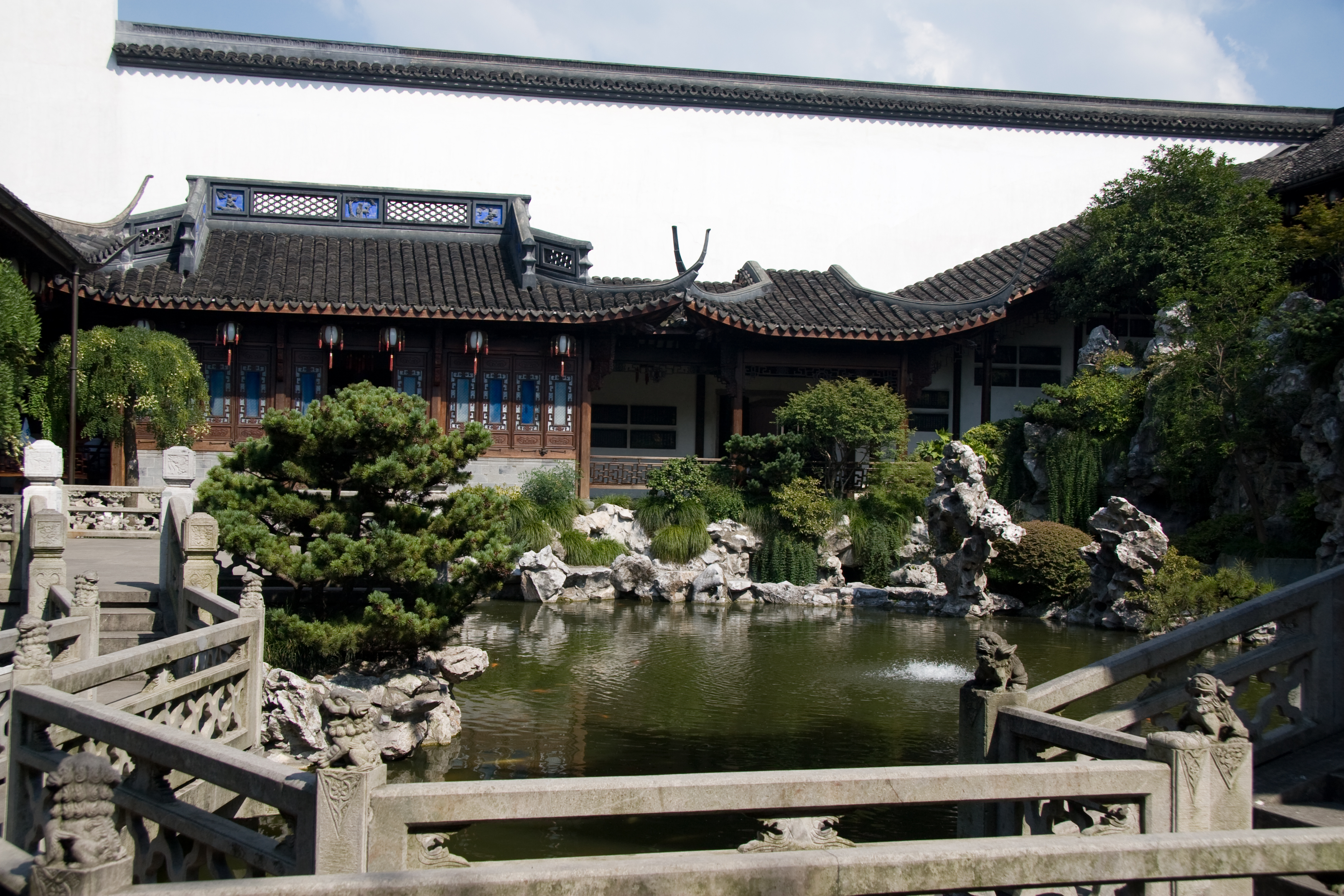
- Main pond and grottos at the residence

- Location within Zhejiang

General information
- Type: Traditional folk houses
- Architectural style: Jiangnan Chinese
- Location: Shangcheng District, Hangzhou, Zhejiang, China
- Coordinates: 30°14′35″N 120°10′46″E
- Groundbreaking: 1872
- Completed: 1875
- Opened: 2001
- Cost: 100,000 tl.
- Owner: Hangzhou Municipal Government

Technical details
- Material: Bricks and wood
- Floor area: 5,815 m^{2} (62,590 sq ft)
- Grounds: 7,200 m^{2} (78,000 sq ft)

Former Residence of Hu Xueyan
- Traditional Chinese: 胡雪巖故居
- Simplified Chinese: 胡雪岩故居
- Literal meaning: Former Residence of Hu Xueyan
Transcriptions
Standard Mandarin
- Hanyu Pinyin: Hú Xuěyán Gùjū
- Wade–Giles: Hu Hsüeh-yan Ku-chü

The Former Residence of Hu Xueyan is a nationally protected traditional Chinese mansion and Jiangnan-style garden at No. 18 Yuanbao Street (元宝街18号) in Shangcheng District, Hangzhou, the provincial capital of Zhejiang, China. Located just east of the Zhonghe Elevated Road (中河高架) southeast of West Lake, the residence forms part of the city's Qinghefang Historic District.

== History ==
Hu Guangyong—better known by his courtesy name Xueyan—was a notable Chinese banker, TCM advocate, and "red hat merchant" during the latter Qing dynasty. He supported the careers of Wang Youling (zh:王有龄, Wáng Yǒulíng) and Zuo Zongtang, opposed the Taiping Rebellion, and bankrolled some of the modernization of the Qing Army and Navy, winning a great deal of support in turn from both provincial and national officials before bankrupting himself in a failed attempt to repeatedly corner the silk market in the 1880s.

Hu began construction of this residence in 1872 during the reign of the Tongzhi Emperor. The team of more than 500 laborers completed work three years later in 1875, covering an area of 10.8 mu (0.72 hectares or 1.8 acres) at an estimated cost of 100,000 taels (3,400–3,800 kg or 7,500–8,400 lb of silver). The Jiangnan gardens' rockwork was designed by Yin Zhi and erected by craftsmen including Wei Shifu.

At the height of his wealth, Hu was said to have maintained a harem of as many as 100 concubines, many taken in raids against the Taipings and other rebels. Hu was a connoisseur of footbinding and related footwear and his home subsequently acquired a legendary status among Chinese foot fetishists, with stories of women ordered by foot size and restricted to specific styles of shoes appropriate to their class. The women were supposedly similarly banned from wearing dresses, with Hu feeling that pants accentuated the pointed effect of their tiny shoes.

After Hu's 1884 bankruptcy, the residence was acquired first by the Manchu official Wen Yu (zh:文煜, Wén Yù) and then by the banker and bibliophile Jiang Yizhi (zh:蒋抑卮, Jiǎng Yìzhī) and his heirs.

After the establishment of the People's Republic of China in 1949, the mansion was requisitioned for use by Hangzhou's financial school. In 1958, it was used for a high school. In the 1960s, it was assigned to the Hangzhou Municipal Bureau of Culture, which used it first for the China Academy of Art and then to house various municipal performance troupes. In the 1970s, as part of the Cultural Revolution, the residence was converted into the Hangzhou Cutting Tool Factory (杭州刃具厂, Hángzhōu Rènjùchǎng).

The surviving estate was protected as a cultural relic at the city level on 12 January 1992. In 2000, it was decided to restore the property to its Qing-era appearance and to place it under the administration of the Hangzhou Museum. The property's furniture was restored by Xu Jianping. After months of work, it was opened to the public on 20 January 2001. In April 2005, it was inscribed as a provincial-level key cultural unit by the Zhejiang Provincial Government. On 25 May 2006, it was designated a "State Cultural Protection Relic Unit" by the State Council of China.

== Gallery ==
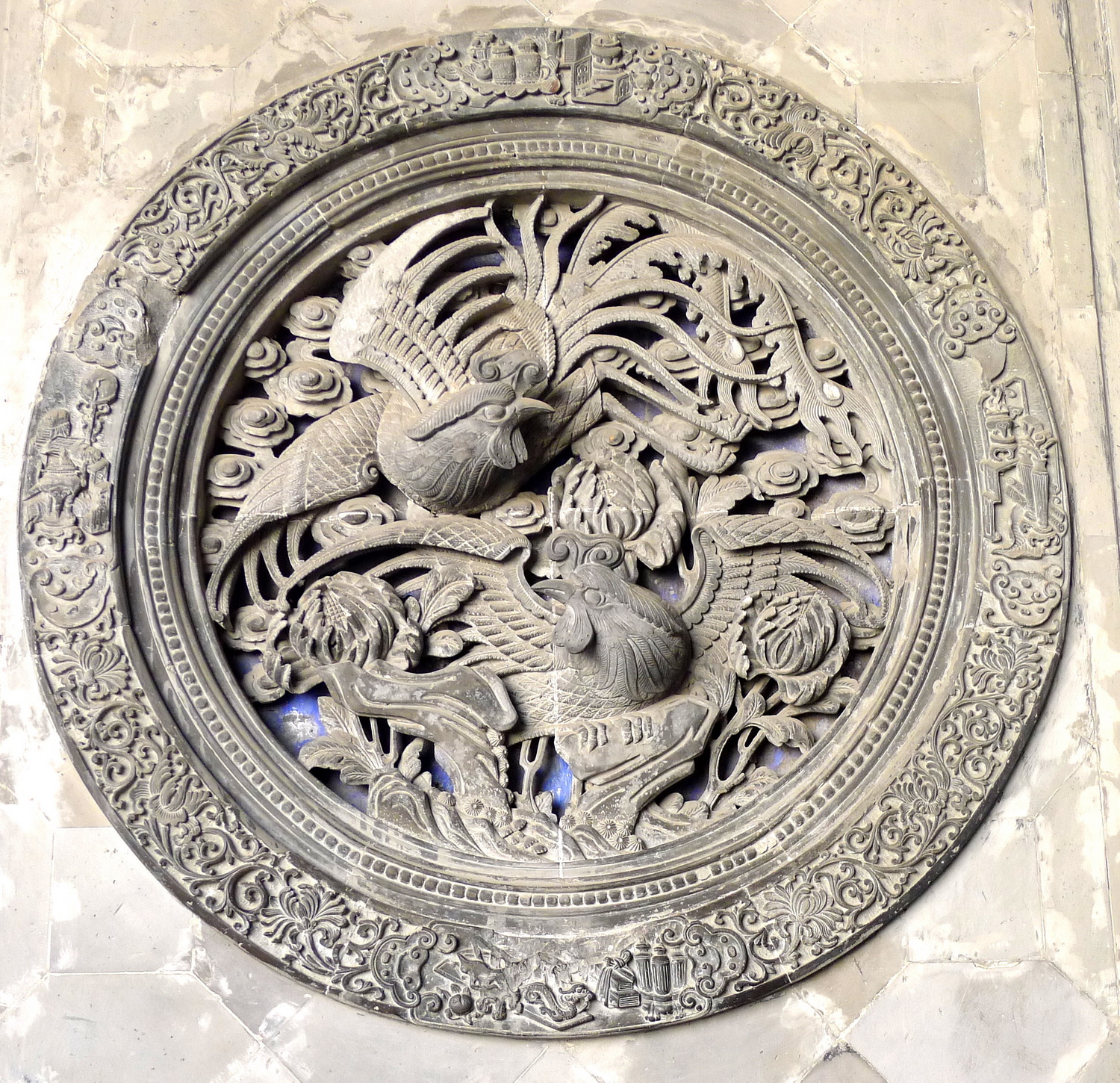
Carved brickwork

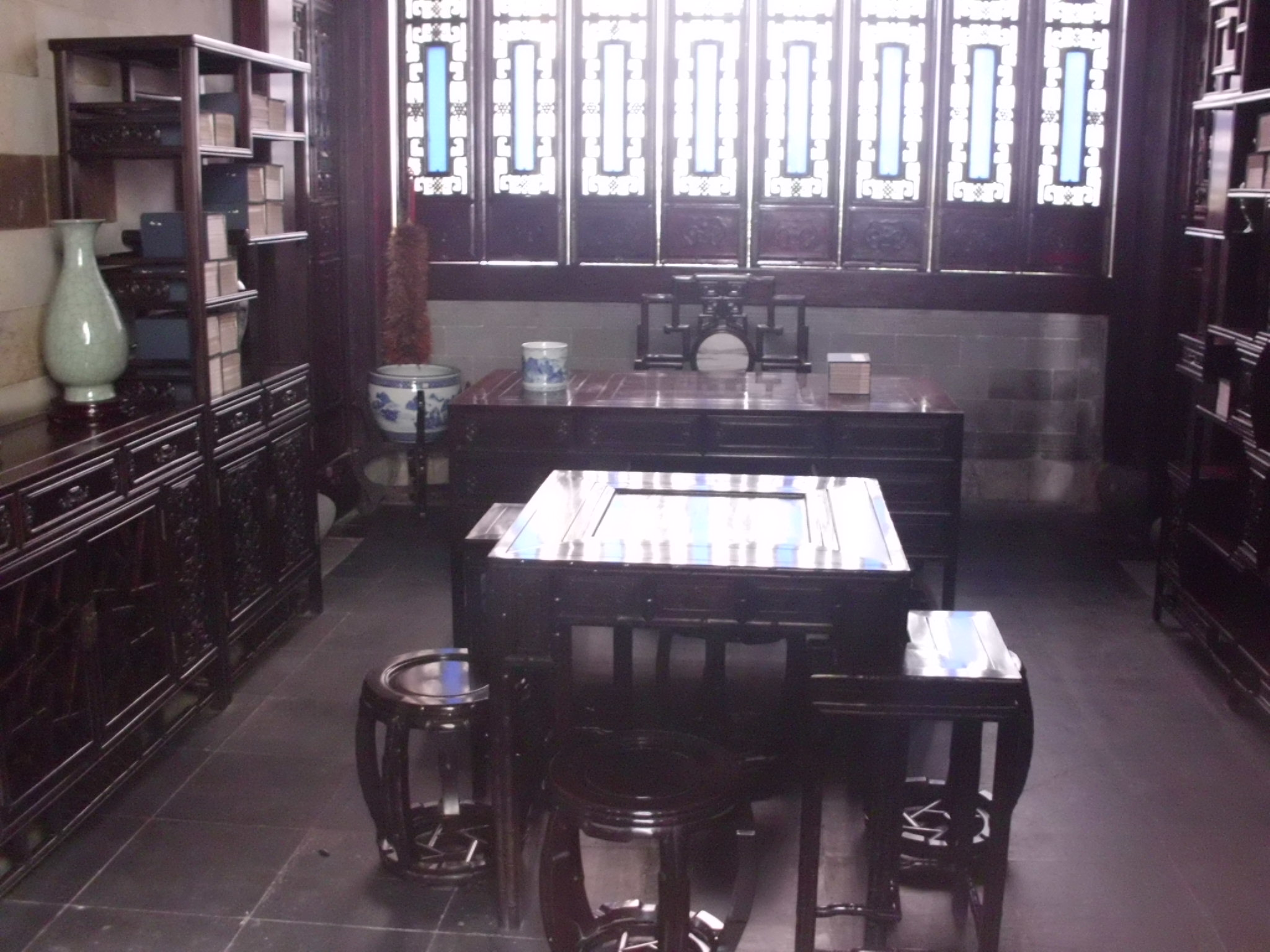
Restored interior decoration

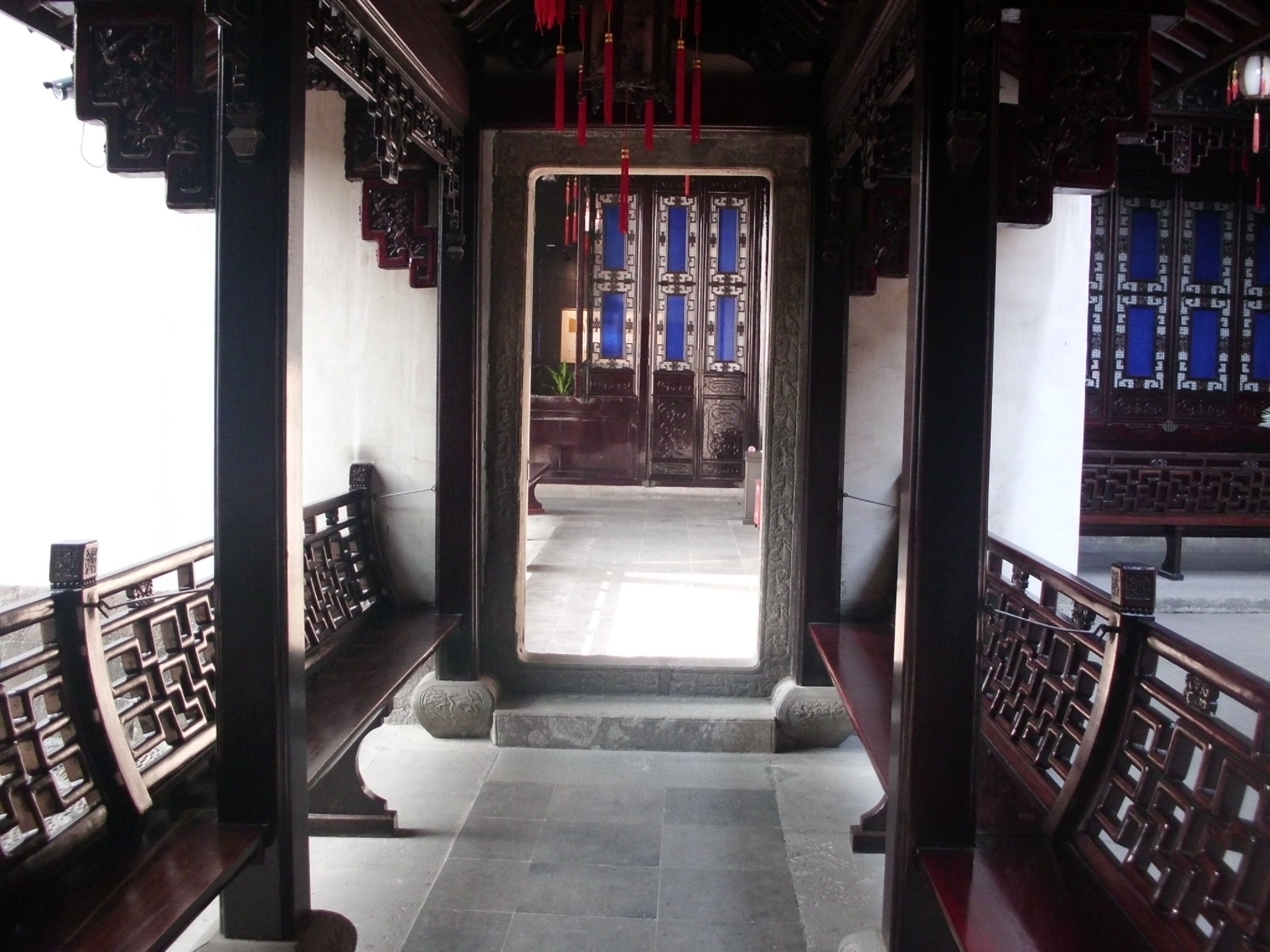
Corridor

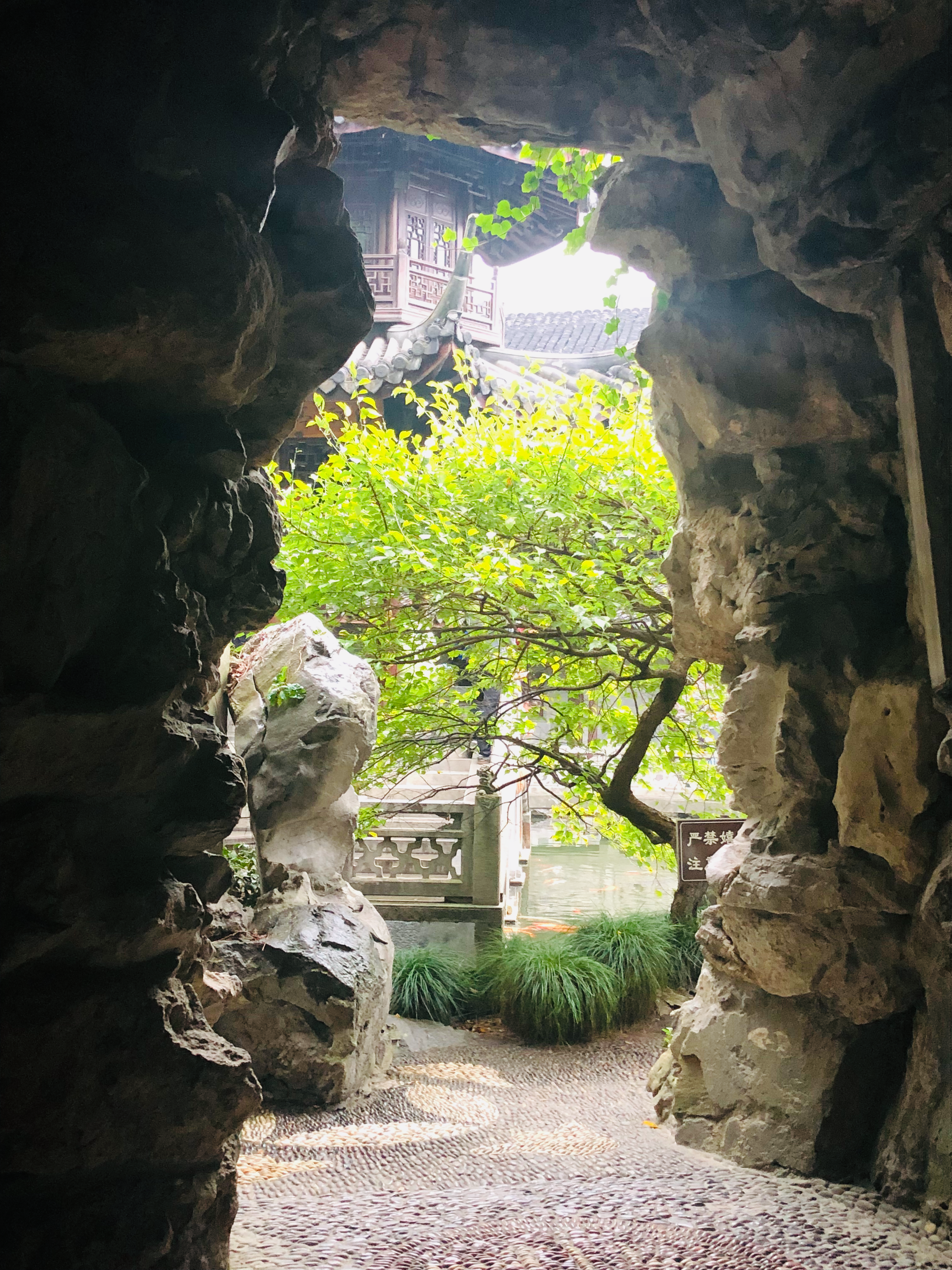
View from one of the grottoes

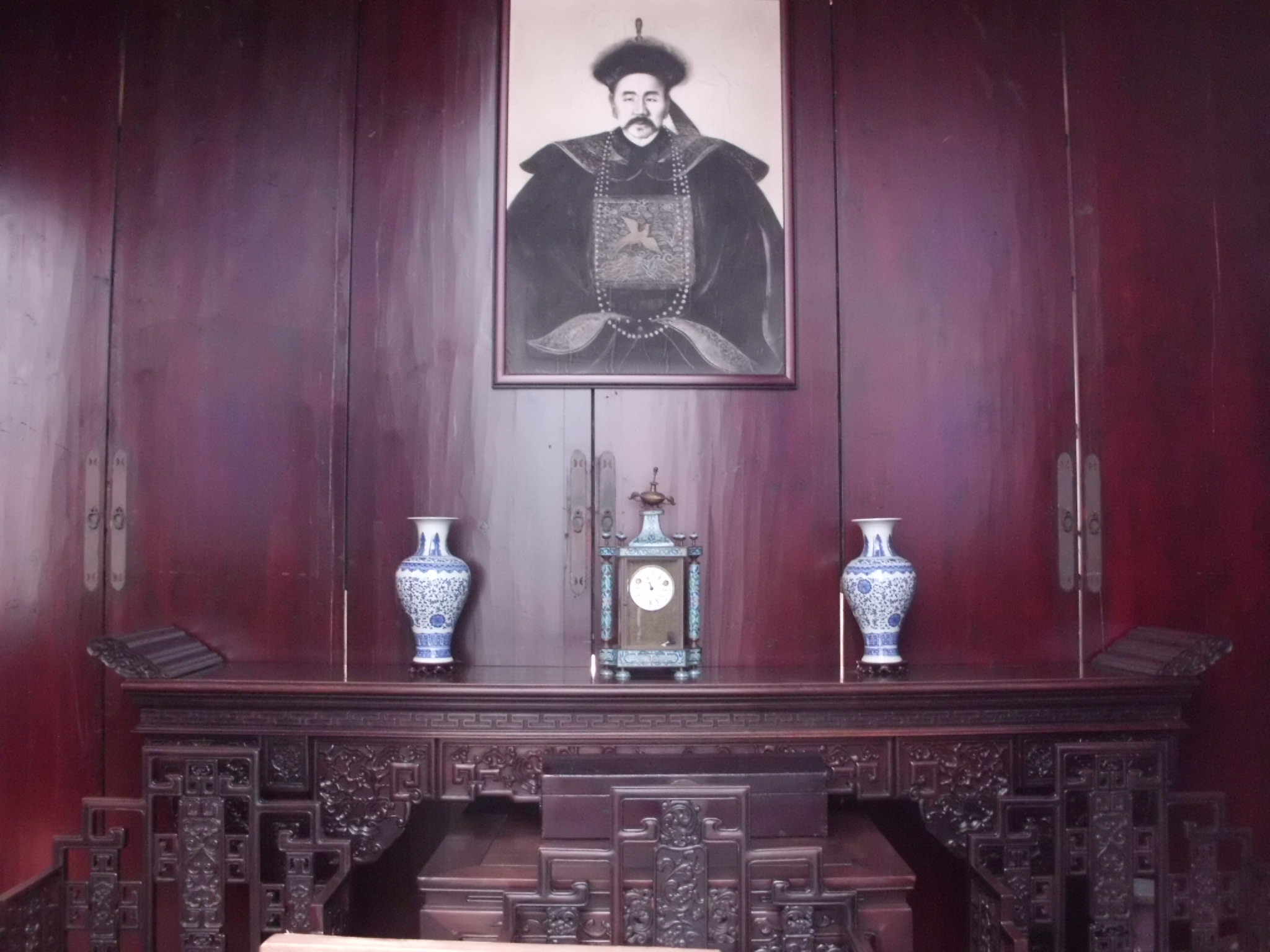
Portrait of Hu Xueyan

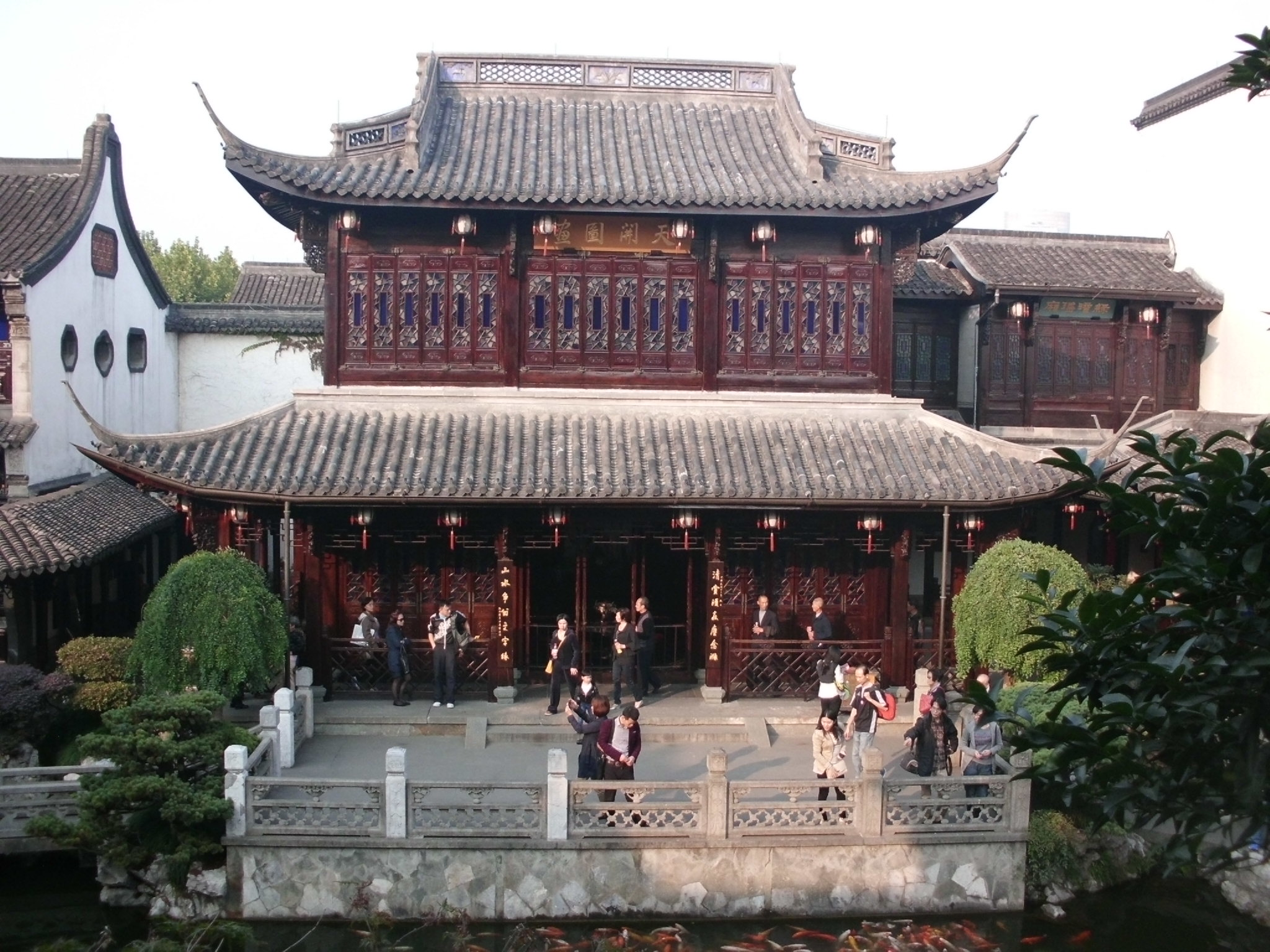
Performance stage

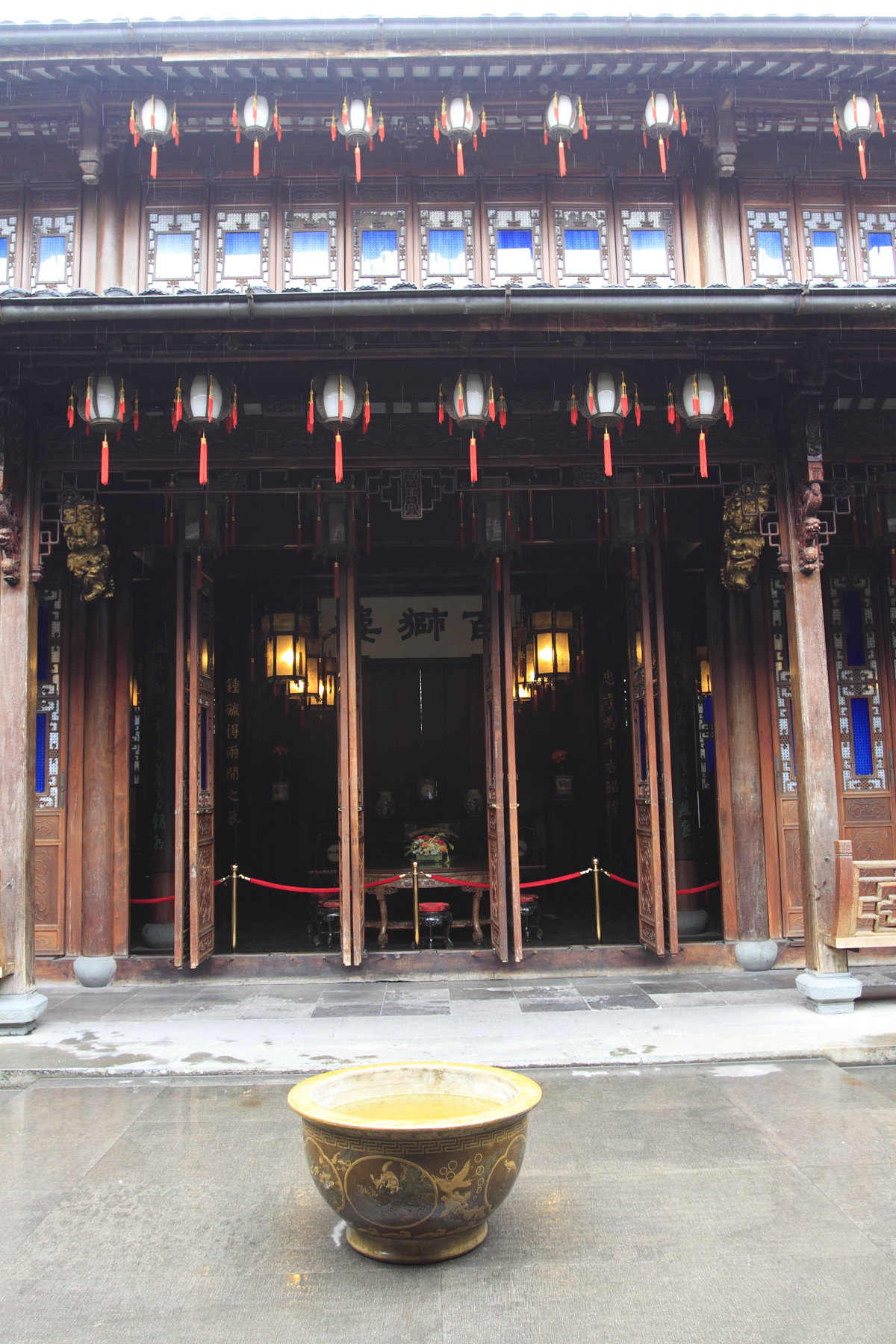
Hundred Lions Building (百狮楼)

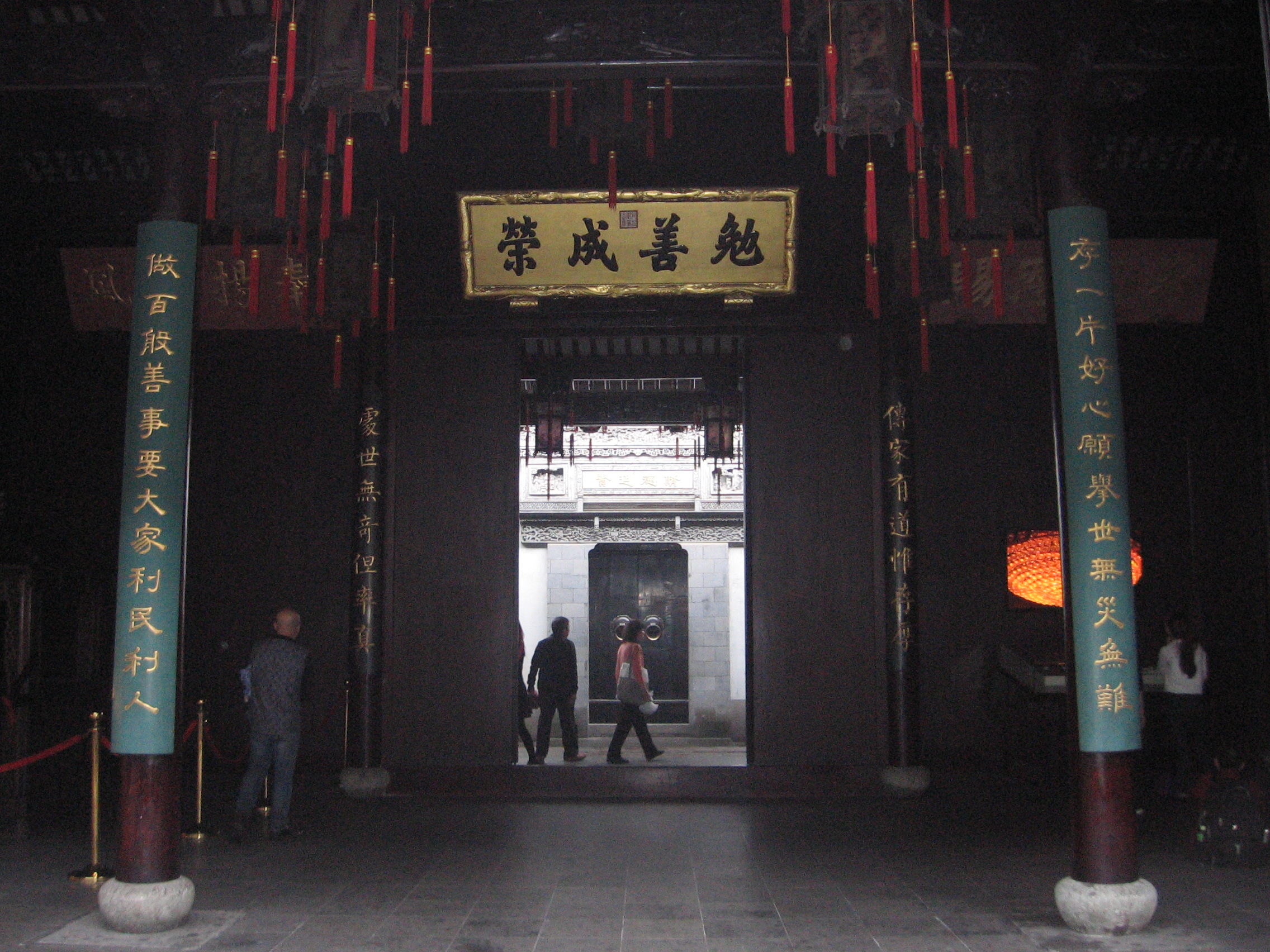
Entrance

== See also ==
- Hu Qingyu Tang, a nearby TCM museum commemorating a treatment center established by Hu Xueyan
