= Bokoharjo =

Village in Yogyakarta

- Kalurahan (village)
- Location within Java
- Coordinates: 7°45′56.262″S 110°29′18.282″E
- Country: Indonesia
- Province: Yogyakarta
- Regency: Sleman Regency
- District: Prambanan

Area
  - Total: 2.4 km^{2} (0.93 sq mi)

Population (2020)
  - Total: 12,000
  - Density: 5,000/km^{2} (13,000/sq mi)
- Time zone: UTC+7 (WIB)
- Postal code: 55572

Bokoharjo is a kalurahan (village) in the Prambanan district of Sleman Regency, Special Region of Yogyakarta, Indonesia. It serves as the administrative seat of Prambanan district, since the district office is located within its boundaries. The village is known for its cultural heritage, as it contains part of the Prambanan temple complex and the Ratu Boko archaeological site. Besides agriculture, the local economy is also supported by cultural tourism, which has grown alongside rising visitor numbers to the Prambanan area.

== History ==
Before 1953, the area now known as Bokoharjo consisted of three separate villages: Prambanan Lama, Jobohan Lama, and Marangan Lama. On 19 April 1953, these three villages were merged into a single administrative unit and formally recognised by the government of the Special Region of Yogyakarta under the name Bokoharjo. The name Bokoharjo derives from the nearby Ratu Boko site, combined with the suffix -harjo, which is commonly used in village names throughout the Special Region of Yogyakarta.

== Geography ==
=== Location and boundaries ===
Bokoharjo is located in the southeastern part of Sleman Regency, approximately 20 kilometres, or about a 30-minute drive, from the centre of Sleman Regency. The village borders Madurejo village to the south and Tirtomartani village in Kalasan district to the west, while its eastern boundary adjoins Klaten Regency in Central Java province. The village covers an area of approximately 240 hectares (2.4 square kilometres).

=== Topography ===
The topography of Bokoharjo is dominated by hilly terrain that forms part of the Baturagung Mountains. This landscape gives the area extensive scenic views and has also provided the elevated sites on which several archaeological monuments were built. Because of its position within a nationally designated heritage area, spatial planning in Bokoharjo is also guided by the government's National Strategic Tourism Area (Kawasan Strategis Pariwisata Nasional, KSPN) framework.

== Government ==
Within the administrative structure of the Special Region of Yogyakarta, Bokoharjo has the status of a kalurahan under Prambanan district, Sleman Regency. The village government is headed by a lurah (village head), assisted by village officials, in accordance with the village governance arrangements specific to the Special Region of Yogyakarta. The Bokoharjo village office is located on Jalan Prambanan–Piyungan, Kilometre 1, Bokoharjo, Prambanan, Sleman.

Administratively, Bokoharjo is divided into 13 hamlets (padukuhan), comprising 21 sub-hamlets (kampung) and 76 neighbourhood units (rukun tetangga, RT). The hamlets are Cepit, Dawung, Gatak, Jamusan, Jirak, Jobohan, Klurak Baru, Kranggan, Majasem, Marangan, Pelemsari, Pulerejo, and Ringinsari.

== Demographics ==
According to data compiled in the Prambanan District in Figures (Kecamatan Prambanan Dalam Angka) publication issued by the Central Statistics Agency (BPS) of Sleman Regency, Bokoharjo had a population of approximately 12,000 in 2020, making it one of the more populous villages in Prambanan district. A separate source, population administration data from Indonesia's Ministry of Home Affairs (Kemendagri) as compiled by a regional data portal, records a different figure of approximately 4,885. The discrepancy likely stems from differing methodologies: BPS figures are based on population census, while Kemendagri figures reflect registered residents in the national civil registration system (KTP/KK). Readers seeking current data should consult the latest BPS Sleman Regency publication or Indonesia's civil registration agency (Dukcapil) directly.

Most residents work in agriculture, trade, and services, alongside occupations related to tourism and the creative economy in the Prambanan area. Growth in tourism has encouraged the development of small businesses, homestays, restaurants, and tour guide services in the village.

== Tourism and cultural heritage ==
Bokoharjo is one of the most significant villages within the Prambanan cultural heritage landscape, as it hosts several important archaeological sites.

=== Ratu Boko ===
Ratu Boko, also known as the Ratu Boko Palace, is an 8th-century archaeological complex closely associated with the history of the Mataram Kingdom. The site is believed to have been built during the reign of Rakai Panangkaran of the Buddhist Sailendra dynasty, as recorded in the Abhayagiriwihara inscription dated 792 CE. It was later taken over by Hindu Mataram rulers, so the surviving structures display a blend of both Buddhist and Hindu architectural influences.

Administratively, the Ratu Boko complex spans two hamlets: Dawung, within Bokoharjo, and Sumberwatu, within the neighbouring village of Sambirejo. The site sits atop a hill at an elevation of roughly 110 to 229 metres above sea level and covers an area of about 25 hectares, including gates, retaining walls, pools, and caves. Ratu Boko was first documented by the Dutch surveyor Van Boeckholtz in 1790, and has since been the subject of ongoing archaeological research into the early 20th century. Today, it is one of the leading historical tourist destinations in the Special Region of Yogyakarta, particularly noted for sunset views overlooking the distant Prambanan temple complex.

=== Prambanan temple complex ===
Part of the Prambanan temple complex, the largest Hindu temple compound in Indonesia and a UNESCO World Heritage Site since 1991, also lies administratively within Bokoharjo. The temple complex sits almost exactly on the boundary between the Special Region of Yogyakarta and Central Java, so its grounds are split between two separate administrative areas: Bokoharjo village in Prambanan district, Sleman Regency, and Tlogo village in Prambanan district, Klaten Regency, Central Java. This makes Bokoharjo one of the two villages that directly administer part of the temple complex, reinforcing its role as a core area within the broader Prambanan heritage landscape.

=== Other heritage sites ===
Besides Ratu Boko and part of the Prambanan complex, Bokoharjo is also home to other temple remains, including Banyunibo. These sites make Bokoharjo an important part of the wider cultural heritage area, supporting archaeological research, education, and tourism. Further information on these sites is available through a digital heritage exhibition developed by a community service (KKN-PPM) team from Gadjah Mada University.

== Economy ==
The local economy is primarily supported by agriculture, trade, and services. In recent years, tourism has become an increasingly important driver of the local economy, through the provision of accommodation, food and beverage services, tourist transport, and small-scale creative economy products catering to visitors to the Prambanan and Ratu Boko areas. The village government has also supported local economic development through the village-owned enterprise (BUMDes) Boko Makmur, which manages tourism activities in the Ketapang area and around the Banyunibo temple.
