= Hu Qing Yu Tang =

Traditional Chinese medicine museum and drugstore

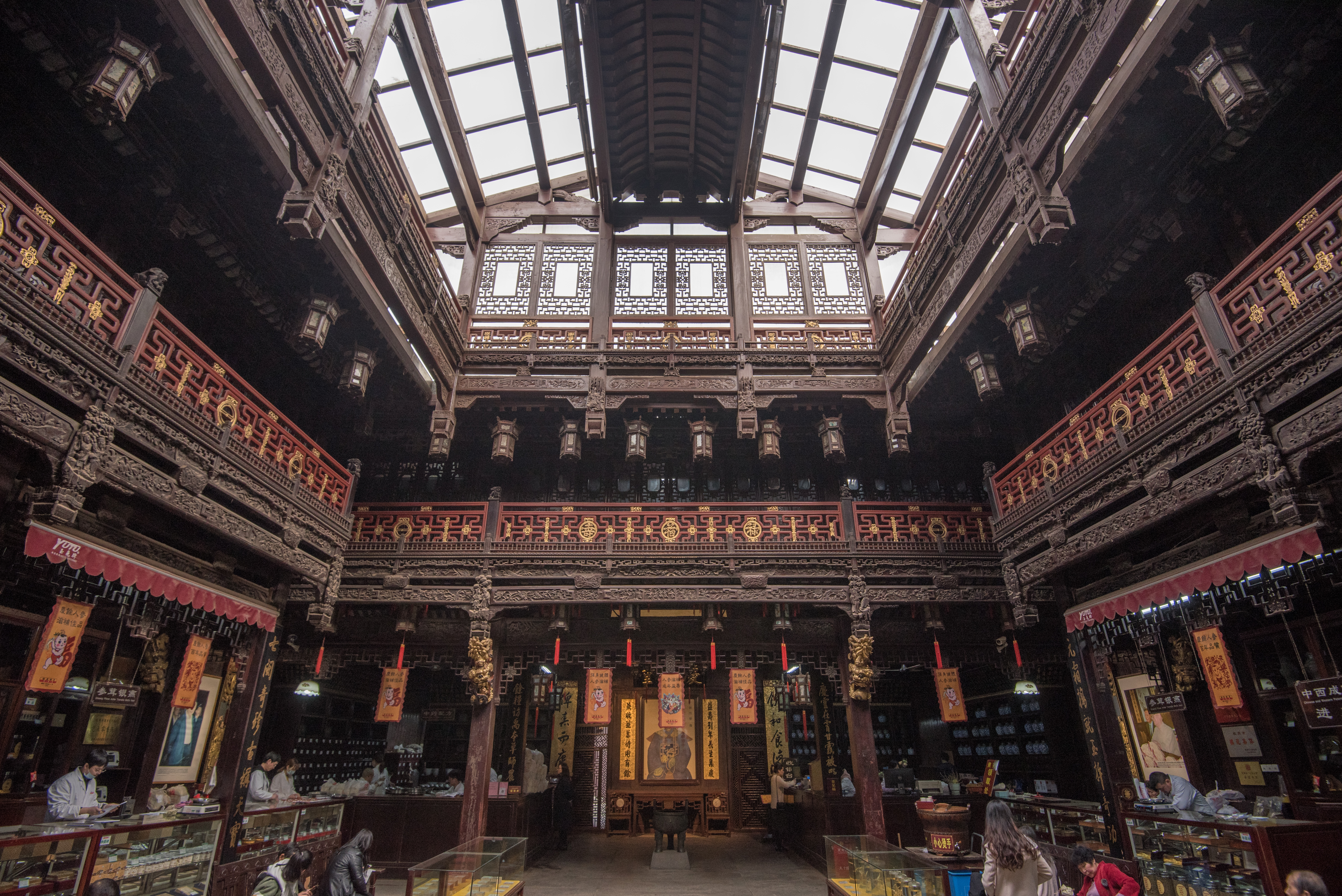
- Main hall
- Traditional Chinese: 胡慶余堂
- Simplified Chinese: 胡庆余堂
Transcriptions
Standard Mandarin
- Hanyu Pinyin: Hú Qìng Yú Táng
- Wade–Giles: Hu Ch'ing Yü T'ang

Hu Qing Yu Tang was an important center of traditional Chinese medicine in the late 19th and early 20th century. Its site at 95 Dajing Lane (大井巷95号) in central Hangzhou, China, is now a TCM museum and drugstore with a prestigious reputation at the same level as the Tongrentang in Beijing.

== Site ==
The Hu Qing Yu Tang was established by Hu Xueyan in 1874. Its main buildings were designed in the Jiangnan architectural style. Its drugstore opened in 1878 at a cost of more than 200,000 taels—twice the amount he spent on his own nearby mansion—and operated on the principle of Taiping Huimin and the Bureau agents (太平惠民和剂局方). It made more than four hundred types of drug by collecting secret prescriptions, proved recipes and combining clinical practice.

== Museum of Traditional Chinese Medicines ==
Hu Qing Yu Tang is now the site of Hangzhou's Museum of Traditional Chinese Medicines. In 1988, its site became a national key cultural relics protection unit. There are five parts:

1. The exhibition hall, which introduces celebrities in Chinese medicine history, the origin of medicine, the development of pharmaceutics, the exchanges of China and foreign countries in medicine and the contributions of Zhejiang Province in the development of medicine.
2. Chinese medicine manual mill hall, where experienced pharmaceutical workers show visitors traditional pharmaceutical process and visitors can experience by themselves.
3. Patient room of traditional Chinese medicine health care
4. The hall of medicated food
5. Business lobby, where visitors can use the pharmaceutical tools and buy Chinese drugs.

Hu Qing Yu Tang participated in World Leisure Expo for a healthy life in September 2011.

== See also ==
- Hu Xueyan Mansion, a nearby museum preserving Hu Xueyan's Jiangnan-style mansion and gardens
