= Township and Village Enterprises =

Chinese local public businesses

Township and Village Enterprises (TVEs, simplified Chinese: 乡镇企业; traditional Chinese: 鄉鎮企業; pinyin: Xiāngzhèn qǐyè) are rural, industrial and commercial enterprises that played a central role in China’s economic reforms during the 1980s and 1990s. Although often described as collectively owned, the term primarily refers to enterprises located in townships and villages in China rather than to a specific ownership structure. Emerging from earlier commune and brigade enterprises, TVEs expanded rapidly after the 1978 reform and opening-up policies, becoming a major source of rural employment and industrial output. By the mid-1990s, they accounted for a substantial share of China’s non-state industrial production before undergoing significant restructuring and privatization. Some scholars characterize TVEs as a transitional form between collective ownership and market-oriented initiatives. Others argue that the functionality of TVEs is more akin to private businesses, even though they were officially labeled as "collective enterprises".

== History ==
=== Before the Reform and Opening ===
Although Chinese paramount leader Deng Xiaoping was reported to have said that TVEs "appear(ed) out of nowhere" in 1987, the industrial development in rural China could be traced back to as early as 1950s. During this period, rural enterprises, often with names "commune and brigade enterprises" and of neglectable size, served as a supplement to those state-owned enterprises (SOE), which mainly focused on heavy industrial sectors, and were established by the people's communes and bridges to support agricultural production and to produce rural social products for local and domestic needs. The political turmoil between late 1950s and early 1960s, like the Great Leap Forward, at one time halted the development of rural enterprises and some were suspended. Nevertheless, encouraged by the Chinese government to produce rural social goods, the enthusiasm of rural enterprises increased again in 1965. Despite the central government's support, the rise of TVEs was primarily a bottom-up venture driven by peasants and local officials. According to official records, the number of rural enterprise was about 122,000 in 1965, and quickly increased to 447,000 in 1970. During this period, however, rural enterprises were restricted to certain industrial and agricultural sections, including the production of iron, steel, cement, chemical fertilizer, hydroelectric power, and farm tools.

The Third Front campaign had also contributed to the development of the industrial base and human talent for the subsequent development of TVEs.

=== After 1978 ===
From 1978 to 1988, township enterprises experienced rapid growth due to the preferential treatment under the "reform and opening-up" policy.

Most TVEs emerged during the reform and opening up period in the 1980s (Huang, 2008). There were only 1.5 million in 1978, at the start of the Reform period, and after the State Council of China first officially used the term "Township and Village Enterprises" in March, 1984, number of TVEs had been over 12 millions by 1985, with collective TVEs employing 41.5 million people and private-run TVEs employing a total of 4.75 million people. The reforms of 1978 changed TVEs, which became the most vibrant part of the Chinese economy as they experienced significant expansion in the 1980s and early 1990s. This rapid growth and expansion is one of the primary reasons that a capitalist-adjacent venture such as TVEs was deemed as "socialism compatible" by the Party. However, from 1989 to 1991, these enterprises faced challenges due to the blending of government administration with enterprise operations, marking a period of transition and restructuring.

After Deng Xiaoping's Southern Tour from 1992 to 1996, the township enterprises entered a phase of accelerated development and emerged with a new image following the transition and restructuring. TVE employment grew from 28 million in 1978 to a peak of 135 million in 1996. Likewise, production of TVEs increased to 1.8 trillion yuan in 1992 from 49 billion yuan in 1978. More than half of TVE production in the 1980s occurred in the east coastal and central provinces like Guangdong, Fujian, Zhejiang, Jiangsu, Shandong, and Hunan provinces. In Jiangsu and Shandong TVEs employed some 30 percent of the rural workforce. However, it should be noticed that many TVEs are specialized in the production of labor-intensive commodities without higher technological requirement.

In a strategy which came to be known by the slogan "wearing a red hat," some private entrepreneurs obtained permission from townships and villages to register their private enterprises as TVEs in order to avoid restrictions on the number of employees a small private business could have. Registering as a TVE also provided these companies with legal protection and allowed them to appear "socialist" during a time when private businesses where highly restricted. This "loophole" allowed businesses to operate on a much larger scale, allowing growth from the private household business that dominated this period.

As private ownership became less politically-controversial after the mid-1990s, the TVEs' proportionate share of the national economy declined. Many were either privatized or turned into shareholding companies.

The decline of TVEs in the mid 1990s was also linked to increased competition from private and foreign firms, which reduced many of the advantages TVEs previously had. At the same time, changes in fiscal policy and market conditions made the structure of TVEs less effective in the growingly competitive economy.

Even after their decline, TVEs played an instrumental role in China's early industrialization and helped lay the foundation for later economic growth (especially in rural areas).

The relative decline of TVEs was also influenced by the 1994 tax-sharing reform.

== Notable characteristics ==
=== Locations and Ownership ===
Many of these firms were “collectively owned” in the sense that theoretical ownership rested with the collectives, either as a legacy of earlier sponsorship, or because township and village governments took the lead in establishing new TVEs after the breakup of the agricultural collectives. Ultimate “ownership rights” stayed with the collective, while “use rights” were delegated to managers in collective TVEs. The complexity of this arrangement led to the labeling of collective (township and village) TVE property rights as “fuzzy.” In practice, this meant that managers had a high degree of control over day-to-day operations, which created incentives more similar to that of private ownership. The flexibility of property rights that this institutional arrangement allowed during the reform period became increasingly difficult to sustain as market competition intensified in the mid-1990s.

TVEs referred to the location of the enterprises, as opposed to the ownership structure. That is, TVE never referred to only companies owned by township and villages; rather, TVE refers to companies located in townships and villages. Huang (2008) quotes a Chinese Ministry of Agriculture document from 1984 in support of this: TVEs include enterprises sponsored by townships and villages, the alliance enterprises [private stock companies] formed by peasants, other alliance enterprises, and individual enterprises." Some collective TVEs were notable for their unique ownership and corporate governance setup.

TVEs were very flexible in terms of organizational and ownership structure. While some were run by local governments, others were more genuinely independent in nature. Wong has shown that through the 1980s most of the supposedly collective TVEs operated as private enterprises in practice.

TVEs developed most rapidly in locations where central planning had produced poor results, either through shortages or non-useful surpluses.

=== Comparable advantages ===
The hybrid status of TVEs as neither state-owned nor privately owned provided significant advantages within the reforming economy of China. Because they were not state-owned, TVEs were not restrained by state planning policies or price control. And because they were not private, they were not politically controversial.

TVEs also provided local levels of government with revenue opportunities after the reform-era introduced fiscal contracting, a system in which each level of government remitted a specified amount of tax upward to the higher level of government and retained the excess. TVE profits, however, could be kept entirely at the local level. They were deemed non-tax revenues for village collectives and townships governments. TVEs could also contribute to local government revenues through value added tax (VAT), which had to be paid by regardless of whether a TVE was profitable.

TVEs were formally responsible for their own profits and losses. They needed to obtain all production factors (capital, raw materials, technology, personnel, and so on) from the market, use independent distribution and supply channels and operated under flexible management with little interference of government, etc. However, many TVEs benefited from preferential access to local bank credit and informal government support during the early reform period.

=== Socioeconomic Background ===
After reaching peak employment and output levels in the mid-1990s, the TVE sector entered a period of combination and restructuring, with many enterprises undergoing privatization or organizational transformation rather than outright destruction. Scholars have given a number of reasons for their success. The political institutional environment favored these “public” enterprises during the early years of reform, since private businesses faced severe restrictions and discrimination in terms of resources and regulations. Also, the fiscal decentralization of the early 1980s gave greater decision-making power to local governments and linked fiscal revenue to the career potential of local officials, creating strong incentives for them to promote these enterprises. The TVEs moved in to take advantage of the gaps left in the market by the State-Owned Enterprises to produce colorful elastic bands, ID card holders, etc. The TVEs benefited from first mover advantage as there was no competition in the early stages from private firms due to restrictions on the markets. The pent-up demand in China for a host of products provided ample profit-making opportunities for enterprises operating at this early juncture. Moreover, TVEs were helped by massive loans from the state banking system.

The TVE sector experienced dramatic changes in 1995-1996 (Huang, 2008). Official hostility toward Chinese entrepreneurship during the period of Jiang Zemin's administration caused many to go out of business, with some estimates suggesting that about 30 percent have gone bankrupt. In addition, there has been a massive trend toward privatization. After the mid-1990s, TVEs were forced to restructure substantially. With increased market integration and competition, official discrimination against TVEs, and official preference for foreign-owned enterprises, TVEs lost their competitive position.

Further, the end of directional liberalism in China encouraged local officials to expropriate the TVEs. As competition intensified and credit became harder to obtain, the collectively owned TVE sector grew in comparison to the privately owned TVEs. Rural industries today are more tied to their local government and community and have taken on new forms and roles (Huang, 2008). One of the most striking developments has been the rise of “industrial clusters” of small firms both competing with one another and cooperating to form a relatively complete industrial chain.

== Environmental issue ==
=== Damages ===
According to the World Health Organization (WHO) and United Nations Development Programme (UNDP), TVEs in China are responsible for more than 10 billion metric tons of industrial waste water, which is more than half of the total. According to World bank (1997), It also emit 60% of China's air and water pollution, endangering human health and posing a serious threat to agro-ecosystems. Worse still, this industrial wastewater directly discharges into the water resource without any treatment and control. Polluted water damaged the environment, causing 10 to 20 million hectares of polluted land by 2001. Furthermore, reports showed that artisanal mines, which are mostly TVEs, leak hundreds of tonnes of mercury annually. Some studies suggest that TVEs contributed significantly to pollution given they faced weaker environmental regulation compared to urban industries. In the meantime, as many TVEs were built near population dense areas, this pollution also threatened the population's health nearby. In general, the analysis found that people living near TVEs have a more significant rate of diseases and a shorter lifetime; the unregulated activities made Chinese rural areas pay a huge price for environmental damage.

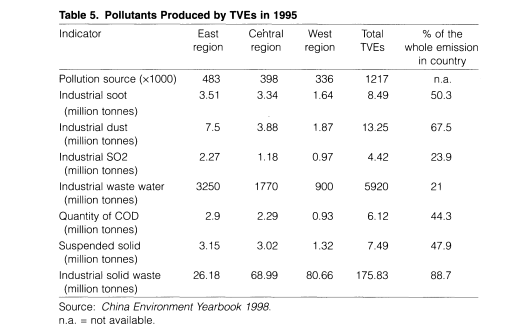
TVEs' pollution in China 1995

=== Controls ===
In response to the climate crisis brought by the TVEs, the government passed a regulation in 1979 that "The transfer of products and production involving toxic and hazardous substances to rural areas is prohibited unless accompanied by the transfer of effective pollution control equipment." The result was unsatisfactory: many harmful activities still existed and ignored the regulation. Moreover, TVEs were based on old and polluted types of equipment that were different from urban spaces, so it was hard to control the pollution due to their locations and large numbers. During the 8th five-year plan, the Chinese government enhanced the policy to deal with the worsening climate crisis. Although the changes focused more on urban cities, TVEs pollution was impacted, especially wastewater.

== Relations to reform and modern China ==
Key political and economic reforms drove the development of TVEs. The transition from collective-based commune production to contract-based household production, coupled with the revival of rural and urban markets, had a significant impact on TVEs growth.

The fiscal decentralization in 1984 allowed local governments to retain profits from TVEs, incentivizing officials to foster economic growth as their promotions were tied to revenue generation. This flexibility allowed TVEs to adjust to market conditions, despite the state's control over enterprise ownership and price regulations.

In 1994, the introduction of the tax-sharing system reestablished central fiscal control. However, it also constrained local government funds, raising concerns about local expenditures. Rural-to-urban migration has increased the demand for housing and infrastructure, leading to a rise in property prices.

== See also ==
- Province (China) (for a discussion of townships and villages).
- Production team (China)
- Village-owned enterprise
