= Tong Ren Tang =

Chinese pharmaceutical company

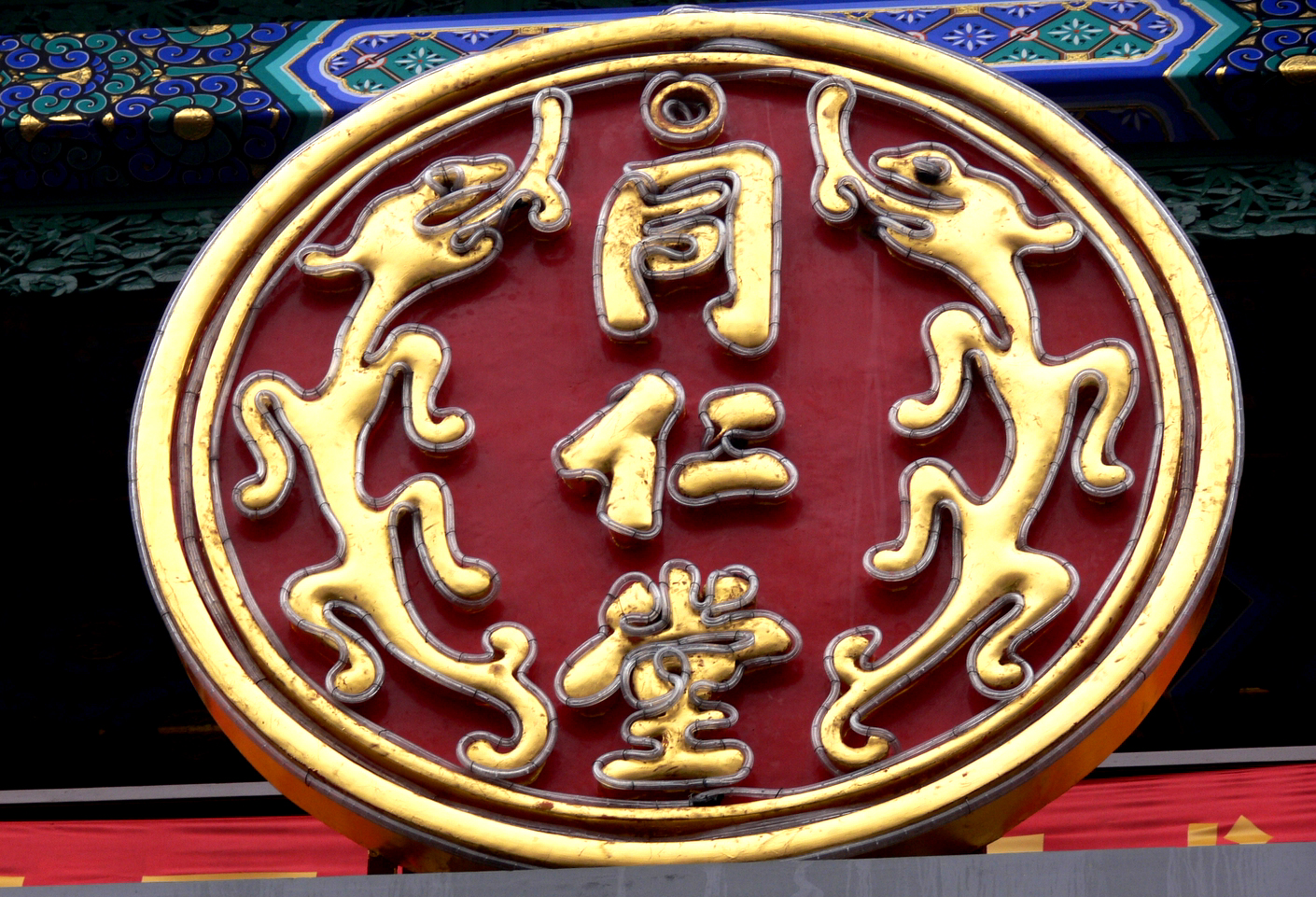
- Tongrentang sign board at the Beijing headquarters
- Native name: 同仁堂
- Romanized name: Tóngréntáng
- Type: Public
- Traded as: SSE: 600085
- Industry: Pharmaceutical
- Founded: 1669
- Founder: Yue Xianyang
- Headquarters: Beijing, China
- Revenue: 396,750,300,000 renminbi (2018)
- Website: www.tongrentang.com

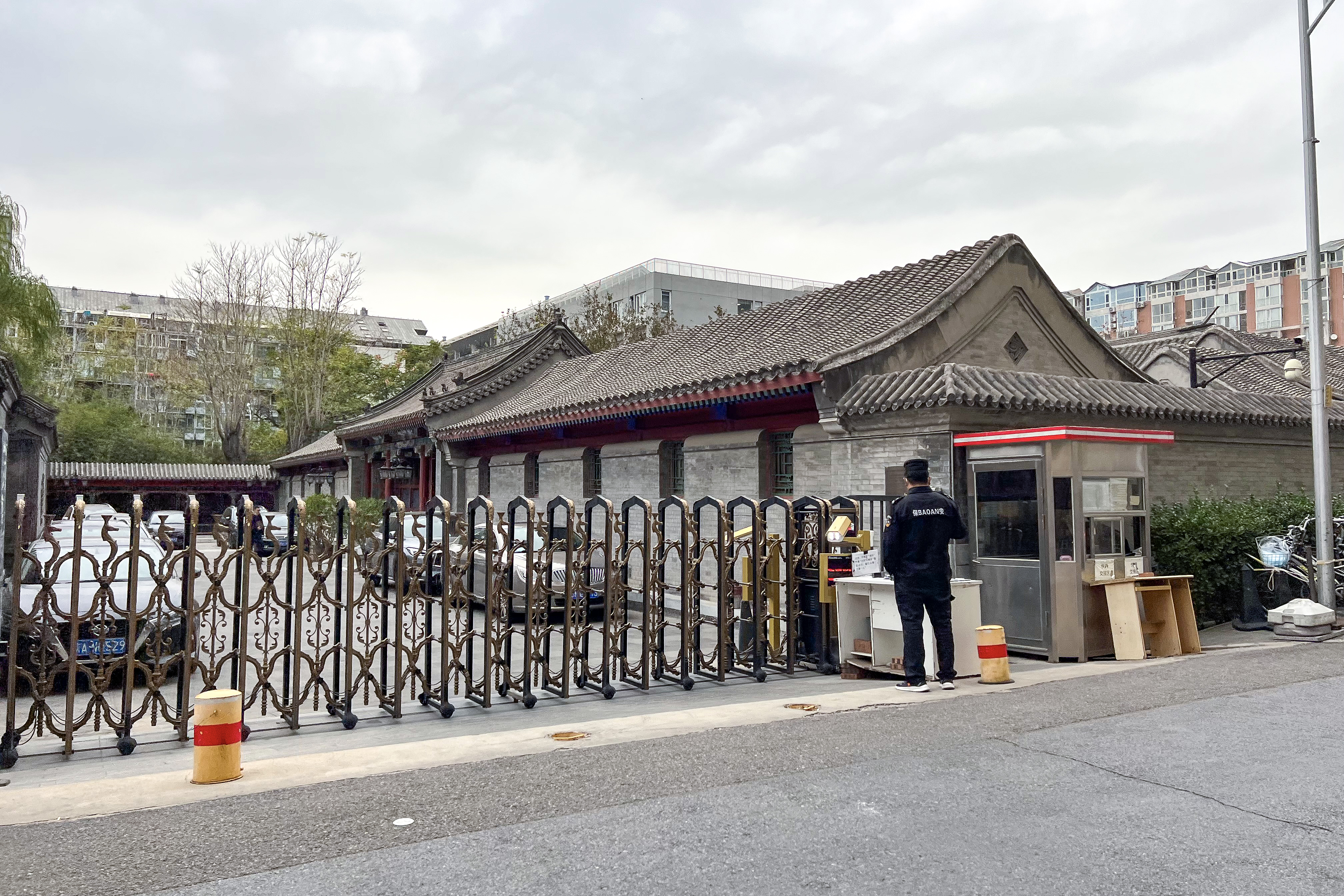
Headquarters of Tongrentang at Chongwenmen, Beijing

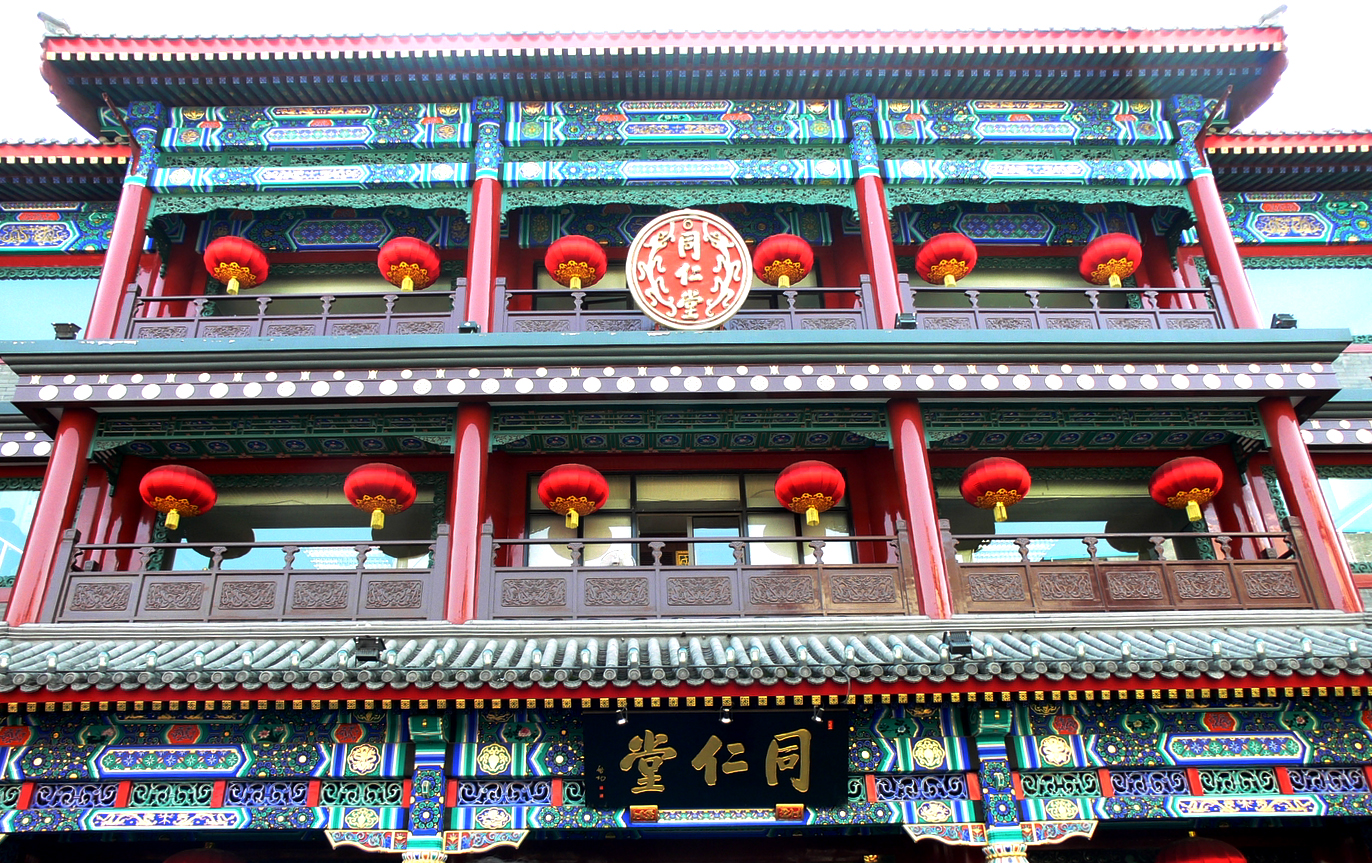
Exterior of the old Tongrentang store in Beijing

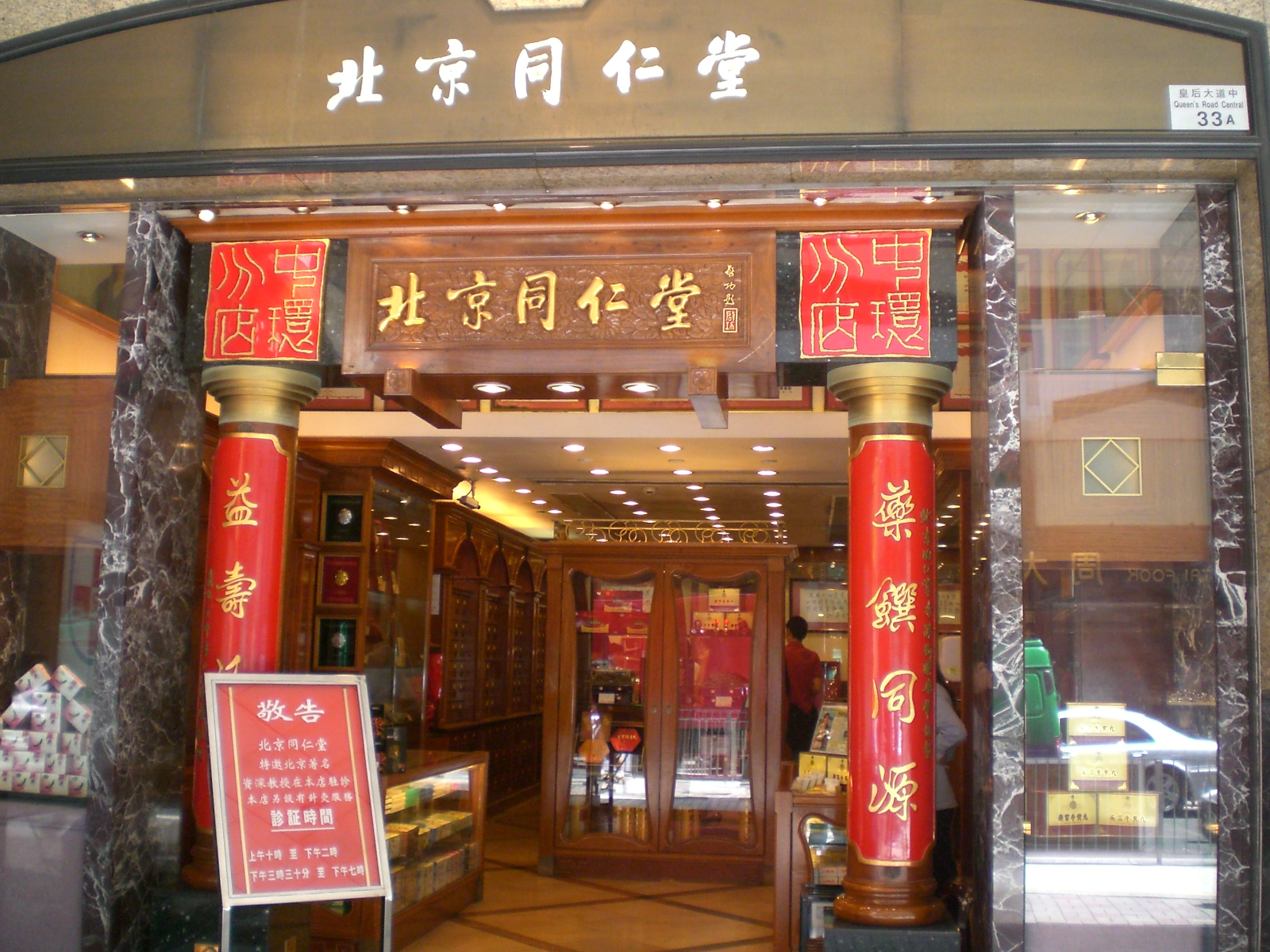
A branch shop in Hong Kong

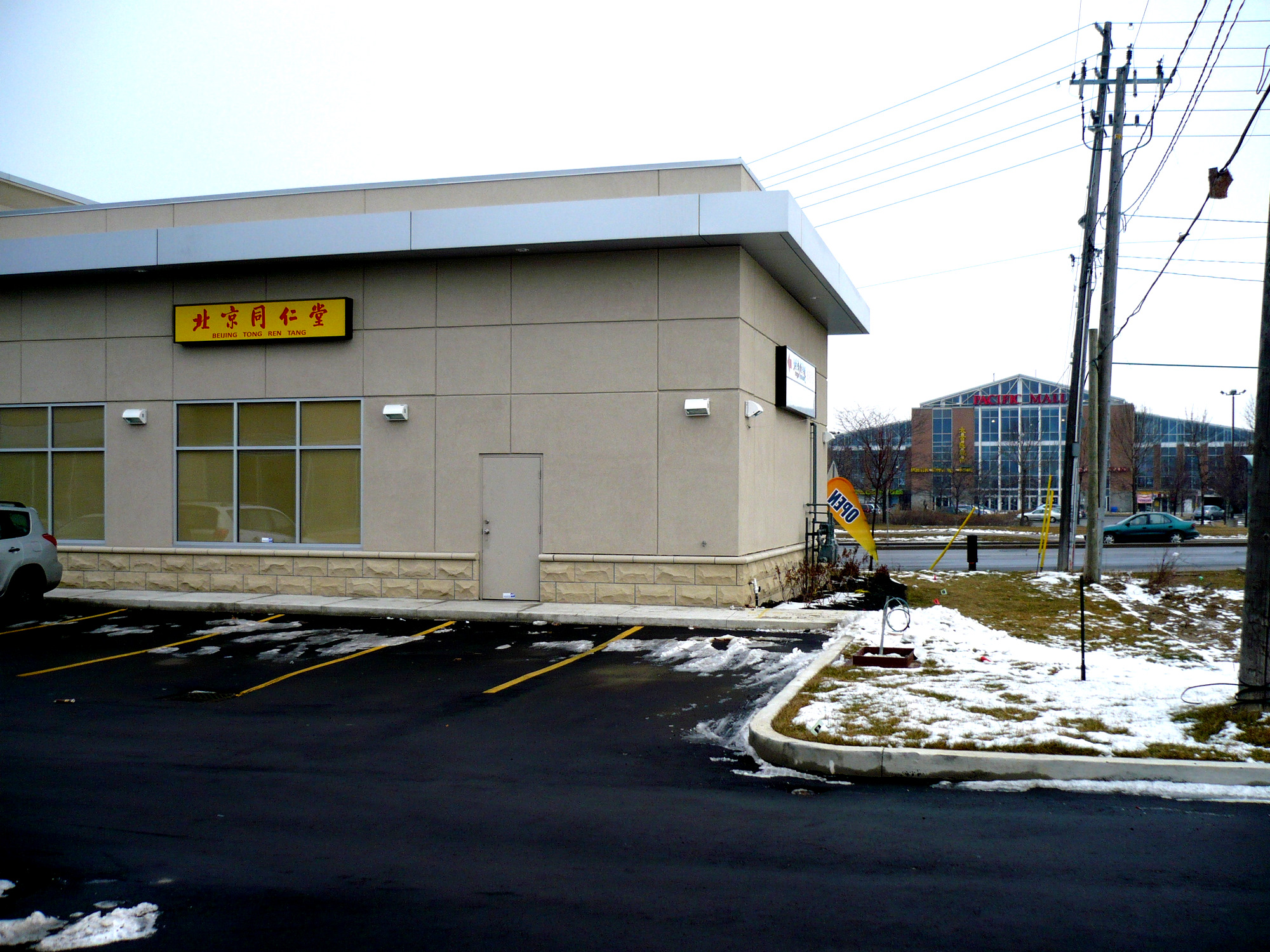
A Tongrentang store in Toronto, Canada

Tong Ren Tang (TRT; Chinese: 同仁堂) is a Chinese pharmaceutical company founded in 1669. It is now the largest producer of traditional Chinese medicine (TCM). The company headquarters are in Beijing, where they engage in both manufacturing and retail sales. It operates drug stores, predominantly in Chinese-speaking regions. Tong Ren Tang is considered one of the "Big 4" traditional Chinese medicine brands still in existence. The four companies include (listed in order of age not size): Guangyuyuan (1541 AD), Guangzhou Chen Liji (1600 AD), Beijing Tong Ren Tang (1669), and Hangzhou Hu Qing Yu Tang (1874). Tong Ren Tang, and GuangYuYuan have been officially recognized as "China Time-Honored Brands" by the Ministry of Commerce of the People's Republic of China.

== History ==
In 1669, the eighth year of the reign of the Kangxi Emperor in the Qing dynasty (1644–1911), Tong Ren Tang was established in Beijing by Yue Xianyang who served as a senior physician at the Qing imperial court. In 1702, the company relocated from Beijing to the address from which it has operated ever since. In 1723, Tong Ren Tang was appointed the sole supplier of herbal medicines to the imperial court by the Yongzheng Emperor and remained in that position until the collapse of the Qing dynasty in 1911. In 1924, the company Tiger Bone Wine was awarded at the Leipzig Trade Fair, making the product the most popular type in commerce.

== Modern development ==
Like many older Chinese companies, Tong Ren Tang has struggled to adapt to market changes. In recent years, Tong Ren Tang has modernized its facilities, and changed its trade name to Tongrentang. It remains one of the oldest surviving brand names for traditional Chinese medicine, and has wide name recognition among Chinese and Asians worldwide. It is also one of the world's largest TCM companies, with products sold in countries all over the world.

Hutchison Whampoa Ltd. invested in Tong Ren Tang Technologies in 2000 by subscribing six million shares in the company. Page 17 of Prospectus Hutchison Whampoa Ltd., previously had two joint ventures with Tong Ren Tang. Page 6 of Prospectus

In October 2007, Tong Ren Tang and an American company called Greater China Corporation jointly announced the formation of a partnership under the name Tong Ren Tang Wellness Corporation to "develop spa-like wellness centers that will provide treatments and products based upon China's famous TongRenTang herbal medicines. These will include acupuncture, massage, acupressure, tuina, tai chi, qigong, reflexology, and many other oriental treatments as well as a full line of herbal foods and health products".

In 2020, the company began to expand into a chain coffee business, which turned part of the drugstore into a coffee shop, selling coffee and milk tea with herbs. This business is called "ZhiMa Health". The company aims to attract young consumers back to the traditional Chinese medicine market through Zhima Health. This service is only available in Beijing for the time being.

=== Intellectual property ===
Tong Ren Tang products are often counterfeited both inside and outside China. China's Ministry of Commerce notes that "Tong Ren Tang...and others have had their names and brands illegally registered by other Chinese and overseas manufacturers, resulting in a predicament in exports, multinational exchanges, and potential economic losses."
