= Hu Xueyan =

Chinese banker (1823–1885)

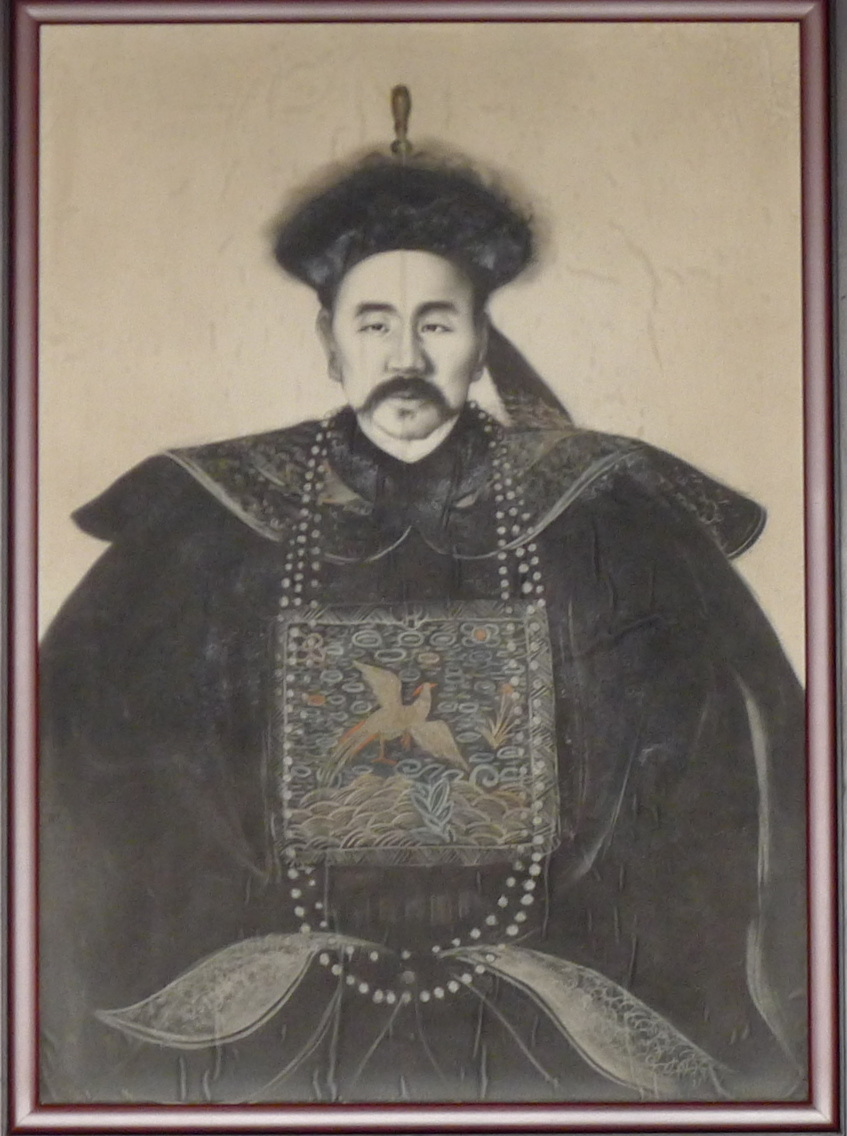
- Photograph of Hu Xueyan
- Traditional Chinese: 胡雪巖
- Simplified Chinese: 胡雪岩
Transcriptions
Standard Mandarin
- Hanyu Pinyin: Hú Xuěyán
- Wade–Giles: Hu Hsüeh-yan

Hu Guangyong
- Chinese: 胡光墉
Transcriptions
Standard Mandarin
- Hanyu Pinyin: Hú Guāngyōng
- Wade–Giles: Hu Kuang-yung

Hu Guangyong (29 September 1823 – 27 November 1885), better known by his courtesy name Xueyan, was a businessman in China during the latter Qing dynasty. He was active in banking, real estate, shipping and Chinese medicine. He was involved in the salt, tea, clothing, grain as well as the arms trade.

Hu was the only person of the merchant class in the Qing dynasty to be awarded a red-topped hat, a rank indicating an officer of second grade (二品; Èr pǐn) by the Qing imperial court. He was also one of the few people given express permission by Empress Dowager Cixi to ride a horse in the Forbidden City.

== Biography ==
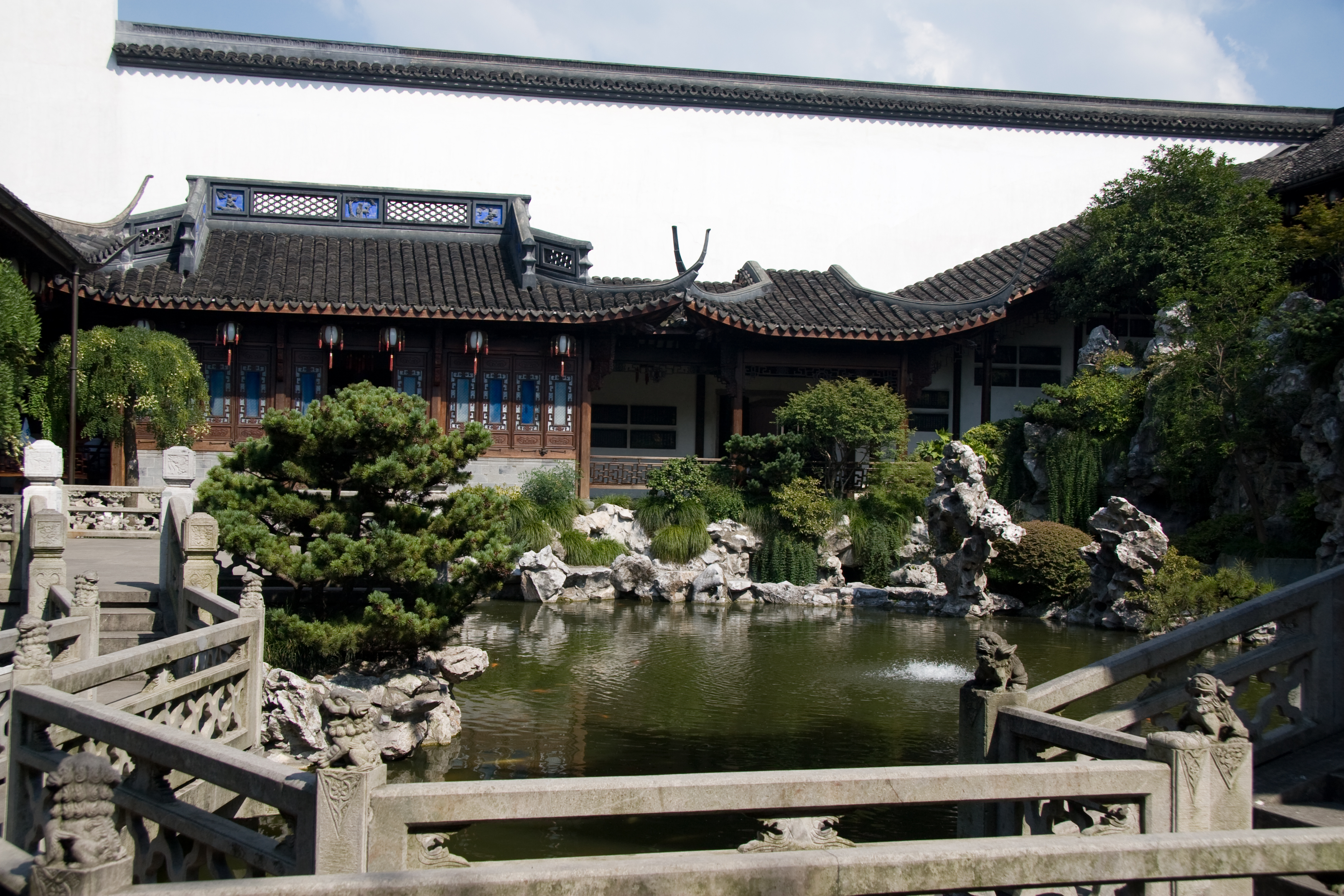
Hu's former residence in Hangzhou, Zhejiang.

Born on 29 September 1823 in Jixi County, Anhui Province, in 1837, the 13-year-old Hu moved to Hangzhou, Zhejiang, to be apprenticed to a private bank which would later become the foundation of his Fukang Bank (阜康錢莊). Through a series of events, at 26 years of age, he became friends with a local salt magnate, Wang Youling. He borrowed 500 taels of silver in bank drafts to help Wang run for office. This would cement Wang as Hu's political ally, a relationship that Hu would lean on during his rise to wealth.

Twelve years later, in 1860, Wang became the governor of Zhejiang. In gratitude for Hu's help early on his campaign, Wang campaigned hard to help Hu start more private banks. The following year, the Taiping Rebellion reached Hangzhou. Hu used his considerable influence to transport food and arms to the city. However, by the end of the year, Hangzhou fell due to the lack of food. Wang committed suicide, leaving Hu without an ally. At the age of 39, Hu eventually found an ally in Zuo Zongtang ("General Tso"), the new viceroy and Governor-General of Fujian and Zhejiang. He won Zuo's trust by paying for Zuo's army's rations and salaries. He later became General Zuo's financier in all his military efforts.

In 1866, he funded Foochow Arsenal, China's first modern shipyard and naval academy. After General Zuo accepted a position as Governor-General of Shaanxi and Gansu, Hu ran the naval academy in Zuo's stead. To aid in the movement of Zuo's troops and its military expedition against the Muslim rebels in Xinjiang and later the Russians during the Ili Crisis, Hu—at the time in charge of the Shanghai Transportation and Procurement Bureau—procured a credit line of 15,950,000 taels of silver (600,000 kg) from HSBC, HSBC's first public loan in China. As a result, Zuo was victorious, and Hu was awarded the red-topped hat by the Imperial Court for his efforts.

Along the way, Hu set up various other businesses, ranging from banks to pawnshops. After being recognised by the Qing government for his achievements, Hu also began to engage in more philanthropic activities. His best known contribution that still stands to this day is the medicinal hall Hu Qing Yu Tang. It was known then for its uncompromising quality in medicine, ethical treatment of patients and cheap healthcare. It was said that Hu himself personally exchanged a peasant's medicine after being complained to. It was his ethics that propelled his fame.

Later in life, Hu tried to corner the silk trade, leading to an international boycott directed by the French. In 1883, after being forced to sell silk, he began to experience cash flow problems. There were runs on his bank, and he finally filed for bankruptcy in 1884. Within a year, Hu died of depression at age 62.

Hu's former residence is now a tourist attraction in Hangzhou. It was opened to the public in 2001 after restoration.

== Accomplishments ==
Hu Xueyan is known in modern China for these accomplishments:

- Funded the modernization of the Chinese army
- Founded the pharmaceutical company Hu Qing Yu Tang
- Retrieved cultural relics from outside China (mostly Japan)
- Ethics of a businessman

== Popular culture ==
- Fragrance of Osmanthus of August (八月桂花香) - Taiwanese TV Movie
- Red Topped Hat Businessman (红顶商人) - 25 episode Chinese TV series

== See also ==
- Red hat merchant
- Former Residence of Hu Xueyan
- Self-Strengthening Movement

== Sources ==
- Esherick, Joseph W., ed. (2001). Remaking the Chinese City: Modernity and National Identity, 1900-1950. Hawaii UP. ISBN 978-0824825188.
- Huo, Jiazhen; Hong, Zhisheng (2013). Service Science in China. doi:10.1007/978-3-642-34497-8. ISBN 978-3642344961.
- Li, Lillian M. (1981). China's Silk Trade: Traditional Industry in the Modern World, 1842-1937. Harvard East Asian Monographs. Vol. Book 97. Harvard University Asia Center. ISBN 978-0674119628.
- Stanley, C. John (1961). Late Ch'ing finance: Hu Kuang-yung as an innovator. Chinese Economic and Political Studies. Vol. V. Cambridge, Mass.: East Asian Research Center, Harvard U. ISBN 978-0674511651.;
