= Traditional Chinese house architecture =

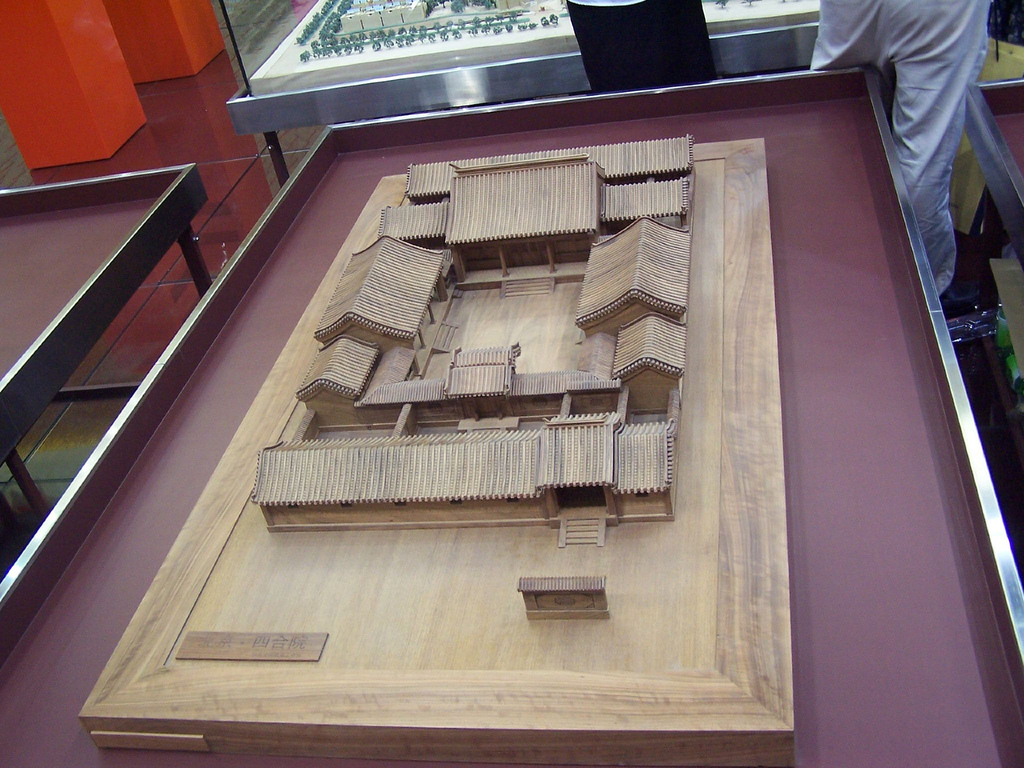
Model of a classic Chinese late imperial era home unit

Traditional Chinese house architecture refers to a historical series of architecture styles and design elements that were commonly utilized in the building of civilian homes during the imperial era of ancient China. Throughout this two-thousand-year-long period, significant innovations and variations of homes existed, but house design generally incorporated a set of qualities that made Chinese home architecture distinct from that of other cultures and regions. As highlighted by the classic siheyuan style, this included an emphasis on extended family units in a single dwelling, distinct separation of various elements of the household, alignment with the cardinal directions, and wooden construction; all in line with Confucian hierarchy and Feng Shui.

== History ==
Chinese home design was originally more heterogeneous than it is today. In addition to the orthodox square shape, evidence of round dwellings is common in early archaeological sites. Throughout several millennia, architecture was influenced by the development of Chinese thought, narrowing the range of acceptable layouts closer to the mature siheyuan style. As Han Chinese culture spread from the Yellow River Valley, dwellings in the outlying regions retained influence from the dwellings of the native cultures. For instance, Yue homes in southern China were traditionally built on wooden piles due to the humid climate. When Han migrants moved to the region, they initially adapted this style before the standard Han practice of raised earth foundations eventually re-asserted itself. After the form of the traditional Chinese household had settled, this basic layout changed very little, especially for commoner's dwellings.

== Layout commonalities ==
=== Organisation ===
By the later imperial period, the structure of homes in China had coalesced into a form that reinforced Neo-Confucian ideals that emphasized a firm separation between social roles and classes. This was especially true in the homes of the upper classes, which had the resources to delegate specific sections of the home to different sexes, age groups and occupations.

==== Directional structure ====
Alignment along a north-south axis was ubiquitous among Chinese homes, as dictated by the paradigms of order and harmony with nature. Home units were constructed facing south, with individual buildings following the alignment of the greater structure, with perfect symmetry. This resulted in the classic siheyuan structure, with identifiable "wings" each facing one of the four cardinal directions.

Extended family units generally assign different wings of the home to different branches of the family, with older and more respected family members taking more auspicious positions. This often included buildings in the sunnier, more private rear of the compound. The ancestral shrine of the family where the common ancestors of the inhabitants were honored was either located here or in the center of the property. Less important positions facing the east and west of the compounds were relegated to junior branches of the family, while more peripheral locations were relegated to servants and other less important activities.

Especially important buildings such as the ancestral/ceremonial hall were often marked with taller and more ornate roof structures, as opposed to the other homes and buildings within the compound. As these buildings were generally in the back of the home directly facing the entrance, this served to enhance the symmetrical beauty of the home's alignment.

== Construction ==
Traditional Chinese dwellings were overwhelmingly built out of wood, especially after the earlier dynastic period. Stone dwellings and those made from dirt were relatively uncommon even when such materials were common in the local area. As the centuries drew on, lumber became less and less common on the North China plain with bricks and stone becoming common construction materials for walls and public edifices. Despite this, the popularity of wood remained very high, with varying grades of timber being used by the upper class as a means of showing their wealth.

This focus on wooden construction has led to a relatively poor rate of survival, with very few homes remaining from before the Ming era, even fewer were homes belonging to commoners due to lower quality construction materials and lack of maintenance. Therefore, much more is known about upper-class historical dwellings.

== Regional variation ==
Due to differences in culture and climate, the standard shape and style of homes varies from region to region. Homes in southern China often had sloped roof structures owing to the increased frequency of rainfall, while the arid northern climate made flat roofs more practical. Courtyards were emphasized to maximize sunlight in the north, while they were generally not as important in the very sunny south. Additionally, homes were rarely built with more than one story in the northern plains, but quite common in the mountainous south where building space was less available.

Notable exceptions to the ubiquitous use of wood include the Yaodong, the traditional homes of Shanxi and Shaanxi provinces which were cut into soft loess rocks into mountainsides, Lingnan architecture, which is generally of green brick construction, and the Tulou, traditional Hakka walled villages in Fujian and Guangdong which were built largely out of brick and earth.

== See also ==
- Siheyuan
- Chinese architecture
- Feng shui
- Ancient Chinese wooden architecture
- Tulou
- Yaodong
- Lingnan architecture
