= Red hat merchant =

Civil servant and businessman

- Origin: Qing dynasty
- Representative figures: Hu Xueyan

Red hat merchant (Chinese: 紅頂商人; hong-ding shangren), alternatively translated as red-hat businessman, entrepreneur with red hat, refers to a government official who also appears as a businessman, combining the roles of civil servant and businessman, that is, "government businessman".

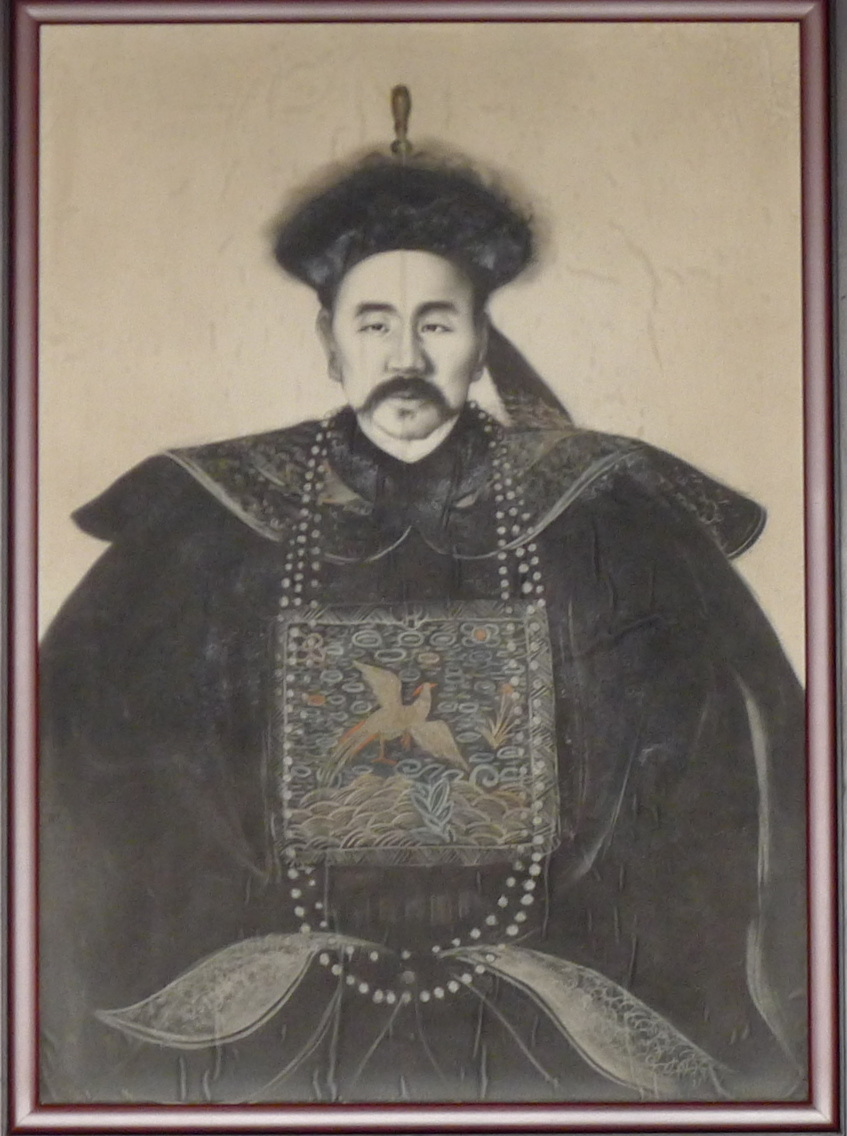
"Red hat merchant" Hu Xueyan

The term originated from the Qing dynasty and was initially used to describe state officials who were also engaged in commercial activities. At that time, wealthy officials often wore caps with rubies. The typical representative of the "red hat merchant" is Hu Xueyan, a prominent businessman in the late Qing dynasty.

Nowadays, the term "red hat merchant" is widely used to refer to a businessperson who benefits from good relationships with important high-level government officials. The term is also used to refer to businesspeople who hold top positions in local companies and local government financing vehicles. Through the strategy referred to by the slogan "wearing a red hat," some private entrepreneurs obtained permission from townships and villages to register their private enterprises as township and village enterprises in order to avoid and sidestep restrictions on the number of employees a small private business could have and comply.
