= Village-owned enterprise =

Type of Indonesian company

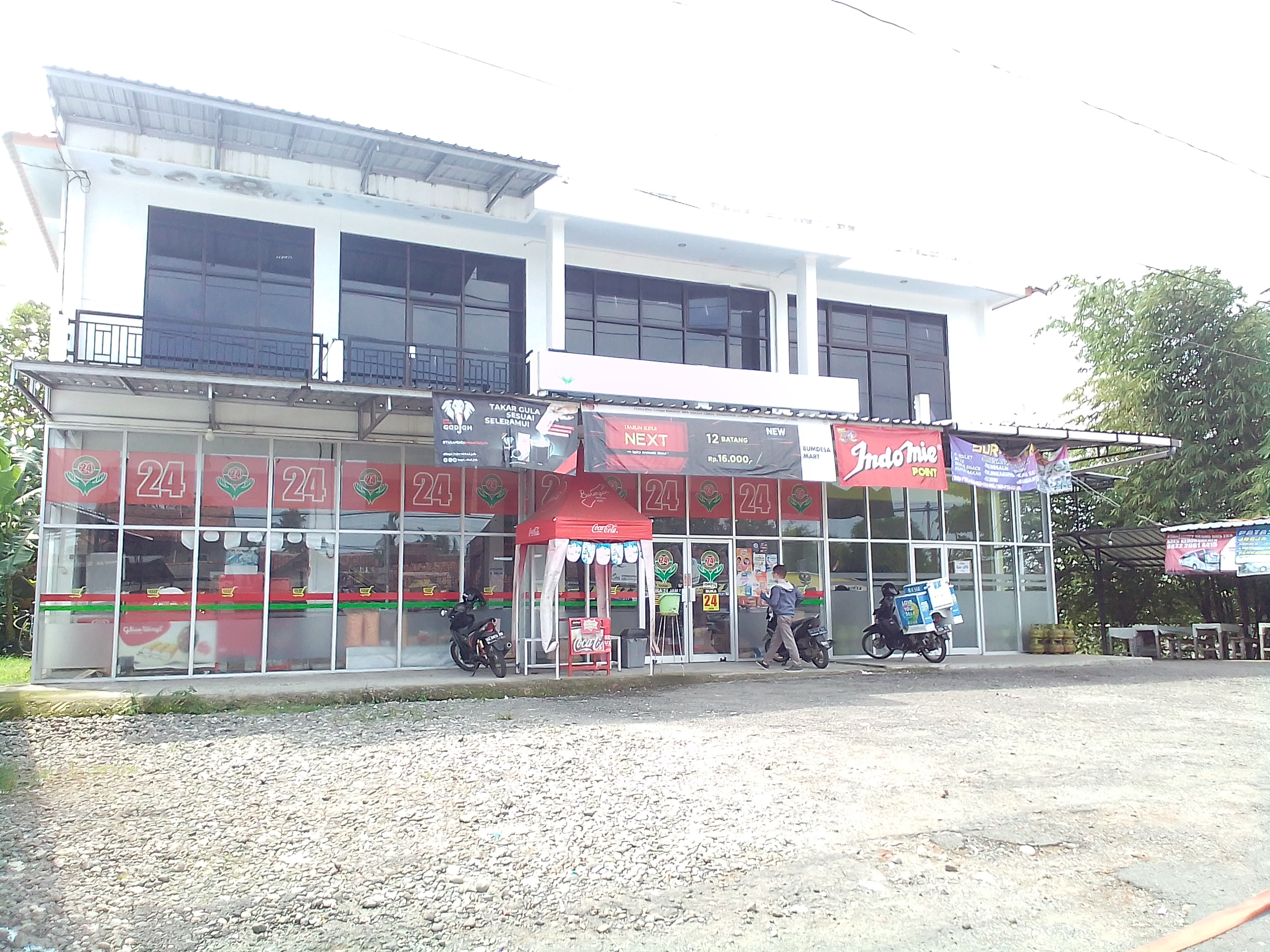
BUMDes-run convenience store in Kebumen Regency

A village-owned enterprise (Indonesian: Badan Usaha Milik Desa), often shortened to BUMDes or BUM Desa, is a type of company that is managed and established by an Indonesian village. These companies span a wide array of industries, from agriculture and mining to tourism and retail. BUMDes are a relatively recent development in Indonesia, first appearing in the aftermath of fall of Suharto and the rapid decentralization that followed. As of 2022, according to data from the Ministry of Villages, Development of Disadvantaged Regions, and Transmigration, there are total of 74,691 registered BUMDes. However, due to bureaucratic difficulties, only around 10 percent (7,902) are certified as legal entities as of 2022.

== History and definition ==
The first legal basis for villages being allowed to manage their own enterprises was Law Number 22 of 1999 on Regional Government, with chapter 108 stating that "villages may own enterprises in accordance with the law". This was later revised; in Law Number 32 of 2004, chapter 213, section 1, reads: "A village can establish an enterprise owned by the village in accordance of its needs and potential". The existence of village-owned enterprises was made clear with Government Law Number 72 of 2005, chapter 78, section 1, which specifically mentions Badan Usaha Milik Desa or BUMDes; Law Number 6 of 2014 on villages; Ministry of Home Affairs Regulation Number 39 of 2010 on the definition of a BUMDes; and Government Law Number 39 of 2021 on BUMDes.

In Law Number 6 of 2014, BUMDes are mentioned several times in detail. The law specifically defines a BUMDes as an "enterprise whose capital is wholly or partly owned by the village government, derived from the wealth of the village, which is separated through asset management, services, and other business for the welfare of the village's inhabitants". Details about structures, establishment, and management of BUMDes are explained in chapters 87 through 90. In chapter 88, it is stated that BUMDes are established through village consultation and village regulation (Peraturan Desa). The establishment of BUMDes is a way for village governments to innovate in rural development.

== Sectors ==
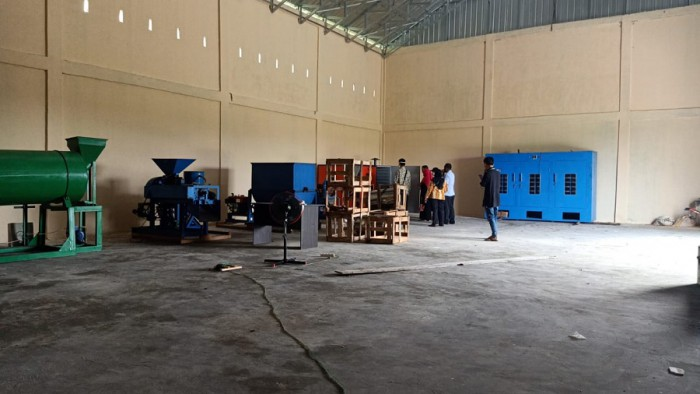
BUMDes-run fish pellet factory in West Kotawaringin Regency. BUMDes are present in many sectors.

Village-owned enterprises have been established in a wide variety of sectors, ranging from mining and plantation to retail, tourism, and telecommunication. However, Ministry of Villages, Development of Disadvantaged Regions, and Transmigration specifically stated that BUMDes are designed to focus on three key sectors on rural Indonesia, namely fishery, agriculture, and tourism.

== Effects ==
According to data from 2021, there are 45,223 active BUMDes, which in total employed more than 20 million people and contributed to around 4.6 trillion Rupiah to the Indonesian economy that year. The same year, around 35 percent of the existing BUMDes were severely affected by the COVID-19 pandemic, which resulted in mass layoffs of more than 100,000 people.

== Challenges ==
Critics have argued that BUMDes are ineffective as business entities. Challenges for BUMDes include bureaucratic difficulties in obtaining legal entity status for newly established BUMDes, lack of enthusiasm by village governments to develop BUMDes business, and relatively limited sectors that can be capitalized in rural regions. BUMDes are often unprofitable, lacking necessary capital or resources to develop their business. They often have unstable internal structures because they are managed by villagers and village officials who tend to lack education in accounting and finance. These problems result in poor or weak implementation of BUMDes in some regions. Legal certainty is also a problem for many BUMDes, as it hampers their ability to look for investors or to open bank accounts. Despite efforts to ease the bureaucratic challenge faced by villages to establish their BUMDes as a legal entity, only 7,902 BUMDes, or around 10 percent, have been successfully registered as a legal entity as of 2022.

== See also ==
- Township and Village Enterprises
