= West Lake Museum =

Museum in Hangzhou, China

- Chinese: 西湖博物馆
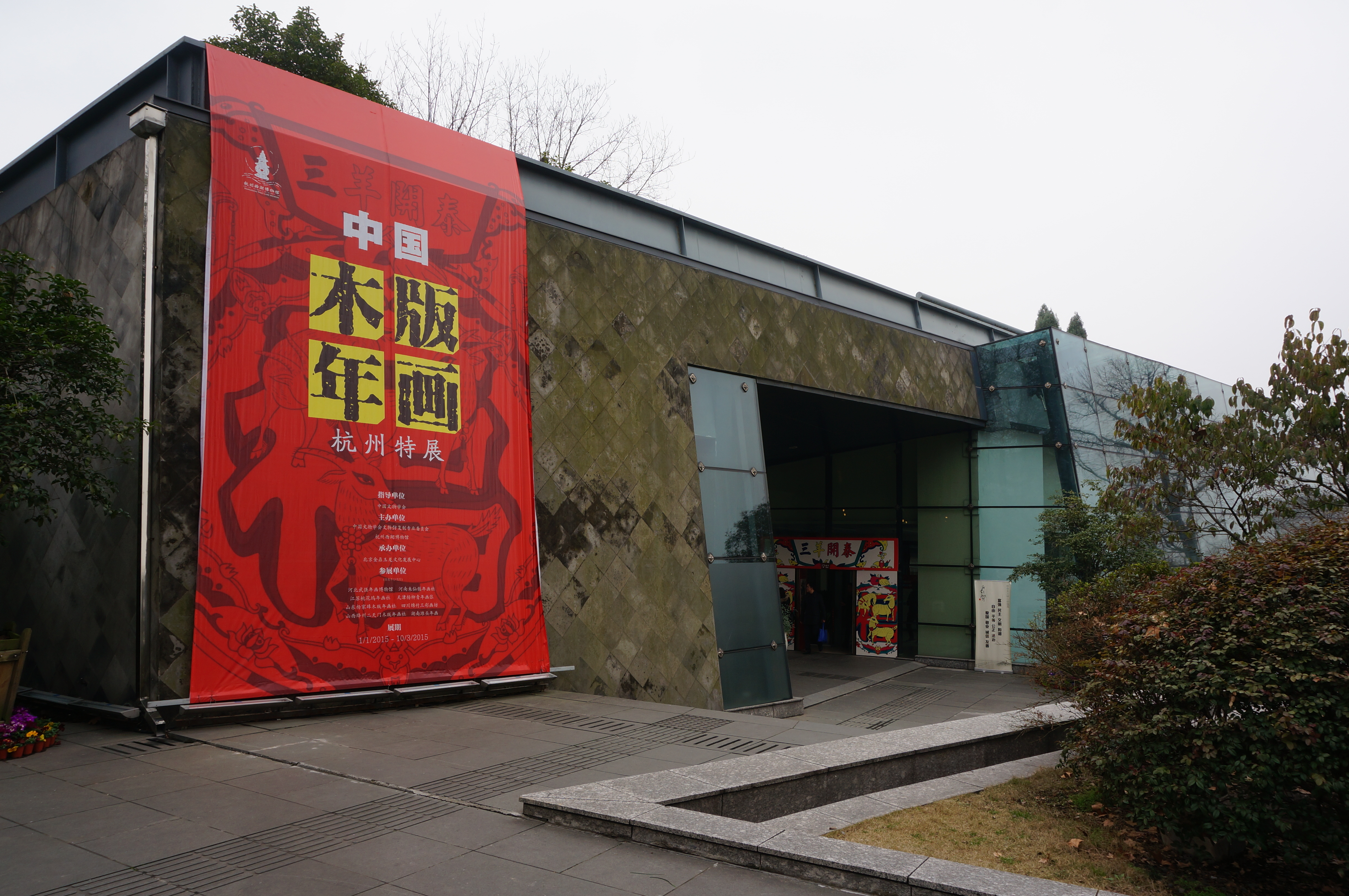
- West Lake Museum in 2015

- Location within Zhejiang Location within China
- Established: October 2005; 21 years ago
- Coordinates: 30°14′N 120°10′E

The West Lake Museum (Chinese: 西湖博物馆) is a museum in Hangzhou, China concerning aspects of the West Lake. There are four main exhibition areas in the hall introducing the amongst others the landscape, humanity and historical influence of the West Lake.

== Exhibition area ==
The museum covers an area of 20144 square meters with its principal part being 7920 square meters. Three-fourths of the structure is underground and the structure area above ground is only 1980 square meters. A large area of the museum uses the steel frame glass structure which is good to gather light.

In the museum, the exhibition hall covers an area of 2875 square meters and the exhibition length is up to 310 meters. There are altogether 516 pictures and 389 items on display.

The West Lake Museum was open to the public in October, 2005. Now, it is free for everyone to visit it.
