= Hangzhou =

Capital of Zhejiang Province, China

Hangzhou 杭州市 Hangchow
- Prefecture-level and sub-provincial city
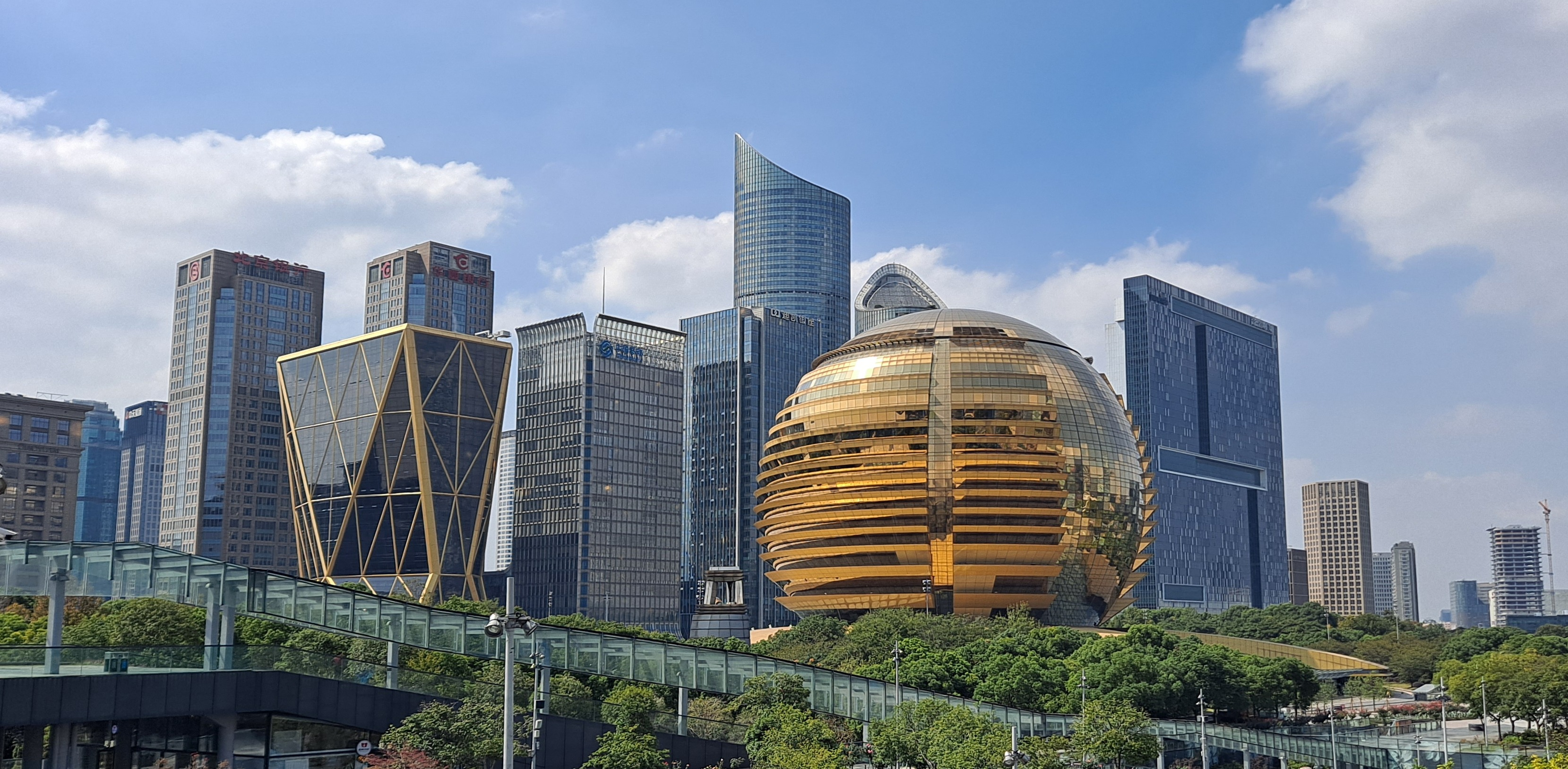
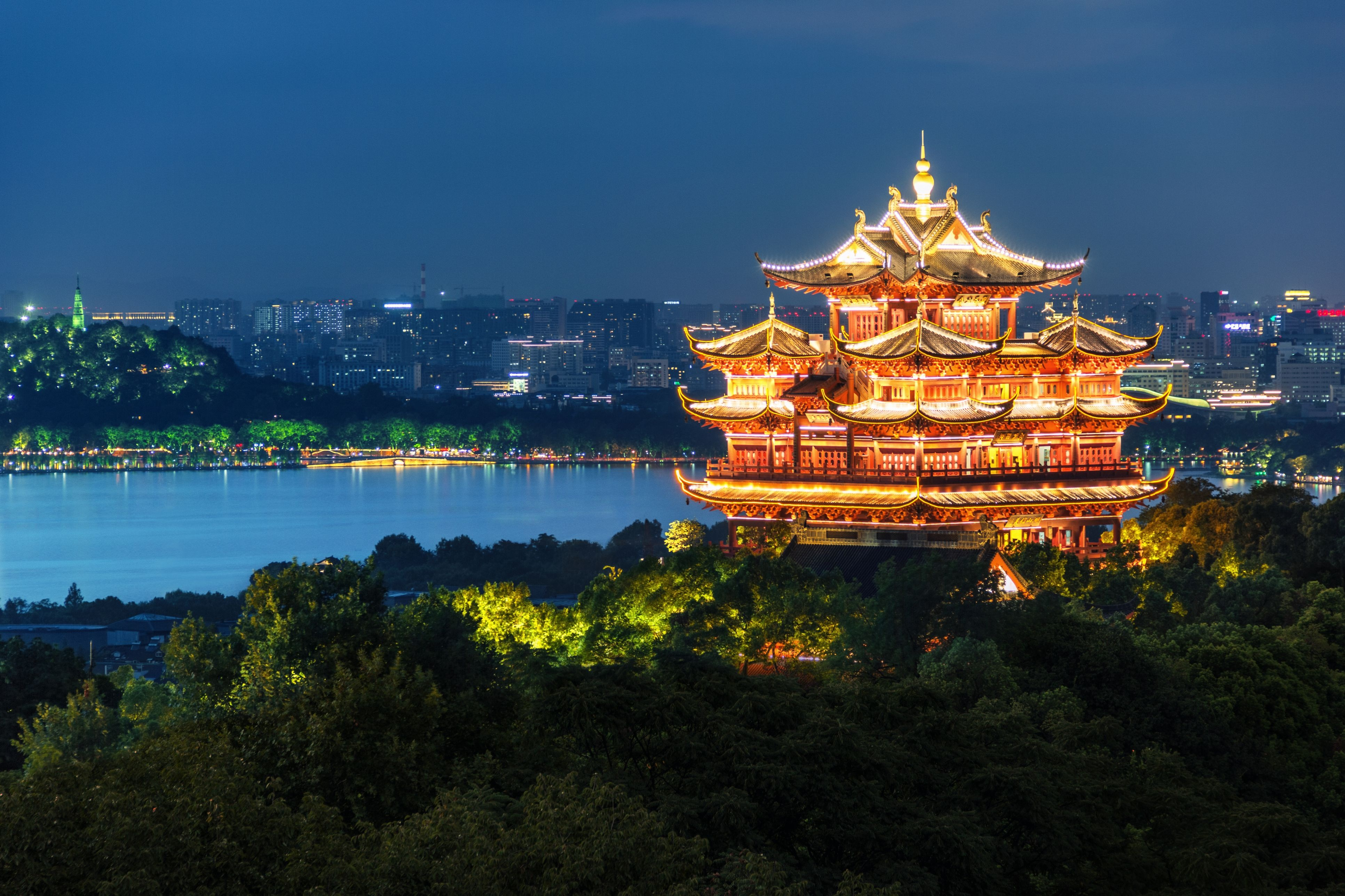
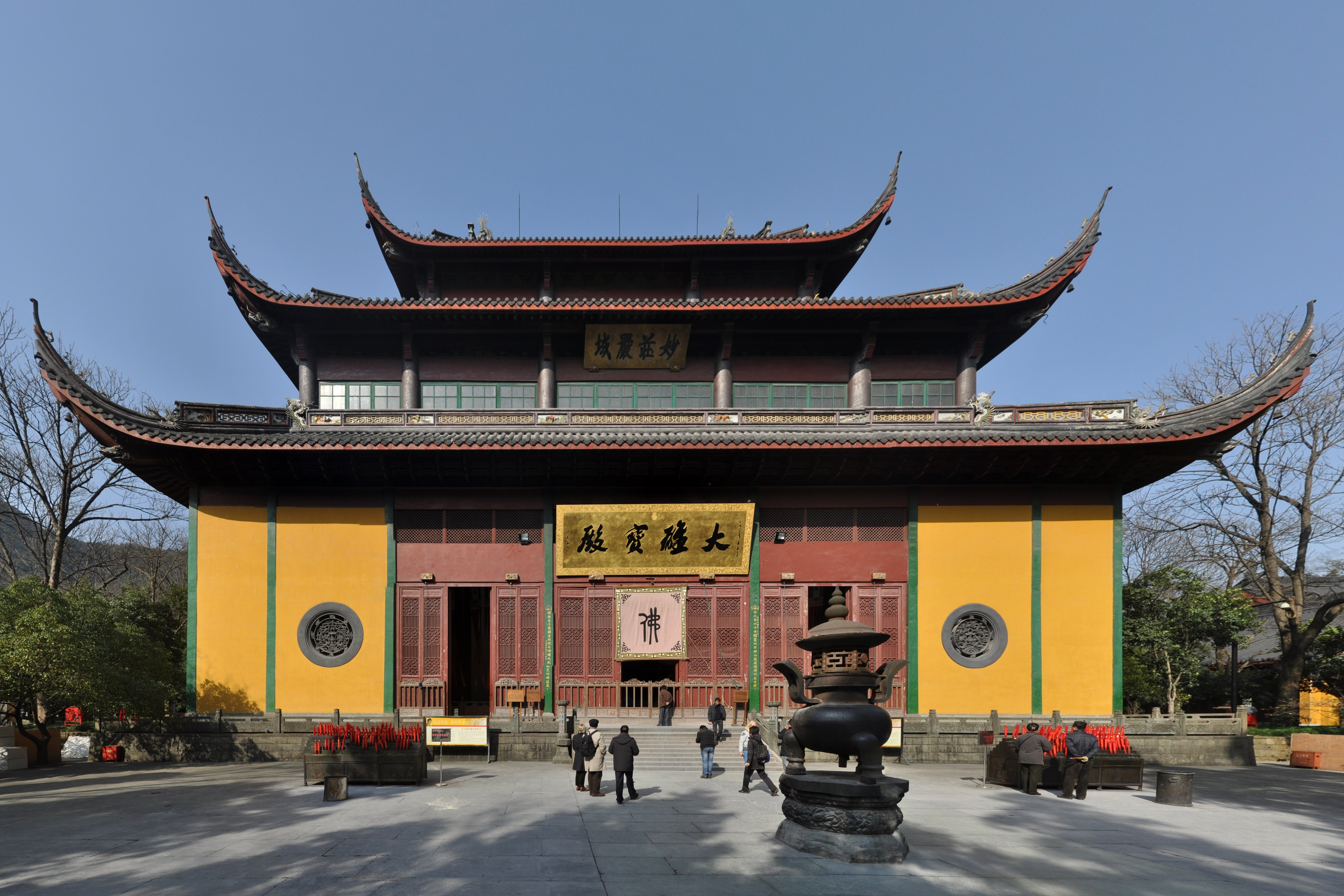
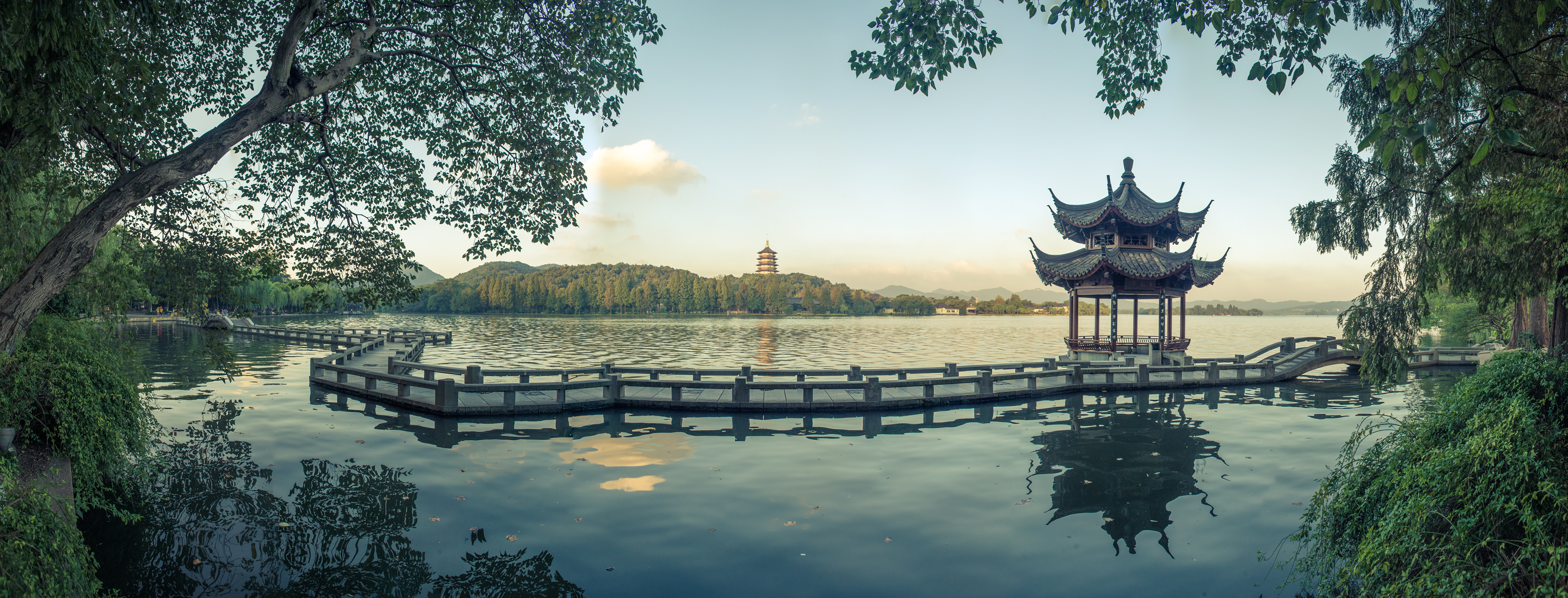
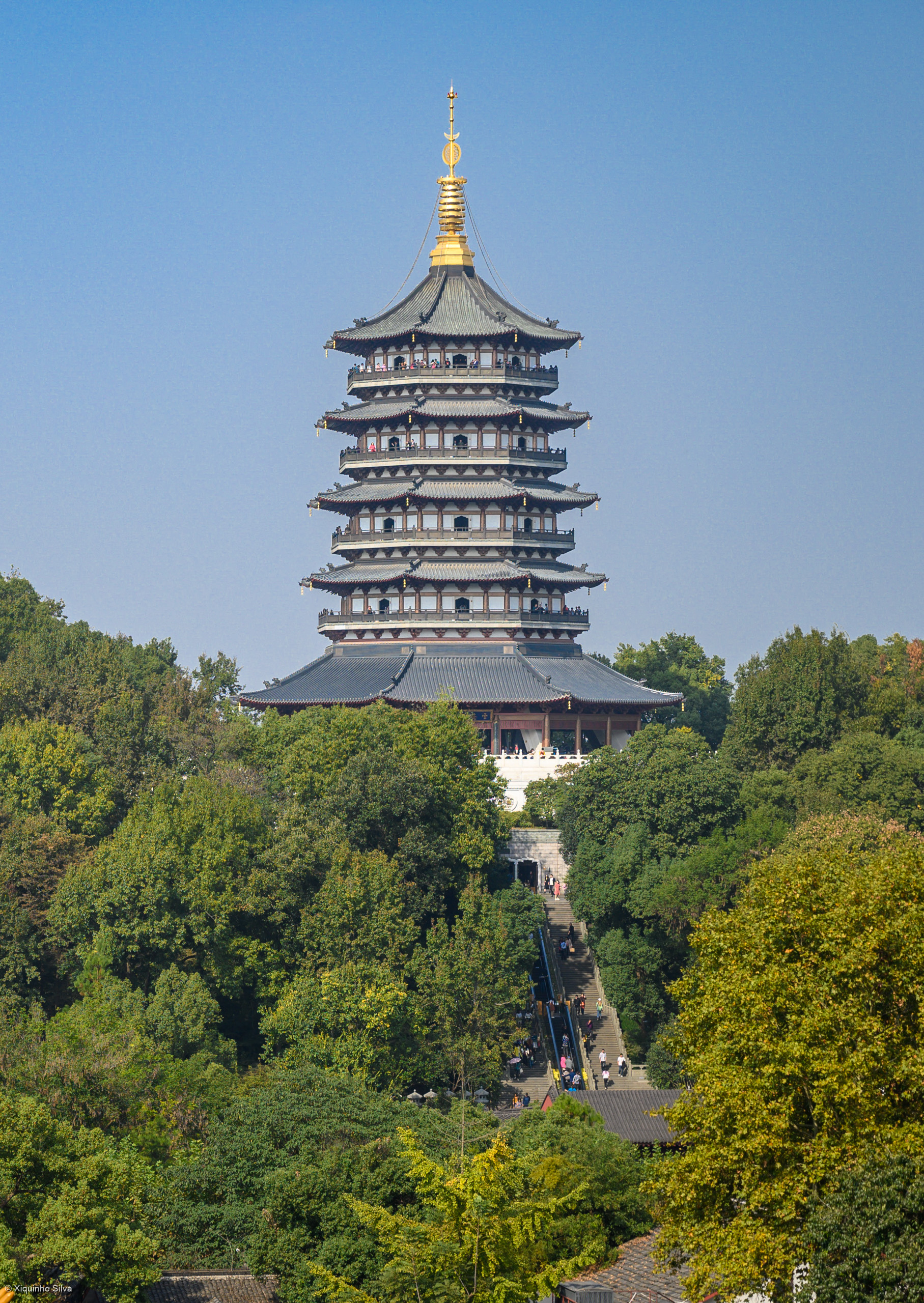
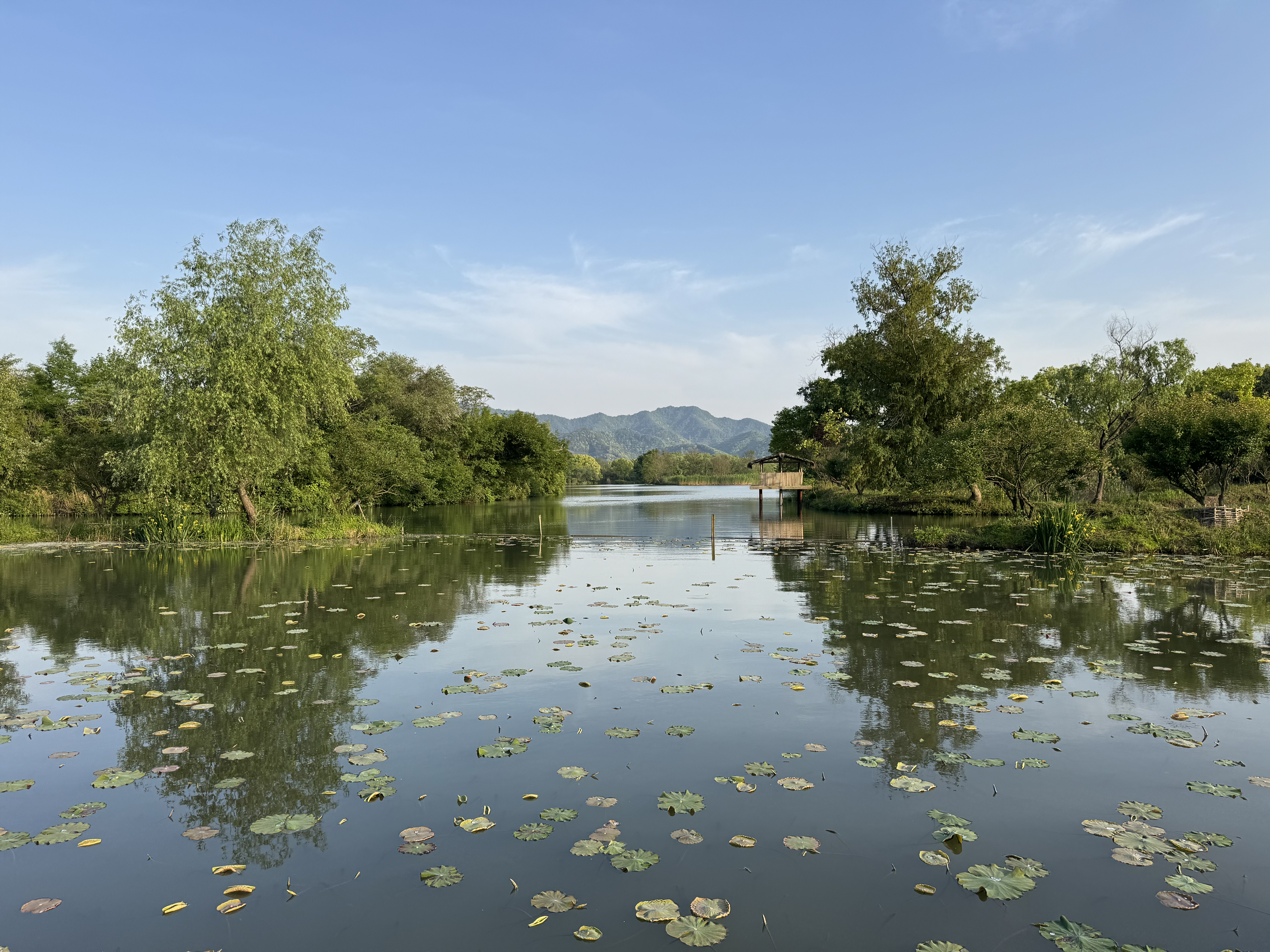
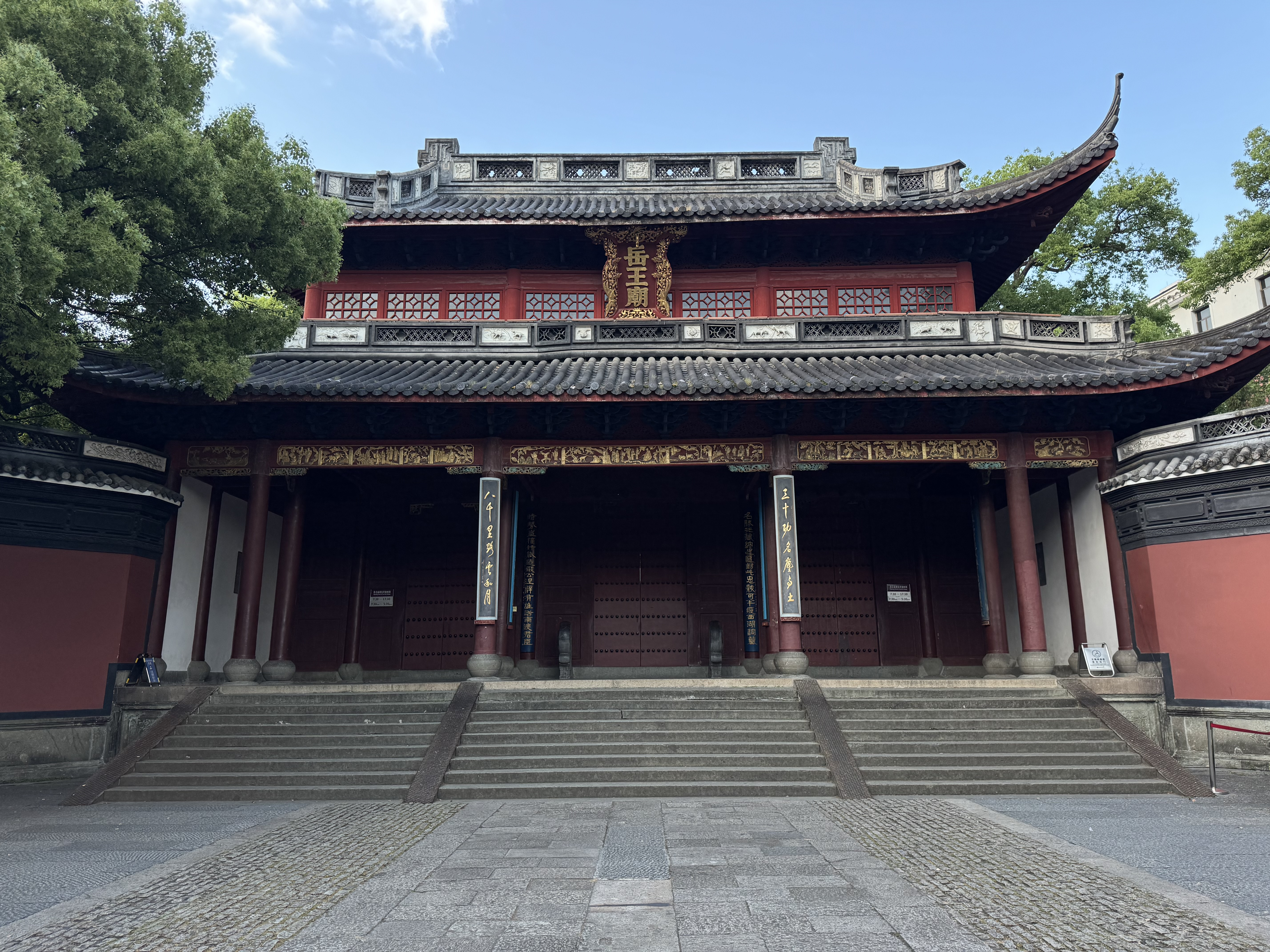
- Hangzhou CBD skyline Chenghuang Pavilion Lingyin Temple West Lake Leifeng Pagoda Xixi National Wetland Park Yue Fei Temple

- Logo

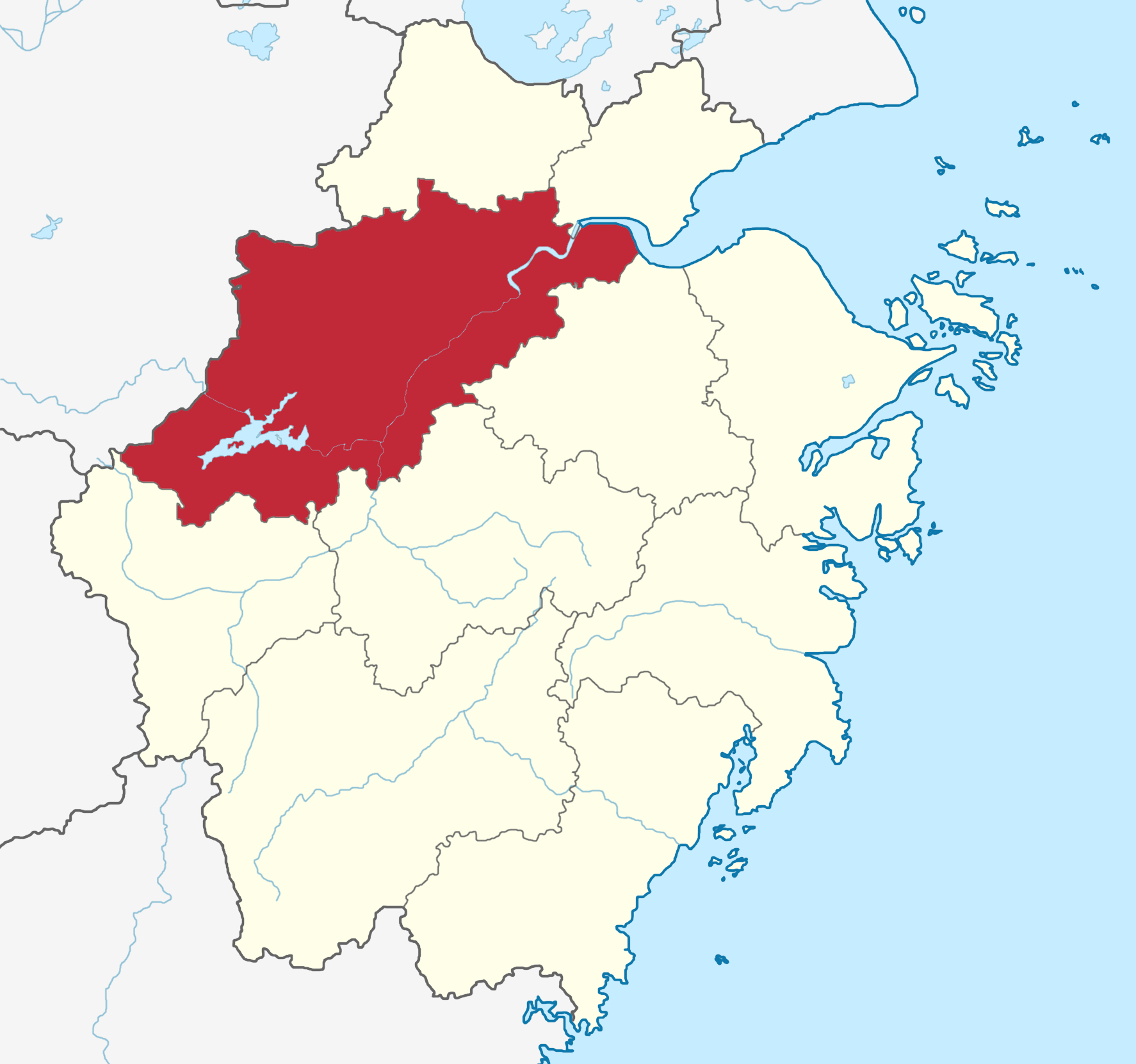
- Location of Hangzhou City jurisdiction in Zhejiang
- Interactive map of Hangzhou
- Location of the city center in Zhejiang Location of the city center in China
- Coordinates (Zhejiang Municipal People's Government): 30°16′01″N 120°09′11″E
- Country: China
- Province: Zhejiang
- Municipal seat: Shangcheng District

Government
  - Type: Sub-provincial city
  - Body: Hangzhou Municipal People's Congress
  - Party Secretary: Liu Fei
  - Congress Chairman: Ji Junmin
  - Mayor: Du Xuliang
  - CPPCC Chairman: Wang Wenxu

Area
  - City: 16,821.1 km^{2} (6,494.7 sq mi)
  - Urban: 8,259.9 km^{2} (3,189.2 sq mi)
  - Metro: 8,107.9 km^{2} (3,130.5 sq mi)

Population (2020 census)
  - City: 11,936,010
  - Density: 709.586/km^{2} (1,837.82/sq mi)
  - Urban: 10,711,238
  - Urban density: 1,296.8/km^{2} (3,358.6/sq mi)
  - Metro: 13,035,329
  - Metro density: 1,607.7/km^{2} (4,164.0/sq mi)
  - National rank: 5th
- Demonym(s): Hangzhounese (杭州人, Hángzhōurén)

GDP(2025)
  - City: CN¥ 2.3 trillion US$ 330.45 billion
  - Per capita: CN¥ 192,694; US$ 27,685
- Time zone: UTC+8 (China Standard)
- Postal code: 310000
- ISO 3166 code: CN-ZJ-01
- Licence plate prefixes: 浙A, 浙M
- Regional variety: Wu: Hangzhou dialect
- Website: Hangzhou.gov.cn
- City tree Camphor laurel (Cinnamomum camphora); City flower Sweet Osmanthus (Osmanthus fragrans)

Hangzhou
- "Hangzhou" in Chinese characters
- Chinese: 杭州
- Postal: Hangchow
- Literal meaning: "Hang Prefecture"
Transcriptions
Standard Mandarin
- Hanyu Pinyin: Hángzhōu
- Gwoyeu Romatzyh: Harngjou
- Wade–Giles: Hang^{2}-chou^{1}
- IPA: [xǎŋ.ʈʂóʊ]
Yue: Cantonese
- Jyutping: hong^{4} zau^{1}
- IPA: [hɔŋ˩.tsɐw˥]
Southern Min
- Hokkien POJ: Hâng-chiu

Qiantang
- Simplified Chinese: 钱塘
- Traditional Chinese: 錢塘
- Wu: ^{2}jien-dan_{2} (Hangzhounese)
Transcriptions
Standard Mandarin
- Hanyu Pinyin: Qiántáng
- Gwoyeu Romatzyh: Chyantarng
- Wade–Giles: Chʻien^{2}-tʻang^{2}
- IPA: [tɕʰjɛ̌n.tʰǎŋ]
Wu
- Romanization: ^{2}jien-dan_{2} (Hangzhounese)
Yue: Cantonese
- Jyutping: cin4 tong4

Hangzhou (Note: /hɑːŋˈdʒoʊ/ hahng-JOH or /hæŋˈdʒoʊ/ hang-JOH; Chinese: 杭州, Wu Chinese pronunciation: [ɦɑ̃.tse], Standard Mandarin pronunciation: [xǎŋ.ʈʂóʊ]; formerly romanized as Hangchow) is the capital and most populous city of Zhejiang province, China, situated at the intersection of the southern terminus of the Grand Canal and the head of Hangzhou Bay. Renowned as one of the Eight Ancient Capitals of China, Hangzhou is celebrated for its cultural heritage and its West Lake.

Established as a county seat in 221 BC, Hangzhou later served as the capital of the Wuyue Kingdom (923–997) and the Southern Song dynasty (1138–1276). The city has three UNESCO World Heritage Sites: the West Lake Cultural Landscape, the Grand Canal, and the Archaeological Ruins of Liangzhu City.

Hangzhou is designated as a sub-provincial city and is part of the Yangtze River Delta. Hangzhou ranked ninth in GDP among mainland Chinese cities and 14th internationally according to the Global Innovation Index. The city hosts the headquarters of Alibaba Group, Ant Group, DeepSeek, Geely, and NetEase. According to the Nature Index, it ranks 10th globally in scientific research output.

== History ==
=== Early history ===
The celebrated neolithic culture of Hemudu is known to have inhabited Yuyao, 100 km (62 mi) south-east of Hangzhou as far back as seven thousand years ago. It was during this time that rice was first cultivated in southeast China. Excavations have established that the jade-carving Liangzhu culture (named for its type site just northwest of Hangzhou) inhabited the area immediately around the present city around five thousand years ago. The first of Hangzhou's present neighborhoods to appear in written records was Yuhang, which probably preserves an old Baiyue name.

In 222 BC, the First Emperor of the Qin established Qiantang (錢唐) as a county under the direction of Kuaiji Commandery (now Shaoxing). It was located in the area of the Wulin Mountains and the Wulin Lakes. Under the Han, the same area was known as Wulin (武林).

Hangzhou was made the seat of the prefecture of Hang under the Sui in AD 589, entitling it to a city wall which was constructed two years later. By a longstanding convention also seen in other cities like Guangzhou and Fuzhou, the city took on the name of the area it administered and became known as Hangzhou. Hangzhou was at the southern end of China's Grand Canal which extends to Beijing. The canal evolved over centuries but reached its full length by 609.

=== Tang dynasty ===
In the Tang dynasty, Bai Juyi, a renowned poet, was appointed governor of Hangzhou. He noticed that the farmland nearby depended on the water of West Lake, but due to negligence the old dyke had collapsed, and the lake so dried out that the local farmers were suffering from severe drought. He ordered the construction of a stronger and taller dyke, with a dam to control the flow of water, mitigating the drought problem. The livelihood of local people of Hangzhou improved over the following years. Bai Juyi used his leisure time to enjoy the West Lake, visiting it almost daily. He then had willows and other trees planted along the dyke, making it a landmark.

It is listed as one of the Seven Ancient Capitals of China. It was first the capital of the Wuyue Kingdom from 907 to 978 during the Five Dynasties and Ten Kingdoms period. Named Xifu (西府) at the time, it was one of the three great bastions of culture in southern China during the tenth century, along with Nanjing and Chengdu. Leaders of Wuyue were noted patrons of the arts, particularly of Buddhist temple architecture and artwork. The dyke built to protect the city by King Qian Liu gave the Qiantang its modern name. Hangzhou also became a cosmopolitan center, drawing scholars from throughout China and conducting diplomacy with neighboring Chinese states, and also with Japan, Goryeo, and the Khitan Liao dynasty.

=== Song dynasty ===
In 1089, another renowned poet governor Su Shi (Su Dongpo) used 200,000 workers to construct a 2.8 km (1.7 mi) long causeway across West Lake made of mud dredged from the lake bottom. The lake is surrounded by hills on the northern and western sides. The Baochu Pagoda sits on the Baoshi Hill to the north of the lake.

Hangzhou was chosen as the new capital of the Southern Song dynasty in 1132, when most of northern China had been conquered by the Jurchens in the Jin–Song wars. The surviving imperial family had retreated south from its original capital in Kaifeng after it was captured by the Jurchens in the Jingkang Incident of 1127. Emperor Gaozong moved to Nanjing, then to modern Shangqiu, then to Yangzhou in 1128, and finally to Hangzhou in 1129.

Once the prospect of retaking northern China had diminished, buildings in Hangzhou were extended and renovated to become a permanent imperial capital. The imperial palace in Hangzhou, modest in size, was expanded in 1133 with new roofed alleyways, and in 1148 with an extension of the palace walls. The city walls were built with tamped earth and stone and was 30 feet high and 10 feet thick at its base. There were 13 gates and several towers on the walls. The walls covered the city by four miles north to south and only one mile east to west. Arab merchants lived in Hangzhou during the Song dynasty, due to the fact that the oceangoing trade passages took precedence over land trade during this time. The Phoenix Mosque was constructed by a Persian settler in Hangzhou at this time.

From 1132 until the Mongol invasion of 1276, Hangzhou remained the capital of the Southern Song dynasty and was known as Lin'an (臨安). It served as the seat of the imperial government, a center of trade and entertainment, and the nexus of the main branches of the civil service. During that time the city was a gravitational center of Chinese civilization as what used to be considered "central China" in the north was taken by the Jin, an ethnic minority dynasty ruled by Jurchens.

Numerous philosophers, politicians, and men of literature, including some of the most celebrated poets in Chinese history such as Su Shi, Lu You, and Xin Qiji came here to live and die. Hangzhou is also the birthplace and final resting place of the scientist Shen Kuo (1031–1095 AD), his tomb being located in the Yuhang district.

During the Southern Song dynasty, commercial expansion, an influx of refugees from the conquered north, and the growth of the official and military establishments, led to a corresponding population increase and the city developed well outside its 9th-century ramparts. According to the Encyclopædia Britannica, Hangzhou had a population of over 2 million at that time, while historian Jacques Gernet has estimated that the population of Hangzhou numbered well over one million by 1276. (Official Chinese census figures from the year 1270 listed some 186,330 families in residence and probably failed to count non-residents and soldiers.) It is believed that Hangzhou was the largest city in the world from 1180 to 1315 and from 1348 to 1358.

Because of the large population and densely crowded (often multi-story) wooden buildings, Hangzhou was particularly vulnerable to fires. Major conflagrations destroyed large sections of the city in 1208, 1229, 1237, and 1275. The 1237 fire alone destroyed 30,000 dwellings. However, the worst was the 1208 fire which burned for 4 days in a 3-mile diameter and burnt 58,097 houses as well as killing 59 people. To combat this threat, the city constructed storage buildings that were rented out to merchants where watchmen patrolled by night and was enclosed by water on all sides. Besides this, the government established an elaborate system for fighting fires, erected watchtowers, devised a system of lantern and flag signals to identify the source of the flames and direct the response, and charged more than 3,000 soldiers with the task of putting out fire.

=== Yuan dynasty ===
Hangzhou was besieged and captured by the advancing Mongol armies of Kublai Khan in 1276, three years before the final collapse of the Southern Song. Historian Patricia Buckley Ebrey noted that the Mongol Yuan dynasty killed the Jurchen Wanyan royal family by the hundreds in the Siege of Kaifeng (1232), while sparing the city of Hangzhou including the Chinese Zhao royal family of the Southern Song. The Mongols rehired Southern Song government officials and had Han Chinese artisans in Shangdu marry the palace women. The capital of the new Yuan dynasty was established in the city of Dadu (Beijing), but Hangzhou remained an important commercial and administrative center for their southern territory.

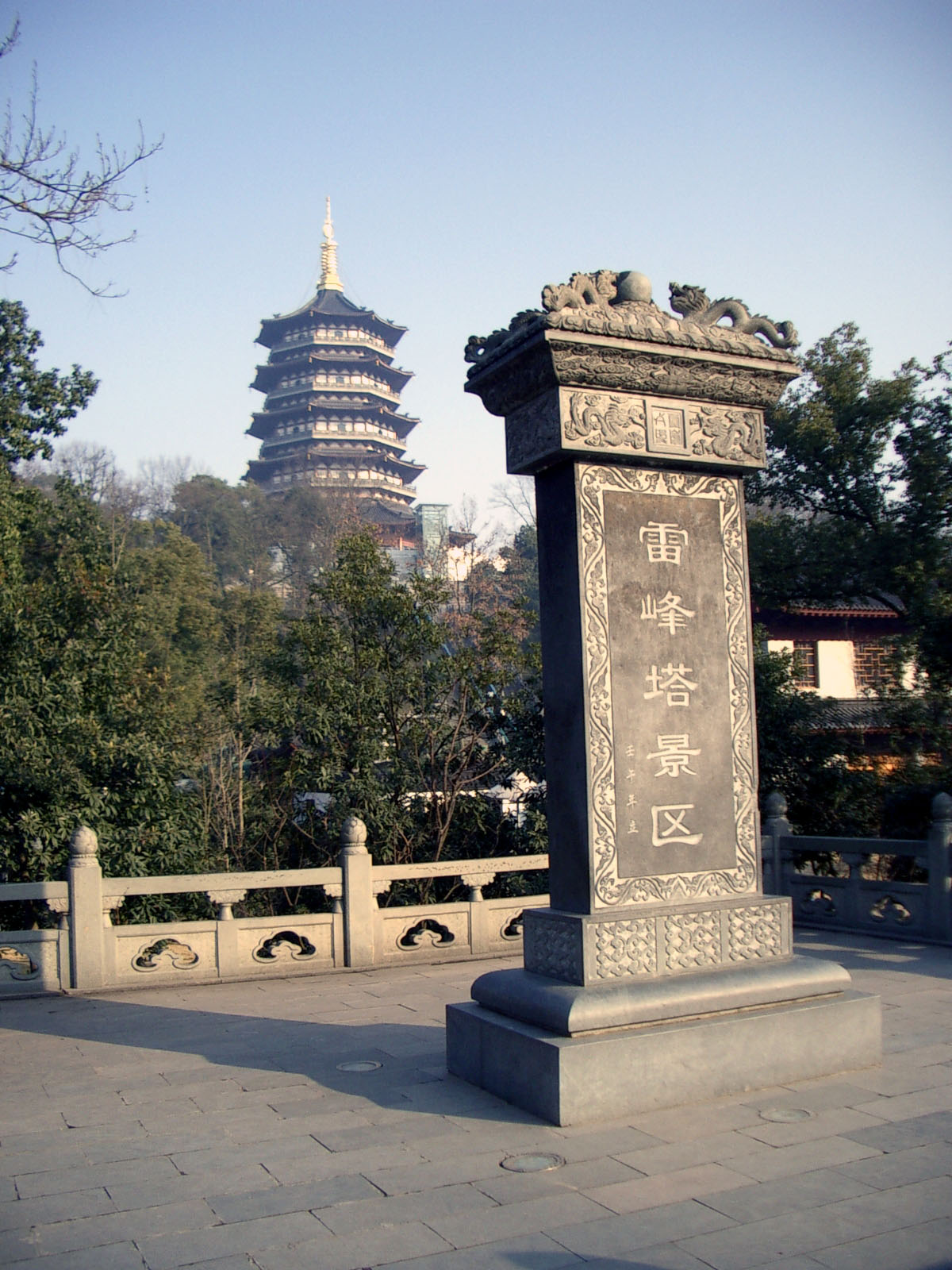
Leifeng Pagoda

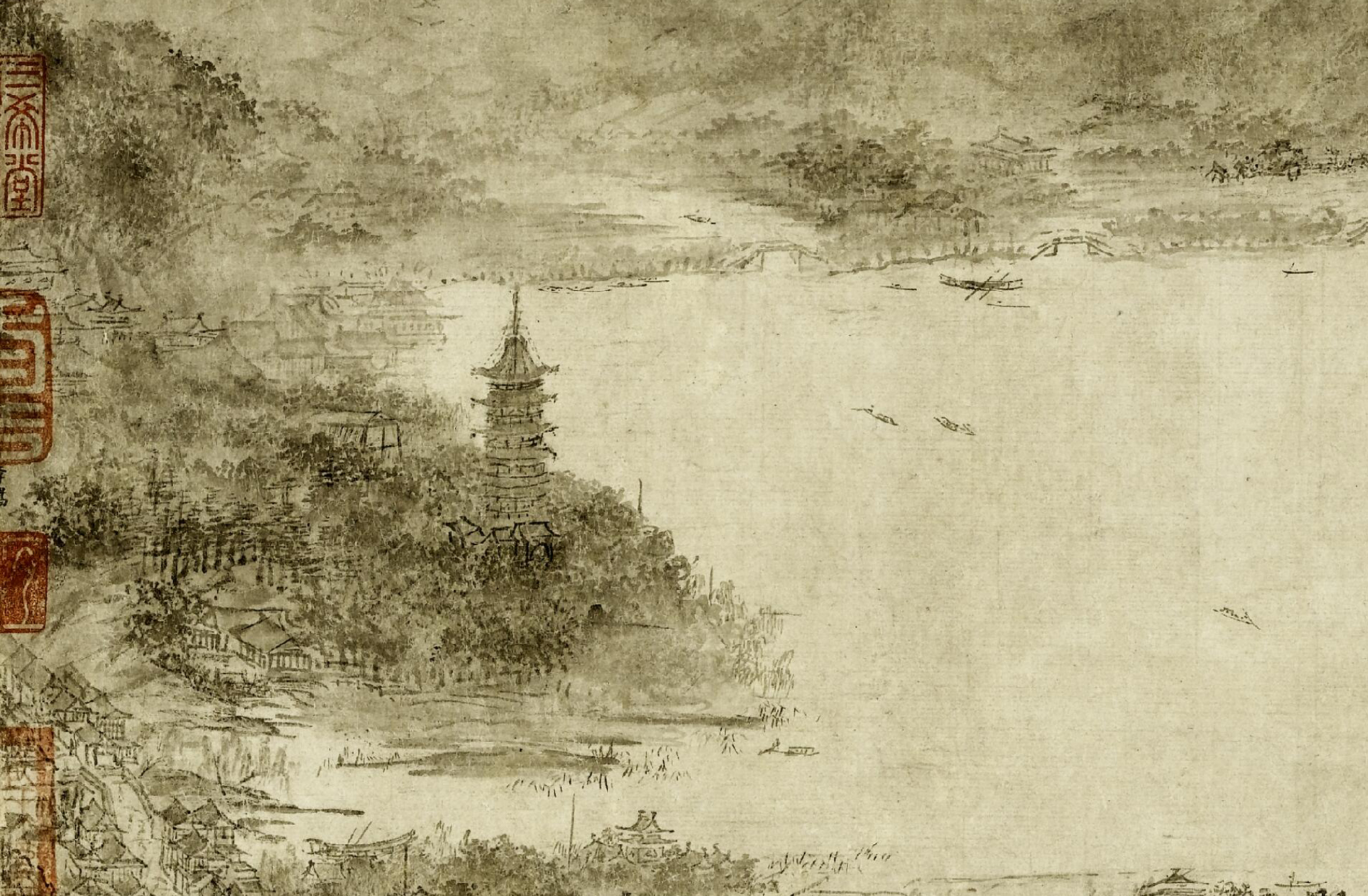
Xi Hu Landscape by Li Song (1190–1264), showing the Leifeng Pagoda in the Southern Song Dynasty

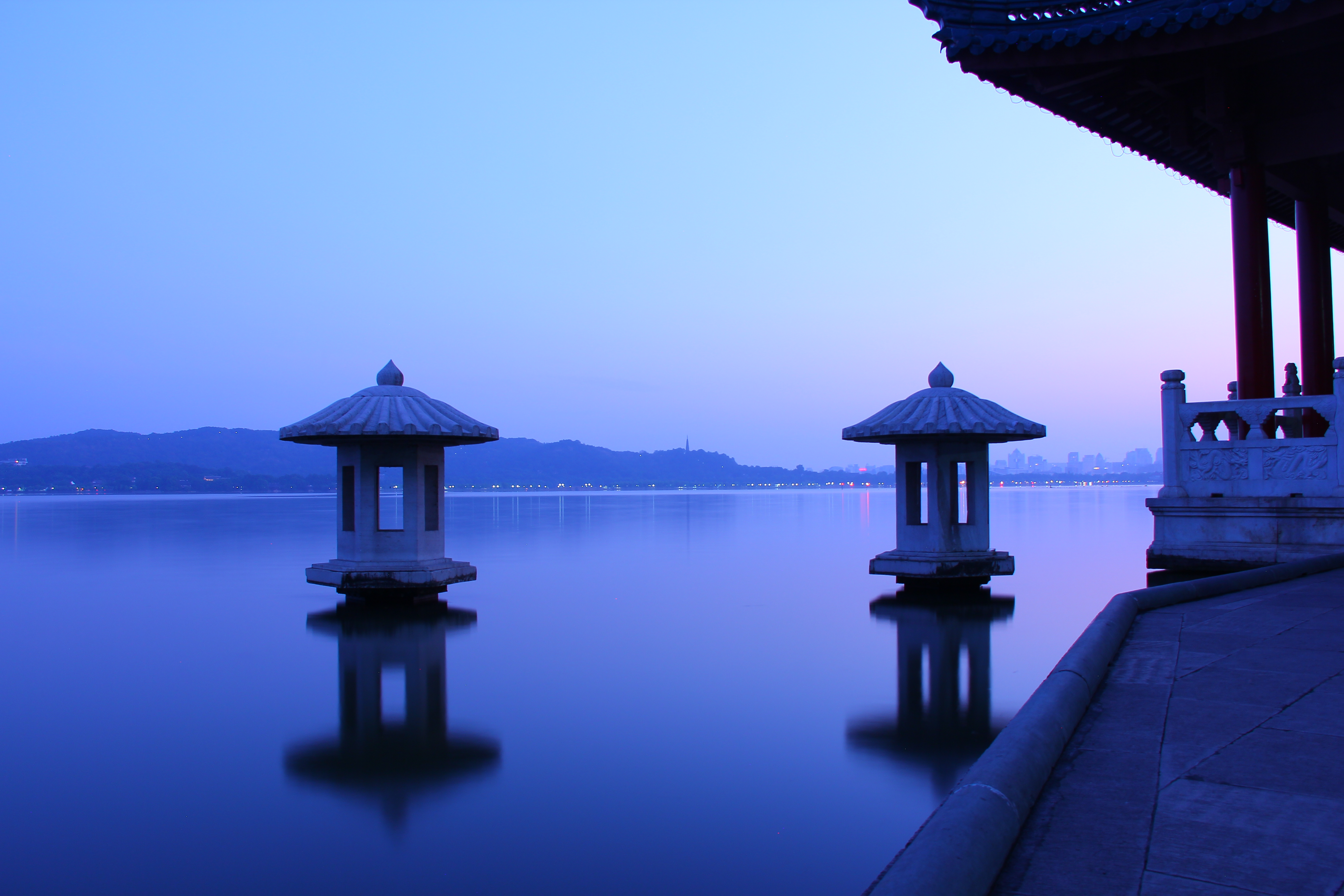
"Moon over the Peaceful Lake in Autumn", one of the Ten Scenes of the Xi Hu

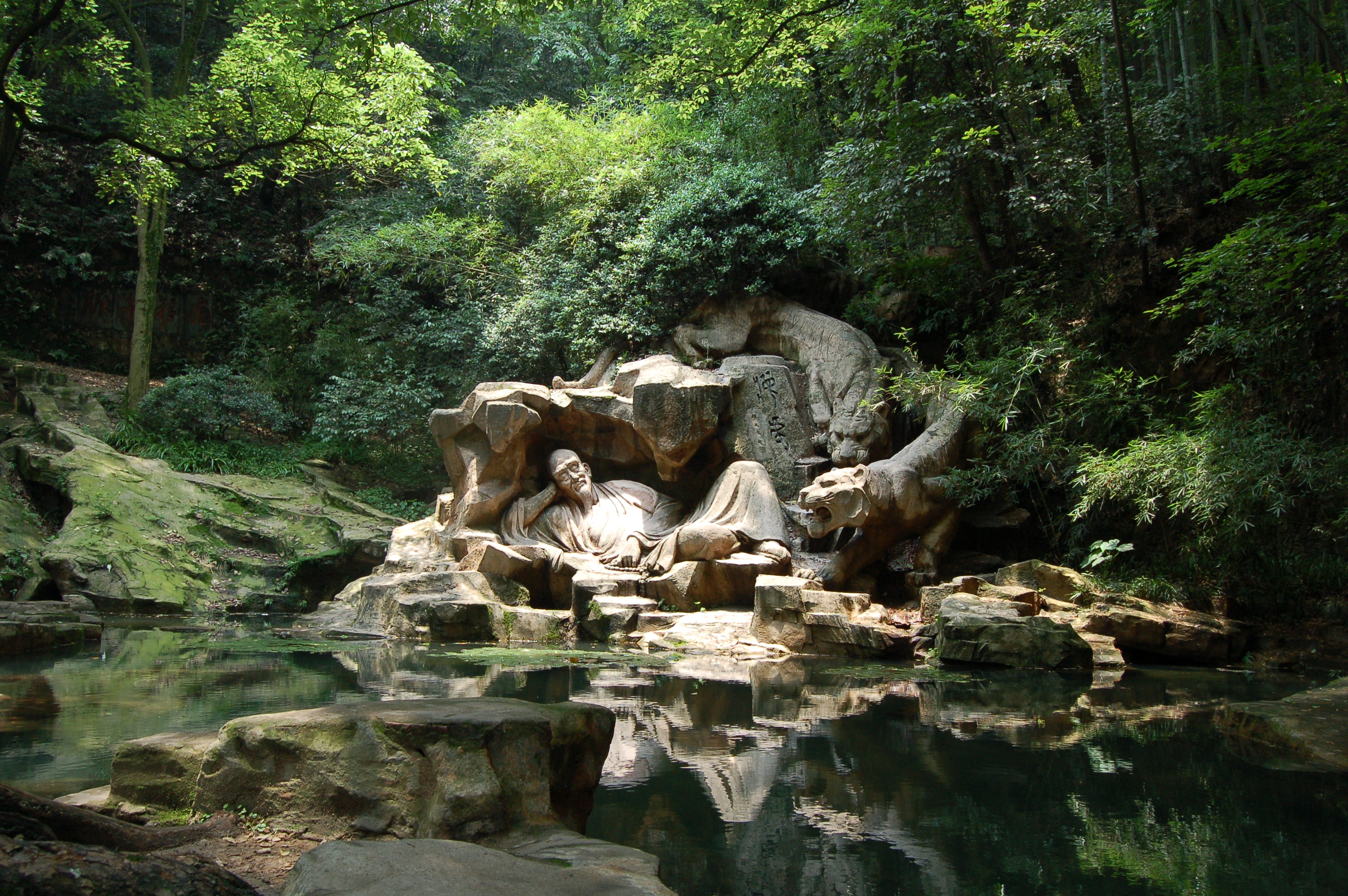
Hupao Spring, the burial place of the monk Ji Gong

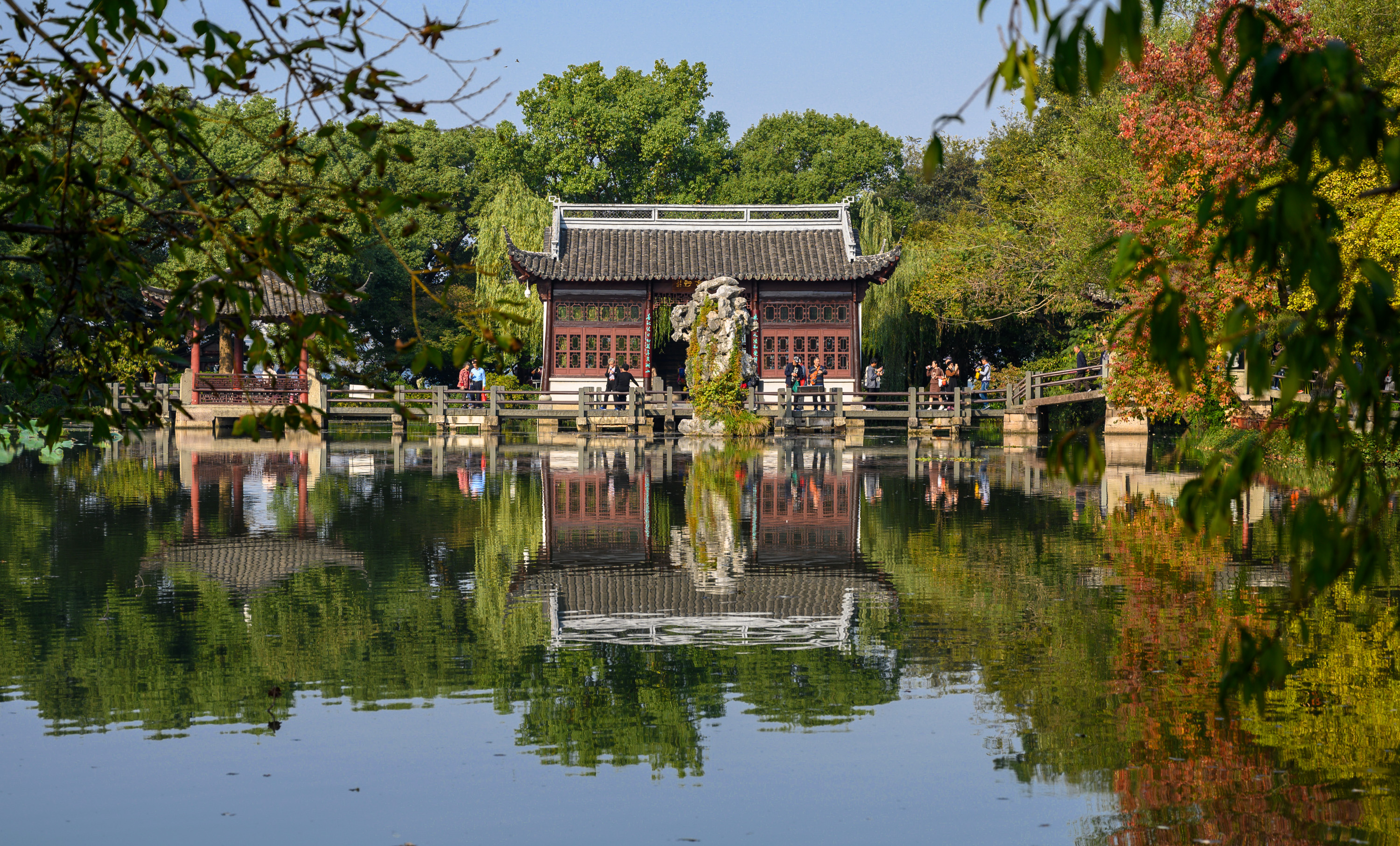
The Su Causeway on West Lake

==== Foreign descriptions ====
Yuan China was very open to foreign visitors, and several returned west describing Hangzhou—under the names Khinzai, Campsay, etc. (Note: For a discussion of the many sources and variant spellings of the names, see Moule. The ultimate Chinese source of these names has been variously given as Jīngshī (京師, "the Capital"); Xingzai, an abbreviated form of Xíngzàisuǒ (行在所, "the Place of Temporary Residence"), which had formerly been a byname for the Song capital from the hope that the court would eventually return north to Kaifeng; and Hangtsei, the Hangzhounese pronunciation of the town's name.)—as one of the foremost cities in the world.

The Venetian merchant Marco Polo supposedly visited Hangzhou in the late 13th century. In his book, he records that the city was "greater than any in the world" and that "the number and wealth of the merchants, and the amount of goods that passed through their hands, was so enormous that no man could form a just estimate thereof". Polo's account greatly exaggerates the city's size, although it has been argued that the "hundred miles" of walls would be plausible if Chinese miles were intended instead of Italian ones and that the "12,000 stone bridges" might have been a copyist error born from the city's 12 gates. According to the Italian explorer Odoric of Pordenone, Hangzhou was the greatest city in the world. It was heavily populated and filled with large family estates. Bread, pork, rice, and wine were abundant despite the large population.

In the 14th century, the Moroccan traveler Ibn Battuta arrived; his later account concurred that al-Khansā was "the biggest city I have ever seen on the face of the earth." He visited Hangzhou in 1345 and noted its charm and said the city was on West Lake and surrounded by gentle green hills. He said there were a large number of well-crafted and well-painted Chinese wooden ships with colored sails and silk awnings in the canals. He attended a banquet held by Qurtai, the Yuan Mongol administrator of the city, who according to Ibn Battuta, was fond of the skills of local Chinese conjurers.

Hangzhou's reputation among Europeans of the time was such that it was the intended destination of Christopher Columbus' first voyage to the Americas in 1492-93.

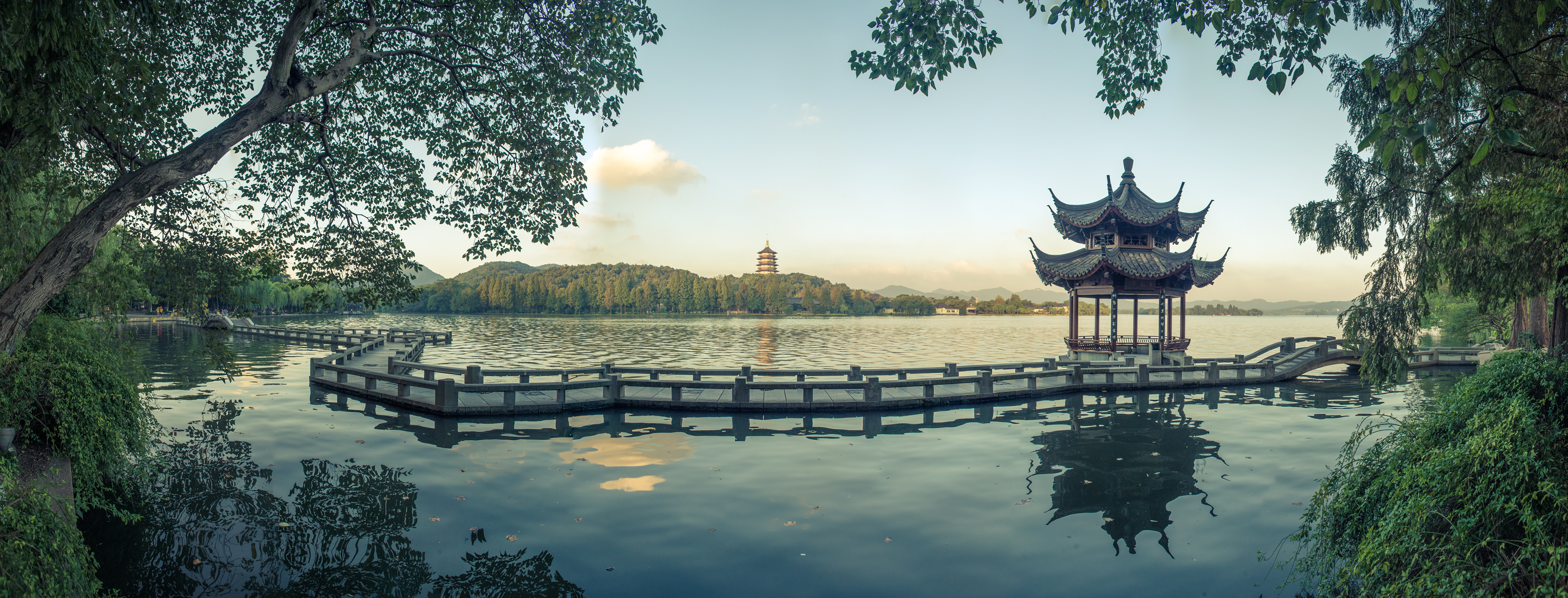
West Lake

=== Modern history ===
The city remained an important port until the middle of the Ming dynasty era, when its harbor slowly silted up. Under the Qing, it was the site of an imperial army garrison.

In 1856 and 1860, the Taiping Heavenly Kingdom occupied Hangzhou. The city was heavily damaged during its conquest, occupation, and eventual reconquest by the Qing army.

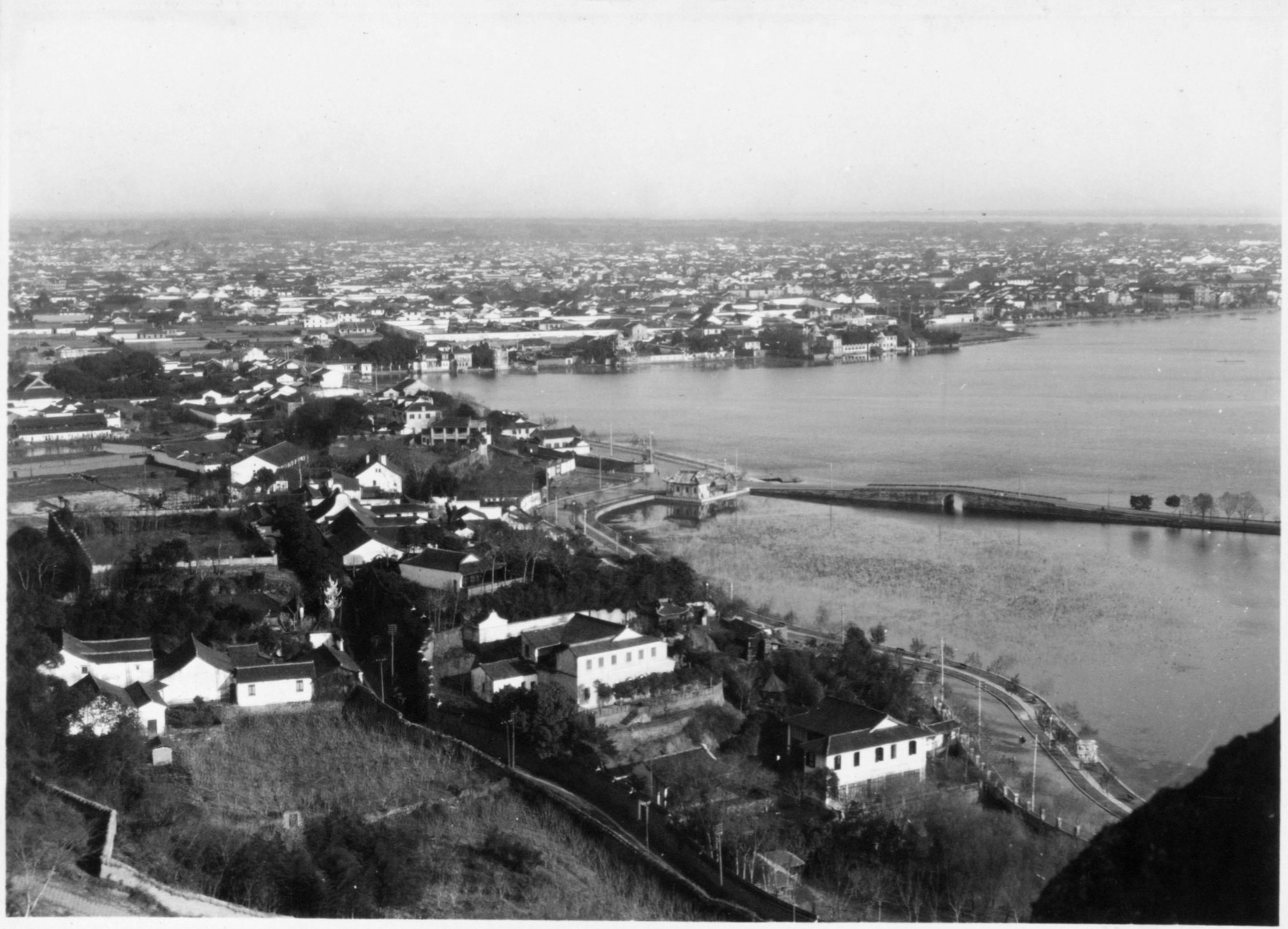
View with Duanqiao in the foreground, looking toward the city from the West Lake, 1931.

After the collapse of the Qing dynasty, control of Hangzhou was contested by warlords, particularly those of the Anhui and Zhili cliques, until the Kuomintang's successful Northern Expedition. It was then more fully administered by the Republic of China from 1927 to 1937. From 1937 to 1945, the city was occupied by Japan. The Kuomintang returned in 1945 and governed until May 3, 1949, when the People's Liberation Army entered Hangzhou and the city came under Chinese Communist Party (CCP) control. During the late Cultural Revolution, Hangzhou was stage to a series of labor unrest and factional fighting known as the 1975 Hangzhou incident. After Deng Xiaoping's reform policies started being enacted in 1978, Hangzhou took advantage of being situated in the Yangtze Delta to bolster its development. It is now one of China's most prosperous major cities and hosted the eleventh G20 summit in 2016.

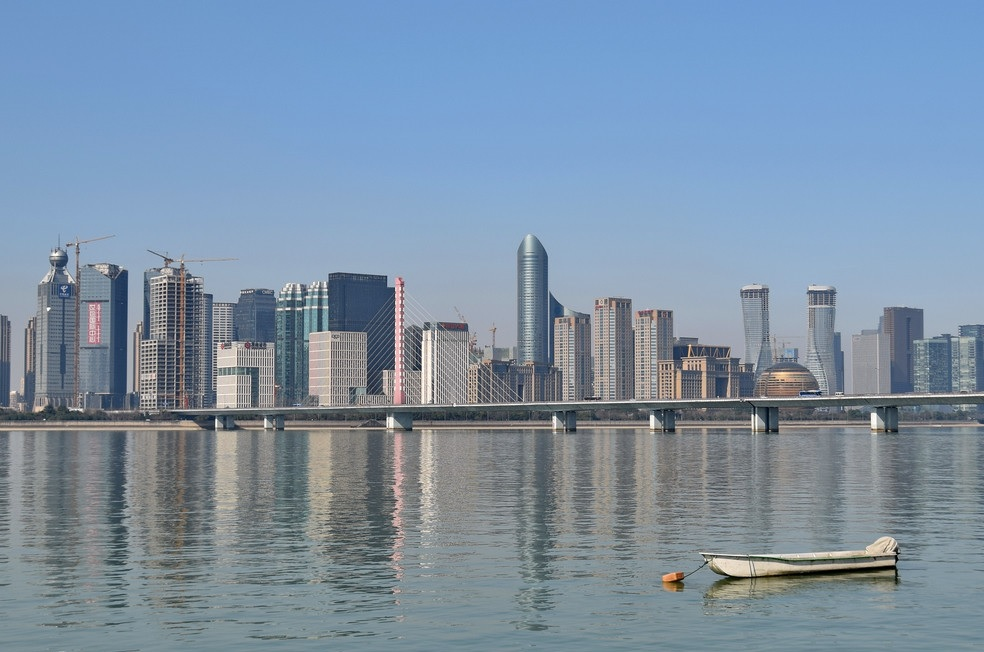
Hangzhou CBD

In February 2020, the city undertook strong curfew measures owing to the coronavirus outbreak that spread across China from Wuhan.

In 2022, Hangzhou became the third Chinese city to host the Asian Games, after Beijing in 1990 and Guangzhou in 2010.

== Geography ==
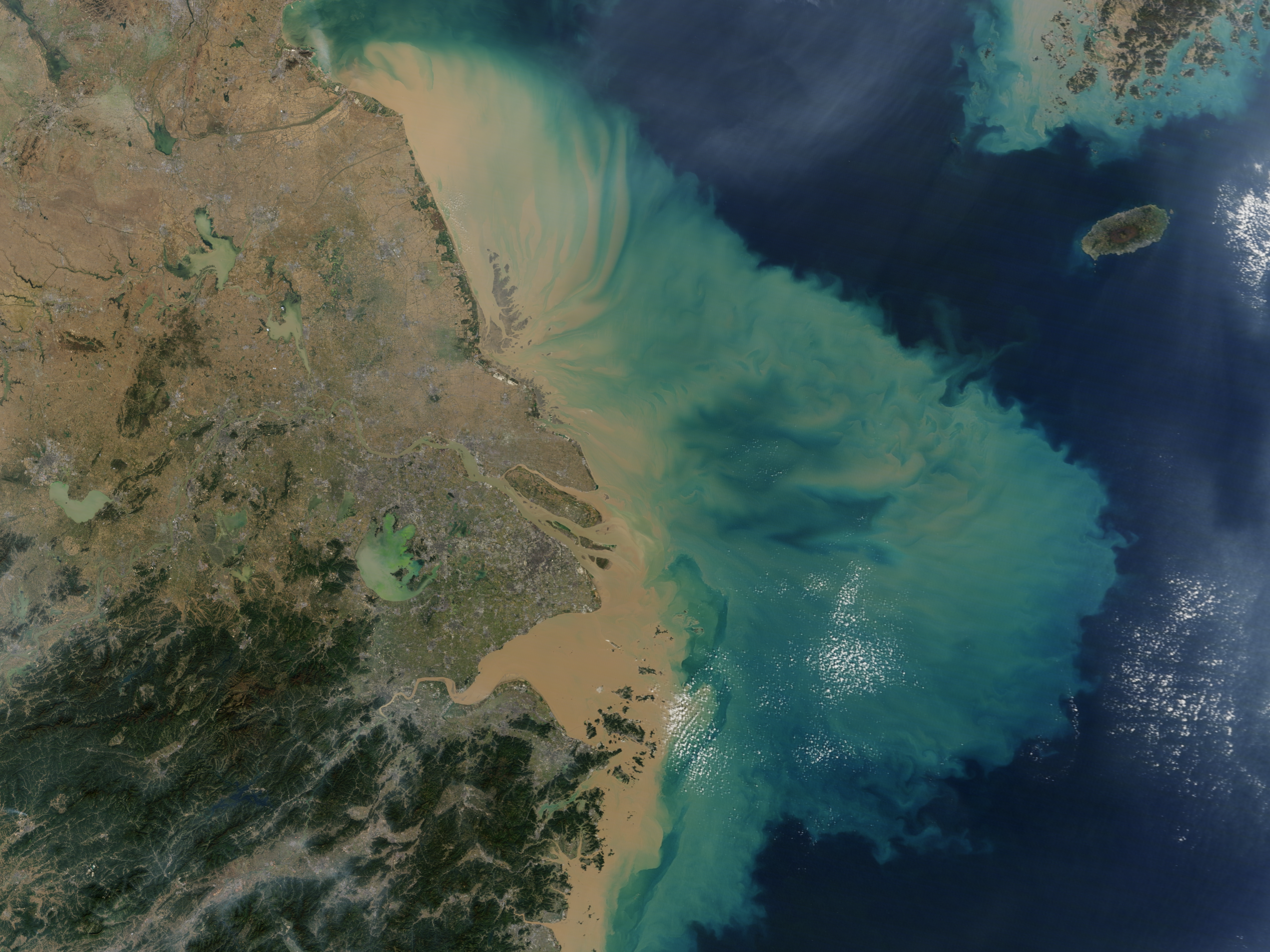
A satellite image of the Yangtze River Delta. The Yangtze's natural sediment discharge can be seen.

Hangzhou is located in northwestern Zhejiang province, at the southern end of the Grand Canal of China, which runs to Beijing, in the south-central portion of the Yangtze River Delta. Its administrative area (sub-provincial city) extends west to the mountainous parts of Anhui province, and east to the coastal plain near Hangzhou Bay. The city center is built around the eastern and northern sides of the West Lake, just north of the Qiantang River.

The Qiantang River is the largest river in Zhejiang Province, China. Every year during August 15 to August 18 of the lunar month in China, the Qiantang Tide occurs. It is called "the Biggest Tide in the World". The world's largest tidal bore races up the Qiantang River through Hangzhou reaching up to 12 m (39 ft) in height.

=== Climate ===
Hangzhou

Climate chart (precipitation, max. and min. temperature)
J	F	M	A	M	J	J	A	S	O	N	D
93 9 2	90 11 4	136 16 8	117 22 13	127 27 18	258 29 22	168 34 26	177 33 25	113 29 21	74 24 16	75 18 10	64 11 4
- █ Average max. and min. temperatures in °C
- █ Precipitation totals in mm
- Source: The National Centers for Environmental Information (NCEI)
Imperial conversion
J	F	M	A	M	J	J	A	S	O	N	D
3.7 47 36	3.5 52 39	5.3 61 46	4.6 72 55	5 80 64	10 85 71	6.6 93 78	7 92 78	4.5 84 71	2.9 74 60	3 64 50	2.5 52 40
- █ Average max. and min. temperatures in °F
- █ Precipitation totals in inches

Hangzhou's climate is humid subtropical (Köppen Cfa) with four distinct seasons, characterised by long, very hot, humid summers and chilly, cloudy and drier winters, albeit with occasional snow. The mean annual temperature is 17.0 °C (62.6 °F), with monthly daily averages ranging from 5 °C (41.0 °F) in January to 29.3 °C (84.7 °F) in July. The city receives an average annual rainfall of 1,438 mm (56.6 in) and is affected by the plum rains of the Asian monsoon in June. In late summer (August to September), Hangzhou suffers typhoon storms, but typhoons seldom strike it directly. Generally they make landfall along the southern coast of Zhejiang, and affect the area with strong winds and stormy rains. Extremes since 1951 have ranged from −9.6 °C (15 °F) on 6 February 1969 up to 41.9 °C (107 °F) on 3 August 2024; unofficial readings have reached −10.5 °C (13 °F), set on 29 December 1912 and 24 January 1916, up to 42.1 °C (108 °F), set on 10 August 1930. With monthly percent possible sunshine ranging from 30% in March to 51% in August, the city receives 1,709.4 hours of sunshine annually.

Climate data for Hangzhou, elevation 42 m (138 ft), (1991–2020 normals, extremes 1951–present)
Month	Jan	Feb	Mar	Apr	May	Jun	Jul	Aug	Sep	Oct	Nov	Dec	Year
Record high °C (°F)	25.4 (77.7)	28.5 (83.3)	34.0 (93.2)	35.1 (95.2)	37.6 (99.7)	39.7 (103.5)	41.3 (106.3)	41.9 (107.4)	39.4 (102.9)	38.4 (101.1)	31.5 (88.7)	26.5 (79.7)	41.9 (107.4)
Mean maximum °C (°F)	17.4 (63.3)	21.3 (70.3)	25.7 (78.3)	30.6 (87.1)	33.8 (92.8)	35.3 (95.5)	37.9 (100.2)	37.3 (99.1)	34.4 (93.9)	30.3 (86.5)	25.1 (77.2)	19.5 (67.1)	38.2 (100.8)
Mean daily maximum °C (°F)	8.6 (47.5)	11.1 (52.0)	15.9 (60.6)	22.1 (71.8)	26.9 (80.4)	29.2 (84.6)	34.0 (93.2)	33.4 (92.1)	28.7 (83.7)	23.6 (74.5)	17.7 (63.9)	11.3 (52.3)	21.9 (71.4)
Daily mean °C (°F)	5.0 (41.0)	7.0 (44.6)	11.1 (52.0)	17.0 (62.6)	22.0 (71.6)	25.0 (77.0)	29.3 (84.7)	28.7 (83.7)	24.5 (76.1)	19.3 (66.7)	13.3 (55.9)	7.4 (45.3)	17.5 (63.4)
Mean daily minimum °C (°F)	2.2 (36.0)	4.0 (39.2)	7.6 (45.7)	13.0 (55.4)	18.0 (64.4)	21.8 (71.2)	25.6 (78.1)	25.4 (77.7)	21.4 (70.5)	15.8 (60.4)	10.0 (50.0)	4.3 (39.7)	14.1 (57.4)
Mean minimum °C (°F)	−3.9 (25.0)	−2.3 (27.9)	0.8 (33.4)	5.8 (42.4)	12.1 (53.8)	16.9 (62.4)	21.5 (70.7)	21.4 (70.5)	16.0 (60.8)	9.0 (48.2)	2.5 (36.5)	−2.8 (27.0)	−4.6 (23.7)
Record low °C (°F)	−8.6 (16.5)	−9.6 (14.7)	−3.5 (25.7)	0.2 (32.4)	7.3 (45.1)	12.8 (55.0)	17.3 (63.1)	18.2 (64.8)	12.0 (53.6)	1.0 (33.8)	−3.6 (25.5)	−8.4 (16.9)	−9.6 (14.7)
Average precipitation mm (inches)	93.3 (3.67)	89.9 (3.54)	135.7 (5.34)	116.8 (4.60)	126.8 (4.99)	258.2 (10.17)	167.5 (6.59)	176.8 (6.96)	113.3 (4.46)	74.1 (2.92)	75.2 (2.96)	64.2 (2.53)	1,491.8 (58.73)
Average precipitation days (≥ 0.1 mm)	12.4	11.7	14.9	13.8	13.3	15.4	12.2	13.7	11.2	8.1	10.6	9.7	147
Average snowy days	4.2	2.8	0.8	0.1	0	0	0	0	0	0	0.2	1.4	9.5
Average relative humidity (%)	74	73	72	70	71	79	73	75	76	73	75	72	74
Mean monthly sunshine hours	95.6	97.7	120.4	144.7	158.9	120.0	204.6	187.9	139.9	141.6	118.9	112.6	1,642.8
Percentage possible sunshine	30	31	32	37	38	28	48	46	38	40	38	36	37
Source: China Meteorological Administration

== Demographics ==
Historical population
Year	Pop.	±%
1990	1,845,055	—
2000	3,662,054	+98.5%
2010	5,849,537	+59.7%
2020	9,236,032	+57.9%
sources: (census dates, urban area qu 区)

Historical population
Year
Pop.
±%
2000
6,878,722
—
2010
8,700,373
+26.5%
2020
11,936,010
+37.2%
2022
12,376,000
+3.7%
2023
12,522,000
+1.2%
2025
12,700,000
+1.4%
sources: (census dates, administrative division)

and (yearend est.)

2023年杭州市人口主要数据公报: (website only visible inside China)

2023年末全市常住人口中，男性为652.1万人，占总人口的52.1%；女性为600.1万人，占总人口 的47.9%。性别比（以女性为100，男性对女性的比例）为108.7。 2025

As of 2023, Hangzhou had a permanent population of 12.522 million (including Xiaoshan and Yuhang), of which 10.543 million (84.2%) lived in urban areas. The encompassing metropolitan area was estimated by the OECD (Organisation for Economic Co-operation and Development) to have, as of 2010, a population of 13.4 million, although other sources put the figure at over 21 million. The Hangzhou metropolitan area includes the major cities of Shaoxing, Jiaxing and Huzhou.

Hangzhou has a life expectancy of 83.18 years for the city's registered population as of 2021, one of the highest in China.

=== Religion ===
In 1848, during the Qing dynasty, Hangzhou was described as the "stronghold" of Islam in China, the city containing several mosques with Arabic inscriptions. A Hui from Ningbo also told an Englishman that Hangzhou was the "stronghold" of Islam in Zhejiang province, containing multiple mosques, compared to his small congregation of around 30 families in Ningbo for his mosque. Within the city of Hangzhou are two notable mosques: New Hangzhou Great Mosque and the Phoenix Mosque. As late as the latter part of the 16th and early 17th centuries, the city was an important center of Chinese Jewry, and may have been the original home of the Kaifeng Jewish community. There was formerly a Jewish synagogue in Ningbo, as well as one in Hangzhou, but no traces of them are now discoverable, and the only Jews known to exist in China were in Kaifeng. Two of the Three Pillars of Chinese Catholicism were from Hangzhou. The Immaculate Conception Cathedral of Hangzhou is one of the oldest Catholic churches in China, dating back 400 years to the Ming dynasty. There was persecution of Christians in the early 21st century in the city.

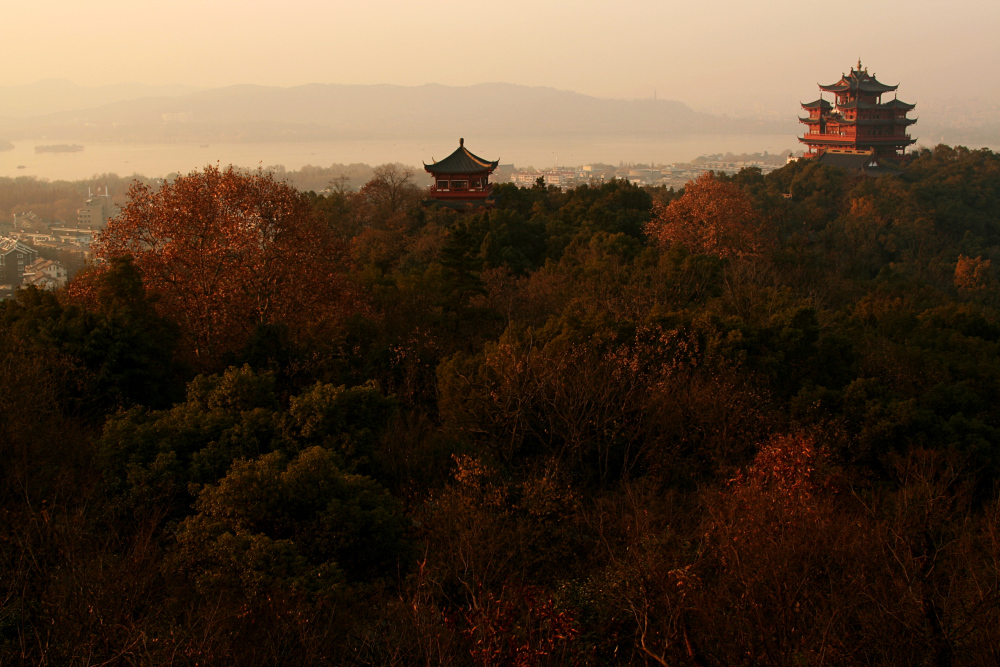
Chenghuangmiao located on Wushan, Hangzhou

There are many temples near the West Lake. Lingyin Temple was founded in the first year of Xianhe in the Eastern Jin Dynasty (AD 326). It has a history of about 1,700 years and is the earliest famous temple in Hangzhou. Yuefei Temple, a temple constructed during the Song Dynasty in 1221 to commemorate Yue Fei, is located near the West Lake. Lingyin Temple (Soul's Retreat), located about 2 km (1.2 mi) west of West Lake, is believed to be the oldest Buddhist temple in the city, which has gone through numerous destruction and reconstruction cycles. Yue Fei Temple, on the northwest shore of West Lake, was originally constructed in 1221 in memory of General Yue Fei, who died due to political persecution. There is also the Jingci Temple, the Baochu Pagoda, and the Leifeng Pagoda. The Qiantang River is the largest river in Zhejiang Province, China. Every year during August 15 to August 18 of the lunar month in China, the Qiantang Tide occurs. It is called "the Biggest Tide in the World".

Other religious sites in Hangzhou include the Liuhe Pagoda, located on Yuelun Hill on the north bank of Qiantang River and the Hupao Temple (虎跑寺).

== Politics ==
=== Structure ===
Title	Party Committee Secretary	Congress Chairperson	Mayor	Hangzhou CPPCC Chairman
Name	Liu Fei	Ji Junmin	Du Xuliang	Wang Wenxu
Ancestral home	Changchun, Jilin	Lin'an, Zhejiang	Yiwu, Zhejiang	Hangzhou, Zhejiang
Born	September 1969 (age 57)	March 1964 (age 62)	September 1971 (age 55)	January 1966 (age 60)
Assumed office	April 2025	May 2025	May 2026	January 2026

In 2019, Hangzhou established a pilot program artificial intelligence-based Internet Court to adjudicate disputes related to ecommerce and internet-related intellectual property claims. Parties appear before the court via videoconference and AI evaluates the evidence presented and applies relevant legal standards.

== Administrative divisions ==
Hangzhou is classified as a sub-provincial city and forms the core of the Hangzhou metropolitan area, the fourth-largest in China. It is the capital and most populous city of Zhejiang Province in East China. Hangzhou comprises 10 districts, 1 county-level city, and 2 counties. The ten urban districts occupy 8,292.31 km^{2} (3,201.68 sq mi) and have a population of 8,241,000, in which there are six central urban districts and four suburban districts. The central urban districts occupy 706.27 km^{2} (272.69 sq mi) and have a population of 3,780,000 and the suburban districts occupy 7,586.04 km^{2} (2,928.99 sq mi) and have a population of 4,461,000. The West Lake Scenic Area holds the country-level administrative power, though not formally a county or district.

In the early 90s, the urban districts of Hangzhou only comprised Shangcheng, Xiacheng, Gongshu, Jianggan. On December 11, 1996, Binjiang District was established. On March 12, 2001, Xiaoshan and Yuhang, formerly two county-level cities under the administration of Hangzhou prefecture-level city, were re-organized as two districts. On December 13, 2014, and in July 2017, Fuyang and Lin'an, formerly two county-level cities under the administration of Hangzhou prefecture-level city, were re-organized as two districts. On April 9, 2021, Linping District and Qiantang District was established.

Map
Subdivision	Chinese	Pinyin	Population (2020)	Area (km^{2})	Density
Central Urban Districts
Shangcheng District	上城区	Shàngchéng Qū	1,323,467	119.68	13,238.68
Gongshu District	拱墅区	Gǒngshù Qū	1,120,985	98.58	8,288.81
Xihu District	西湖区	Xīhú Qū	1,112,992	309.41	2,876.44
Binjiang District	滨江区	Bīnjiāng Qū	503,859	72.22	5,427.86
(West Lake Scenic Area)	(西湖风景名胜区)	Xīhú Fēngjǐng Míngshèng Qū			
Suburban Districts
Xiaoshan District	萧山区	Xiāoshān Qū	2,011,659	1000.64	1,212.42
Yuhang District	余杭区	Yúháng Qū	1,226,673	942.38	1,304.94
Linping District	临平区	Línpíng Qū	1,175,841	286.03	17,933.86
Qiantang District	钱塘区	Qiántáng Qū	769,150	523.57	5,930.00
Fuyang District	富阳区	Fùyáng Qū	832,017	1,821.03	407.46
Lin'an District	临安区	Lín'ān Qū	634,555	3,118.77	190.14
Counties
Tonglu County	桐庐县	Tónglú Xiàn	453,106	1,829.59	236.12
Chun'an County	淳安县	Chún'ān Xiàn	328,957	4,417.48	81.04
County-level City
Jiande City	建德市	Jiàndé Shì	442,709	2,314.19	192.72

== Economy ==
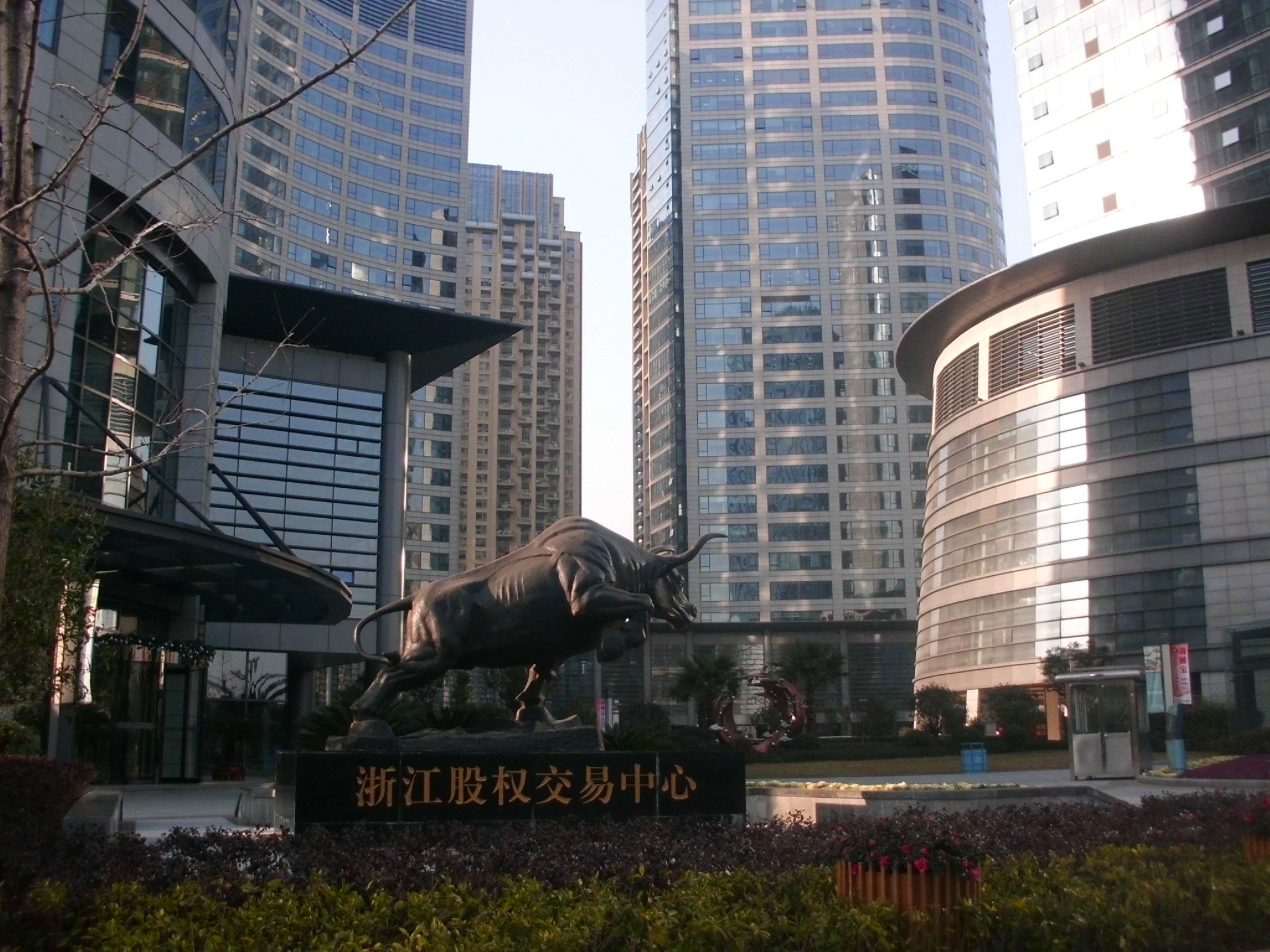
Zhejiang Stock Exchange in the Qianjiang Central Business District

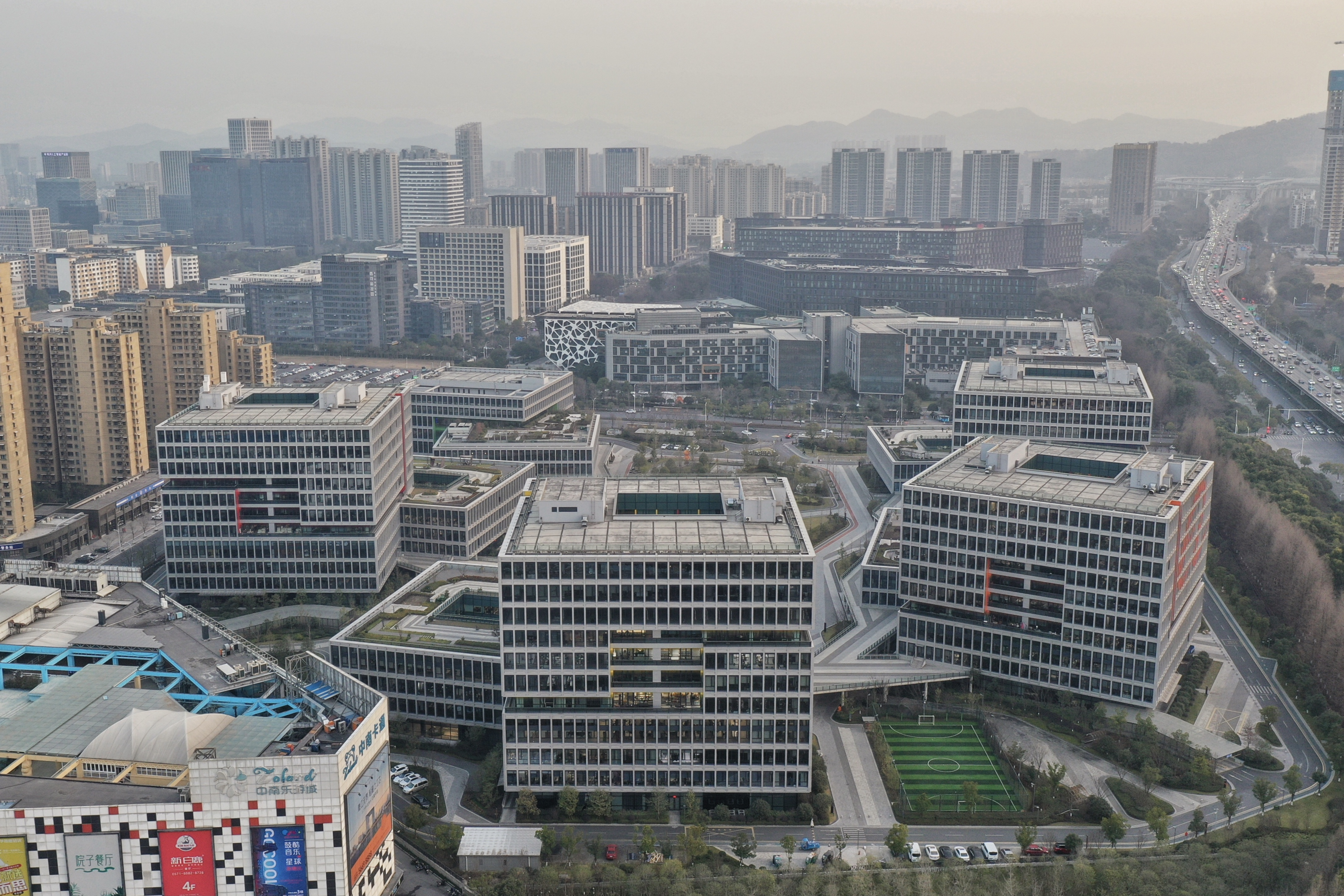
Alibaba Group Headquarters

City	Area km^{2}	Population (2020)	GDP (CN¥)	GDP (US$)
Hangzhou	16,821	11,936,010	CN¥ 1,875.3 billion	US$345.593 billion
Shaoxing	8,279	5,270,977	CN¥ 735.1 billion	US$109.309 billion
Jiaxing	4,009	5,400,868	CN¥ 673.9 billion	US$100.209 billion
Huzhou	5,818	3,367,579	CN¥ 385.0 billion	US$57.250 billion
Quzhou	8,846	2,276,184	CN¥ 200.3 billion	US$29.785 billion
Huangshan	9,807	1,470,000	CN¥ 100.2 billion	US$14.900 billion
Hangzhou metropolitan area	53,582	29,721,618	CN¥ 3.970 trillion	US$590.339 billion

Hangzhou's economy has rapidly developed since its opening up in 1992. It is an industrial city with many diverse sectors such as light industry, agriculture, and textiles. It is considered an important manufacturing base and logistics hub for coastal China. Additionally, the city is an e-commerce and technology hub. The 2001 GDP of Hangzhou was RMB 156.8 billion, which ranked second among all of the provincial capitals after Guangzhou. The city has more than tripled its GDP since then, increasing from RMB 156.8 billion in 2001 to RMB 1.3509 trillion in 2018 and GDP per capita increasing from US$3,020 to $21,184. As of 2019, the Hangzhou metropolitan area was estimated to produce a gross metropolitan product (nominal) of 3.2 trillion yuan ($486.53 billion), making it larger than the economies of Argentina, with a GDP of $452 billion (the 26th biggest in the World) and Nigeria with a GDP of $448 billion (the largest in Africa).

A study conducted by PwC and China Development Research Foundation saw Hangzhou ranked first among "Chinese Cities of Opportunity". Hangzhou is also considered a World City with a "Beta+" classification according to GaWC. Hangzhou ranked 89 in the Global Financial Centres Index in 2018. It was also ranked first in the China Emerging City Rankings of the Economist Intelligence Unit, which assesses Chinese cities growth potential, in both 2021 and 2022. Hangzhou ranks 11th in the world and 6th in China (after Beijing, Shanghai, Hong Kong, Shenzhen and Guangzhou) in terms of the number of billionaires according to the Hurun Global Rich List 2020. As of August 2023, Hangzhou has the tenth-most Fortune Global 500 headquarters of any city in the world and the fourth-most in China – after Beijing, Shanghai and Shenzhen – within its city limits.

The city is undertaking initiatives to become a smart city by digitising the economy and working towards a cashless economy.

=== Industries ===
Hangzhou is the headquarters of several technology companies including Alibaba Group, NetEase, Ant Group, DeepSeek, Geely, and HikVision. In May 2024 Alibaba opened a new global headquarters that measured around one million sqm across seven buildings for 30,000 employees.As a result of its internet industry, many programmers from other cities such as Shanghai or Beijing have come to Hangzhou. The city has developed many new industries, including medicine, information technology, heavy equipment, automotive components, household electrical appliances, electronics, telecommunication, fine chemicals, chemical fibre and food processing. The city describes its important industries as "1 + 6" industrial clusters, with the "1" referring to the digital economy and the "6" referring to cultural/creative economy, finance, tourism, fashion manufacturing, and high-end equipment manufacturing. As of at least 2023, Hangzhou's economic growth has been led by the digital sector and the creative/cultural sectors. Studies show that the total revenue of Alibaba Group has a positive effect on economic growth of the city but it is only a unidirectional casualty between revenue of the Group and the economic growth in Hangzhou. Specifically a 1% increase in total revenue of Alibaba Group can result in 0.272% in economic growth of the city in the long run.

=== Tourism ===
In March 2013, the Hangzhou Tourism Commission started an online campaign via Facebook, the 'Modern Marco Polo' campaign. Over the next year nearly 26,000 participants applied from around the globe, in the hopes of becoming Hangzhou's first foreign tourism ambassador. In a press conference in Hangzhou on 20 May 2014, Liam Bates was announced as the successful winner and won a $55,000 contract, being the first foreigner ever to be appointed by China's government in such an official role.

=== Development zones ===
Hangzhou Economic and Technological Development Zone was established and approved as a national development zone by the State Council in 1993. It covers an area of 104.7 km^{2} (40.4 sq mi). Encouraged industries include electronic information, biological medicine, machinery and household appliances manufacturing, and food processing. Hangzhou Export Processing Zone was established on April 27, 2000, upon approval of the State Council. It was one of the first zones and the only one in Zhejiang Province to be approved by the government. Its total planned area is 2.92 km^{2} (1.13 sq mi). It is located close to Hangzhou Xiaoshan International Airport and Hangzhou Port.

Hangzhou Hi-Tech Industrial Development Zone was set up with approval from the State Council as a state-level high-tech Industrial Development Zone in March 1991. The HHTZ is composed of three parts, with the main regions being the Zhijiang Sci-Tech Industrial Park and Xiasha Sci-Tech Industrial Park. HHTZ has become one of the most influential high-tech innovation and high-tech industry bases in Zhejiang Province. As of 2013, HHTZ hosts more than 1,100 software developers and BPO enterprises. Major companies such as Motorola, Nokia and Siemens have established R&D centers in the zone. In 2011, the GDP of the zone rose by 13.1 percent, amounting to RMB 41.63 billion. This accounted for 5.9 percent of Hangzhou's total GDP. The HHTZ positions itself as the "Silicon Valley" of China. The Alibaba Group is headquartered in the zone. In 2023 Alibaba sped up construction phase of its global headquarters in Hangzhou amid support from the local government after the company signed a fresh cooperation pact with local authorities.

== Cityscape ==
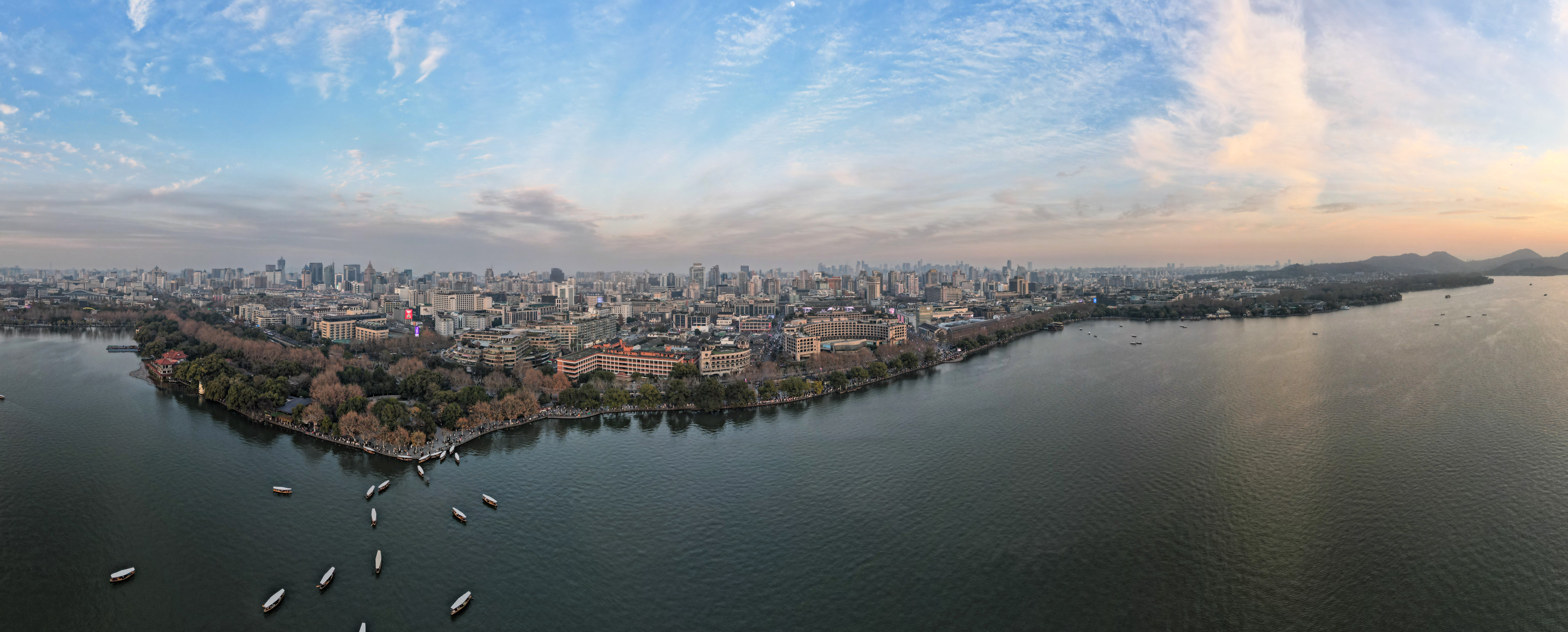
The coastline of Hangzhou's West Lake during sunset. December 2023.

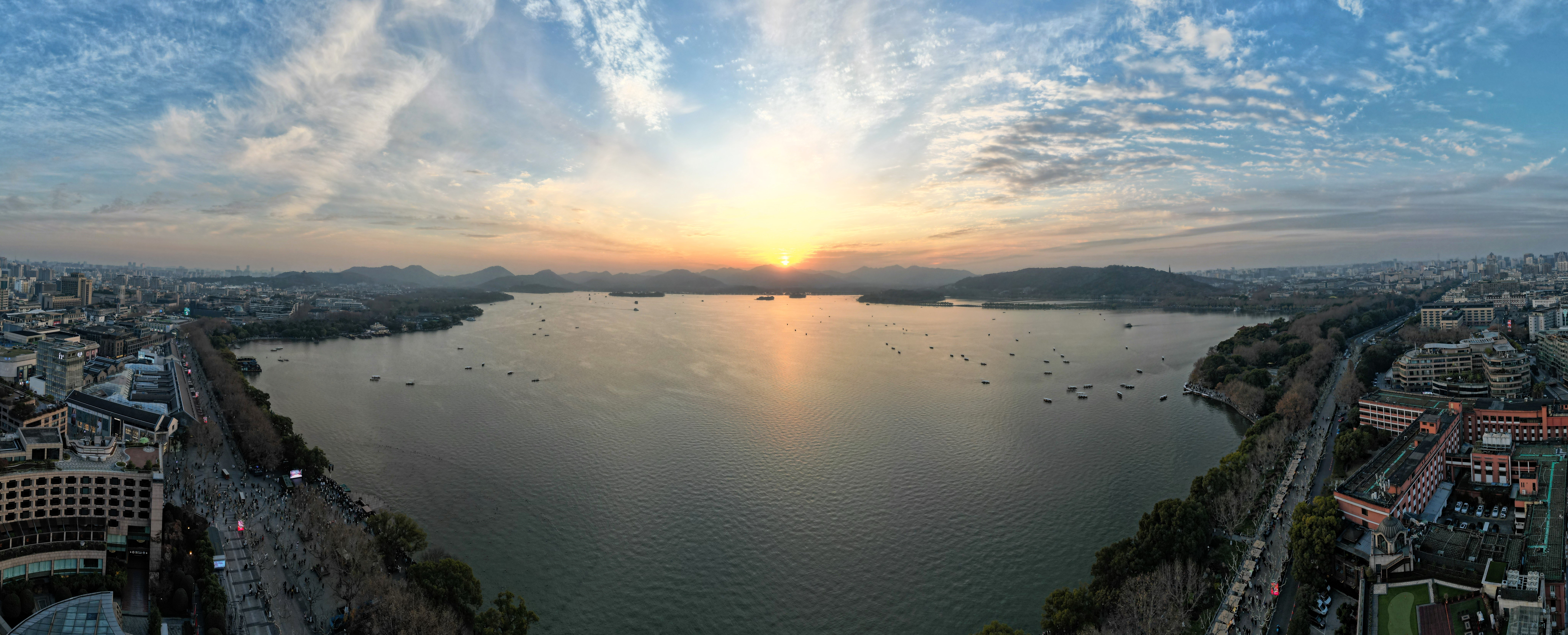
Aerial panorama of West Lake sunset and its lakeside district. December 2023.

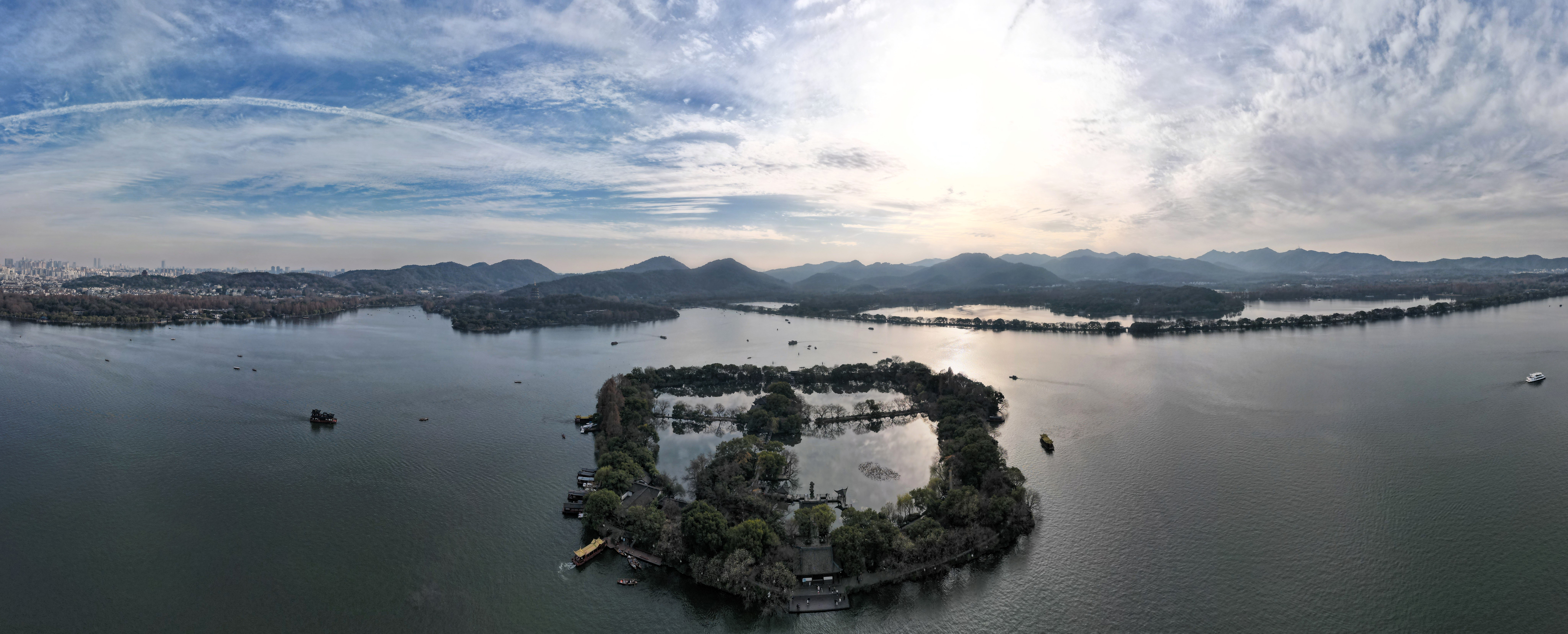
Aerial panorama of West Lake and its surrounding mountains. December 2023.

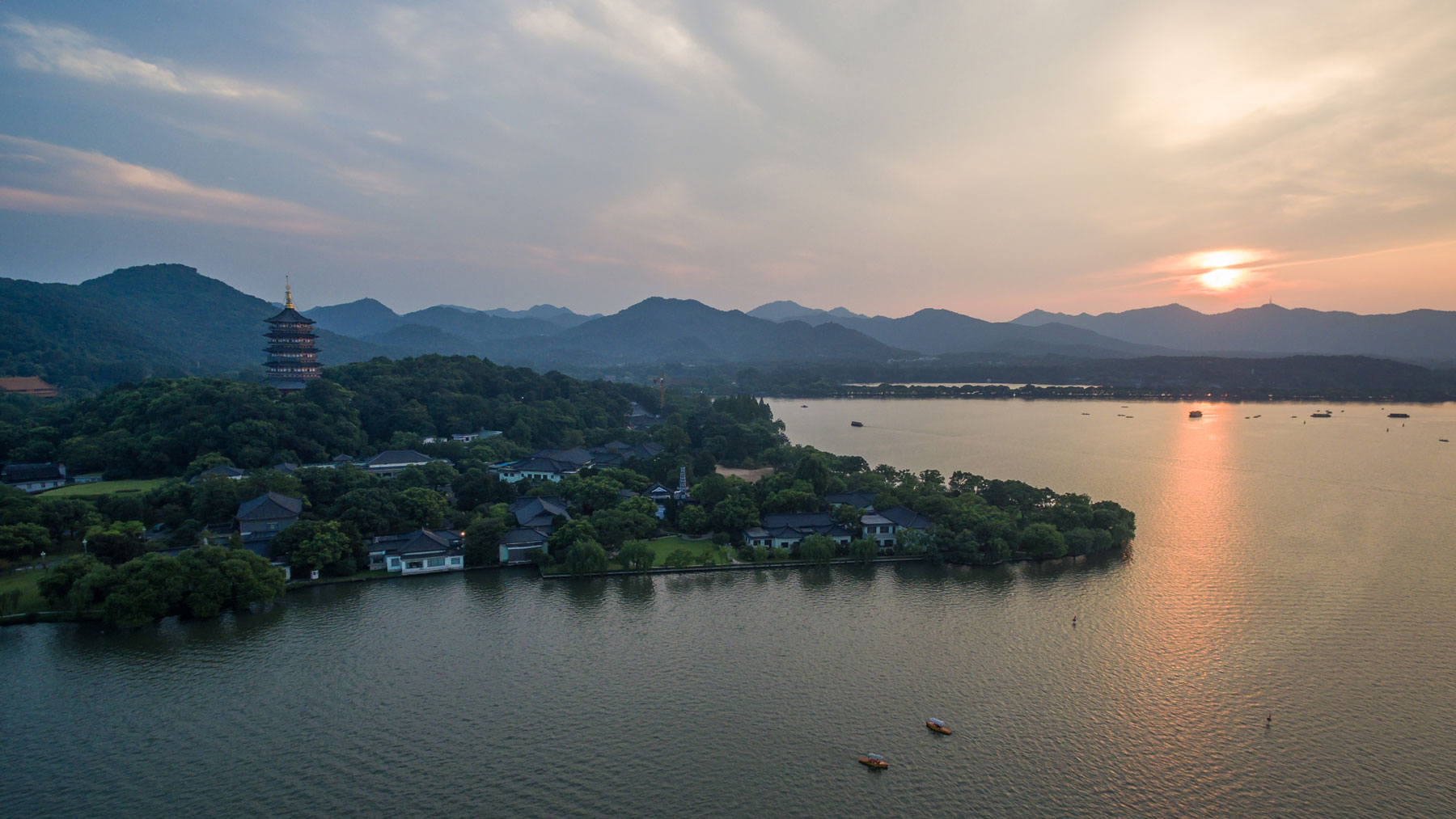
West Lake and Leifeng Pagoda

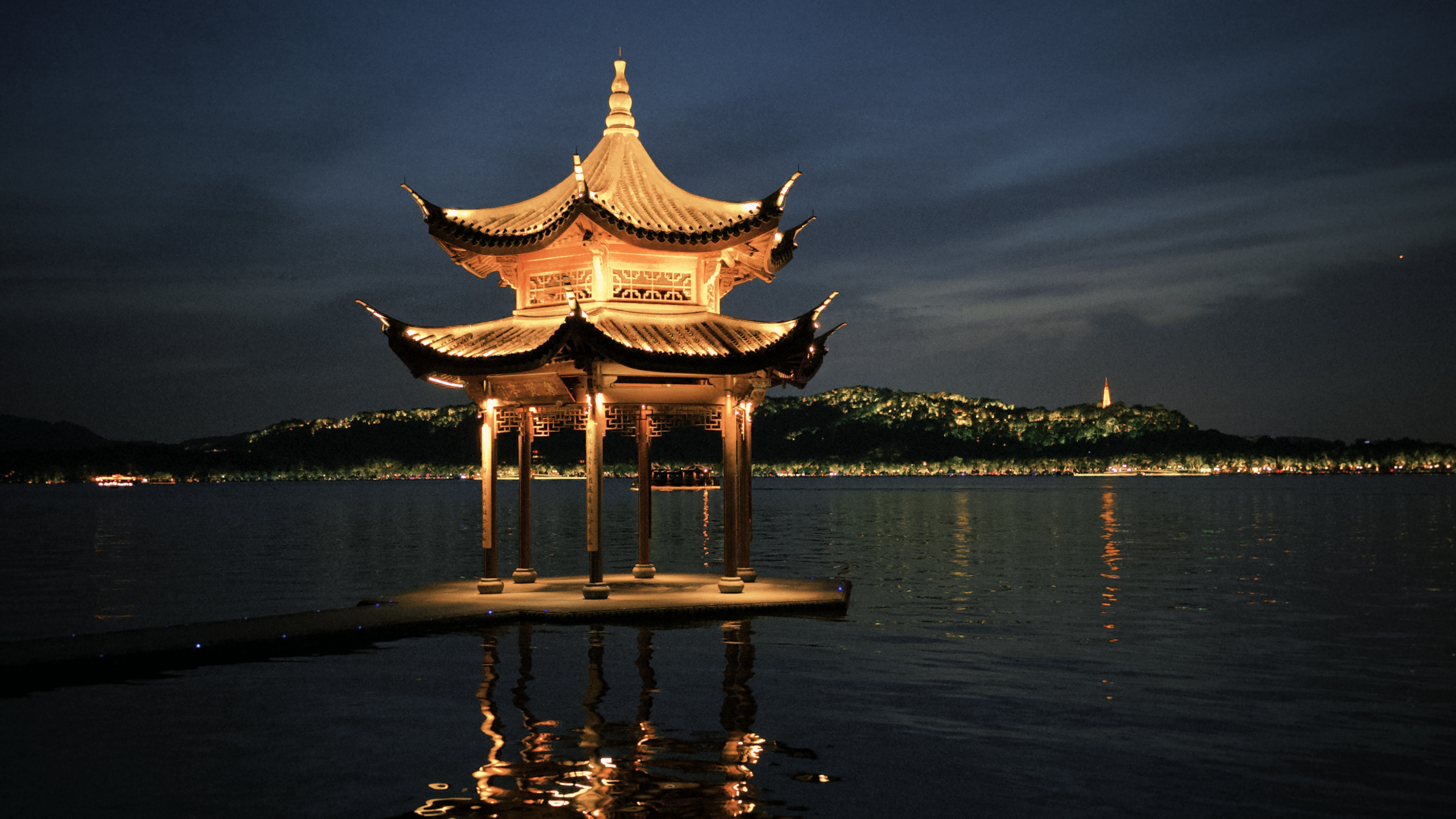
West Lake at night

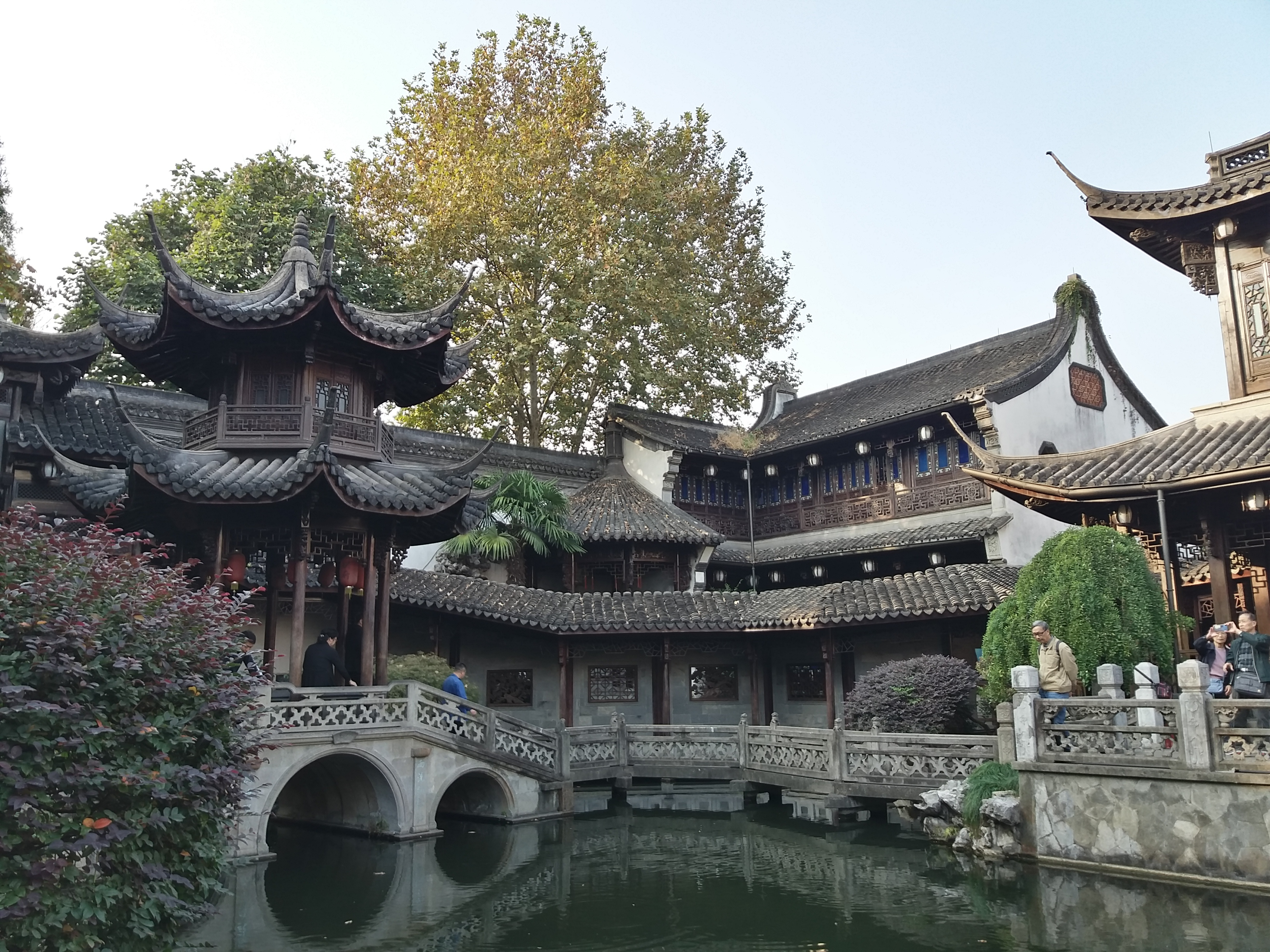
Hu Xueyan Residence, a historic mansion in Hangzhou

Although Hangzhou has been through many recent urban developments, it still retains its historical and cultural heritage and natural environment. Today, tourism remains an important factor for Hangzhou's economy. Hangzhou has numerous skyscrapers, making it the 19th city in the world with the most skyscrapers as well as the 9th in China.

=== Parks and resorts ===
One of Hangzhou's most popular attractions is West Lake, a UNESCO World Heritage Site. The West Lake Cultural Landscape spans approximately 3,323 ha (8,210 acres) and includes some of the city's most notable historic and scenic locations. Surrounding the lake are prominent cultural sites, historical pagodas, and natural features such as hills and tea fields, including Phoenix Mountain. Two major causeways cross the lake.

To the west of the lake lies Dreaming of the Tiger Spring, an area known for its natural spring and its proximity to the famed longjing tea plantations.

Sections of the Grand Canal pass through Hangzhou. In 610 CE, the Jiangnan Canal was dredged and widened along an existing channel to connect Suzhou with Hangzhou. The Grand Canal was designated a UNESCO World Heritage Site in 2014. Historical sites around Gongchen Bridge can be reached via Hangzhou Metro Line 5 from The Grand Canal station or East Gongchen Bridge station.

The West Lake Cultural Square, located in the Xiacheng District, contains several notable institutions, including the Zhejiang Natural History Museum, the Zhejiang Museum of Science and Technology, and the Zhejiang Global Center, one of the tallest buildings in the downtown area at approximately 160 m (520 ft).

The Xixi National Wetland Park was established to preserve the region's wetland ecosystem and encompasses about 10 km^{2} (3.9 sq mi). Restoration projects have included reed beds and fish ponds, and the park is now home to diverse bird species. The area also contains a temple and several historically significant rural dwellings.

Qiandao Lake, a man-made reservoir located in Chun'an County under Hangzhou's jurisdiction, contains the largest number of islands of any lake in China. These islands vary widely in size and form, each with distinctive scenery. The Hangzhou Botanical Garden and the Hangzhou Zoo are both situated in the Xihu District.

== Culture ==
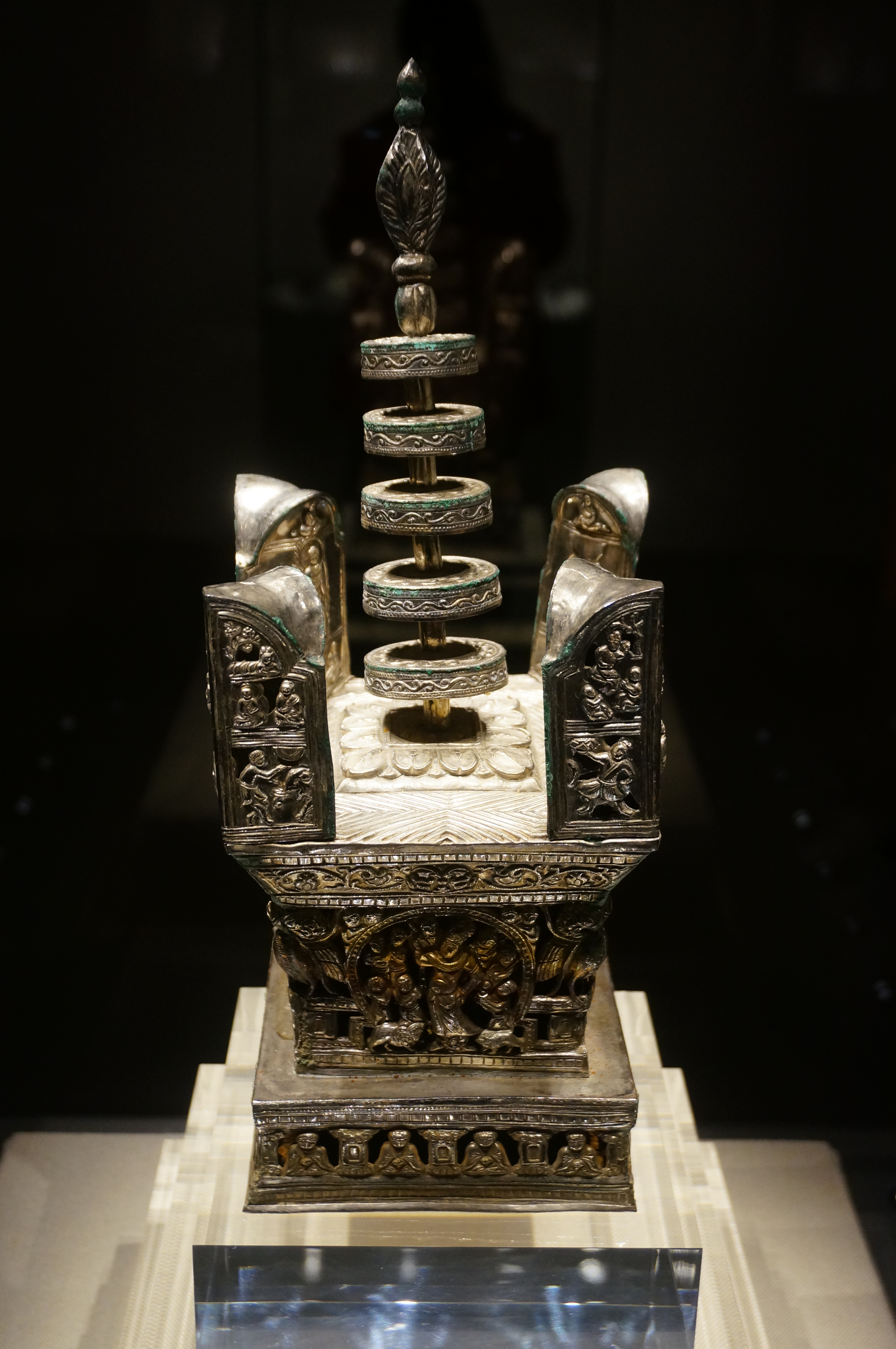
Gilt silver Hōkyōintō unearthed from Leifeng Pagoda Site, Zhejiang Provincial Museum

The native residents of Hangzhou, including those of Zhejiang and southern Jiangsu, speak the Hangzhou dialect, a Wu dialect unique to the area. Hangzhou's dialect differs from those of regions in southern Zhejiang and southern Jiangsu. As the official language defined by China's central government, Mandarin is the dominant spoken language, though it is mutually unintelligible with the Hangzhou dialect. The Hangzhou dialect has an estimated total of 1.2 to 1.5 million speakers.

There are several museums located in Hangzhou including China National Silk Museum, the largest silk museum in the world, China National Tea Museum (中国茶叶博物馆), and Zhejiang Provincial Museum, which has a collection of integrated human studies, exhibition and research with over 100,000 collected cultural relics.

Many theaters in Hangzhou host opera shows such as Yue opera. There are several big shows themed with the history and culture of Hangzhou like Impression West Lake and the Romance of Song Dynasty. The landscapes in Hangzhou bridges stories of celebrities in Chinese history and feelings of ordinary people visiting Hangzhou with joy and enthusiasm.

Hangzhou is home to the China Academy of Art and prominent painters such as Lin Fengmian and Fang Ganmin.

The local government of Hangzhou heavily invests in promoting tourism and the arts, with emphasis placed upon silk production, umbrellas, and Chinese hand-held folding fans.

=== Cuisine ===
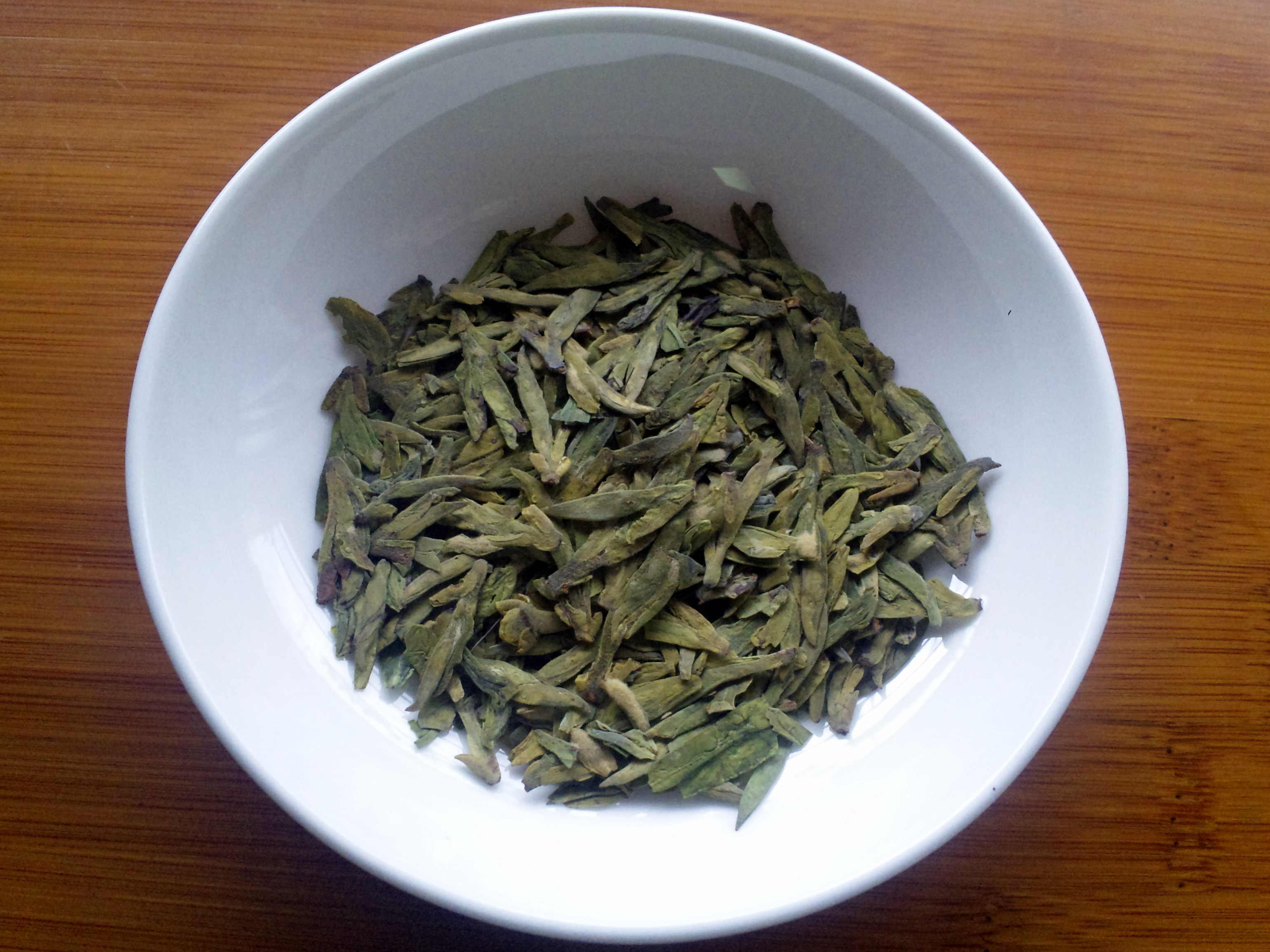
Xihu Longjing (西湖龍井), Longjing tea planted near the West Lake

Hangzhou's local cuisine is often considered to be representative of Zhejiang provincial cuisine, one of China's eight fundamental cuisines. The locally accepted consensus among Hangzhou's natives defines dishes prepared in this style to be "fresh, tender, soft, and smooth, with a mellow fragrance".

Generally, Hangzhou's cuisines tend to be sweeter rather than savoury. The local people enjoy a light diet incorporating river fishes from the Yangtze River. There are historical stories revolving around the origins of local dishes.

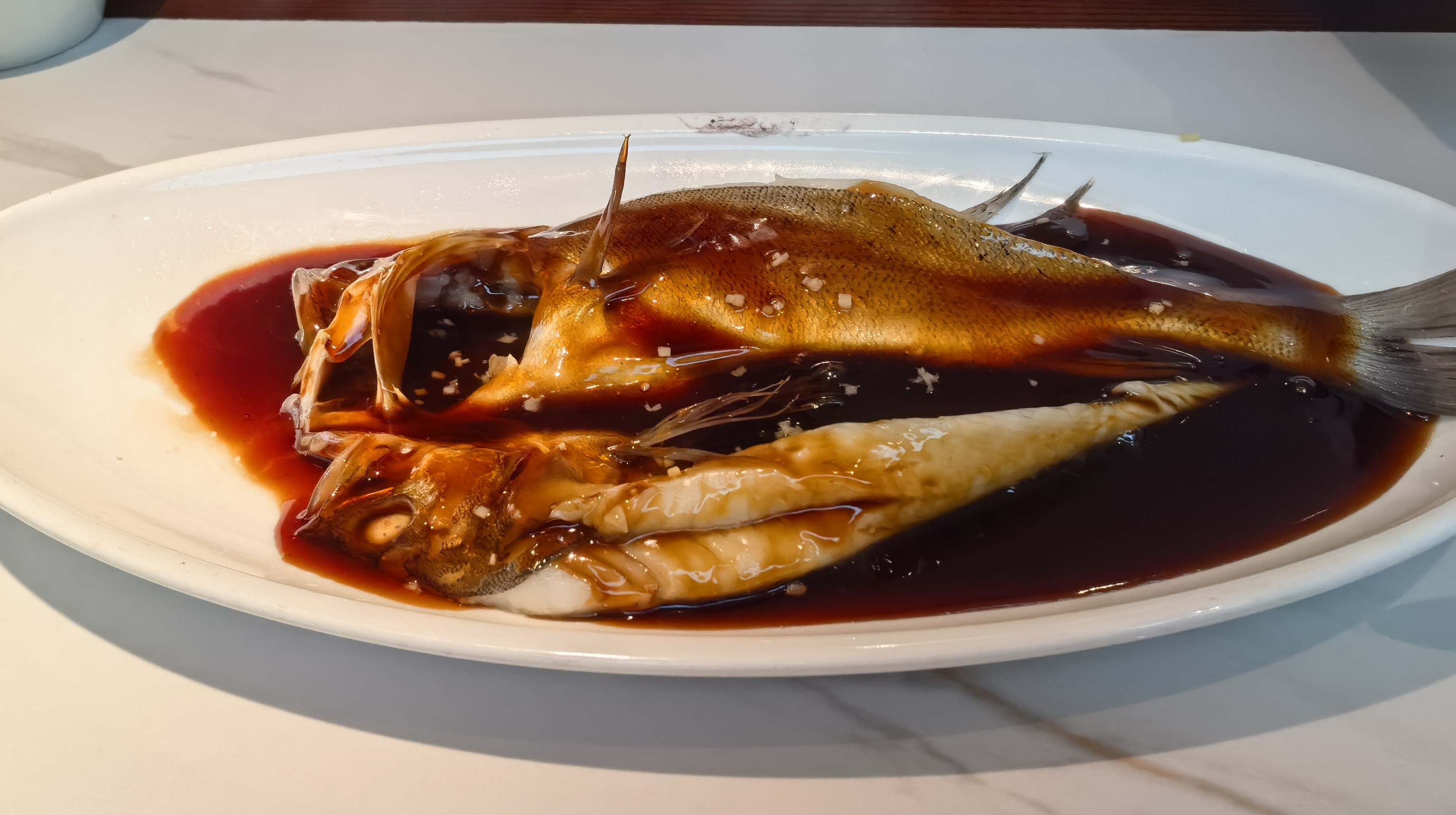
West Lake Fish in Vinegar Gravy

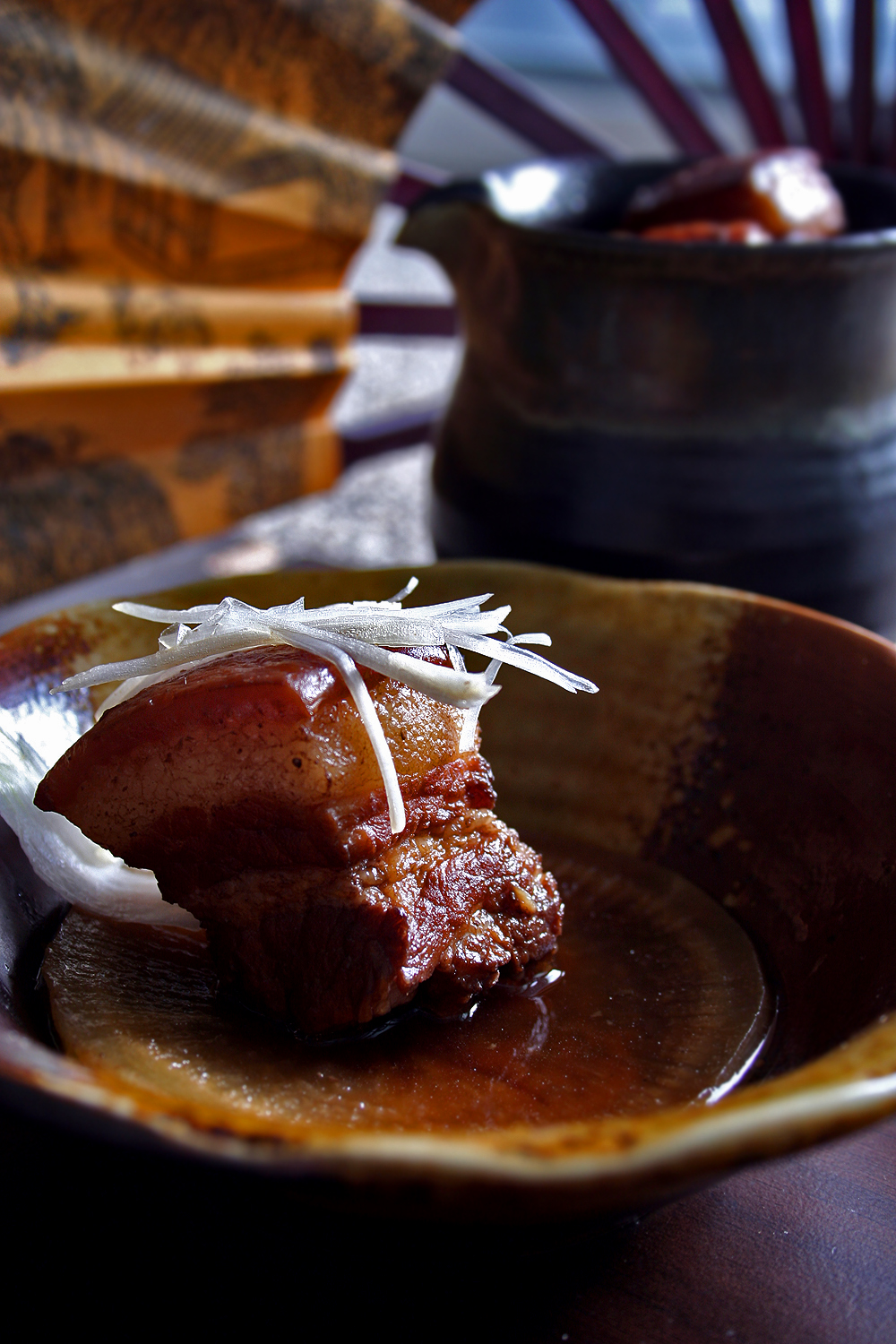
Dongpo pork

Dishes such as Pian Er Chuan Noodles (片儿川), West Lake Vinegar Fish (西湖醋魚), Dongpo Pork (東坡肉), Longjing Shrimp (龍井蝦仁), Beggar's Chicken (叫化鸡), Steamed Rice and Pork Wrapped by Lotus Leaves(荷茶粉蒸肉), Braised Bamboo Shoots (油燜筍), Lotus Root Pudding (藕粉) and Sister Song's Fish Soup (宋嫂魚羹) are some of the better-known examples of Hangzhou's regional cuisine.

Hangzhou is known for originating Longjing tea, a notable variety of green tea. It is the most famous green tea and the most famous tea in China. The tea planted by the West Lake is considered the best Longjing tea. Tea is an important part of Hangzhou's economy and culture.

=== Proverbs ===
An ancient Chinese proverb about Hangzhou and Suzhou is:

There is Heaven above, and Suzhou and Hangzhou below. (上有天堂，下有蘇杭)

This phrase has a similar meaning to the English phrases "Heaven on Earth". Marco Polo in his accounts described Suzhou as "the city of the earth" while Hangzhou is "the city of heaven". The city presented itself as "Paradise on Earth" during the G20 summit held in the city in 2016.

Another saying about Hangzhou is:

Be born in Suzhou, live in Hangzhou, eat in Guangzhou, die in Liuzhou. (生在蘇州，活在杭州，吃在廣州，死在柳州)

=== Ancient book restoration ===
The Hangzhou Ancient Book Restoration and Display Center, affiliated with the Zhejiang Library, offers regular public demonstrations of traditional paper restoration and binding techniques used to preserve ancient Chinese texts. This center plays a key role in the conservation of Jiangnan cultural documents.

== Transportation ==
=== Road ===
Hangzhou has a bus system consisting of a fleet of diesel, hybrid and electric buses, as well as trolleybuses.

Hangzhou was once known for its extensive bus rapid transit network expanding from downtown to many suburban areas through dedicated bus lanes on some of the busiest streets in the city. The system was shut down in July 2025 and ll services have since been converted into regular bus services.

According to a 2022 report, all fuel taxis in the downtown area of Hangzhou are to be replaced with electric vehicles in five years. Starting March 21, 2022, taxi companies "will not be able to register new fuel vehicles" while existing ones should be "retired gradually". It is predicted that all taxis in the downtown area will be electric by 2027.

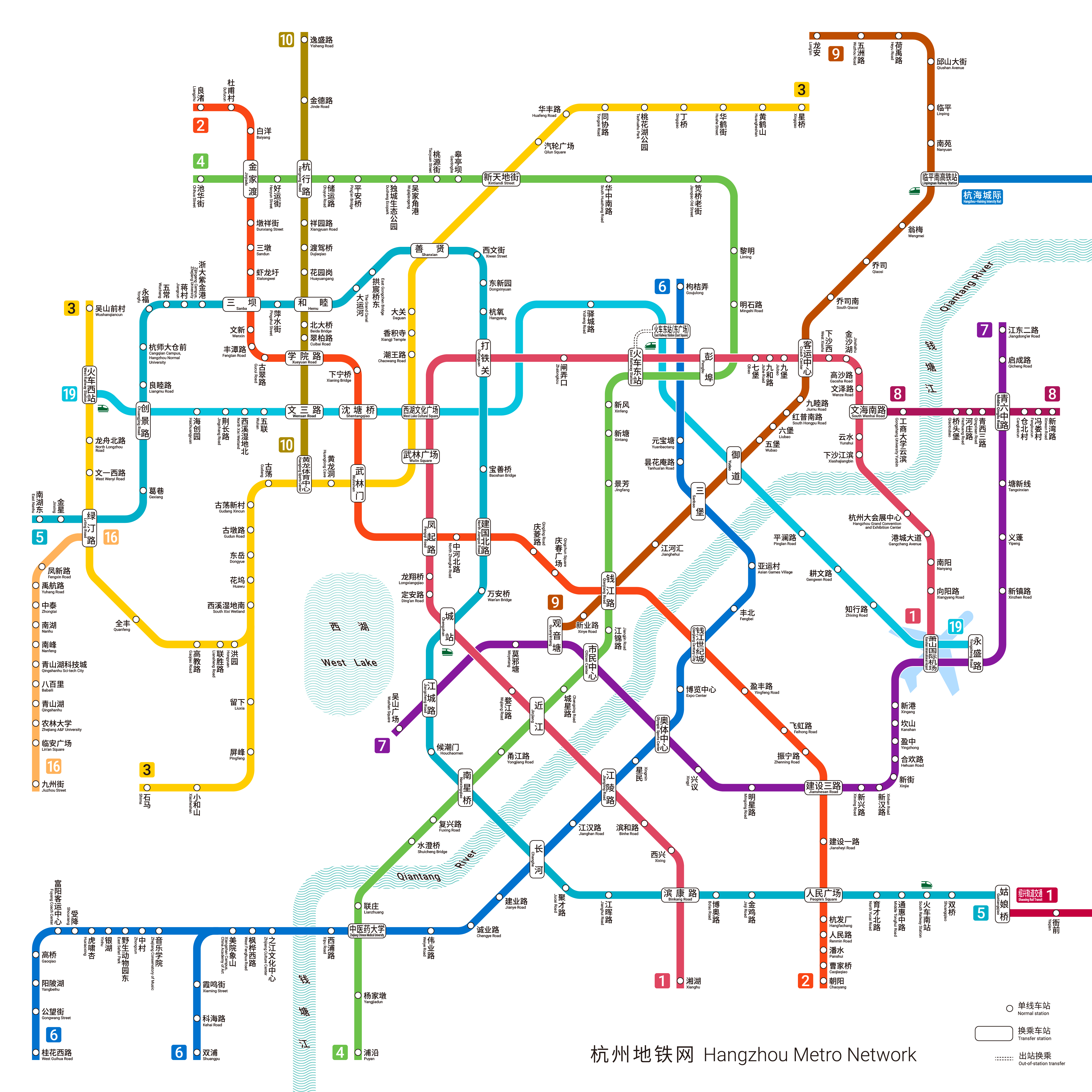
System map of the Hangzhou Metro

=== Metro ===
The construction of the Hangzhou Metro started in March 2006, and Line 1 opened on November 24, 2012. Major expansion plans continue. It is the 17th city in China to have a rapid rail transit system. In 2018, the State Council approved the planning for 15 metro lines, including extensions to the three existing lines, scheduled to open in time for the 2022 Asian Games. As of September 2022, the Hangzhou Metro has a total system length of about 516 kilometres.

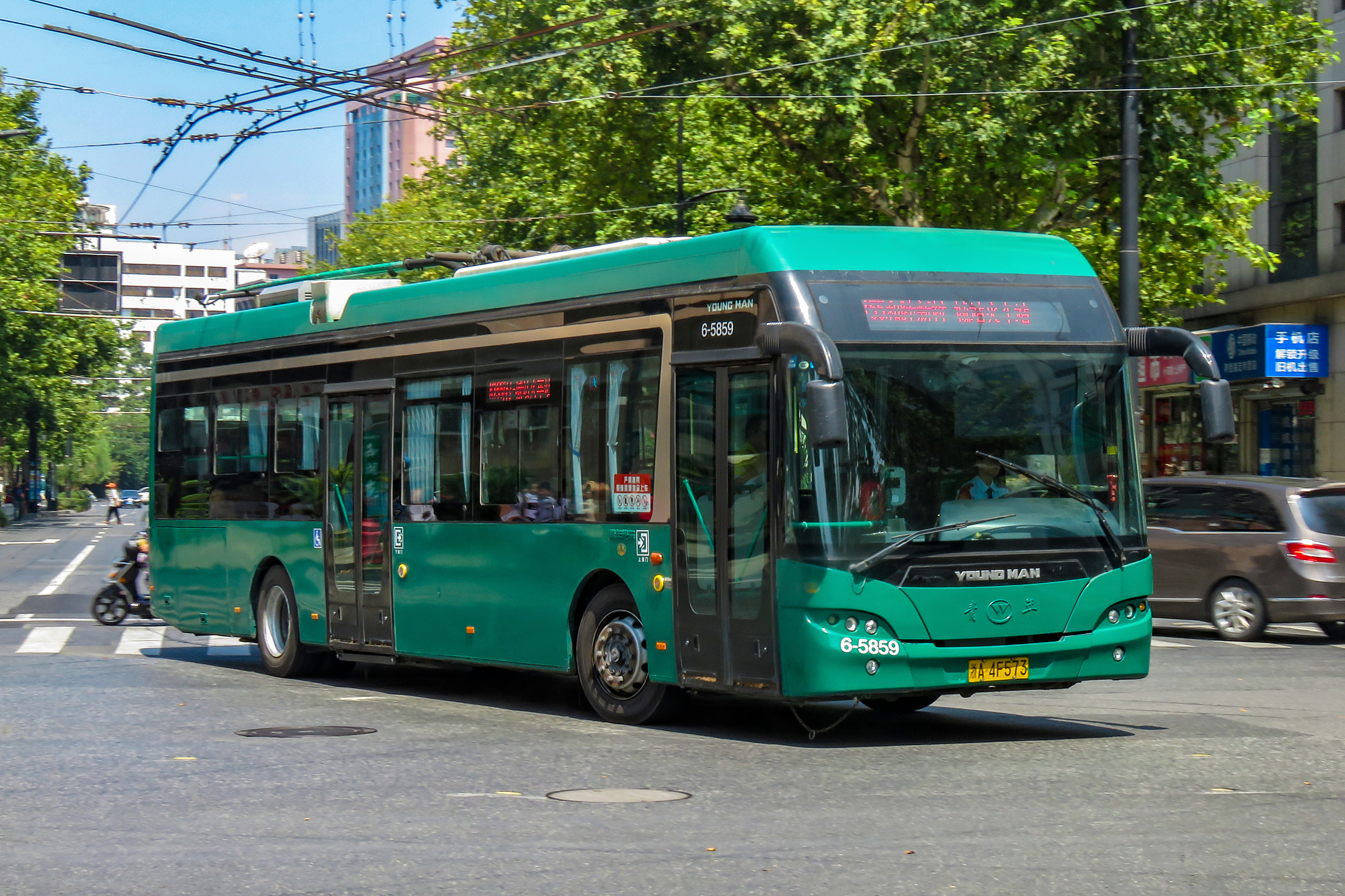
Hangzhou trolleybus

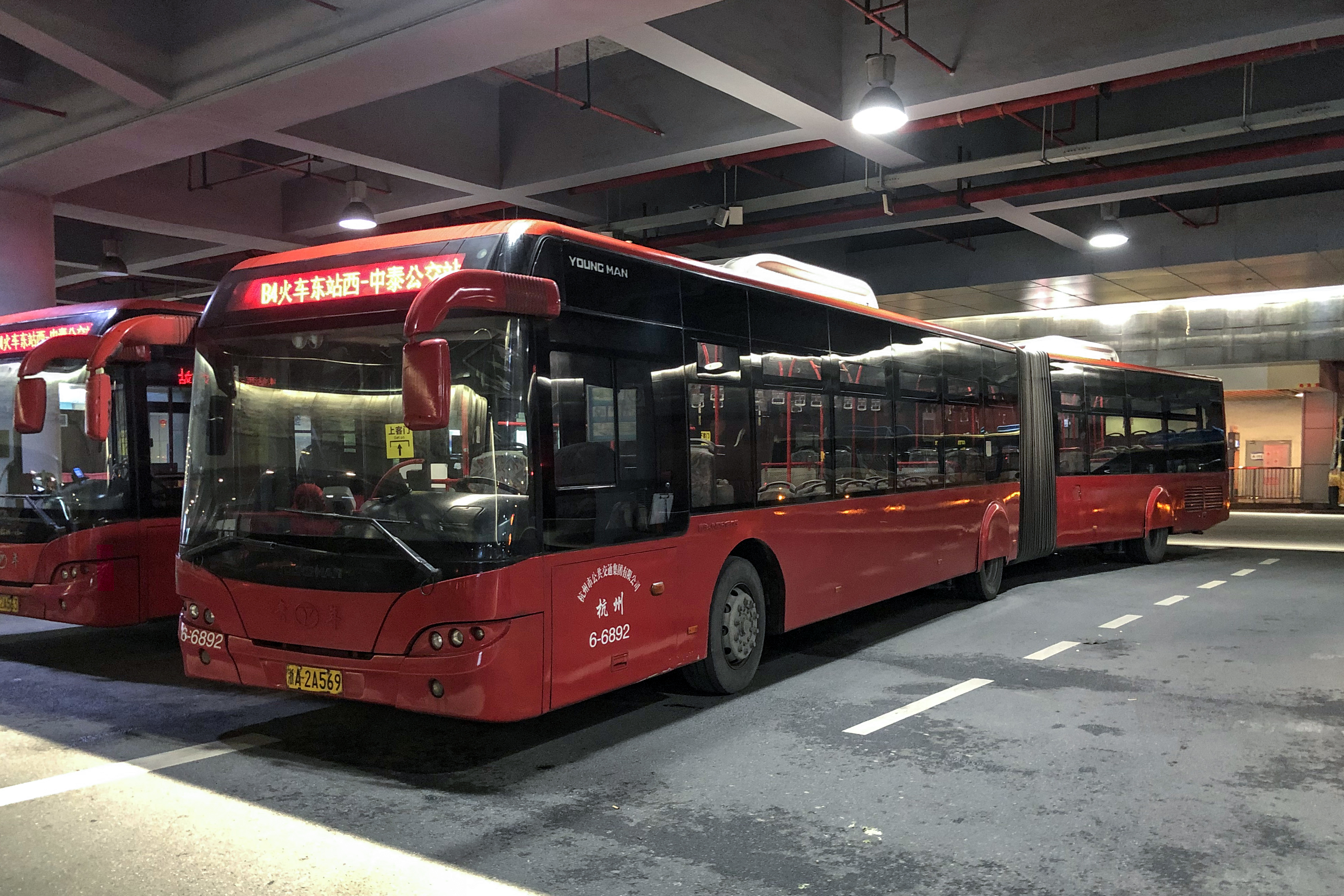
Hangzhou BRT Line 4 (Closed)

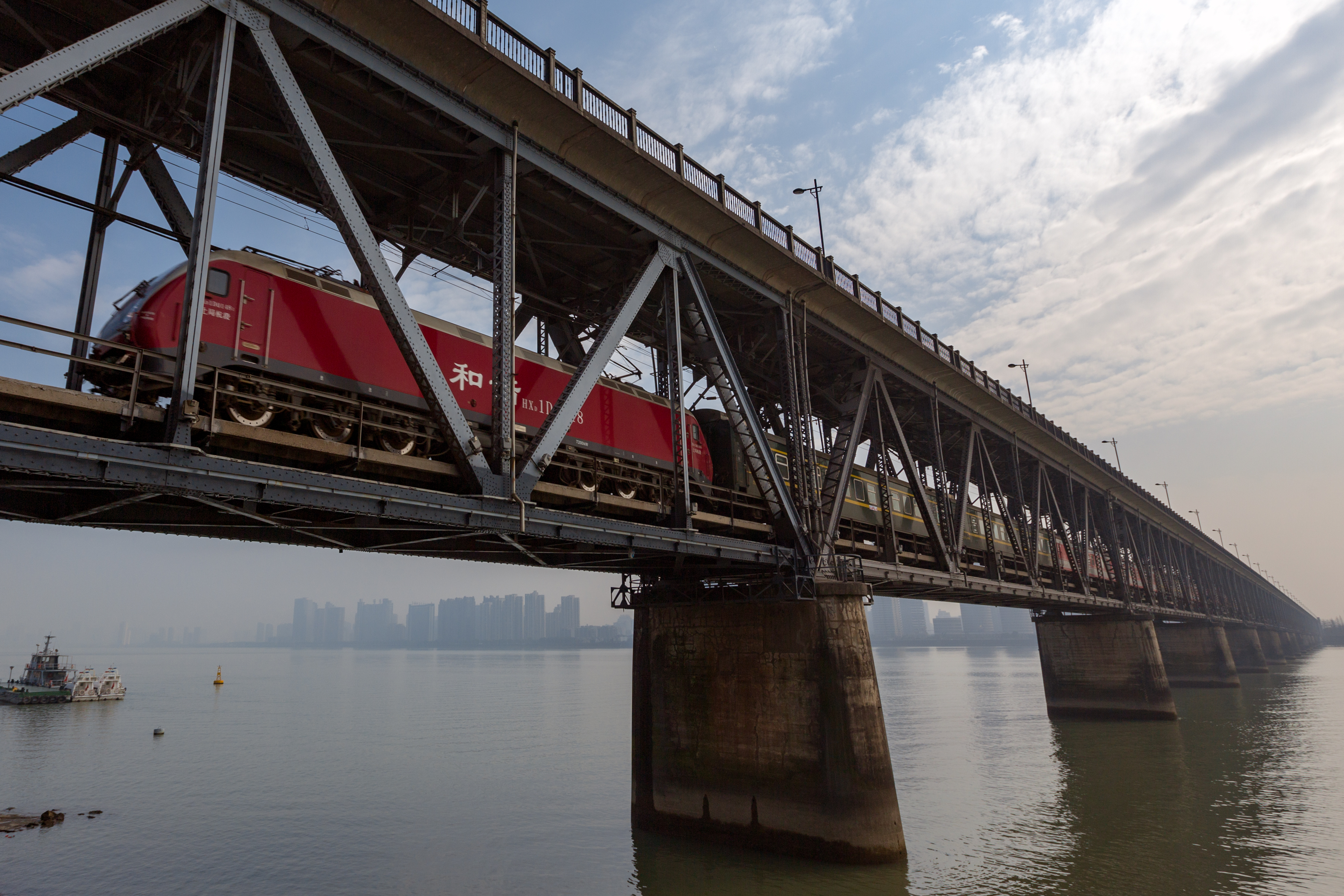
Qiantang River Bridge

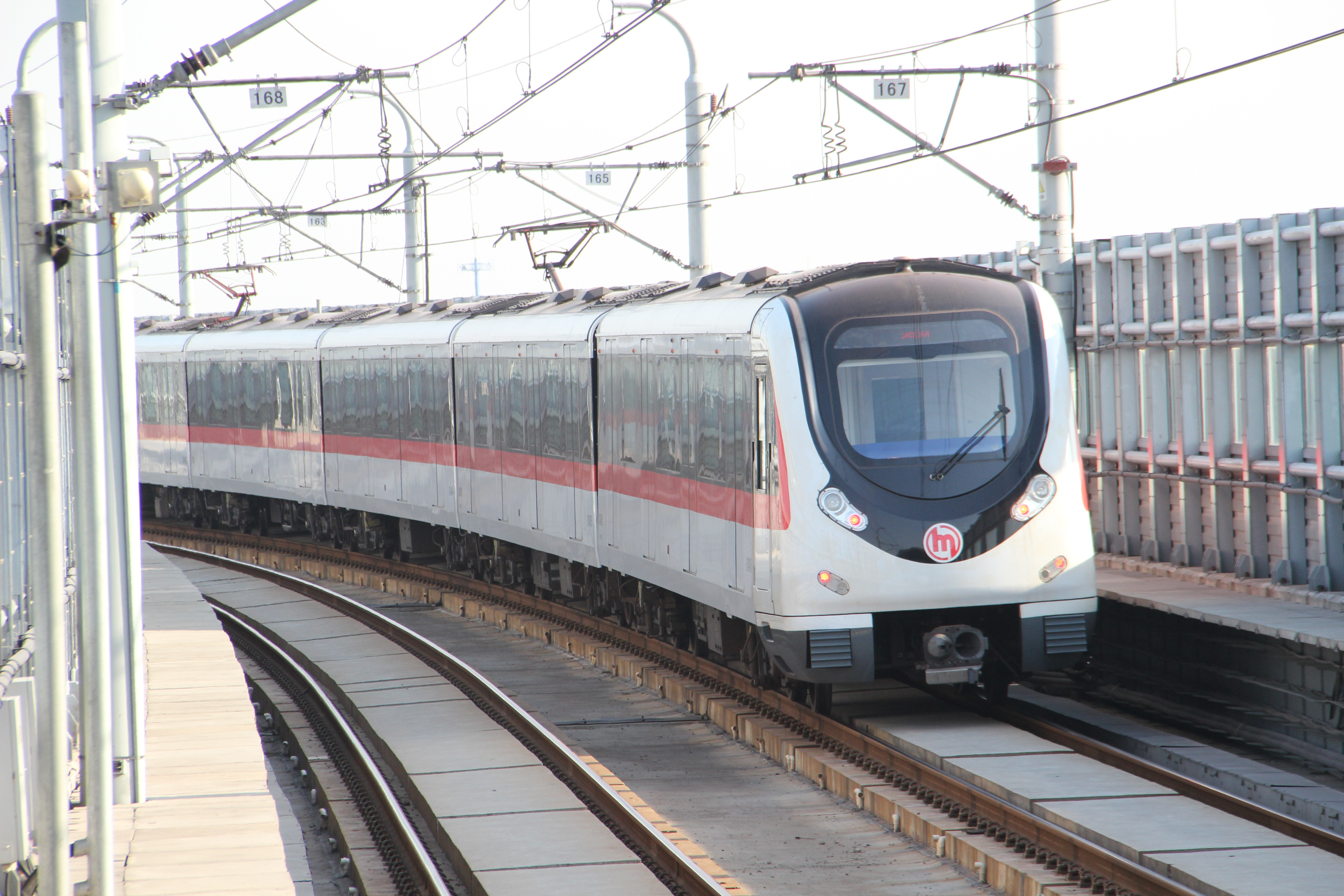
Hangzhou Metro Line 1

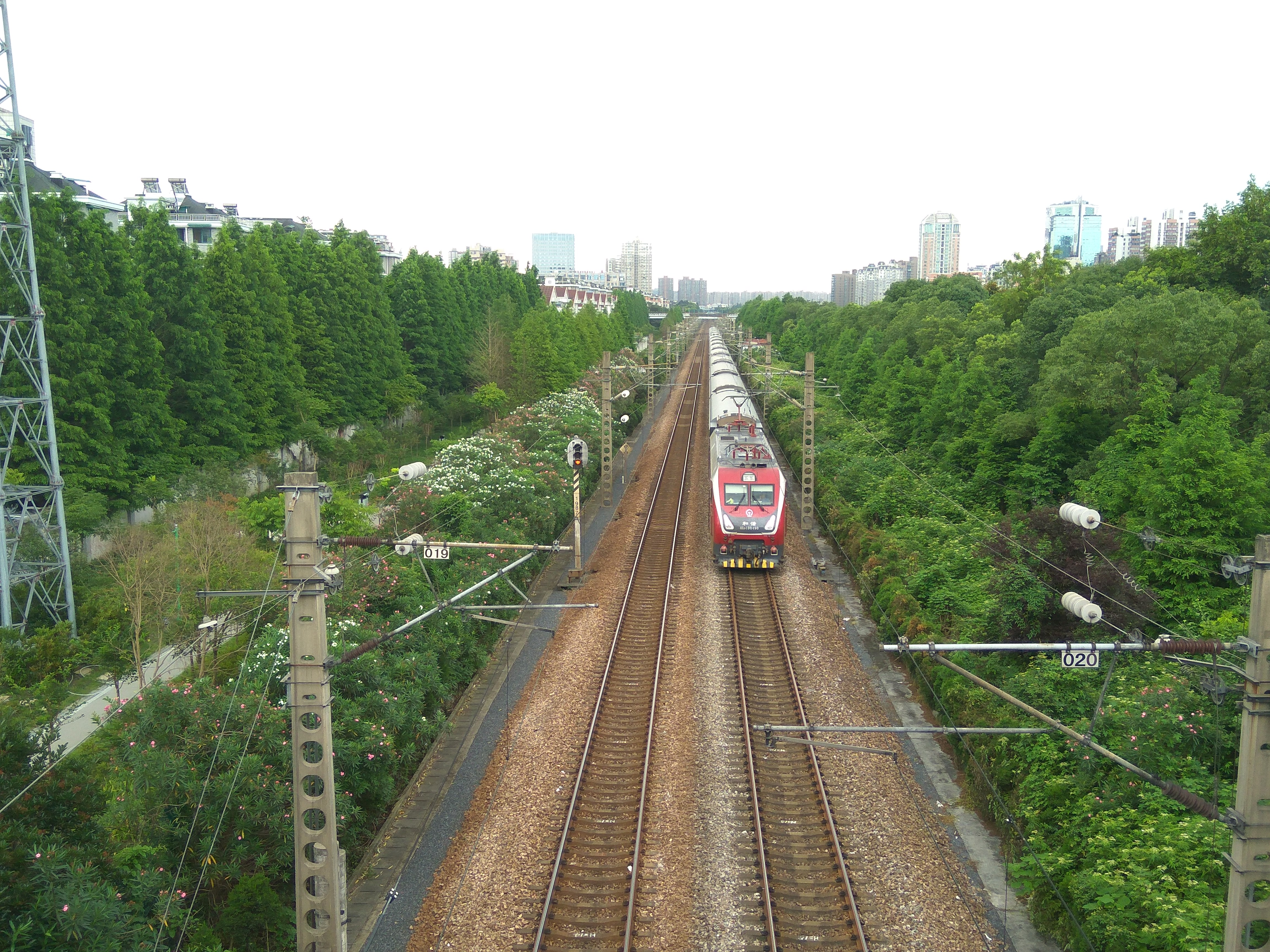
Shanghai-Hangzhou Railway (Original route to Hangzhou Station)

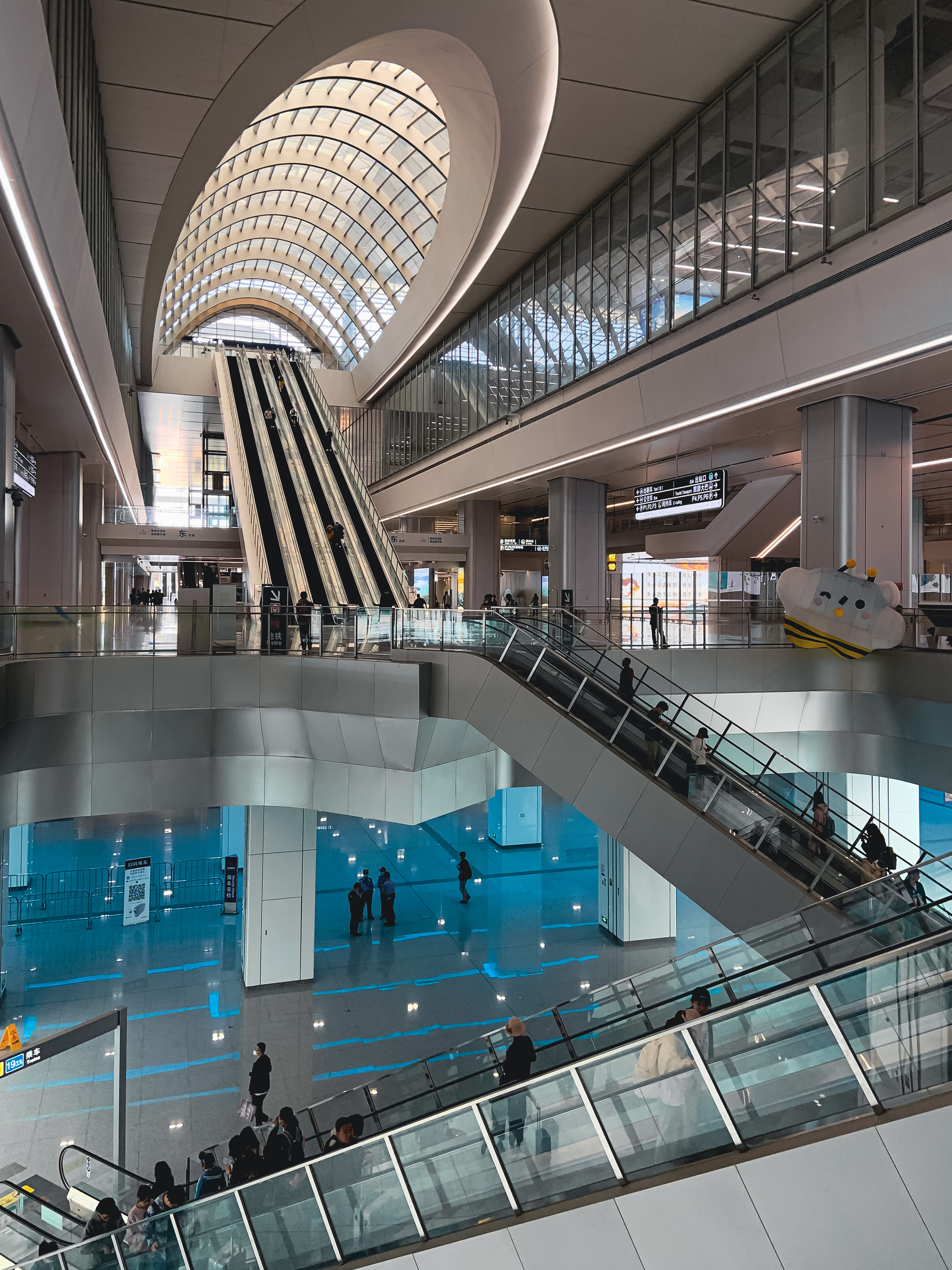
Hangzhou West railway station

=== Cycle hire ===
Bicycles and electric scooters are very popular, and major streets have dedicated bike lanes throughout the city. Hangzhou has an extensive public bike rental system called the Hangzhou Public Bicycle system. There is a dock-and-station system like those of Paris or London and users can hire bicycles with IC card or mobile phone application. Journeys within 60 minutes are free of charge.

=== Railways ===
Hangzhou sits on the intersecting point of some of the busiest rail corridors in China. The city's main station is Hangzhou East station (colloquially "East Station" 东站). It is one of the biggest rail traffic hubs in China, consisting of 15 platforms that house the High Speed services to Shanghai, Nanjing, Changsha, Ningbo, and beyond. The metro station beneath the rail complex building is a stop along the Hangzhou Metro Line 1 and Line 4. There are frequent departures for Shanghai with approximately 20-minute headways from 6:00 to 21:00. Non-stop CRH high-speed service between Hangzhou and Shanghai takes 50 minutes and leaves every hour (excluding a few early morning/late night departures) from both directions. Other CRH high-speed trains that stop at one or more stations along the route complete the trip in 59 to 75 minutes. Most other major cities in China can also be reached by direct train service from Hangzhou. The Hangzhou railway station (colloquially the "City Station" Chinese: 城站) was closed for renovation in mid 2013 but has recently opened again.

A second high-speed rail channel through Hangzhou is operational along with another major station, Hangzhou West, opened on September 22, 2022.

Direct trains link Hangzhou with more than 50 main cities, including 12 daily services to Beijing and more than 100 daily services to Shanghai; they reach as far as Ürümqi. The China Railway High-Speed service inaugurated on October 26, 2010. The service is operated by the CRH 380A(L), CRH 380B(L) and CRH380CL train sets which travel at a maximum speed of 350 km/h (220 mph), shortening the duration of the 202 km (126 mi) trip to only 45 minutes.

=== Air and sea ===
Hangzhou is served by the Hangzhou Xiaoshan International Airport, which provides direct service to many international destinations such as Thailand, Japan, South Korea, Malaysia, Vietnam, Singapore, Netherlands, Qatar, Portugal and the United States, as well as regional routes to Hong Kong, Taiwan, and Macau. It has an extensive domestic route network within the PRC and is consistently ranked top 10 in passenger traffic among Chinese airports.

The Port of Hangzhou is a small river port with a cargo throughput that exceeds 100 million tons annually.

== Education and research ==
Hangzhou is a major city for education and scientific research in China and Asia, ranking 6th in the Asia-Oceania region and 10th globally by the Nature Index as of 2025. Hangzhou hosts many universities, most notably Zhejiang University, one of the world's top 50th comprehensive public research universities and a member of the C9 League, an alliance of elite Chinese universities offering comprehensive and leading education.

Hangzhou has a large student population, with college towns such as Xiasha (下沙高教园区) [zh], located near the east end of the city, and Xiaoheshan, located near the west end of the city. Universities in Hangzhou include China Academy of Art, China Jiliang University, Communication University of Zhejiang, Hangzhou City University (also known as Zhejiang University City College), Hangzhou Dianzi University, Hangzhou Medical College, Hangzhou Normal University, Westlake University, Zhejiang A&F University, Zhejiang Chinese Medical University, Zhejiang Gongshang University, Zhejiang International Studies University (also known as Zhejiang Education Institute), Zhejiang Normal University, Zhejiang Sci-Tech University, Zhejiang University, Zhejiang University of Science and Technology, Zhejiang University of Technology, and Zhongfa Aviation Institute of Beihang University.

Provincial key public high schools in Hangzhou include Hangzhou No. 2 High School, Hangzhou Xuejun High School, Hangzhou High School, Hangzhou No. 14 High School, Hangzhou No. 4 High School, High School Attached to Zhejiang University, The Affiliated High School to Hangzhou Normal University, and Hangzhou Foreign Language School.

Private high schools in Hangzhou include Dingwen Academy Hangzhou, Hangzhou Green Town Yuhua School, Hangzhou Chinese International School, Hangzhou International School and Hangzhou Japanese School (杭州日本人学校) (nihonjin gakkō).

== International relations ==
Hangzhou is twinned with:

City	Division	Country	Since
Sayama	Saitama Prefecture	Japan	1978
Gifu	Gifu Prefecture	Japan	1979
Weert	Limburg	Netherlands	Unknown
Boston	Massachusetts	United States	1982
Baguio	N/A	Philippines	1982
Leeds	West Yorkshire	United Kingdom	1988
Fukui	Fukui Prefecture	Japan	1989
Nice	Provence-Alpes-Côte d'Azur	France	1994
Galway	County Galway	Ireland	1996
Paramaribo	Paramaribo District	Suriname	1988
Budapest	N/A	Hungary	1999
Cape Town	Western Cape	South Africa	2005
Oviedo	Principado de Asturias	Spain	2006
Curitiba	Paraná	Brazil	2007
Dresden	Saxony	Germany	2009
Indianapolis	Indiana	United States	2009
Oulu	Northern Ostrobothnia	Finland	2011
Atlanta	Georgia	United States	2012
Hamamatsu	Shizuoka Prefecture	Japan	2012
Lugano	Ticino	Switzerland	2012
Dnipro	Dnipropetrovsk Oblast	Ukraine	2013
El Calafate	Santa Cruz	Argentina	2013
Split	Split-Dalmatia County	Croatia	2014
Queenstown	Otago	New Zealand	2015
Maribor	City Municipality of Maribor	Slovenia	2017
Greenwich, Connecticut	Connecticut	United States	2017
Heidelberg	Baden-Württemberg	Germany	2018
Kota Kinabalu	Sabah	Malaysia	2019
Hanoi	Hanoi	Vietnam	2023
Isfahan	Isfahan Province	Iran	2024
Tallinn	Harju County	Estonia	Unknown
Middlesbrough	North Yorkshire	United Kingdom	Unknown

== Notable people of Hangzhou ==
- Colin Huang 黄峥, co-founder of Temu

== See also ==
- Historical capitals of China
- Jiangnan
- List of cities in the People's Republic of China by population
- Suzhou numerals – in the Unicode standard version 3.0, these characters are incorrectly named Hangzhou style numerals
- Chinese destroyer Hangzhou
- Regent International Center
- New first-tier city

== Notes ==
Preceded by Kaifeng	Capital of China (as Lin'an); 1127–1279	Succeeded by Dadu (present Beijing)
