= List of universities and colleges in Zhejiang =

Below is the List of Universities and Colleges in Zhejiang. As of April 2018, there were 108 higher education institutions and 9 continuing education institutions. As part of the Chinese education system, most universities and colleges in Zhejiang are public universities founded and run by the government, except for 36 private universities and colleges.

== Military academies ==
The Chinese People's Armed Police runs two academies in Zhejiang. People's Armed Police were part of the Ministry of Public Security, until it came under the Central Military Commission in January 2018. The China Coast Guard came under the Chinese People's Armed Police in July 2018. Since then, the two affiliated universities became part of the military system.

Name	Chinese name	Part of	Military rank	Location
China Coast Guard Academy (Formerly Public Security Maritime Police Academy)	中国人民武装警察部队海警学院	Chinese People's Armed Police Force	Deputy Army	Ningbo
Chinese People’s Armed Police Force Non-commissioned Officer School	中国人民武装警察部队士官学校	Chinese People's Armed Police Force	Division	Hangzhou

== Public universities ==
=== Directly supervised by the central government ===
The University of International Relations is a public university based in Beijing, under the Ministry of State Security. It was a National Key University. Its Hangzhou campus used to be Zhejiang Second Police College under the Ministry of State Security since 1983 before it was made the Hangzhou campus of the university in 1997. The campus has been training Tibetan students since 1983 and only recruits Tibetan students who are tested in Chinese in the National College Entrance Exam.

Zhejiang University was selected into China's national plan to develop first-class universities, namely Project 211, Project 985 and Double First Class University Plan, in 1995, 1999 and 2017, respectively. It was also a National Key University. As a university in the first batch of Project 985 universities, Zhejiang University is a member of C9 League. In 2000, Zhejiang University was made under the direct supervision of the Ministry of Education. The party secretary and president of Zhejiang University are regarded as vice ministerial government officials, whose nomination and approval are made by the Central People's Government and the Central Committee of the Chinese Communist Party. The university's Communist Party Committee and Commission for Discipline Inspection are under the Central Committee of the Chinese Communist Party and the Central Commission for Discipline Inspection respectively.

Name	Chinese name	National co-founder	Local co-founder	Location
Zhejiang University	浙江大学	Ministry of Education	People's Government of Zhejiang Province	Mainly in Hangzhou, with campuses in Haining, Zhoushan and Ningbo
University of International Relations	国际关系学院	Ministry of State Security, Ministry of Education	None	Mainly in Beijing, with a campus in Hangzhou

=== Co-founded by local and central governments ===
==== Degree education ====
Name	Chinese name	National co-founder	Local co-founder	Location
China Academy of Art	中国美术学院	Ministry of Education, Ministry of Culture and Tourism	Department of Education of Zhejiang Province	Hangzhou
Ningbo University	宁波大学	Ministry of Education	People's Government of Zhejiang Province, Ningbo Municipal People's Government	Ningbo
Zhejiang University of Technology	浙江工业大学	Ministry of Education	People's Government of Zhejiang Province	Hangzhou
Zhejiang Gongshang University	浙江工商大学	Ministry of Education, Ministry of Commerce	People's Government of Zhejiang Province	Hangzhou
Zhejiang Ocean University	浙江海洋大学	Ministry of Natural Resources	People's Government of Zhejiang Province	Zhoushan
Zhejiang A & F University	浙江农林大学	National Forestry and Grassland Administration	People's Government of Zhejiang Province	Hangzhou
Wenzhou Medical University	温州医科大学	National Health Commission, Ministry of Education	People's Government of Zhejiang Province	Wenzhou
Zhejiang Chinese Medical University	浙江中医药大学	National Administration of Traditional Chinese Medicine, Ministry of Education	People's Government of Zhejiang Province	Hangzhou
Hangzhou Dianzi University	杭州电子科技大学	State Administration for Science, Technology and Industry for National Defense	People's Government of Zhejiang Province	Hangzhou
China Jiliang University	中国计量大学	State Administration for Market Regulation	People's Government of Zhejiang Province	Hangzhou
Communication University of Zhejiang	浙江传媒学院	National Radio and Television Administration	People's Government of Zhejiang Province	Hangzhou
Zhejiang Conservatory of Music	浙江音乐学院	Ministry of Culture and Tourism	People's Government of Zhejiang Province	Hangzhou
Zhejiang Institute of Water Resources and Hydropower	浙江水利水电学院	Ministry of Water Resources	People's Government of Zhejiang Province	Hangzhou

==== Vocational education ====
Name	Chinese name	National co-founder	Local co-founder	City
Zhejiang Institute of Economics and Trade	浙江经贸职业技术学院	All China Federation of Supply and Marketing Cooperatives	People's Government of Zhejiang Province	Hangzhou
Zhejiang Police Vocational Academy	浙江警官职业学院	Ministry of Justice	People's Government of Zhejiang Province	Hangzhou
Tourism College of Zhejiang	浙江旅游职业学院	Ministry of Culture and Tourism	People's Government of Zhejiang Province	Hangzhou

=== Other provincial universities and colleges ===
Name	Chinese name	Type	Location
Hangzhou Normal University	杭州师范大学	Degree education	Hangzhou
Zhejiang University of Science and Technology	浙江科技学院	Degree education	Hangzhou
Zhejiang University City College	浙大城市学院	Degree education	Hangzhou
Zhejiang University of Water Resources and Electric Power	浙江水利水电学院	Degree education	Hangzhou
Zhejiang University of Finance and Economics	浙江财经大学	Degree education	Hangzhou
Zhejiang Police College	浙江警官学院	Degree education	Hangzhou
Hangzhou Medical College	杭州医学院	Degree education	Hangzhou
Zhejiang International Studies University	浙江外国语学院	Degree education	Hangzhou
Zhejiang Sci-Tech University	浙江理工大学	Degree education	Hangzhou
Zhejiang University of Finance and Economics	浙江财经大学	Degree education	Hangzhou
Zhejiang University of Science and Technology	浙江科技学院	Degree education	Hangzhou
Zhejiang Institute of Communications	浙江交通职业技术学院	Vocational education	Hangzhou
Zhejiang Financial College	浙江金融职业学院	Vocational education	Hangzhou
Zhejiang Vocational College of Commerce	浙江商业职业技术学院	Vocational education	Hangzhou
Zhejiang Institute of Mechanical and Electrical Engineering	浙江机电职业技术学院	Vocational education	Hangzhou
Zhejiang College of Construction	浙江建设职业技术学院	Vocational education	Hangzhou
Zhejiang Technical Institute of Economics	浙江经济职业技术学院	Vocational education	Hangzhou
Zhejiang Vocational Academy of Art	浙江艺术职业学院	Vocational education	Hangzhou
Hangzhou Vocational and Technical College	杭州职业技术学院	Vocational education	Hangzhou
Professional and Technological College of Zhejiang Electric Power	浙江电力职业技术学院	Vocational education	Hangzhou
Zhejiang College of Sports	浙江体育职业技术学院	Vocational education	Hangzhou
Zhejiang Tongji Vocational College of Science and Technology	浙江同济科技职业学院	Vocational education	Hangzhou
Hangzhou Polytechnic	杭州科技职业技术学院	Vocational education	Hangzhou
Zhejiang Vocational College of Special Education	浙江特殊教育职业学院	Vocational education	Hangzhou
Zhejiang Open University	浙江开放大学	Continuing education	Hangzhou
Hangzhou Workers Part-time University	杭州市工人业余大学	Continuing education	Hangzhou
Zhejiang Provincial Level Organ Staff Part-time University	浙江省省级机关职工业余大学	Continuing education	Hangzhou
Zhejiang Staff University of Economics and Management	浙江经济管理职工大学	Continuing education	Hangzhou
NingboTech University	浙大宁波理工学院	Degree education	Ningbo
Ningbo University of Technology	宁波工程学院	Degree education	Ningbo
Zhejiang Wanli University	浙江万里学院	Degree education	Ningbo
Zhejiang Pharmaceutical University	浙江药科职业大学	Professional education, degree education	Ningbo
Zhejiang Business Technology Institute	浙江工商职业技术学院	Vocational education	Ningbo
Ningbo Polytechnic	宁波职业技术学院	Vocational education	Ningbo
Zhejiang Fashion Institute of Technology	浙江纺织服装职业技术学院	Vocational education	Ningbo
Ningbo Childhood Education College	宁波幼儿师范高等专科学校 (宁波教育学院)	Vocational education, continuing education	Ningbo
Ningbo City College of Vocational Technology	宁波城市职业技术学院	Vocational education	Ningbo
Ningbo College of Health Sciences	宁波卫生职业技术学院	Vocational education	Ningbo
Ningbo Open University	宁波开放大学	Continuing education	Ningbo
Wenzhou University	温州大学	Degree education	Wenzhou
Wenzhou Institute of Technology	温州理工学院	Degree education	Wenzhou
Zhejiang Industry and Trade Polytechnic	浙江工贸职业技术学院	Vocational education	Wenzhou
Zhejiang College of Security Technology	浙江安防职业技术学院	Vocational education	Wenzhou
Wenzhou Vocational and Technical College	温州职业技术学院	Vocational education	Wenzhou
Wenzhou Vocational College of Science & Technology	温州科技职业学院	Vocational education	Wenzhou
City University of Wenzhou (Wenzhou Open University, Wenzhou Workers Spare-time College)	温州城市大学 (温州开放大学、温州市工人业余大学)	Continuing education	Wenzhou
Jiaxing University	嘉兴学院	Degree education	Jiaxing
Jiaxing Nanhu University	嘉兴南湖学院	Degree education	Jiaxing
Jiaxing Vocational and Technical College	嘉兴职业技术学院	Vocational education	Jiaxing
Jiaxing Education College	嘉兴教育学院	Continuing education	Jiaxing
Huzhou University	湖州师范学院	Degree education	Huzhou
Huzhou College	湖州学院	Degree education	Huzhou
Huzhou Vocational and Technical College	湖州职业技术学院	Vocational education	Huzhou
Shaoxing University	绍兴文理学院	Degree education	Shaoxing
Zhejiang Agricultural Business College	浙江农业商贸职业学院	Vocational education	Shaoxing
Zhejiang Industry Polytechnic College	浙江工业职业技术学院	Vocational education	Shaoxing
Zhejiang Post and Telecommunication College	浙江邮电职业技术学院	Vocational education	Shaoxing
Zhejiang Normal University	浙江师范大学	Degree education	Jinhua
Jinhua Vocational and Technical College	金华职业技术学院	Vocational education	Jinhua
Yiwu Industrial and Commercial College	义乌工商职业技术学院	Vocational education	Yiwu, Jinhua
Jinhua Education College	金华教育学院	Continuing education	Jinhua
Quzhou University	衢州学院	Degree education	Quzhou
Quzhou Vocational and Technical College	衢州职业技术学院	Vocational education	Quzhou
Zhejiang International Maritime College	浙江国际海运职业技术学院	Vocational education	Zhoushan
Zhoushan Tourism and Health College	浙江舟山群岛新区旅游与健康职业学院	Vocational education	Zhoushan
Taizhou University	台州学院	Degree education	Taizhou
Taizhou Vocational and Technical College	台州职业技术学院	Vocational education	Taizhou
Taizhou Vocational College of Science and Technology	台州科技职业学院	Vocational education	Taizhou
Lishui University	丽水学院	Degree education	Lishui
Lishui Vocational College of Science and Technology	丽水职业技术学院	Vocational education	Lishui

== Private universities ==
=== Degree education ===
Name	Chinese name	Founder	Location	Notes
Westlake University (Formerly Westlake Institute for Advanced)	西湖大学	Westlake Education Foundation	Hangzhou	Non-degree awarding itself, but award joint degrees with Zhejiang University and Fudan University
Zhejiang Shuren University	浙江树人学院	Zhejiang Provincial Political Consultative Committee	Hangzhou and Shaoxing	
Zhejiang Yuexiu University of Foreign Languages	浙江越秀外国语学院	New Harmony Union (NHU) Holding Group	Shaoxing	
Ningbo University of Finance and Economics (Formerly Ningbo Dahongying University)	宁波财经学院	Ningbo Dahongying Economics & Trade	Ningbo	
Wenzhou Business College	温州商学院	Wenzhou Wenbo Investment and Development	Wenzhou	

==== Independent colleges ====
Independent colleges are the private sector of public universities, which offers for-profit degree education for those who are not admitted to public universities. They were first set up in Zhejiang as a business model since the 1990s, yet a national reform has aimed to transform them into vocational or private universities independent of their affiliated universities since 2019. For example, Zhejiang University City College and Ningbo Institute of Technology, Zhejiang University were transformed into public universities, with the latter renamed as NingboTech University. The reform led to students' protests in 2021, after which the government suspended the reform. In Zhejiang, the reforms for Hangzhou Dianzi University Information Engineering School, Zhejiang Gongshang University Hangzhou College of Commerce, Zhijiang College of Zhejiang University of Technology had since been suspended.

Name	Chinese name	Part of	Location
Hangzhou Dianzi University Information Engineering School	杭州电子科技大学信息工程学院	Hangzhou Dianzi University	Lin'an, Hangzhou
Hangzhou Normal University Qianjiang College	杭州师范大学钱江学院	Hangzhou Normal University	Hangzhou
Zhejiang Chinese Medical University Binjiang Institute	浙江中医药大学滨江学院	Zhejiang Chinese Medical University	Hangzhou
Zhejiang Gongshang University Hangzhou College of Commerce	浙江工商大学杭州商学院	Zhejiang Gongshang University	Tonglu, Hangzhou
College of Science and Technology, Ningbo University	宁波大学科学技术学院	Ningbo University	Cixi, Ningbo
Wenzhou Medical University Renii College	温州医科大学仁济学院	Wenzhou Medical University	Dongtou, Wenzhou
Tongji Zhejiang College	同济大学浙江学院	Tongji University	Jiaxing
Oriental Institute of Zhejiang University of Finance and Economics	浙江财经大学东方学院	Zhejiang University of Finance and Economics	Haining, Jiaxing
Zhijiang College of Zhejiang University of Technology	浙江工业大学之江学院	Zhejiang University of Technology	Shaoxing
College of Technology and Art of Zhejiang Sci-Tech University	浙江理工大学技术与艺术学院	Zhejiang Sci-Tech University	Shaoxing
Shaoxing University Yuanpei College	绍兴文理学院元培书院	Shaoxing University	Shaoxing
Jiyang College of Zhejiang Agriculture and Forestry University	浙江农林大学暨阳学院	Zhejiang Agriculture and Forestry University	Shaoxing
Zhejiang Normal University Xingzhi College	浙江师范大学行知书院	Zhejiang Normal University	Jinhua
Shanghai University of Finance and Economics Zhejiang College	上海财经大学浙江学院	Shanghai University of Finance and Economics	Jinhua
China Jiliang University College of Modern Science and Technology	中国计量大学现代科技学院	China Jiliang University	Yiwu, Jinhua

==== Sino-foreign joint universities ====
Name	Chinese name	Local partner	International partner	Location
University of Nottingham Ningbo China	宁波诺丁汉大学	Wanli Education Group	University of Nottingham, England	Ningbo
Wenzhou-Kean University	温州肯恩大学	Wenzhou University	Kean University, New Jersey, United States	Wenzhou
Zhongfa Aviation University	中法航空大学	Beihang University	Ecole Nationale de l'Aviation Civile, France	Hangzhou

=== Vocational education ===
Name	Chinese name	Founder	Location
Zhejiang Yuying College of Vocational and Technology	浙江育英职业技术学院	Zhejiang Yuying Education Group	Hangzhou
Zhejiang Changzheng Vocational and Technical College	浙江长征职业技术学院	Revolutionary Committee Of The Chinese Kuomintang Zhejiang Committee	Hangzhou
Hangzhou Wanxiang Polytechnic	杭州万向职业技术学院	Wanxiang Group	Hangzhou
Zhejiang Dongfang Polytechnic	浙江东方职业技术学院	Wenzhou Modern Group	Wenzhou
Jiaxing Nanyang Polytechnic Institute	嘉兴南洋职业技术学院	Shanghai Jiao Da Education Group	Jiaxing
Zhejiang Yuxiang Vocational and Technical College	浙江宇翔职业技术学院	Shangshu Education Group	Anji, Huzhou
Shaoxing Vocational and Technical College	绍兴职业技术学院	Sichuan Top Group	Shaoxing
Zhejiang Guangsha Construction Vocational and Technical College	浙江广厦建设职业技术大学	Dongkong Education and Technology Co. Ltd. (东阳市东控教育科技有限公司)	Dongyang, Jinhua
Zhejiang Hengdian College of Film & Television	浙江横店影视职业学院	Hengdian Group	Dongyang, Jinhua
Zhejiang Jinhua Technology and Trade Polytechnic	浙江科贸职业技术学院	Zhejiang Dachang Education and Development Co., Ltd. (浙江大昌教育发展有限公司)	Jinhua

== Historical universities ==
Name	Chinese name	Time	Location	Notes
Hangchow University Hangchow Christian College	私立之江大学	1897-1952	Hangzhou	Incorporated into Zhejiang University and Hangzhou University in 1952.
National Yingshi University Zhejiang Wartime University	国立英士大学 省立英士大学 省立浙江战时大学	1928-1950	Wenzhou Taizhou Jinhua Lishui	Incorporated into Zhejiang University and Fudan University in 1950
National Southeastern Associated University	国立东南联合大学	1942-1943	Jinhua	Incorporated into National Yingshi University and National Jinan University in June 1943
Hangzhou University Hangzhou Teachers College	杭州大学 杭州师范学院	1952-1998	Hangzhou	Incorporated into Zhejiang University in 1998
Zhejiang Medical University Zhejiang Medical College	浙江医科大学 浙江医学院	1952-1998	Hangzhou	Incorporated into Zhejiang University in 1998
Zhejiang Agricultural University Zhejiang Agricultural College	浙江农业大学 浙江农学院	1952-1998	Hangzhou	Incorporated into Zhejiang University in 1998

== Summary ==
=== By university town ===
Following the foreign concept of the university town and the proposal by China Association for Promoting Democracy's Ningbo committee, the Ningbo Higher Education Park was built in 1999–2000 as the first higher education park in China. Since then, similar parks have been built in Zhejiang. Currently, the largest one is the Xiasha Higher Education Park, also named Qiantang Science Town, which is home to 14 higher education institutions and 200 thousand students. Below is the full list of the universities according to their university towns.

- Ningbo Higher Education Park (South), Ningbo:
  1. Zhejiang Wanli University
  2. Zhejiang University (Ningbo Campus)
  3. NingboTech University
  4. University of Nottingham Ningbo China
  5. Ningbo College of Health Sciences
  6. Ningbo City College of Vocational Technology
  7. Zhejiang Pharmaceutical University
- Ningbo Higher Education Park (North), Ningbo:
  1. Ningbo University
  2. College of Science and Technology, Ningbo University
  3. Ningbo University of Technology
  4. Zhejiang Fashion Institute of Technology
- Xiasha Higher Education Park, Hangzhou:
  1. Zhejiang University of Finance and Economics
  2. Zhejiang Gongshang University
  3. Hangzhou Normal University
  4. Hangzhou Dianzi University
  5. Zhejiang Sci-Tech University
  6. China Jiliang University
  7. Communication University of Zhejiang
  8. Zhejiang University of Water Resources and Electric Power
  9. Zhejiang Financial College
  10. Zhejiang Institute of Economics and Trade
  11. Zhejiang Technical Institute of Economics
  12. Zhejiang Police Vocational Academy
  13. Hangzhou Vocational and Technical College
  14. Zhejiang Yuying College of Vocational and Technology
- Xiaoheshan Higher Education Park, Hangzhou:
  1. Zhejiang University of Technology
  2. Zhejiang University of Science and Technology
  3. Zhejiang International Studies University
  4. Zhejiang Changzheng Vocational and Technical College
- Binjiang Higher Education Park, Hangzhou:
  1. Zhejiang Chinese Medical University
  2. Zhejiang Police College
  3. Hangzhou Medical School
  4. Zhejiang Changzheng Vocational and Technical College
  5. Zhejiang Vocational College of Commerce
  6. Zhejiang Vocational Academy of Art
- Xiaoshan Higher Education Park, Hangzhou:
  1. Zhejiang Normal University
  2. Zhejiang College of Sports
  3. Zhejiang Tongji Vocational College of Science and Technology
  4. Tourism College of Zhejiang
  5. Zhejiang College of Construction
- Wenzhou Higher Education Mega Center, Wenzhou
  1. Wenzhou Medical University
  2. Wenzhou University
  3. Wenzhou Medical University Renji College
  4. Wenzhou Vocational and Technical College
  5. Wenzhou Business College
  6. Wenzhou-Kean University

=== By engagement in national higher education plans ===
Name	National Key Universities (1959–1993)	Project 211 (1995–2015)	Project 985 (1998–2015)	Plan 111 (2006–present)	Double First Class (2015–present)
Zhejiang University (Note: Hangzhou University and Zhejiang Agricultural University were merged into Zhejiang University in 1998.)	Yes (since 1963)	Yes (since 1996)	Yes (since 1998)	Yes	Yes (Note: The Double First Class subjects at Zhejiang University are chemistry, biology, ecology, mechanical engineering, optical engineering, materials science, electrical engineering, control science and engineering, computer science and technology, agricultural engineering, environmental science and engineering, software engineering, horticulture, plant protection, basic medicine, pharmacy, management science and engineering, agricultural and forestry economic management.)
Hangzhou University		Yes (since 1996)			
Zhejiang Agricultural University		Yes (since 1996)			
University of International Relations	Yes (since 1964) (Note: The Hangzhou campus of the University of International Relations started operation in 1998.)				
China Academy of Art					Yes (Note: The Double First Class subject at China Academy of Art is fine arts.)
Ningbo University				Yes	Yes (Note: The Double First Class subject at Ningbo University is mechanics.)
Zhejiang University of Technology				Yes	
Zhejiang Normal University				Yes	
Wenzhou Medical University				Yes	
Zhejiang A & F University				Yes	
Hangzhou Dianzi University				Yes	

=== By academic disciplines ranking ===
Name	A+ (top 2%)	A (2-5 percentile)	A- (5-10 percentile)	B+ (10-20 percentile)	B (20-30 percentile)	B- (30-40 percentile)	C+ (40-50 percentile)	C (50-60 percentile)	C- (60-70 percentile)
Zhejiang University	Ecology; Optical Engineering; Control Science and Engineering; Computer Science and Technology; Agricultural Engineering; Software Engineering; Horticulture science; Agricultural Resource and Environment Sciences; Plant protection; Clinical Medicine	Chinese Language and Literature; Foreign Language and Literatures; Mechanical Engineering; Materials Science and Engineering; Power Engineering and Engineering Thermophysics; Civil Engineering; Chemical Engineering and Technology; Environmental Science and Engineering; Management Science and Engineering; Pharmaceutical Science; Public Administration	Theoretical Economics; Theory of Marxism; Science of Law; Education; Mathematics; Physics; Chemistry; Biology; Electrical Engineering; Electronic Science and Technology; Biomedical Engineering; Food Science and Engineering; Animal Science; Crop Science; Basic Medicine; Business Administration; Design	Philosophy; Applied Economics; Psychology; Physical Education and Sport Science; Journalism and Communication; Mechanics; Information and Communication Engineering; Architecture; Nursing	Sociology; Archaeology; History of the World; Veterinary Medicine; Stomatology; Public Health and Preventive Medicine	History of China; Marine Science	Geology		Naval Architecture and Ocean Engineering; Aerospace Science and Technology
Zhejiang Normal University				Education; Mathematics; Chinese Language and Literature	Theory of Marxism	Foreign Language and Literatures; Psychology; Software Engineering; Business Administration; Music and Dance; Fine Art	Sociology; Computer Science and Technology; Physical Education and Sport Science; Physics; Chemistry; Biology	History of the World; Politics	Ecology; History of China
Zhejiang University of Finance and Economics				Applied Economics	Business Administration	Public Administration	Statistics	Theoretical Economics	Science of Law
Zhejiang Gongshang University			Statistics	Business Administration; Applied Economics	Foreign Language and Literatures; Food Science and Engineering	Science of Law; Computer Science and Technology	Public Administration; Theory of Marxism	Information and Communication Engineering; Environmental Science and Engineering; Management Science and Engineering	
Zhejiang Sci-Tech University					Textile Science and Engineering; Mechanical Engineering	Art Theory	Theory of Marxism; Computer Science and Technology; Software Engineering; Mathematics	Chemistry; Biology; Materials Science and Engineering; Management Science and Engineering; Applied Economics	Control Science and Engineering
China Academy of Art	Fine Art; Design		Art Theory	Drama Film and Television					
Ningbo University					Foreign Language and Literature; Fisheries	Information and Communication Engineering; Mathematics; Physical Education and Sport Science	Applied Economics; Science of Law; Education	Physics; Mechanics; Civil Engineering; Food Science and Engineering	Chemistry; Theory of Marxism
Zhejiang University of Technology			Chemical Engineering and Technology	Business Administration; Mechanical Engineering	Control Science and Engineering; Computer Science and Technology; Environmental Science and Engineering; Software Engineering; Pharmaceutical Science	Design; Applied Economics	Physics; Materials Science and Engineering; Power Engineering and Engineering Thermophysics; Civil Engineering; Food Science and Engineering	Management Science and Engineering; Information and Communication Engineering; Education; Chinese Language and Literature; Mathematics	
Hangzhou Normal University					Foreign Language and Literatures; Art Theory	Fine Art; Education; Biology; Public Administration	Theory of Marxism; Chemistry; Ecology; Chinese Language and Literature; Mathematics	Physics; Psychology	Physical Education and Sport Science; History of China; Nursing; Science of Law
Wenzhou University						Theory of Marxism	Computer Science and Technology; Education; Mathematics; Chemistry	Chinese Language and Literature	
Zhejiang A & F University				Science of Forest	Landscape Architecture		Forestry Engineering; Ecology; Agricultural Resource and Environment Sciences	Biology	Economics and Management of Agriculture and Forestry
Hangzhou Dianzi University				Computer Science and Technology; Electronic Science and Technology; Control Science and Engineering		Business Administration	Mechanical Engineering; Software Engineering; Management Science and Engineering	Information and Communication Engineering	
China Jiliang University					Instrumentation Science and Technology	Optical Engineering; Control Science and Engineering	Management Science and Engineering	Biology; Materials Science and Engineering	Electronic Science and Technology
Wenzhou Medical University						Clinical Medicine; Pharmaceutical Science	Biology; Biomedical Engineering	Chinese Materia Medica; Nursing	Basic Medicine; Stomatology
Zhejiang Chinese Medical University					Chinese Materia Medica; Chinese Medicine	The Integrative Medicine	Nursing; Pharmaceutical Science		Clinical Medicine
Zhejiang Ocean University							Fisheries		

== See also ==
- List of universities in China
- Higher education in China
