= Yang Fujia =

Chinese nuclear physicist (1936–2022)

- 杨福家

Chancellor of the University of Nottingham
- In office 4 July 2001 – 1 January 2013
- Preceded by: The Lord Dearing
- Succeeded by: Sir Andrew Witty

President of Fudan University
- In office November 1993 – December 1998
- Preceded by: Hua Zhongyi
- Succeeded by: Wang Shenghong

Personal details
- Born: 11 June 1936 Shanghai, China
- Died: 17 July 2022 (aged 86) Shanghai, China
- Party: Chinese Communist Party
- Education: Fudan University
- Scientific career
- Fields: Nuclear physics

Chinese name
- Simplified Chinese: 杨福家
- Traditional Chinese: 楊福家
Transcriptions
Standard Mandarin
- Hanyu Pinyin: Yáng Fújiā

Yang Fujia (Chinese: 杨福家; 11 June 1936 – 17 July 2022) was a Chinese nuclear physicist. He was an academician of the Chinese Academy of Sciences, a renowned nuclear physicist and a Chancellor of the University of Nottingham, England. He was President of the University of Nottingham Ningbo China (UNNC).

== Biography ==
Yang's ancestral hometown is Zhenhai, Zhejiang. He was born in Shanghai, graduated from Shanghai Gezhi High School and obtained a degree in physics from Fudan University. He was a lecturer and professor of physics at Fudan, serving as President of the university from 1994 to 1999.

Yang was Director of the Shanghai Institute of Nuclear Research of the Chinese Academy of Sciences from 1987 to 2001, was Chairman of the Shanghai Science and Technology Association (1992–1996), and he was the first president of the Association of University Presidents of China (1997–1999).

Yang has held visiting professorships at the Niels Bohr Institute in Denmark; Rutgers University, US; the State University of New York at Stony Brook, US; and the University of Tokyo, Japan. He held honorary degrees from Soka University of Japan, the State University of New York, the University of Hong Kong, the University of Nottingham, England; and the University of Connecticut, US.

Yang was installed as the University of Nottingham's sixth Chancellor on 4 July 2001, the first time that a Chinese academic has become Chancellor of a UK university. He stepped down on 1 January 2013 and was succeeded by Sir Andrew Witty.

In 2004, Yang was one of the 3 prime movers behind the creation of the University of Nottingham Ningbo China – along with Sir Colin Campbell and Madame Xu Yafen. He continued to hold the office of President at UNNC, presiding at Graduation Ceremonies and engaging closely with students who have followed Yang's original dream of moderating and reforming China's higher education circumstance.

Other roles which Professor Yang has held include:

- Council Member representing China on the Association of East Asia Research Universities
- Member of the International Association of University Presidents
- Member of the Association of University Presidents of the Pacific Rim
- Vice-president of the Chinese Association of Science and Technology
- Member of International Advisory Council in Universiti Tunku Abdul Rahman

Yang died in Shanghai on 17 July 2022 at the age of 86.

== Notable Research ==
- Maosheng, Li; Hongliang, Ma; Miaohua, Chen; Zhijun, Chen; Fuquan, Lu; Jiayong, Tang; Fujia, Yang (1 April 2000). "Hyperfine Structure Measurements in the Lines 576.91 nm, 597.11 nm and 612.61 nm of La II". Physica Scripta. 61 (4). IOP Publishing: 449–451. Bibcode:2000PhyS...61..449M. doi:10.1238/physica.regular.061a00449. ISSN 0031-8949. S2CID 250740327.
- Hongliang, Ma; Miaohua, Chen; Zhijun, Chen; Wei, Shi; Fuquan, Lu; Jiayong, Tang; Fujia, Yang (1 January 1999). "Hyperfine structure in the 576 nm line of Pr II by collinear fast-ion-beam laser spectroscopy". Journal of Physics B: Atomic, Molecular and Optical Physics. 32 (5). IOP Publishing: 1345–1349. Bibcode:1999JPhB...32.1345H. doi:10.1088/0953-4075/32/5/023. ISSN 0953-4075. S2CID 250908514.
- Chongyang, Chen; Shixiang, Yan; Zhouxuan, Teng; Yansen, Wang; Fujia, Yang; Yongsheng, Sun (28 December 1998). "Erratum: Electron-impact ionization cross sections and rates for ions of neon". Journal of Physics B: Atomic, Molecular and Optical Physics. 31 (24). IOP Publishing: 5403–5405. Bibcode:1998JPhB...31.5403C. doi:10.1088/0953-4075/31/24/023. ISSN 0953-4075.
- Chongyang, Chen; Shixiang, Yan; Zhouxuan, Teng; Yansen, Wang; Fujia, Yang; Yongsheng, Sun (28 June 1998). "Electron-impact ionization cross sections and rates for ions of neon". Journal of Physics B: Atomic, Molecular and Optical Physics. 31 (12). IOP Publishing: 2667–2679. Bibcode:1998JPhB...31.2667C. doi:10.1088/0953-4075/31/12/005. ISSN 0953-4075. S2CID 250895924.
- Hongliang, Ma; Wei, Shi; Bin, Yan; Yong, Li; Dufei, Fang; Fuquan, Lu; Jiayong, Tang; Fujia, Yang (14 August 1997). "Optical isotope shifts of Nd II by collinear fast-ion-beam laser spectroscopy". Journal of Physics B: Atomic, Molecular and Optical Physics. 30 (15). IOP Publishing: 3355–3360. Bibcode:1997JPhB...30.3355H. doi:10.1088/0953-4075/30/15/008. ISSN 0953-4075. S2CID 250873024.
- Weimin, Wu; Jian, Gu; Songmao, Wu; Fuquan, Lu; Fujia, Yang (1995). "Single Electron Capture for Ce^{+} and Ho^{+} in H_{2}". Chinese Physics Letters. 12 (1). IOP Publishing: 16–18. Bibcode:1995ChPhL..12...16W. doi:10.1088/0256-307x/12/1/005. ISSN 0256-307X. S2CID 250826902.
- Yansen, Wang; Fuquan, Lu; Songmao, Wy; Wei, Shi; Linggen, Song; Jiayong, Tang; Fujia, Yang (14 January 1991). "Configuration mixing of the level (23 537)^{o}_{9/2} in Nd II deduced from the optical isotope shifts by collinear fast-ion-beam laser spectroscopy". Journal of Physics B: Atomic, Molecular and Optical Physics. 24 (1). IOP Publishing: 45–48. Bibcode:1991JPhB...24...45Y. doi:10.1088/0953-4075/24/1/007. ISSN 0953-4075. S2CID 250889655.

Academic offices
Preceded by Hua Zhongyi	President of Fudan University; 1993–1998	Succeeded by Wang Shenghong
Preceded by The Lord Dearing	Chancellor of the University of Nottingham; 2000–2013	Succeeded by Sir Andrew Witty
