= Xu Yafen =

Xu Yafen (Chinese: 徐亚芬; pinyin: Xú Yàfēn) is a Chinese Communist Party (CCP) politician and university administrator. She is a member of the 11th CCP Conference of Zhejiang Province and chair of the board of the University of Nottingham Ningbo China, a partnership with the British University of Nottingham, and chair of the Chinese Zhejiang Wanli University. Xu is also a visiting professor at Tsinghua University and a research fellow at the Human Science Institute of the Chinese Academy of Management Science. In 2017 she was honoured by the University of Nottingham, who named a building at their Jubilee Campus after her.

== Biography ==
Xu joined the Chinese Communist Party (CCP) in 1981. She is a representative to the 11th CCP Conference of Zhejiang Province and a member of its Chinese People's Political Consultative Conference. Xu is a visiting professor at Tsinghua University and a research fellow at the Human Science Institute of the Chinese Academy of Management Science. She has published academic papers in the fields of psychology, behaviour science, management and education. She has been awarded an honorary degree by the University of Dundee.

Xu founded the Wanli Education Group (WEG) which contributed to reform of education in China and partnered with the British University of Nottingham to establish a British-style campus in China. The University of Nottingham Ningbo China (UNNC) was established in 2004 with £200 million of Chinese funding. A campus was constructed within eight months after which dozens of British staff were teaching courses to Chinese students in British-style small classes, using British textbooks. The project was part of a plan to keep Chinese students in the country and to retain their tuition fee spend. Xu stated that "we don't have to lose our best young people for them to get a famous degree and it has immeasurable advantages to our economy".

Degrees from UNNC are awarded by the University of Nottingham, which remains in partnership with Xu's WEG. Xu is chair of the UNNC board as well as of the Zhejiang Wanli University. UNNC grew from 1,000 students at its foundation to more than 7,500 by 2017, by which time Xu said it had become a household brand in Eastern China. In 2017 Xu visited the University of Nottingham's British campuses, and on 4 September was honoured by the naming of a building after her at the university's Jubilee Campus.
