= Xinhua Hospital (disambiguation) =

Xinhua Hospital may refer to:

- Xinhua Hospital (Shanghai), Xinhua Hospital Affiliated to Shanghai Jiao Tong University School of Medicine
- Xinhua Hospital (Zhejiang), Second Hospital Affiliated to Zhejiang Chinese Medical University
- Xinhua Hospital (Hubei), a hospital located in Hankou, Wuhan, which is a teaching hospital of Tongji Medical College, Huazhong University of Science and Technology
- Xinhua Hospital (Dalian), Xinhua Hospital Affiliated to Dalian University
