= Sino-foreign cooperative university =

Sino-foreign cooperative universities (Chinese: 中外合作办学机构), also known as joint institutes, are higher education institutions (HEIs) that are built in China and serve as overseas campuses of foreign universities. All cooperative universities must be approved by the Chinese Ministry of Education (MoE).

As of 2022, 1.8% (392,000) of bachelors and masters degree students in China attended a Sino-foreign cooperative university, according to the MoE.

Chinese students who attend SFCUs report that they prefer the Western-style liberal arts education system, which is more focused on critical thinking than the traditional exam-based Chinese education model. Many SFCUs offer English-language instruction, prohibit discrimination and promote intellectual diversity on campus. SFCUs tend to have similar rankings and brand reputation to their overseas counterparts, which students also view positively.

== History ==
The first Sino-foreign cooperative university campus, University of Nottingham Ningbo China, was established by the UK-based University of Nottingham and the Chinese-based Zhejiang Wanli University in 2004.

In 2025, China simplified its approval process for new higher education projects and approved a record 68 joint institutes with foreign partners. Demand for international education in China has risen among the middle class over the past decade, but so have costs for studying abroad, which is driving the demand for more SFCUs to be built in China. The MoE is preparing for a large-scale expansion of SFCUs to foster new education models and serve a projected peak in China's college-age population in 2032.

== Institutions ==
27 of China's 31 provinces have at least one joint institute. Foreign countries that have partnered with institutes in China include Australia, Russia, Israel, Germany, Hungary, Belarus, France, Italy, South Korea, Malaysia, New Zealand, the United Kingdom and the United States.

There are 10 approved SFCUs, as well as 382 non-independent joint degree programs and embedded institutes, in China as of May 2026.

== Controversies ==
In 2026, the Australian government forced two universities, Australian National University and University of Queensland, to end collaborations with Shandong University and the Chinese Academy of Sciences due to national security concerns.
