= Zhejiang Provincial Hospital of Chinese Medicine =

Hospital in Hangzhou, China

The Zhejiang Provincial Hospital of Chinese Medicine (simplified Chinese: 浙江省中医院; traditional Chinese: 浙江省中醫院; pinyin: Zhèjiāng Shěng Zhōngyīyuàn), also known as the "First Affiliated Hospital of Zhejiang University of Traditional Chinese Medicine" and the "First Clinical Medical College of Zhejiang University of Traditional Chinese Medicine", is a Grade A tertiary hospital of Traditional Chinese Medicine (TCM) in Hangzhou, capital city of Zhejiang Province, China. Established in 1931 as the first provincial hospital in Zhejiang, the hospital has developed into a comprehensive hospital of multiple campuses, integrating medical treatment, scientific research, teaching, healthcare, and rehabilitation.

== History ==
In 1931, the "Zhejiang Provincial Hospital" was founded in Hangzhou, the capital of Zhejiang Province in China. It was the earliest national hospital established in the province.

In 1956, the hospital recruited renowned traditional Chinese medicine practitioners from across the province, and was renamed "Zhejiang Provincial Hospital of Chinese Medicine".

In 1980, the hospital became an affiliated hospital of Zhejiang College of Traditional Chinese Medicine (now Zhejiang University of Traditional Chinese Medicine).

In 2001, the Hangzhou Xiasha Economic Development Zone Hospital merged into Zhejiang Provincial Hospital of Chinese Medicine, and became its Xiasha Campus.

In 2008, the hospital was officially designated by the State Administration of Traditional Chinese Medicine as one of the 11 national clinical research bases for traditional Chinese medicine.

In 2019, the Xixi Campus and the Fuyang New Campus were established.

In 2023, the Museum of Zhejiang Provincial Hospital of Traditional Chinese Medicine was opened to the public.

== Present situation ==
The Zhejiang Provincial Hospital of Chinese Medicine is a 3A hospital integrating traditional Chinese medicine with modern Western medical practices. There are over 4,000 staff members, including one academician of the Chinese Academy of Engineering, two national masters of traditional Chinese medicine, and two nationally renowned TCM doctors.

There are over 40 clinical departments. The annual number of outpatient and emergency visits is 4 million. And there are 2,370 inpatient beds, with 100,000 discharges annually.

There are five key national TCM specialties: Hematology, Respirator, Gastroenterology, Dermatology and Nursing.

In addition, the hospital has 1 national TCM clinical research base, 9 national key TCM disciplines, and 14 national key TCM specialties, as well as the National TCM Emergency Medical Center.

== Campuses ==
Zhejiang Provincial Hospital of Chinese Medicine has six campuses.

=== Hubin Campus ===
The old campus is located at 54 Youdian Road, Shangcheng District, Hangzhou, Zhejiang Province.

=== Xiasha Campus ===
Or the Xiasha site, is located at 9 Ninth Avenue, Hangzhou Economic and Technological Development Zone, in the Qiantang Districte.

=== Xixi Campus ===
On December 30, 2020, the Xixi Campus of Zhejiang Provincial Hospital of Traditional Chinese Medicine, also known as Zhejiang Rehabilitation Hospital, officially opened. It is jointly built by the Zhejiang Provincial Department of Civil Affairs, Zhejiang University of Traditional Chinese Medicine, and Zhejiang Provincial Hospital of Traditional Chinese Medicine. The campus has a total building area of 91,952.17 square meters, 1,100 beds, 24 clinical outpatient departments, 15 rehabilitation outpatient departments, and 12 nursing units.

=== Fuyang Campus (under construction) ===
Fuyang Campus is jointly built by Zhejiang University of Traditional Chinese Medicine, Zhejiang Provincial Hospital of Traditional Chinese Medicine and Fuyang District People's Government. It is located in Gaoqiao area of Yinhu Street, Fuyang District, adjacent to the Fuchun Campus of Zhejiang University of Traditional Chinese Medicine and Yangbei Lake Wetland Park. The total land area is 191.17 acres and the total investment is 3.22 billion yuan. Construction started in March 2021. After completion, the headquarters of Zhejiang Provincial Hospital of Traditional Chinese Medicine will be moved here.

=== Deqing Campus ===
The Deqing campus is building a digital medical center and a new hub for medical education and research.

=== Xiuzhou Campus ===
The Xiuzhou campus is creating a national medical center.

== Events ==
A major medical accident occurred in Zhejiang Provincial Hospital of Chinese Medicine in December 2016, resulting in at least five women being infected with human immunodeficiency virus (HIV). The accident was first reported by Zhejiang Provincial Hospital of Traditional Chinese Medicine to the Zhejiang Provincial Health and Family Planning Commission on January 26, 2017. After investigation, the Commission made it public on February 6, 2017, confirming that at least five women were infected with HIV. Afterwards, the hospital leaders involved were dismissed and warned, and the medical staff involved were later sentenced to 2 years and 6 months in prison for medical malpractice.

== See also ==
- Zhejiang University of Traditional Chinese Medicine
