= Lazada =

Singaporean-Chinese multinational technology

Lazada Group
- Logo used since 2019

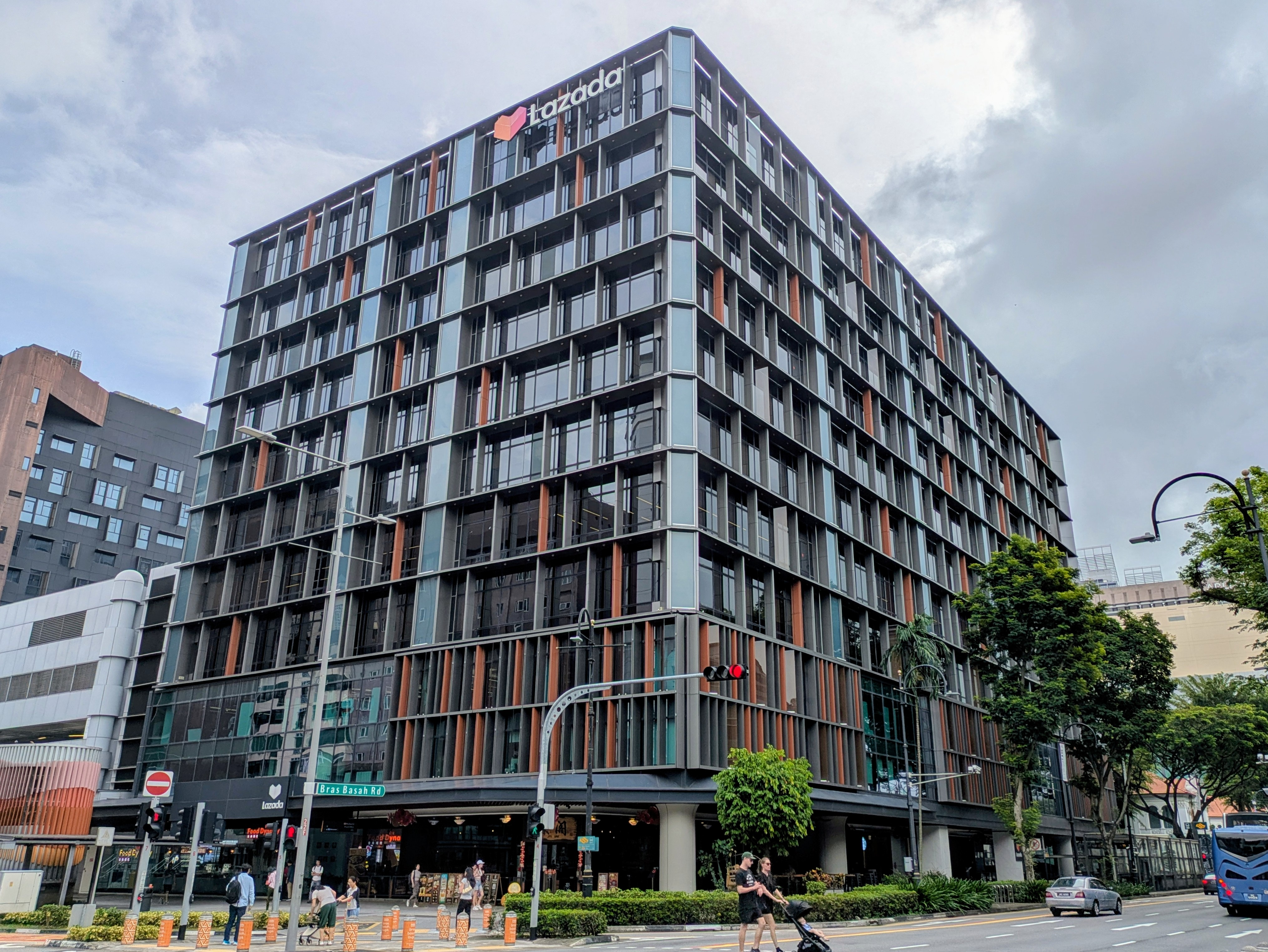
- Lazada One, Bras Basah - Lazada's regional headquarters of Singapore
- Type: Subsidiary
- Industry: E-commerce
- Founded: March 27, 2012; 14 years ago
- Founder: Maximilian Bittner
- Headquarters: Bras Basah, Singapore
- Area served: Southeast Asia, except Laos, Cambodia, Brunei, Myanmar and East Timor
- Key people: Jiang Fan (Group Chairman); James Dong (Group CEO); Lucy Peng (Executive Chairwoman)
- Services: E-commerce (Online shopping)
- Owner: Alibaba Group
- Subsidiaries: Lazada Vietnam; Lazada Singapore Pte. Ltd; Lazada E-Services Philippines, Inc.
- Website: www.lazada.com

Lazada Group (Chinese: 來贊達; t/a Lazada) is an international e-commerce company and one of the largest e-commerce operators in Southeast Asia, with over 10,000 third-party sellers as of November 2014, and 50 million annual active buyers as of September 2019.

Backed by Rocket Internet, Maximilian Bittner founded Lazada in 2012 as a marketplace platform that sells inventory to consumers from its own warehouses. Lazada modified its business model the following year to allow third-party retailers to sell their products on its platform too. The marketplace accounted for 65% of the company's sales in 2014.

Lazada operates in Southeast Asia, except Myanmar, Laos, Cambodia, Brunei and East Timor. The company raised over $685 million from investors such as Tesco, Temasek, Summit Partners, JPMorgan Chase, and Kinnevik AB, before Alibaba Group acquired a controlling stake in April 2016 to support its international expansion plans.

Often, Lazada is compared to companies in Southeast Asia with a similar e-commerce platform, such as Shopee, Tokopedia, and Bukalapak.

== History ==
In 2012, Maximilian Bittner founded Lazada with the intention of establishing an Amazon-like business model in Southeast Asia, to take advantage of the nascent online consumer market and Amazon's weak presence in the region. Lazada's e-commerce websites soft launched in 2012, before iOS and Android mobile apps for its platform were launched in June the following year.

The company commenced operations in Singapore in May 2014, where it is currently headquartered. In 2014, Lazada recorded $152.5 million in net operating losses, with net revenues of $154.3 million, although the percentage of losses—relative to gross merchandise value—was lower than the previous year due to growth in marketplace sales to $384 million that year, compared to $95 million in 2013.

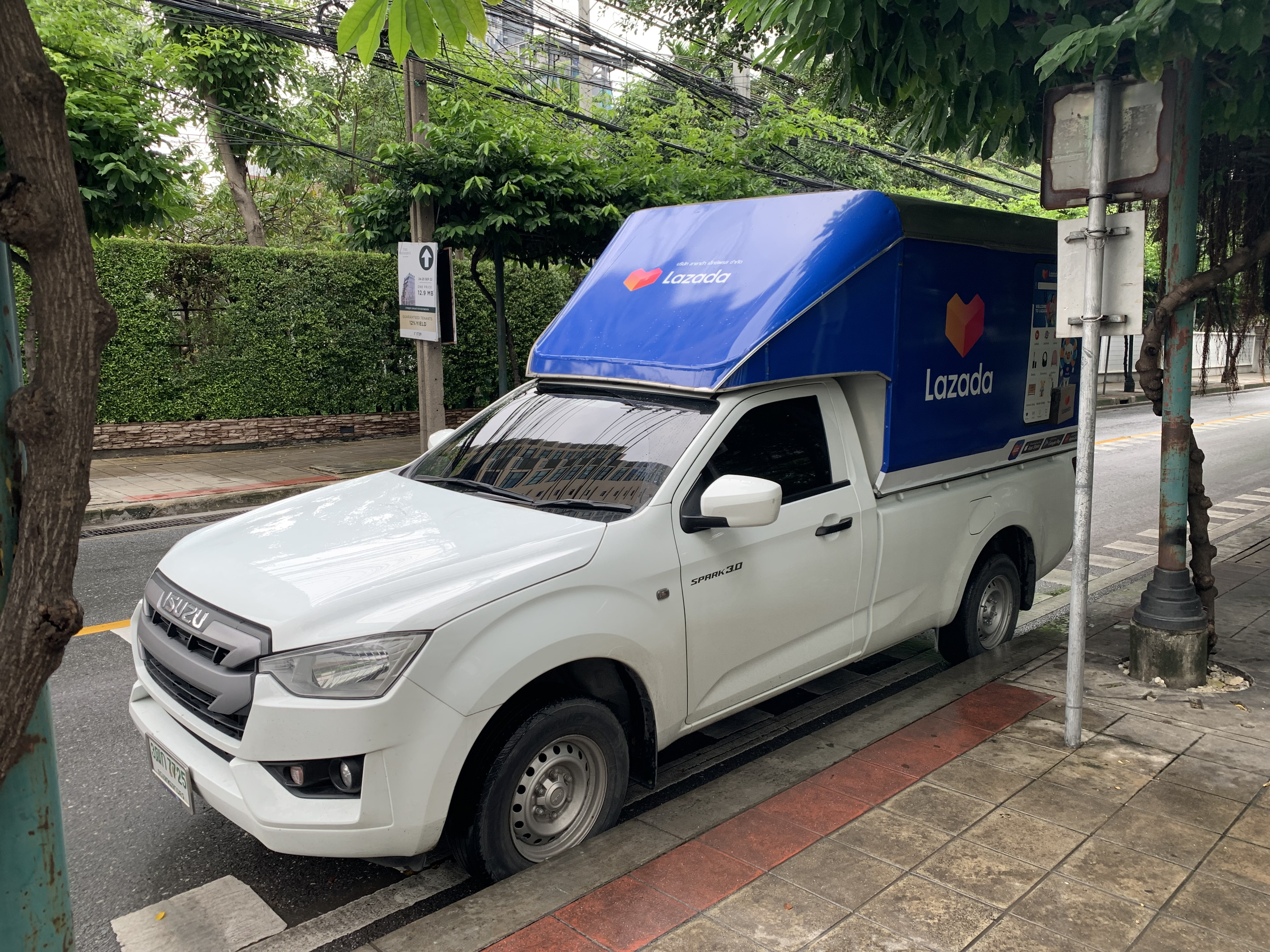
A vehicle for Lazada delivery in Bangkok

Lazada faced challenges in 2015, when consumer preference for brick and mortar shopping was high. Less than 1% of people shopped online, compared to the international average of 10% at that time. This meant that Lazada had to tackle issues associated with the lack of credit cards, the concomitant requirement for cash on delivery systems, and the need for reliable delivery—especially in rural regions.

In March 2016, Lazada claimed it had become the largest e-commerce player in Southeast Asia, after recording $1.36 billion in annual gross merchandise value across the six markets it operates in.

In November 2016, it is reported that Lazada was set to acquire, Singaporean grocery startup, Redmart for US$30–40 million.

In September 2018, the company introduced LazMall on its platform to encourage its users to purchase from authentic brands. New services such as a 15-day return policy and next-day delivery options were also put in place.

In October 2019, Lazada partnered with Citibank to launch a new credit card, first in Malaysia, and subsequently in other countries.

In 2023, Alibaba was restructured internally into six business units held by a holding company in response to China's regulatory pressure to decentralise its business power. and Lazada was placed under the Alibaba International Digital Commerce (AIDC) business unit. In 2022 Lazada received $378.5 million from new shares from Alibaba Singapore which was the largest investment since June 2020. Alibaba has recently made plans to expand Lazada to Europe in order to diversify its presence beyond China. In Europe AliExpress and Alibaba are present due to cross-border sales with China. AIDC would inject up to US$1.8 million into Lazada in 2023.

Since 2023, Lazada had conducted several rounds of retrenchment. In October 2023, it had a small retrenchment exercise. On 3 January 2024, it had another round of retrenchment.

On 3 January 2024, Lazada began retrenching an undisclosed number of employees from its Singapore headquarters. Despite its workers being unionised, the union, Food, Drinks and Allied Workers Union (FDAWU), was not consulted by the company about the retrenchment exercise. It was reported that the company would expect to reduce its Southeast Asia headcount by 25%-50%. The retrenched workers were given 2 weeks of pay for every year worked with them. Lazada later published an apology statement, stating it would consult the union for future retrenchment exercises. The union though accepted the apology, found that the retrenchment benefits was not satisfactory, and were in negotiation with Lazada for a better retrenchment benefits for the affected workers. Later it came to light that the retrenched workers are being locked down by a set of 12-month non-compete clauses if they wish to retain their vested stocks. The non-compete clauses include the prevention of working in an extensive list of companies such as in the supermarket chain NTUC Fairprice.

In 2026, Lazada retrenched five per cent of its Southeast Asian workforce, after "reviewing selected roles across South-east Asia".

== Financing ==
Lazada has raised multiple rounds of funding since its founding in 2012.

In April 2016, Alibaba Group announced its intention to acquire a controlling stake in Lazada by paying $500 million for new shares, and buying $500 million worth of shares from existing investors. Alibaba Group bought a controlling stake in Lazada for $1 billion, making it one of the largest overseas deals for the company. The transaction gave Alibaba a 51% control over the company, with valuation for Lazada estimated at $1.5 billion. The store operates in six southeast asian countries, Indonesia, Philippines, Malaysia, Singapore, Thailand and Vietnam. The deal allows Alibaba to expand beyond its home market and tap into the region's 550 million consumers, where only 3% commerce occurs online. Tesco sold its stake in Lazada—totalling 8.6%—to Alibaba for $129 million. Alibaba based its investment on the growth of the middle class in Southeast Asia, having estimated that the regional population with a disposable income of $16 to $100 a day would double to 400 million people by 2020.

In June 2017, Alibaba injected $1 billion in Lazada, raising its stake from 51% to 83%. In September 2025, Lazada launched a program allowing Tmall merchants to sell directly into Southeast Asia via Lazada without opening separate local stores; sellers ship to a China warehouse and Lazada handles logistics, customs, sales, and local‑language customer service end‑to‑end.

Date	Funding	Investors	References
September 2012	Undisclosed	JPMorgan Chase	
November 2012	$40 million	Kinnevik AB	
December 2012	$26 million	Summit Partners	
January 2013	$20 million	Tengelmann Group	
June 2013	$100 million	Verlinvest (lead), Holtzbrinck Ventures, Kinnevik AB, Summit Partners, Tengelmann Group	
December 2013	$250 million	Tesco, Access Industries, Kinnevik AB, Verlinvest	
November 2014	$249 million	Temasek (lead), Kinnevik AB, Verlinvest, Rocket Internet	
April 2016	$500 million	Alibaba Group (acquisition)	
June 2017	$1 billion	Alibaba Group	
May 2022	$378.25 million	Alibaba Group	
September 2022	$912.5 million	Alibaba Group	

== Leadership changes ==
Role	Outgoing	Start	End	Incoming	References
Group CEO	Maximilian Bittner	March 2012	March 2018	Lucy Peng	
Group CEO	Lucy Peng	March 2018	December 2018	Pierre Poignant	
Group CEO	Pierre Poignant	December 2018	June 2020	Chun Li	
Group CEO	Chun Li	June 2020	June 2022	James Dong	

== Controversies ==
=== Counterfeit products ===
Lazada faces issues of counterfeit products being sold on its platform. The company has insisted a zero tolerance policy towards such products. As a response they have launched LazMall in 2018, The Intellectual Property Office of the Philippines recorded Lazada to be the largest source of reports for counterfeit products it received in the first half of 2023 at 69 percent.

=== LazEarth ===
Lazada launched its LazEarth campaign in April 2022 to reduce plastic waste in its products and packaging. This coincided with the launch of an Earth Day promotion, when 5,000 products labelled "sustainable" or "planet-friendly" were grouped into a promotional section on Lazada's platform, including polyester shirts, razors, electric toothbrushes, and more. Sustainability experts criticised the promotion as many of the products advertised were plastic disposable products, and offering discounts for such products did little to reduce plastic waste.

=== Boycott by the Royal Thai Army ===
Lazada faced a boycott by the Royal Thai Army in May 2022 due to a controversy arising from a TikTok video promoting a sale by the company. Posted on 5 May, the video included a depiction of a woman using a wheelchair, which was perceived as an attempt to mock the younger sister of King Vajiralongkorn, Princess Chulabhorn, thus violating Thailand's lèse-majesté law. Chulabhorn uses a wheelchair as a result of lupus. 245,000 members of the army were prohibited from patronising Lazada as a result.

== See also ==
- Amazon
- Bukalapak
- Shopee
- Tokopedia
- Carrousell
- Taobao
