= Kuka Home =

Chinese upholstery furniture manufacturer

KUKA HOME
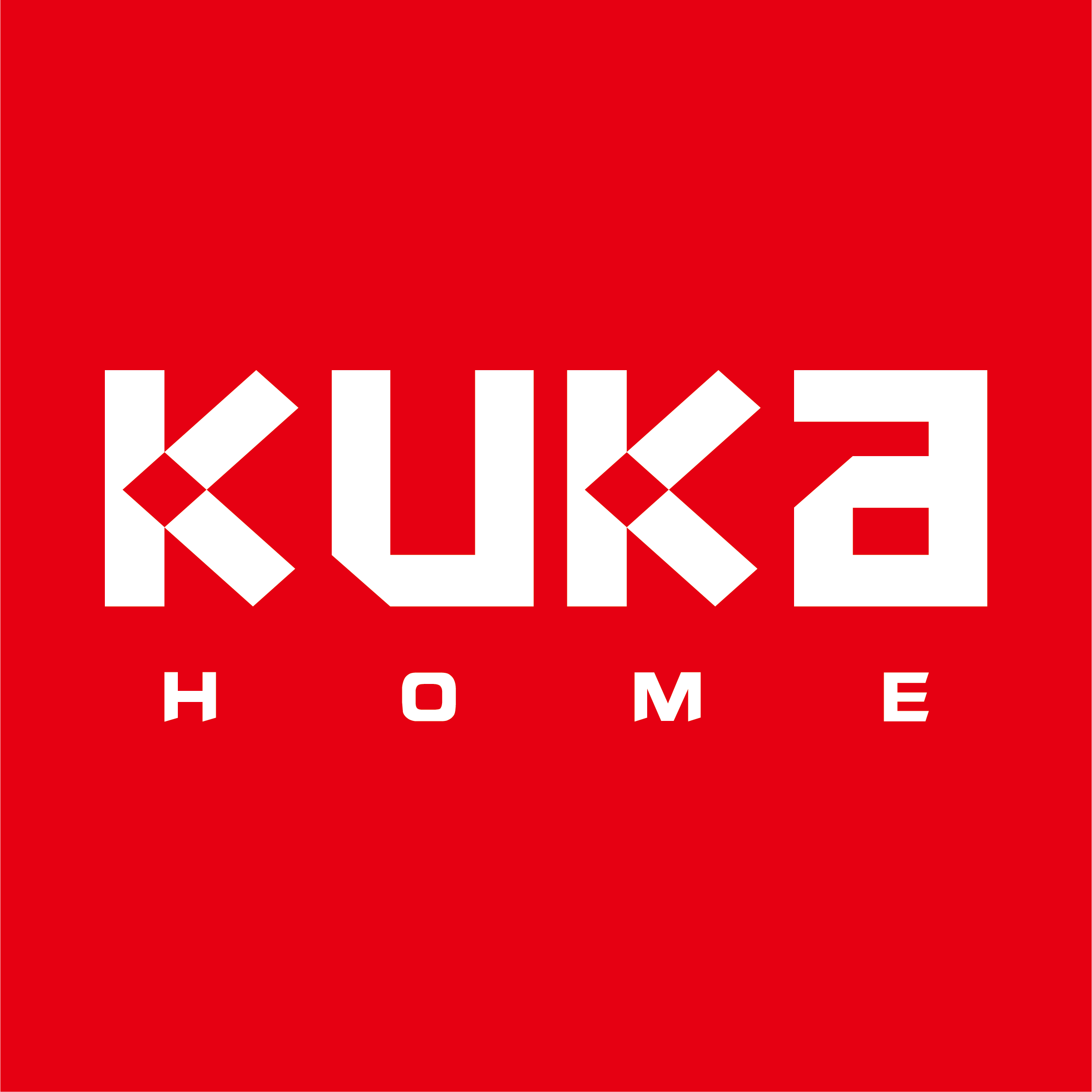
- Product type: Leather Sofas, Fabric Sofas, Motion Sofas, Beds, Dining Chairs
- Current owner: Jason Furniture (Hangzhou) Co., Ltd.
- Country: China
- Introduced: 1982
- Markets: Worldwide (120 countries and regions)
- Tagline: Care for Family and Love Family
- Website: en.kukahome.com

KUKA HOME is a Chinese upholstery furniture manufacturer. KUKA was established by Gu Yuhua in 1982 in Nantong, Jiangsu Province. The company is a subsidiary of Jason Furniture (Hangzhou) Co. Ltd., and is officially listed on the Shanghai Stock Exchange since 14 October 2016. The company is headquartered in Hangzhou, China. KUKA HOME has 4,000 brand stores and five production bases that are located in Xiasha, Jiangdong in Zhejiang Province, Hubei Province and Hebei Province.

KUKA HOME is the Chinese partner of American furniture manufacturer La-Z-Boy, and Italian high-end furniture company Natuzzi.
