= Peng Lei =

Chinese businesswoman

- Chinese: 彭蕾
- Born: 1972 or 1973 (age 53–54); Wanzhou, Chongqing, China
- Other name: Lucy Peng
- Education: Zhejiang Gongshang University
- Occupations: Co-founder & CEO, Ant Financial; Chief people officer, Alibaba
- Spouse: Sun Tongyu

Peng Lei (Chinese: 彭蕾 born 1972/73), also known as Lucy Peng, is a Chinese billionaire businesswoman. She is one of the founders of the e-commerce company Alibaba Group. As of March 2017, Peng was one of 21 self-made women billionaires in China.

== Career ==
Peng earned a degree in business administration in 1994 from Hangzhou Institute of Commerce, which was later renamed as Zhejiang Gongshang University. Following her graduation, she taught at the Zhejiang University of Finance and Economics for five years. Peng quit teaching shortly after marrying, and with her husband (who would later run Taobao, Alibaba's eBay reminiscent marketplace) joined Jack Ma in founding Alibaba in September 1999. They were one of the many husband and wife teams making up the 1/3rd ratio of women amongst Alibaba's founding partners that the company would later become positively praised for.

Her early responsibilities with the company involved managing the HR department of Alibaba, which she herself created. During this period, one of her notable accomplishments is developing the "mom and pop" model at Alibaba, in which one "mom" focused on teamwork and motivation, while one "pop" handled performance assessments.

From January 2010 to February 2013, Peng was the chief executive of Alipay. Alipay became the most successful payment gateway within China under her management, expanding to over 800 million users as of 2014. As of the end of 2014, it was valued at around $60 billion.

In March 2013, Peng took over as chief executive of Alibaba Small and Micro Financial Services. There, she made significant progress in searching for innovations in the mobile payments system.

In 2013, Peng's name was frequently floated by the Chinese press as a candidate for Alibaba's next chief executive. However, another executive eventually got the job.

In 2014, Peng founded Ant Financial Services Group. In September 2015, Alibaba and Ant Financial together took a combined 40% stake in Indian mobile wallet operator Paytm, placing Peng as a member of its board of directors In 2016, Ant Financial broke the record for the world's largest private fundraising found for an internet company at $4.5 billion, placing the company at an approximately $60 billion valuation.

She also served as chief people officer, the chief human resources officer for Alibaba Group for over 10 years. In this position, she oversaw the approximately 35,000 employees under Alibaba.

Peng became a billionaire in 2014 based on Alibaba's valuation prior to its record-setting IPO. Following the suspending of that IPO and Jack Ma's disengaging from public appearance, Peng unexpectedly replaced him on these including the finale of Africa's Business Heroes in November 2019.

== Personal life ==
Three years after she began teaching, Peng married Sun Tongyu. She later divorced him for a short period, but then remarried him.

Porter Erisman in his 2012 documentary Crocodile in the Yangtze about Alibaba's early years, described Peng as "a funny and down-to-earth" leader. In 2015 Erisman, who is the former Vice President of Alibaba, published a book on Alibaba's World: How a remarkable Chinese Company is Changing the Face of Global Business.

In 2015, she was ranked as the third richest woman in the tech sector by Wealth-X, and the #11 Most Powerful Woman in Asia by Fortune.

As of 2016, Peng was listed as the 35th most powerful woman in the world by Forbes, #35 on their list of Power Women for 2016, and #17 on their list of Asia Power Women for 2016. In the same year, Forbes estimated her net worth to be $1.1 billion.
