= Xiasha Subdistrict =

Area in Hangzhou, China

Coordinates: 30.3045°N 120.3202°E

Xiasha (Chinese: t 下沙, s 下沙, p Xiàshā, lit. "Lower Sands") is an industrial and educational center, located about 15 kilometers (9.3 mi) east of central Hangzhou, the capital of Zhejiang Province in the People's Republic of China. It is administered as a subdistrict of Hangzhou's Qiantang District.

== Geography ==
This area is included is part of the Yangtze River Delta region, which includes Shanghai, Jiangsu, and Zhejiang Provinces.

== History ==
Xiasha is also called HEDA, which stands for the Hangzhou Economic and Technological Development Area. The area was founded in 1993 as one of China's first state level development zones. The zone currently occupied 34 square kilometers and may soon expand to a long range estimate of 100 kilometers. Xiasha strives to be an international industrial, scientific and manufacturing zone, paramount with a park of flags from all over the World which can be seen upon entering the center of Xiasha. Most of what is produced in Xiasha are microelectronics, mobile telecommunications, optical equipment products, automobile products, chemicals and computer laptops.

Several international companies are located in Xiasha, including Siemens, Motorola, Toshiba, Mitsubishi, Allergan, Terumo, Panasonic, Dingyi, and Wahaha. HEDA boasts 600 industrial enterprises in all.

== Education ==
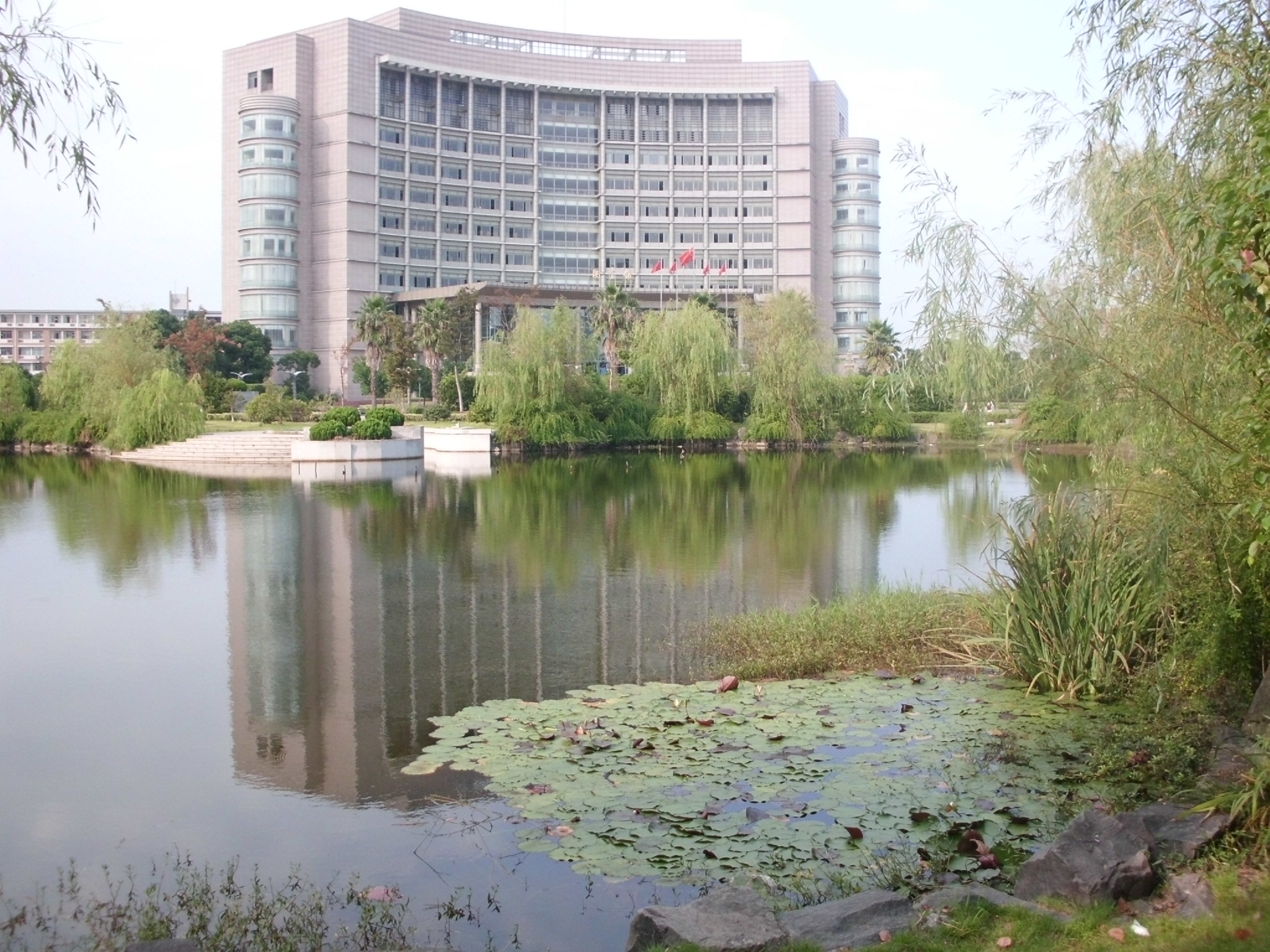
Zhejiang Sci-Tech University campus

Xiasha is also a district of colleges and universities. Xiasha Higher Education Park (下沙高教园区) [zh] has 14 universities, including Zhejiang Sci-Tech University, Zhejiang Gongshang University, Hangzhou Dianzi University, and Communication University of Zhejiang. These 14 universities educate more than 120,000 students. Most of these schools were formerly located in other parts of Hangzhou, but moved to Xiasha starting around 2000.

The area lies near the Qiantang River, which is known for its tidal bore.

== Transport ==
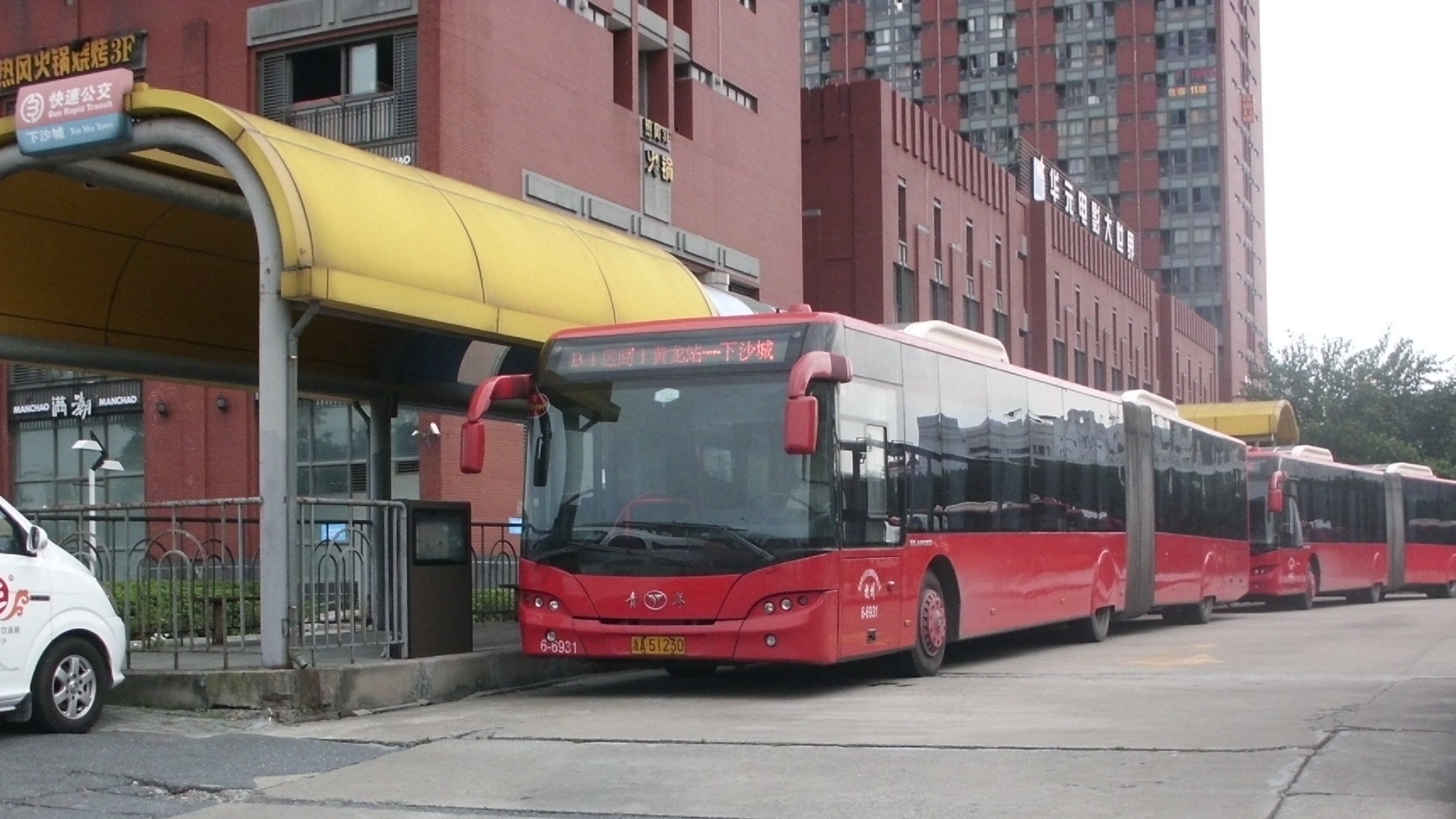
B1 bus

Before the Hangzhou Metro Line 1 opened, some faculty and staff who worked in Xiasha Higher Education Park but lived in central Hangzhou relied primarily on buses for their daily commute. In 2012, residential, commercial, and hotel-apartment developments were under construction around Xiasha's planned metro stations. Line 1 began trial operations on November 24, 2012, connecting central Hangzhou with Xiasha.

There is excellent highway transportation leading to Xiasha from nearby cities, serviced by the Shanghai-Hangzhou, Hangzhou-Ningbo, and Hangzhou-Beilun highways. The nearest airport to Xiasha is the Xiaoshan International Airport, about 25 minutes by car. There are local taxi services that are numerous and easily noticeable on the roadways. Several bus lines tie Xiasha District to the city center of Hangzhou. The Hangzhou Metro also passes through this area. It takes about 45 min to get to Wulin Square by metro, which is faster than the B1 bus. However, the ticket price of the metro is higher than the B1 bus.

== See also ==
- List of township-level divisions of Zhejiang
