= Zhejiang University of Finance and Economics =

Public University in Hangzhou, China

Coordinates: 30°19′18″N 120°23′41″E

- 浙江财经大学
- Former names: Zhejiang Academy of Public Finance and Banking
- Motto: 进德修业 与时偕行 (Achieve with moral progress, progress with the Times)
- Type: Public
- Established: 1974; 52 years ago
- President: Chen Yantai (陈衍泰)
- Party Secretary: Wei Jiang (魏江)
- Faculty: 1,150 (full-time)
- Students: 19,000+
- Location: Hangzhou, Zhejiang Province, China
- Website: www.zufe.edu.cn

Zhejiang University of Finance and Economics
- Traditional Chinese: 浙江財經大學
- Simplified Chinese: 浙江财经大学
Transcriptions
Standard Mandarin
- Hanyu Pinyin: Zhèjiāng Cáijīng Dàxué

Zhejiang University of Finance and Economics (abbreviated ZUFE; Chinese: 浙江财经大学; pinyin: Zhèjiāng Cáijīng Dàxué; also colloquially referred to as 浙财; Zhècái) is a public university located in Hangzhou, China. The university specializes in economic disciplines and provides education in science, law, and the humanities. In the 2022 Times Higher Education World University Rankings, ZUFE ranked 801-1000.

== History ==
The university was founded in December 1974 as the Zhejiang Academy of Public Finance and Banking. It has changed its name and campus several times. During its first year, many students rented houses from nearby silk farms. In 1987, the State Education Commission renamed it the Zhejiang Institute of Finance and Economics. It was authorized to grant bachelor's degrees starting in 1991 and master's degrees in 2003, and began doctoral training in 2012 under a national pilot programme for specialised talent. ZUFE received its current name in 2013, when it was approved by the Ministry of Education of the People's Republic of China. It was approved to establish a postdoctoral research station in 2014 and was named one of Zhejiang's provincial key construction universities in 2017. In 2021 it began a formal cooperation in graduate education with the University of Chinese Academy of Social Sciences. It gained authority to award doctorates in applied economics as a first-level discipline in 2018, and the discipline was selected as one of Zhejiang's "peak disciplines" in 2023.

Since 2024 the university has pursued a "new finance and economics" strategy under Wei Jiang, its former president and current Party Secretary and previously dean of the Zhejiang University School of Management. Its reforms include a "one student, one plan" model that replaces majors with projects as the basic unit of undergraduate training. In January 2026 the university published a strategic charter setting the goal of joining the leading group of Chinese finance and economics universities by 2030.

== Campuses and organisation ==
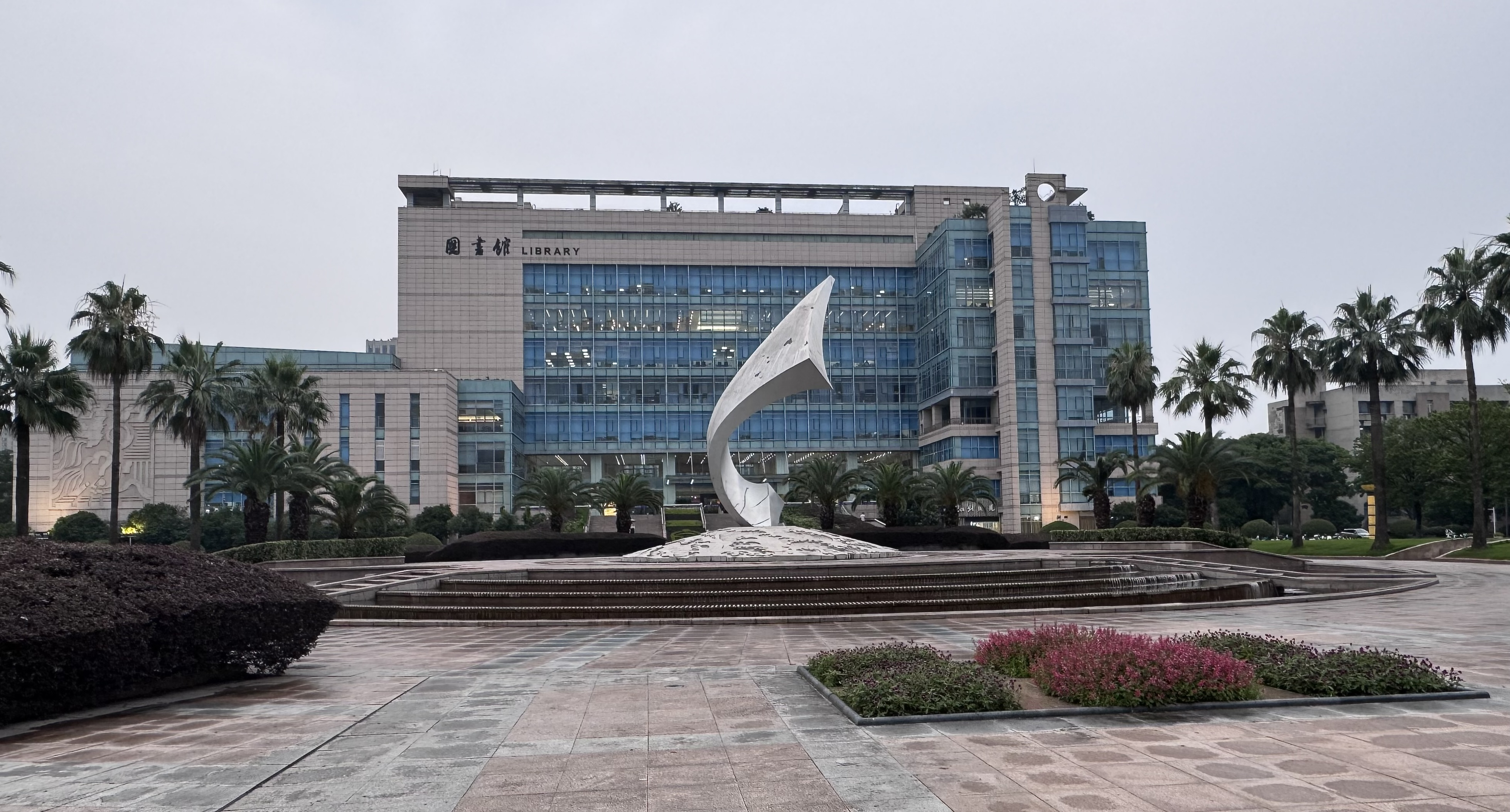
Xiasha Campus Library

ZUFE has four campuses: Xiasha, Wenhua, Cuiyuan and Chang'an. The main campus is in the Xiasha Higher Education Zone in Hangzhou's Qiantang District, where all full-time undergraduates study. The university has 16 schools, three research institutes and one teaching department, offering 6 doctoral, 54 master's and 45 bachelor's programmes. It enrolls international students as well as students from Hong Kong, Macau and Taiwan, and has a full-time student population of over 19,000.

The university has over 1,600 staff, including 1,150 full-time faculty members, of whom 180 are professors and 380 are associate professors.

=== Dongfang College ===
Dongfang College (浙江财经大学东方学院) is ZUFE's affiliated independent college, approved by the Zhejiang provincial government in 1999 and confirmed by the Ministry of Education in 2004. It focuses on applied undergraduate education in economics and management. In September 2010 it moved from the Wenhua campus in Hangzhou to a new campus in Chang'an, Haining. A plan to merge it with a vocational college and convert it into a vocational university was halted in June 2021.

== Research ==
ZUFE holds first-level doctoral programmes in applied economics and statistics, and ten first-level master's programmes. Its applied economics research focuses on four areas: government regulation theory and policy, local fiscal governance, digital finance, and behavioural and experimental economics.

== Graduate outcomes ==
Of the university's 2025 undergraduate graduates, 94.55% had secured employment or further study, and 38.59% went on to postgraduate study. Around 100 of its graduates join the Zhejiang branch of the State Taxation Administration each year, the most of any university in the province.

== Identity ==
The university's name in its official logotype is written in the calligraphy of Sha Menghai. Its motto is 进德修业 与时偕行.

== Publications ==
The university publishes Collected Essays on Finance and Economics (财经论丛), a monthly, double-blind peer-reviewed economics journal founded in 1985 and indexed in the Chinese Social Sciences Citation Index (ISSN 1004-4892).

== Notable people ==
Notable alumni have included:

- Huang Xuming - Vice-governor of Zhejiang province from 2013; graduated in public finance in 1979 from the Zhejiang School of Finance and Banking, ZUFE's predecessor
- Chu Ziyu - Party Secretary and Director of the Zhejiang Provincial Department of Culture and Tourism and the Party Secretary of the Zhejiang Conservatory of Music
- Mao Zijun - Chinese actor
- Jacob Mardell - Journalist and researcher at the Mercator Institute for China Studies
- Marco Foerster ^{FRAS} - G20 Task Force Member

Notable professors include:

- Sha Zukang - Chinese diplomat and head of the United Nations Department of Economic and Social Affairs from 2007 to 2012
- Peng Lei - Co-founder of Alibaba Group and former CEO of Ant Financial

== Partner Universities ==
- Bangor University
- Coventry University
- University of Winnipeg
- University of Dayton
- Shih Hsin University
- Laurentian University
- Karaganda University of Kazpotrebsoyuz
