= Xincheng Xie =

Xincheng Xie (Chinese: 谢心澄; born February 1959) is a Chinese condensed matter physicist and academic administrator. He is a professor at Peking University and the president of the University of Nottingham Ningbo China. He is an academician of the Chinese Academy of Sciences (CAS) and The World Academy of Sciences (TWAS).

== Early life and education ==
Xie was born in Nanjing, Jiangsu, China, in February 1959. He graduated from the Department of Modern Physics at the University of Science and Technology of China (USTC) in 1982. He then went to the United States to further his studies at the University of Maryland, where he received his Ph.D. in physics in 1988.

== Career ==
After receiving his doctorate, Xie worked as a postdoctoral researcher at the University of Washington and the University of Maryland. In 1991, he joined the faculty at Oklahoma State University, where he became a full professor in 2001. He returned to China in 2005 and became a professor at the Institute of Physics, CAS, where he served as director of the Laboratory of Condensed Matter Theory and Computational Materials Physics. He has been a professor at Peking University since 2009.

He was awarded the status of Fellow in the American Physical Society, after he was nominated by his Forum on International Physics in 2008, for important contributions to the theoretical understanding of two-dimensional electron systems. He worked to foster collaboration between physicists in China and the United States, and co-organizing a number of important international workshops and conferences.

Xie served as Dean of the School of Physics at Peking University from 2011 to 2018. He was appointed Vice President of the National Natural Science Foundation of China in 2018. He became President of the University of Nottingham Ningbo China in 2024.

== See also ==
- List of fellows of the American Physical Society (1998–2010)
