= Ningbo Campus, Zhejiang University =

Zhejiang University campus in Ningbo, China

- 浙江大学宁波科创中心（宁波校区）
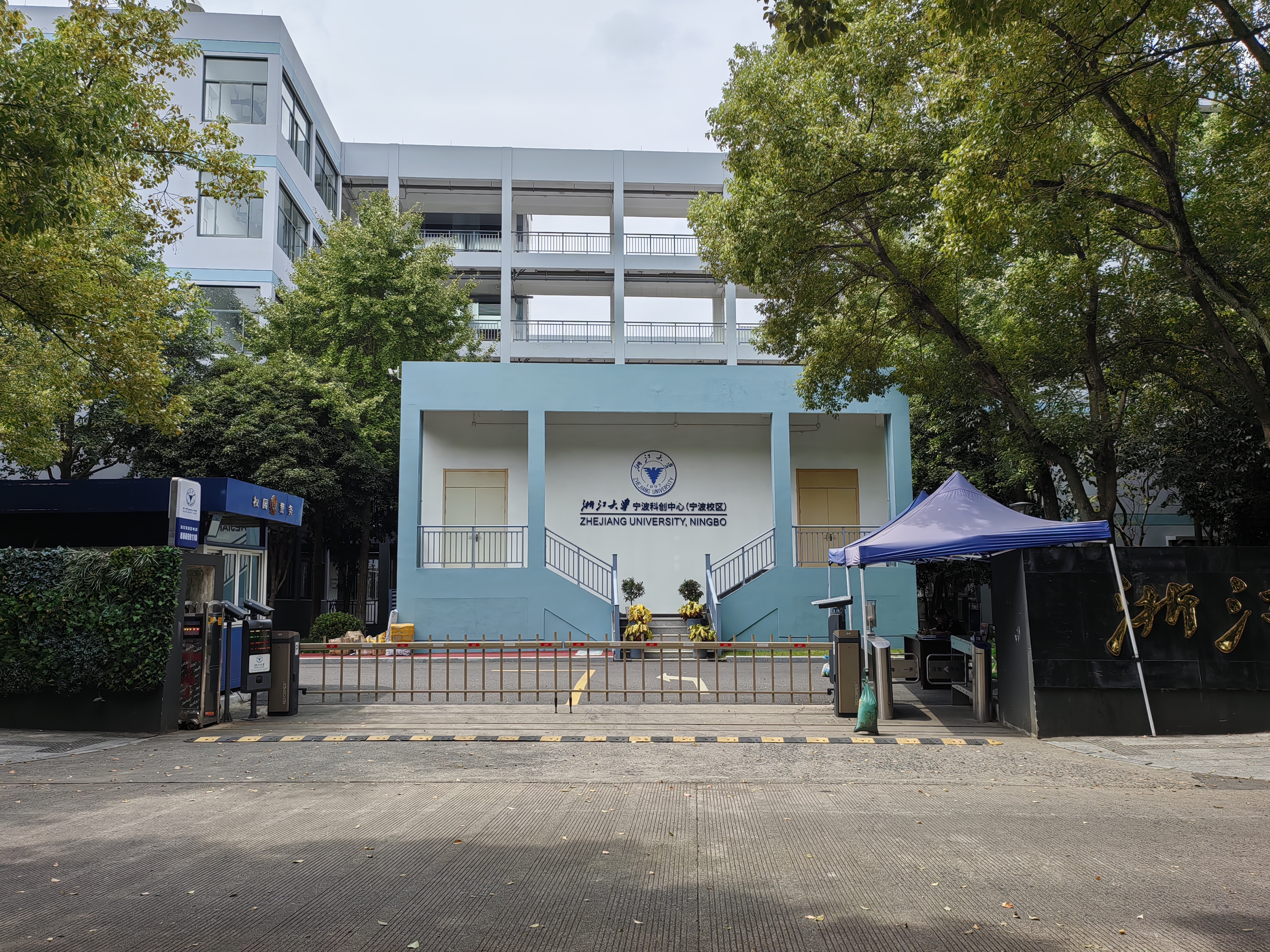
- Ningbo Campus in 2023
- Established: June 2001; 25 years ago (as a NingboTech campus) November 2020; 5 years ago (as a ZJU campus)
- Parent institution: Zhejiang University (ZJU)
- Location: 1 South Qianhu Road, Ningbo, Zhejiang, 315100, China; 29.81695°N 121.57022°E
- Campus: 106.67 hectares (263.6 acres)
- Website: nb.zju.edu.cn

Ningbo Campus is a campus of Zhejiang University located in the Ningbo Higher Education Park, Ningbo, Zhejiang Province.

== History ==
In 2001, Zhejiang University established the Ningbo Institute of Technology as an independent college, thus acquiring its Ningbo campus. The independent college is a type of collaboration between the public university and the business sector in China, which awards its own degree independently. Since 2019, these colleges have been transformed to be separated from the public university that they are affiliated to. The Ningbo Institute of Technology was transformed into NingboTech University as a provincial public university, but remains on the campus as a collaboration between Zhejiang University and the Ningbo Municipal Government.

In October 2016, the Polytechnic Institute, Zhejiang University started recruiting students for its Ningbo branch. Since 2016, Zhejiang University expanded collaboration with the Ningbo Municipal Government. In August 2018, a further agreement was signed between the university and the government to form its Ningbo Campus by establishing the Institute of Ningbo, the International School of Design and the Ningbo branch institution of Polytechnic Institute, relocating the School of Software Technology and improving the academics of NingboTech.

== Institutions ==
- NingboTech University
- School of Software Technology, Zhejiang University
- Polytechnic Institute, Zhejiang University
- Institute of Ningbo, Zhejiang University
- International School of Design, Zhejiang University
