= Chinese Academy of Management Science =

Deregistered public institution based in Beijing, China

The Chinese Academy of Management Science (中国管理科学研究院) was a public institution based in Beijing, China, sponsored by the China Tourism and Cultural Resources Development Promotion Association (中国旅游文化资源开发促进会). The organization was deregistered by the State Administration for Public Institution Registration (SAPIR; 国家事业单位登记管理局) on 23 June 2024 due to extensive for-profit commercial operations as a nonprofit public-welfare organization. Before the deregistration, the academy had been widely reported in the media for selling competition awards, professional licenses, and academic certificates.

== Controversies ==
In June 2019, Xinhua News Agency reported "Who is the 'mysterious' seller who are selling 'national' and 'China' certificates and awards for thousands of yuan?" It reported that the China Academy of Management Sciences sells a large number of "national competition" awards and professional skills licenses with "China National" as the prefix. Among them, a sample certificate sent by a staff member was stamped with two official seals, namely "Academic Committee of the China Academy of Management Sciences" and "Professional Talent Skills Training Center of the China Academy of Management Sciences". The reporter learned from the government that the phenomenon of selling certificates and awards in the name of the China Academy of Management Sciences' subordinate institutions has appeared in many places across the country, and many people are involved.

In October 2023, the media reported that a so-called training institution on the Internet claimed that there was no need for an exam or training for the "Feng Shui Master Certificate". As long as personal information was provided, it would be mailed in about 20 days. Each certificate cost 860 yuan, and the issuing unit was the "China Academy of Management Science Professional Talent Skills Certification Center". Another so-called training institution sold Chinese Academy of Management Science-issued academic certificates for talents in the field of carbon emission reduction that could be issued without taking an exam, and each certificate cost 500 yuan.

== Regulatory information ==
The China Academy of Management Science and its subordinate institutions were frequently subject to administrative penalties in the "Illegal and Irregular Information Notice" column of the website of the State Administration for Public Institution Registration (SAPIR).

=== Administrative announcements ===
In May 2019, a notice by SAPIR stated that after investigation, the China Academy of Management Science had failed to apply for the change of residence registration in accordance with the regulations. According to Article 70 of the "Detailed Rules for the Implementation of the Interim Regulations on the Registration and Administration of Public Institutions", it was decided to issue a written warning to the academy and notify the administrative penalty of its sponsoring organization.

In July 2021 and January 2022, notices by SAPIR stated that, the "China Academy of Management Science Intangible Cultural Heritage Protection Research Center" that carried out activities in the name of public institutions was not approved and not registered.

=== Deregistration ===
On June 23, 2024, the State Administration for Public Institution Registration decided to deregistered the organization. In a public announcement, the administrative said that, after investigation, the China Academy of Management Science had not carried out activities in accordance with the registration matters, had set up subordinate institutions indiscriminately, arbitrarily expanded its business scope, and sold vocational skills training certificates to the society for the purpose of profit. The organization's extensive commercial practices seriously deviated from its public welfare attributes, seriously infringed on the rights and interests of the people, and seriously affected the stability of social order. In accordance with Article 70 of the "Detailed Rules for the Implementation of the Interim Regulations on the Registration and Administration of Public Institutions", it was decided to revoke the registration of the China Academy of Management Science and confiscate the "Public Institution Legal Person Certificate" and its organizational seal.
