= Zhejiang A&F University =

Provincial public university in Hangzhou, Zhejiang, China

- 浙江农林大学
- Type: Public university
- Established: 1960
- President: Zhou Guomo
- Location: Hangzhou, Zhejiang, China; 30.256472°N 119.728361°E
- Campus: Urban area
- Colours
- Website: zafu.edu.cn

Zhejiang A&F University
- Traditional Chinese: 浙江農林大學
- Simplified Chinese: 浙江农林大学
Transcriptions
Standard Mandarin
- Hanyu Pinyin: Zhèjiāng nónglín Dàxué

Zhejiang A&F University (ZAFU; 浙江农林大学), formerly Zhejiang Agriculture and Forestry University, is a provincial public university in Hangzhou, Zhejiang, China.

Zhejiang A&F University was established in 1960 by the merge of Tianmu Forestry College and Zhejiang Agriculture College.

== Administration ==
=== Administrative offices ===
The administrative offices are structured into the following divisions:

- Teaching Affairs Office
- Center of Equipment Purchase and Management
- Department of Science and Technology Administration
- Graduate Department
- Student Affairs Department
- Admissions and Career Service Office
- Capital Construction Department
- Department of University Rear Service Administration
- Supervision and Auditing Office
- International Office
- Public Security Department
- Center of Modern Educational Technology
- Center of Educational Development
- Headquarters of New Campus Construction
- University Rear Service Corp.

=== Schools and departments ===
The university is organized into the following schools and departments.

- School of Agriculture and Food Science
- School of Forestry and Biotechnology
- School of Environmental Technology
- School of Animal Science and Technology
- School of Engineering
- School of Landscape Architecture
- School of Economics and Management
- School of Humanities
- School of Information Science and Technology
- School of Foreign Languages
- School of Tourism and Health
- School of Tea Culture
- School of Sciences
- School of Art Design
- International College
- Continuing Education College
- Division of Physical Education and Military Training

== School scenery ==
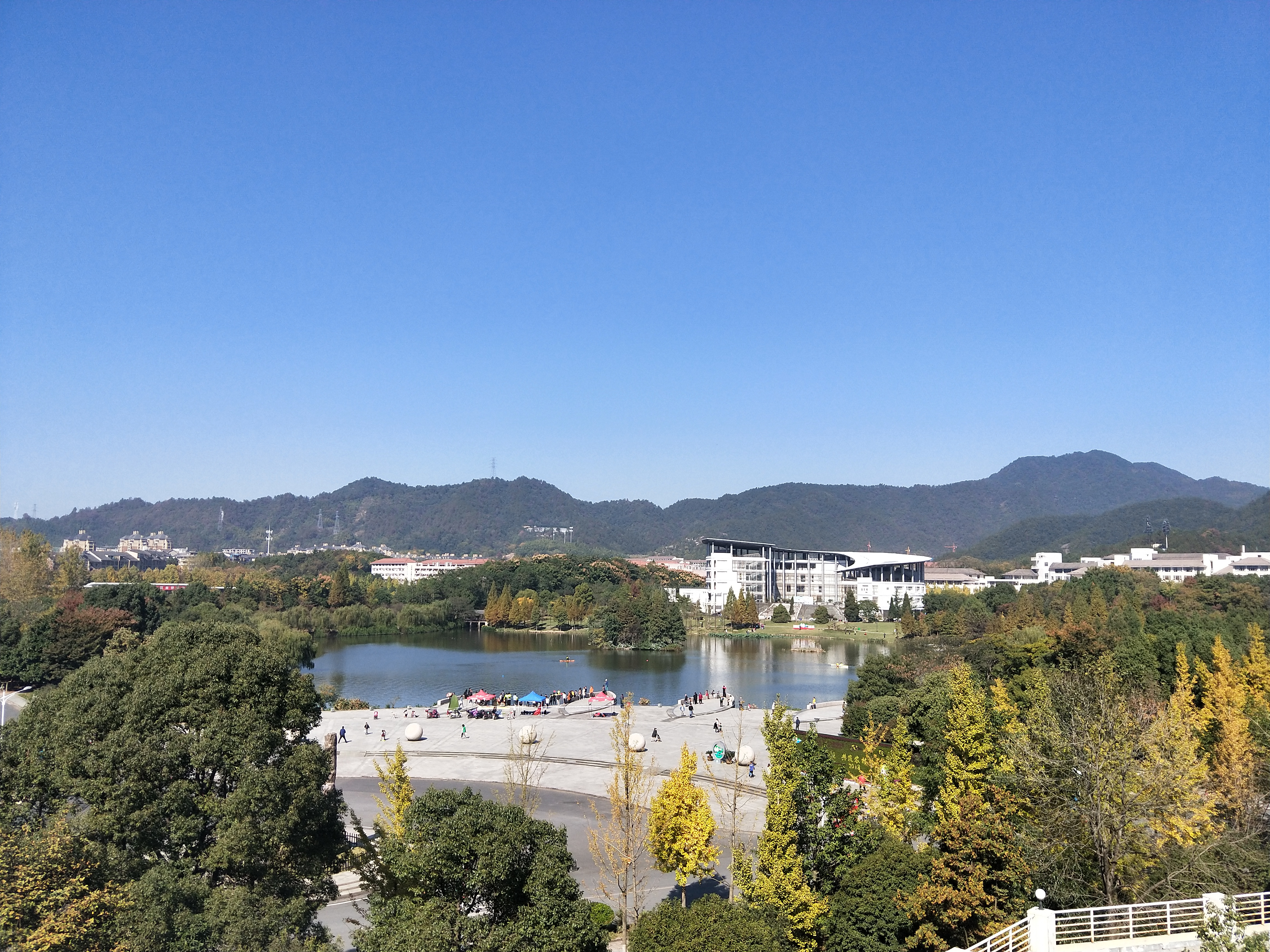
Overlooking the library

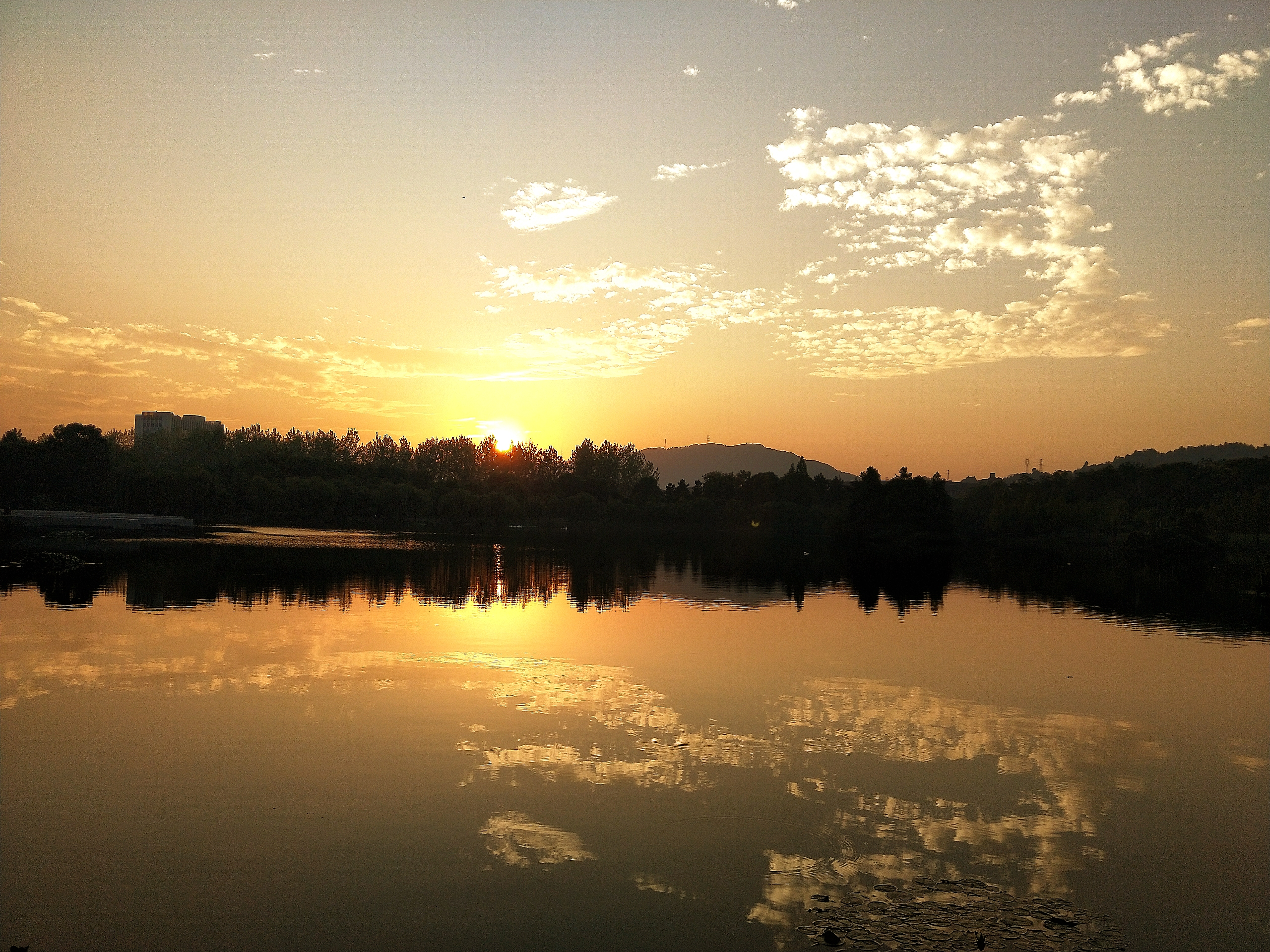
East Lake Dusk
