= Zhejiang University of Science and Technology =

Chinese university

- 浙江科技大学
- Type: Public university
- Established: 1980
- Affiliations: Zhejiang Provincial Department of Education
- President: Chen Jianmeng
- Faculty: 1620
- Students: 19000
- Postgraduates: 1000
- Doctoral students: 300
- Location: Hangzhou, Zhejiang, China
- Campus: Urban area
- Colours
- Nickname: ZUST
- Website: www.zust.edu.cn/

Zhejiang university of Science and Technology History University of Science & Technology (Chinese: 浙江科技大学), abbreviated as ZUST, is a full-time undergraduate university under the jurisdiction of Zhejiang Province. It is a distinctive application-oriented provincial undergraduate university with the authority to confer master's and bachelor's degrees and to enroll international students and students from Hong Kong, Macao, and Taiwan. The main campus is located in the Xiaoheshan Higher Education Park in Xihu District, Hangzhou, and the branch campus is located in the Anji Science, Education, and Culture New Area. It was listed by the Ministry of Education as one of the first batch of universities implementing the "Excellent Engineer Education and Training Program," one of the first batch of universities selected for the "New Engineering Research and Practice Projects," and a construction unit of "Zhejiang Province Internationalization Characteristic Universities."

== History ==
In 1980, the Hangzhou Industrial College Affiliated to Zhejiang University (ZJU) was established.

In 1983, it became independent as Hangzhou Industrial College.

In 1984, it was renamed Hangzhou Junior College Affiliated to Zhejiang university (ZJU).

In 1987, it became independent as Hangzhou Junior College.

In 1992, it was renamed Hangzhou Institute of Applied Engineering.

In 2001, it was renamed Zhejiang University of Science and Technology (Zhejiang Science and Technology College).

In 2009, it successfully became a project construction unit for master's degree authorization.

In 2023, the Zhejiang Provincial Department of Education announced that Zhejiang University of Science and Technology (Zhejiang Science and Technology College) was proposed to be renamed "Zhejiang University of Science & Technology".

On December 14, 2023, the Ministry of Education officially agreed to rename Zhejiang University of Science and Technology (Zhejiang Science and Technology College) to Zhejiang University of Science & Technology.

== Administration ==
=== Schools and Departments ===
The university is organized into the following schools and departments.

Schools	Departments
School of Mechanical and Automotive Engineering	Machinery Manufacture Design and Automation; Material Shaping and Controlling Engineering; Automotive Engineering
School of Automation and Electric Engineering	Automation Electrical Engineering and Automation; Measurement Technology and Instruments; Intelligent Architecture; Electrical Technology
School of Information and Electronic Engineering	Digital Media Technology; Computer Science and Technology; Electronic Information Science and Technology; Electronic Information Engineering; Communication Engineering; Educational Technology
School of Civil Engineering and Architecture	Civil Engineering; City Construction Planning; Water-supply and Drainage Engineering; Architecture
School of Biological and Chemical Engineering	Chemical Engineering and Technique; Food Science and Engineering; Pharmaceutical Engineering; Biological Engineering; Material Science and Engineering
School of Light Industry	Packaging Engineering; Printing Engineering; Light Chemical Engineering
School of Fashion Design (School of Arts Design)	Arts Design; Fashion Design; Industry Design; Animation
School of Economics and Management	Industry Engineering; Information Management and Information System; International Economy and Business; Logistics Engineering; Marketing
School of Sciences	Information and Computing Science; Applied Physics Applied Mathematics Applied Statistics
School of Foreign Languages	English Language
Chinese-German Institute	German Language
School of Humanities	Chinese Language and Literature

== Academic ==
The university currently has 1,620 staff members on its regular payroll and 1,240 full-time teachers, including more than 520 teachers with senior professional titles. Teachers with doctoral degrees account for 56%, teachers with more than 6 months of overseas academic experience account for more than 30%, and teachers with both theoretical and practical teaching abilities account for more than 40%. Among them, those with a master's degree or above account for 85%, and those with enterprise practice experience account for more than 40%. There are 2 young and middle-aged experts with outstanding contributions at the provincial level, 61 selected for the provincial "151 Talent Project," 14 provincial-level young and middle-aged academic leaders in universities, and 4 provincial-level research or teaching teams.

The university currently has 6 provincial first-class disciplines and 15 discipline and research platforms at or above the provincial and ministerial level, including provincial key laboratories. In recent years, it has undertaken more than 100 national science and technology plan projects and National Natural Science Foundation projects, and has won more than 30 scientific research awards at or above the provincial and ministerial level, including 2 national science and technology awards. It currently has 8 national-level teaching platforms, including a National Engineering Practice Education Center, and 16 provincial and ministerial-level teaching platforms, including a provincial talent training model innovation experimental zone, as well as 3 provincial-level teaching teams. It currently has 5 national-level majors, including national first-class undergraduate majors, 28 provincial-level majors, and 8 majors have passed professional accreditation. There are 45 courses at or above the provincial and ministerial level, including national excellent courses. There are 29 national and provincial planned textbooks (projects). It has won 2 national teaching achievement awards and 4 first prizes for provincial teaching achievements.

== Internacional Exchange ==
The university has a history of several decades of foreign cooperation and exchange and is characterized by its internationalized education. It is a pilot institution designated by the Ministry of Education for Sino-German cooperative training of higher applied talents. In 1985, Zhejiang Province and the German state of Lower Saxony signed an agreement to jointly build the university. In 1990, the Chinese and German governments officially exchanged notes and began a government-level cooperative project to build the university. Since 2000, it has successively carried out Sino-German "2+3" joint undergraduate training programs with 7 German universities of applied sciences, including Hochschule Hannover. The "Sino-German Forum: Cultivation of High-Level Applied Talents," initiated by the university, has had a considerable impact among Chinese and German universities, and the university is the forum base construction unit designated by the Ministry of Education. The university has also cooperated with Babes-Bolyai University in Cluj, Romania, and Erfurt University of Applied Sciences in Germany to establish Confucius Institutes. During the G20 Hangzhou Summit, German Chancellor Merkel expressed appreciation for the achievements of the university's Sino-German cooperation.
