= Communication University of Zhejiang =

Public college in Hangzhou, Zhejiang, China

- 浙江传媒学院
- Former names: Zhejiang University of Media and Communications
- Type: Public college
- Established: 1978
- Students: ~14,500
- Location: Hangzhou, Zhejiang, China
- Campus: Urban
- Website: www.cuz.edu.cn

The Communication University of Zhejiang (CUZ) is a public college in Hangzhou, Zhejiang, China. It is affiliated with Zhejiang Provincial People's Government, and co-funded by the National Radio and Television Administration and the Province of Zhejiang.

The CUZ has two campuses, one in Xiasha Subdistrict, Hangzhou, and one in Wuzhen, Tongxiang, together covering an area of 87 hectares with a total construction area of 642,000 square meters. It has 14 colleges/schools, with more than 13,700 undergraduate students, 740 graduate students, more than 200 international students, and about 1,400 faculty and staff.
