= Zhejiang Wanli Education Group =

Education company in Zhejiang, China

- Native name: 浙江省万里教育集团
- Company type: Private company
- Founded: 1993
- Headquarters: Ningbo, Zhejiang, China
- Website: wanli.org

Zhejiang Wanli Education Group (浙江省万里教育集团) is a private company located in the city of Ningbo, Zhejiang, China.

== About ==
In June 1993, Zhejiang Wanli Education Group took over an engineer school on the verge of bankruptcy and established an international school whose offer ranges from kindergarten to higher education.

In a decade or so, due to a rapidly increasing demand, Zhejiang Wanli Education Group reached an enrollment level of 24,000 students, with a teaching and administrative staff of 2,100 people.

Using a land surface of 3,000 mu (200 hectares), Zhejiang Wanli Education Group built a surface area of 1 million square meters. In the context of the educational reforms and modernization policies, Zhejiang Wanli Education Group claims to be an experimental institution which is implementing a new kind of management model "centered on the students". After achieving a relative level of recognition in primary and secondary education, Zhejiang Wanli Education Group is now trying to upgrade its higher education offer, notably through a joint-venture initiated in 2004 with the University of Nottingham in the UK.

At the moment, Zhejiang Wanli Education Group's higher education offer in the city of Ningbo is divided between the Chinese-speaking and English-speaking campuses which are located in the same district of Yinzhou:

Zhejiang Wanli university (浙江万里学院)

University of Nottingham Ningbo, China (UNNC)

At the provincial level, Zhejiang Wanli Education Group may be compared with similar education groups like Hangzhou's Greentown (浙江绿城教育投资有限公司) which also operates a large network of schools from kindergarten to secondary education.
