= Zhejiang Sci-Tech University =

University in Hangzhou, China

Coordinates: 30.31819°N 120.35123°E

- 浙江理工大学
- Former names: Sericultural Academy; Zhejiang Institute of Science and Technology; Zhejiang Institute of Silk Textile
- Type: Public
- Established: 1897; 129 years ago
- President: Chen Wenxing (陈文兴)
- Faculty: 1,800
- Students: 27,000
- Location: Hangzhou, Zhejiang, China
- Campus: Xiasha, Wenyi
- Website: www.zstu.edu.cn (in English)

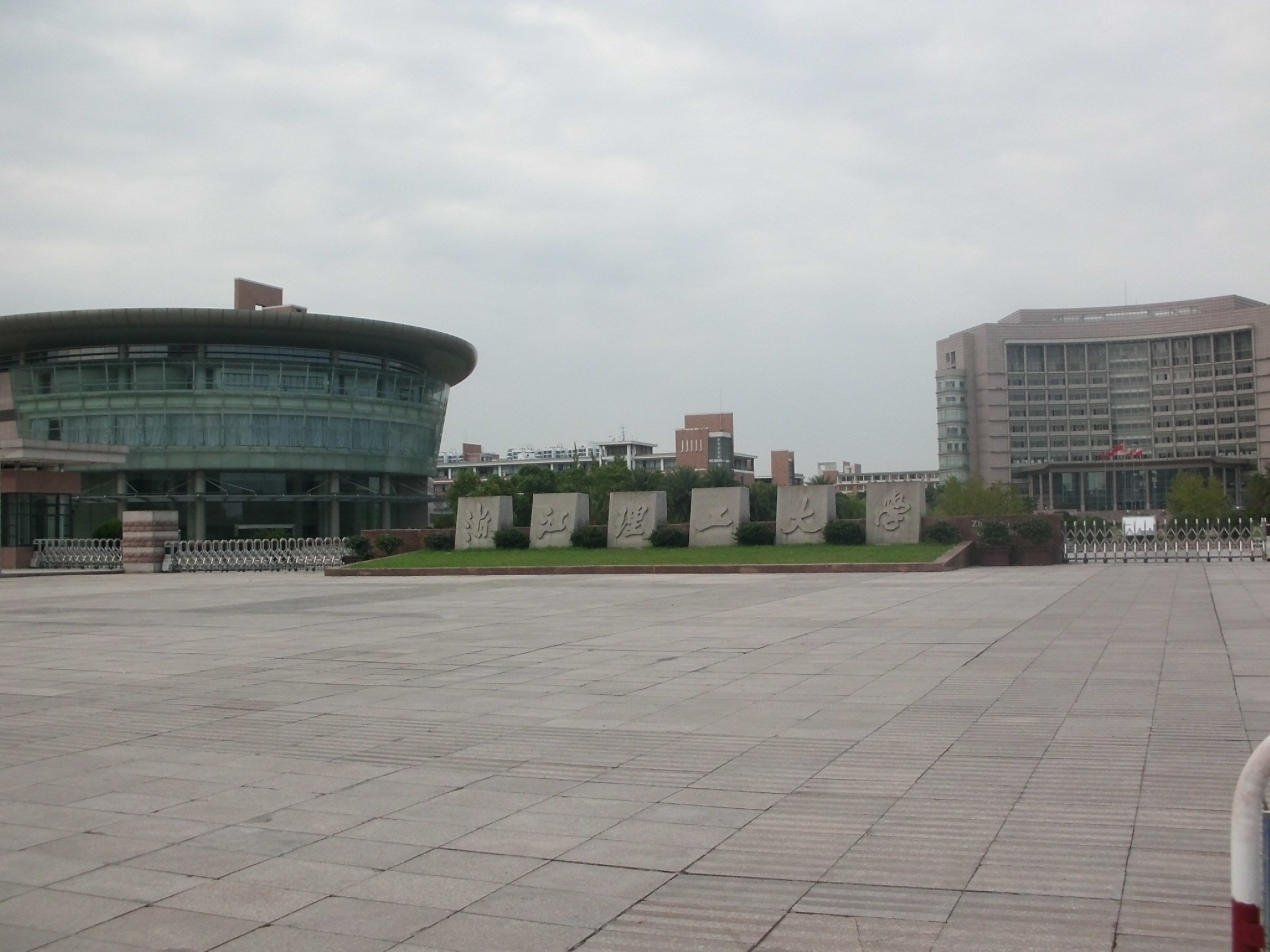
south entrance

Zhejiang Sci-Tech University (ZSTU; Chinese: 浙江理工大学; pinyin: Zhèjiāng lǐgōng dàxué) is a public university in Zhejiang province.

== Rankings ==
University rankings

Global – Overall
- ARWU World: 501-600 (2025)

In 2025, Academic Ranking of World Universities ranked Zhejiang Sci-Tech university within the 501-600 band globally.
