= Zhejiang Ocean University =

University in Zhoushan, Zhejiang, China

- 浙江海洋大学
- Former names: Zhejiang Fishery University (established in 1958); Zhoushan Junior Teachers College (founded in 1978)
- Type: Public university
- Established: 1988
- President: Miao Zhenqing
- Academic staff: 639
- Administrative staff: 1,156
- Students: 14,400
- Postgraduates: 14
- Location: Zhoushan, Zhejiang, China; 29.96293°N 122.18669°E
- Campus: Urban area 100 hectares
- Colours
- Website: zjou.edu.cn
- Location in Zhejiang Zhejiang Ocean University (China)

Zhejiang Ocean University (ZJOU; Chinese: 浙江海洋大学; pinyin: Zhèjiāng hǎiyáng xuéyuàn) is a public university based in Zhoushan city, Zhejiang province, China.

== History ==
The university was created in 1988 from the merger of Zhejiang Fishery University (established in 1958) and Zhoushan Junior Teachers College (founded in 1978).

The university was accredited to offer bachelor's degree programs in 1982 and to provide postgraduate degree programs in 2005.

The university offers disciplines that specialize in the seas and oceans. It allows the development of multi-disciplines including science, agronomy, engineering, literature, medicine, management, teaching and economics.

== Administration ==
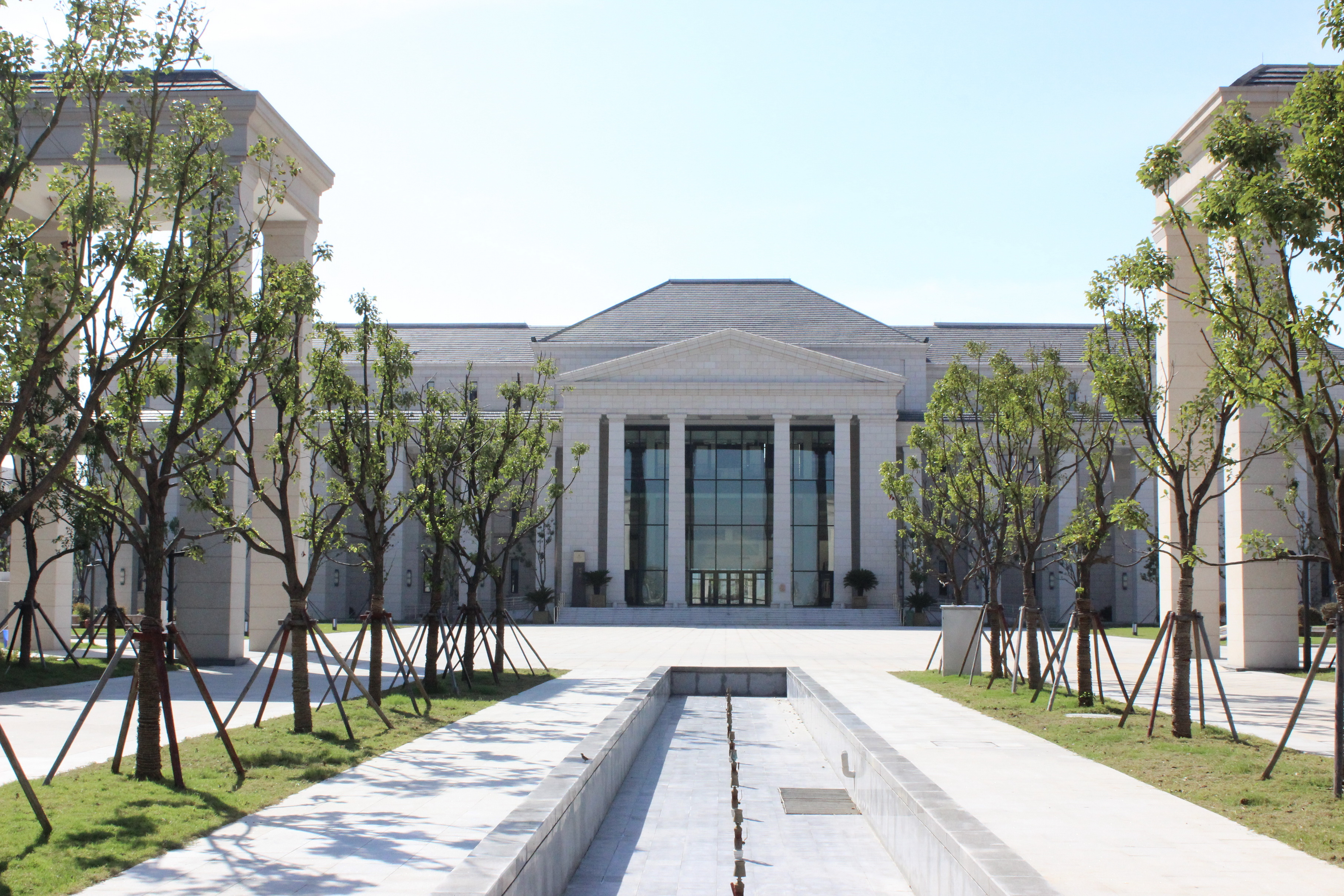
Zhejiang Ocean University Changzhi Island Campus Main Library

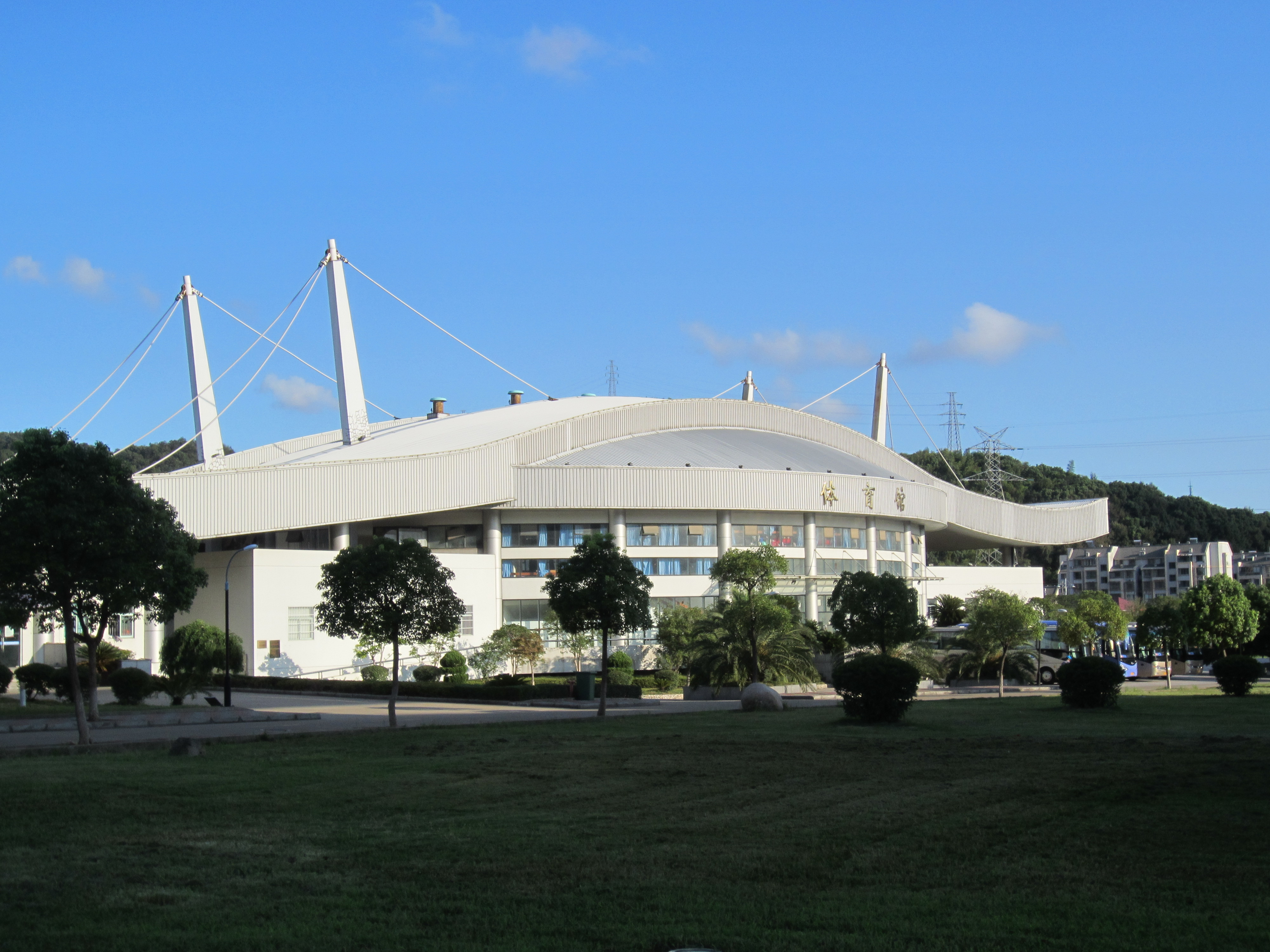
Zhejiang Ocean University Dinghai Campus Gymnasium

=== Colleges and departments ===
The university is organized into the following colleges.

- School of Marine Science
- School of Humanities
- School of Marine Fisheries and Maritime School
- School of Foreign Languages
- School of Naval Architecture and Civil Engineering
- Xiaoshan School of Science and Technology
- School of Electrical and Mechanical Engineering
- Donghai School of Science and Technology (private college)
- School of Food and Pharmacy and Medical School
- Putuo School of Science and Technology
- School of Mathematics, Physics and Information Science
- Department of Physical Education and Art Teaching
- School of Petroleum and Chemical Engineering
- Center for Public Experiment and Computer Network
- School of Business Administration
- School of Continuing Education
- School of Public Administration (Department of Social Science)
- Teacher Development Center
