= China Jiliang University =

University in Hangzhou, China

China Jiliang University (China Institute of Metrology)
- Motto: 精思国计、细量民生
- Type: Public (National)
- Established: 1978
- President: 徐江荣
- Academic staff: about 1,400
- Students: 13,000
- Location: Hangzhou, Zhejiang Province, China
- Campus: Urban, about 2.5 km^{2}
- Website: cjlu.edu.cn (in Chinese) english.cjlu.edu

China Jiliang University (Chinese: 中国计量大学) is a university in Hangzhou, Zhejiang Province that was founded in 1978.

CJLU, formerly the China Institute of Metrology, is the only university qualified to offer bachelor's and master's degrees in Quality Supervision, Inspection and Quarantine in China.

CJLU is the only university in the world dedicated to metrology, standardization, quality supervision, inspection and quarantine. Its predecessor is Hangzhou Metrology School established in 1978 with the approval of the State Metrology Bureau of China. It was upgraded as China Institute of Metrology with the approval of the Ministry of Education of China in 1985. It was renamed as China Jiliang University in 2016. The People's Government of Zhejiang Province and the General Administration of Quality Supervision, Inspection and Quarantine of the People's Republic of China signed an agreement on joint construction of China Jiliang University in 2017. Prof. Song Mingshun is the president of the university.

CJLU is located in the city of Hangzhou, covering an area of 102.27 hectares. CJLU has 52 undergraduate programs, covering 9 discipline categories of engineering, science, management, law, literature, economics, medicine, agronomy and art, 7 master's degree programs of Level-1 disciplines, 25 master's degree programs of Level-2 disciplines, and 4 master of engineering programs. CJLU has 19 colleges (departments) and one independent college. With 15,116 undergraduates and 1,496 postgraduates studying full time on campus, and 5800 undergraduates in the independent college, CJLU has a faculty of 1,276, among whom 683 teachers are with senior professional titles and 92.7% with master's or doctor's degrees.

CJLU enrolls students nationwide, including first-tier students from 17 provinces, municipalities and autonomous regions to ensure high quality of enrollment. In the latest 5 years, the average employment rate of its graduates reached 97.36%, ranking high among all universities in Zhejiang Province. CJLU has established partnership with 46 universities and research institutes in such countries as the United States, the United Kingdom, Germany, France, Canada, Japan, the Republic of Korea, Australia and New Zealand.
