= NingboTech University =

University in Ningbo, China

NingboTech University (Chinese: 浙大宁波理工学院) is a public university which transformed from an independent technical college in 2019. It is located in the Ningbo Higher Education District (宁波高等教育园区), Ningbo, Zhejiang, China. It was founded in June 2001, and mainly focuses on undergraduate education following the course of Zhejiang University.
