= Zhejiang Conservatory of Music =

Provincial public college in Hangzhou, Zhejiang, China

- 浙江音乐学院
- Motto: 事必尽善
- Motto in English: Things must be done well
- Type: Public
- Established: May 8, 2016
- Location: Hangzhou, Zhejiang, China
- Website: http://www.zjcm.edu.cn/

The Zhejiang Conservatory of Music (浙江音乐学院) is a provincial public undergraduate college in Hangzhou, Zhejiang, China. It was established in 2016 and is affiliated with the Province of Zhejiang.

== Overview ==
The entire campus is divided into the North District and the South District. It has the largest music school campus in the world, with two school gates, the North Gate and the South Gate. The Grand Theatre, Concert Hall, Music Building, Dance Building, Drama Building, Library, and Administration Building are all located in the North District Arts District. Comprehensive teaching building, accordion-style gymnasium, piano key-style dormitory building, canteen, etc. are located in the southern living area; the construction unit is Greentown Architectural Design Co., Ltd., and the first construction is the student dormitory building.

The college has 1 library, 1 grand theatre, 3 concert halls, 3 theatres, 102 rehearsal halls, 842 piano rooms, and 6 recording studios. The concert hall can accommodate 800 people, and the grand theatre (with a large theatre, a small theatre, and a movie screening hall, including an IMAX theatre) can accommodate about 1,200 people. Concert halls, grand theatres, and other places will be open to the public.

As of March 2025, the college had 485 full-time faculty members on its official roster. Among them, 60 held full professor positions, 146 held associate professor positions, and 136 held doctoral degrees. Faculty with doctoral degrees accounted for 28.04% of the total full-time faculty, while those holding master's degrees or higher constituted 90.10% of the full-time faculty.

== Professional settings ==
The discipline is mainly art, all of which cover the composition and composition technology theory, musicology, music performance, dance, dance performance and performance under the main discipline of music, and dance, in the existing three Among the first-level disciplines, music and dance are provincial-level first-class disciplines of class A, drama and film studies, and art theory are provincial-level first-class disciplines of class B. The musicology major is a national characteristic major, and the music performance major is a provincial emerging characteristic major. There are a small number of intersecting management, literature, engineering, etc., and nearly 60 majors are planned. By 2020, the number of majors will expand to about 14.
