= University of Nottingham Ningbo China =

Sino-foreign cooperative university in Ningbo, China

- 宁波诺丁汉大学
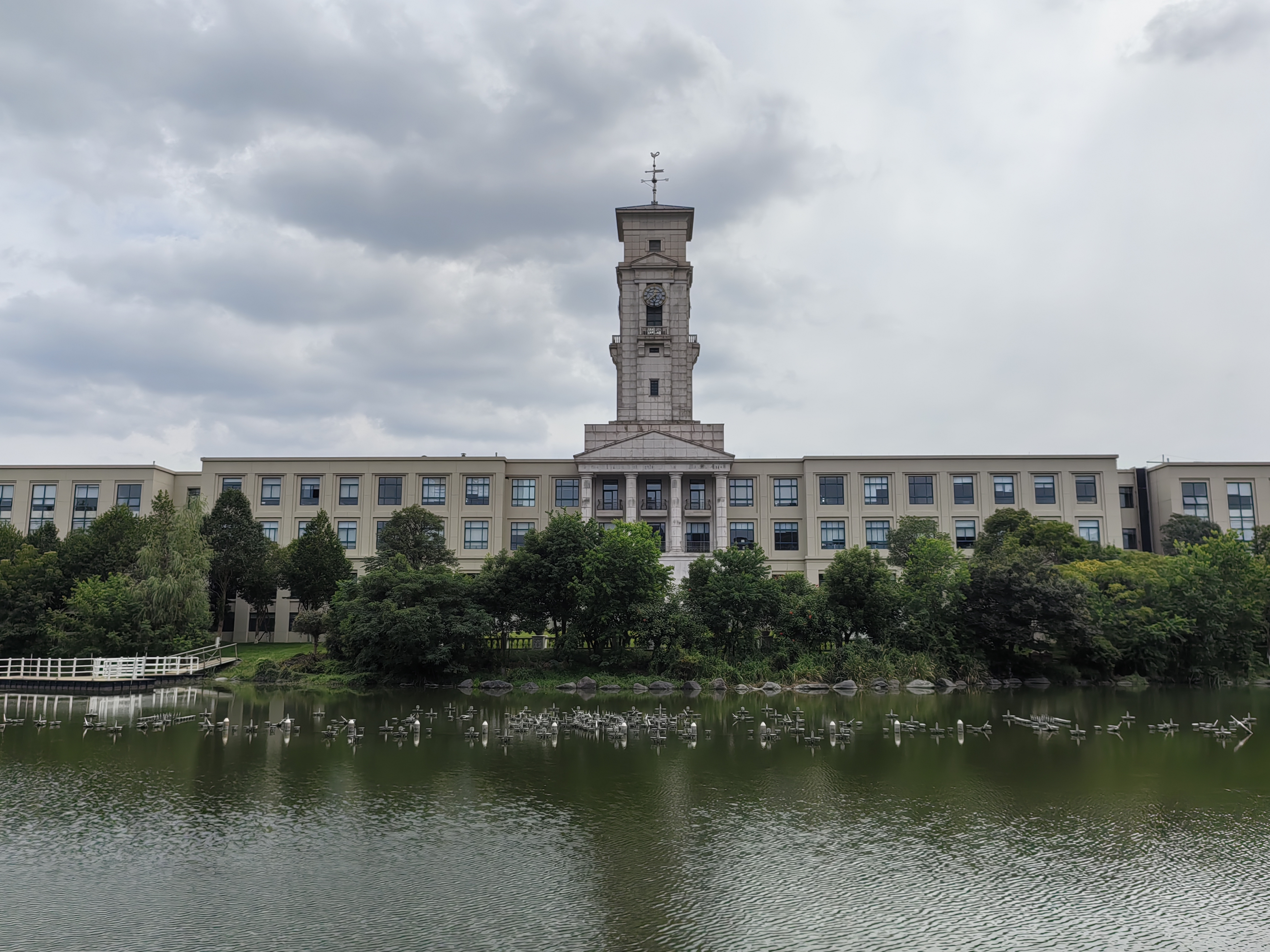
- Trent Building
- Motto: Latin: Sapientia urbs conditur
- Motto in English: "A City is built on Wisdom"
- Type: Joint-venture university
- Established: 2004; 22 years ago
- Parent institution: Zhejiang Wanli University and University of Nottingham
- Chair: Xu Yafen
- Chancellor: Lola Young, Baroness Young of Hornsey
- President: Xincheng Xie
- Party secretary: Shen Weiqi
- Location: 199 Taikang East Road, Ningbo, Zhejiang, 315100, China; 29.8022°N 121.5592°E
Colours
Nottingham Blue and White
- Website: nottingham.edu.cn

Chinese name
- Simplified Chinese: 宁波诺丁汉大学
- Traditional Chinese: 寧波諾丁漢大學
Transcriptions
Standard Mandarin
- Hanyu Pinyin: Níngbō Nuòdīnghàn Dàxué

The University of Nottingham Ningbo China (UNNC) is a Sino-foreign cooperative university in Ningbo, Zhejiang, China. It was established in 2004 by a partnership between the University of Nottingham and Zhejiang Wanli University.

The university is recognized by the Ministry of Education of China as an independent legal entity. The University of Nottingham considers UNNC as a campus of the University of Nottingham.

== History ==
The University of Nottingham partnered with the Wanli Education Group, which managed Zhejiang Wanli University and operated in the Ningbo Higher Educational Zone. An agreement to establish the campus was signed in October 2003, followed by a joint venture agreement in March 2004. The Chinese Ministry of Education gave official approval shortly after, making UNNC the first joint-venture university to obtain legal status as an independent campus in China.

UNNC began operations in September 2004 with its first cohort of 254 students from Zhejiang province, initially operating from temporary premises within Zhejiang Wanli University. Construction on a purpose-built 144-acre campus began in April 2004 and was completed in time for the second intake of students in September 2005. The campus was formally opened on 23 February 2006 by British Deputy Prime Minister John Prescott, in the presence of Chinese education minister Zhou Ji and State Counsellor Chen Zhili.

At the end of 2012, the British Quality Assurance Agency for Higher Education (QAA) went to the University of Nottingham Ningbo China for a quality assessment. In May 2013, QAA released the Quality Assessment report on the university and concluded that the academic level of University of Nottingham Ningbo China and the quality of students were consistent with the University of Nottingham in the United Kingdom. UNNC taught in English, and the degrees awarded to students are University of Nottingham degrees.

In June 2024, UNNC signed an agreement with the Zhejiang international communication center.

== Controversies ==
In December 2007, founding Provost Ian Gow OBE published an article in a discussion paper titled 'British Universities in China: The Reality Beyond the Rhetoric'. The article, drawing on his experience as founding Provost of UNNC, cautioned British universities that they must acquire a more thorough understanding of Chinese higher education policy if they were to succeed in building strategic alliances over the long-term, especially in light of China's growing presence as a major educational hub and research and development power.

A statement was issued by Vice-Chancellor Colin Campbell distancing the university from Professor Gow's position, criticising an article by The Guardian for a misleading assessment of Professor Gow's article. Another response was subsequently published in The Guardian.

In 2018, Stephen Morgan, who served as Nottingham Ningbo's associate provost since 2016, was removed from its management board for criticising the 19th National Congress of the Chinese Communist Party and being a critic of broader Chinese Communist Party-backed initiatives in the university, but remained on the faculty.

== See also ==
- University of Nottingham
- University of Nottingham Malaysia Campus
