= Zhejiang Gongshang University =

Provincial public university in Hangzhou, Zhejiang, China

Coordinates: 29°45′29.07″N 119°38′16.73″E

- 浙江工商大学
- Motto: 诚 毅 勤 朴 (Trustworthiness, Tenacity, Diligence, Tranquillity)
- Type: public
- Established: 1911; 115 years ago
- President: Chen Shoucan (陈寿灿)
- Location: Hangzhou, Zhejiang, China
- Website: www.zjgsu.edu.cn

Zhejiang Gongshang University (Chinese: 浙江工商大学; lit. 'Zhejiang Industrial and Commercial University') is a provincial public university in Hangzhou, Zhejiang, China. It is affiliated with the province of Zhejiang.

In 2026, the university reported that nine micro-majors had been registered under the Ministry of Education's “Double Thousand Plan”. In the same year, the university reported faculty publications in Journal of the American Statistical Association and Journal of Business & Economic Statistics.

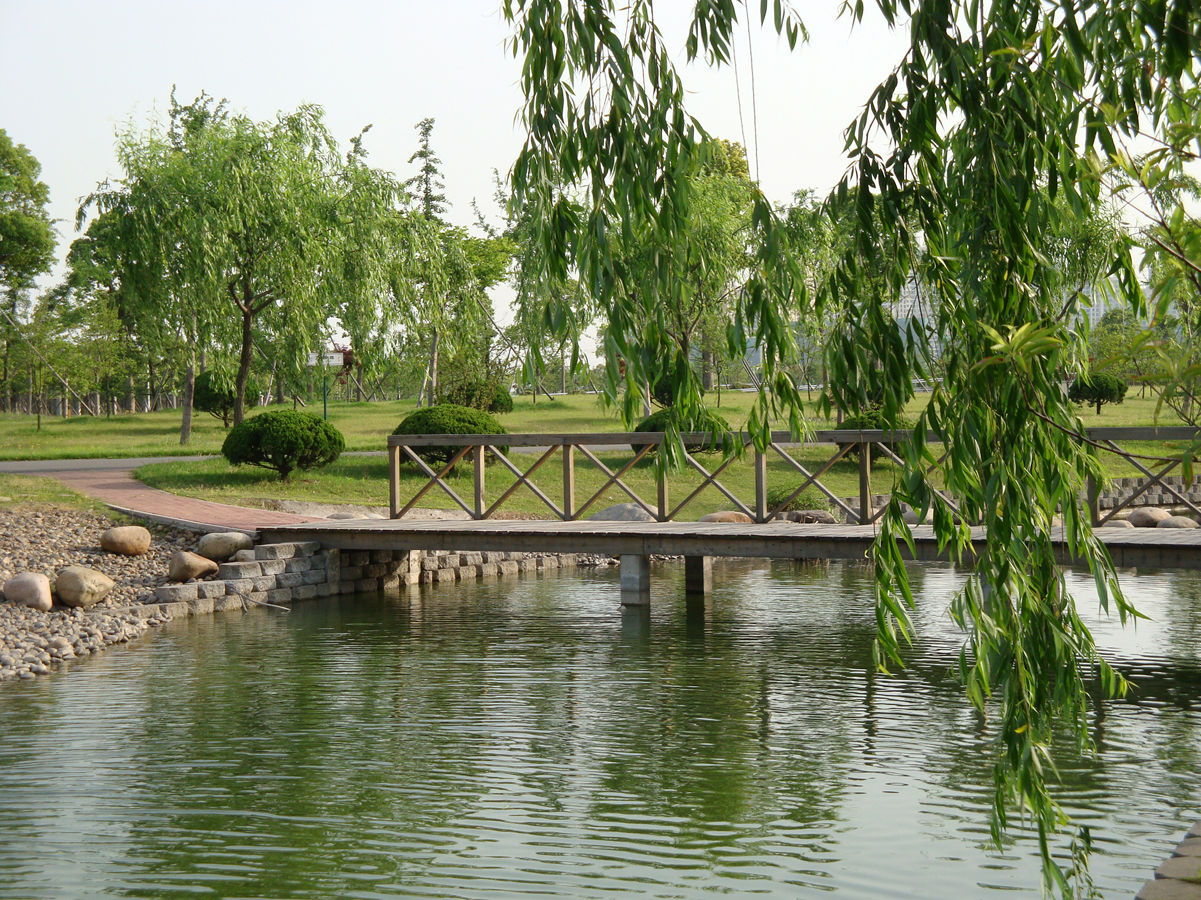
