= Zhejiang Chinese Medical University =

Medical university in Hangzhou, China

- 浙江中医药大学
- Other name: Zhejiang University of Traditional Chinese Medicine
- Former names: Zhejiang Vocational School of Traditional Chinese Medicine; Zhejiang College of Traditional Chinese Medicine
- Motto: MVPI
- Type: Public university
- Established: 1953
- President: Fang Yongsheng
- Students: 5,751 full-time students
- Location: Hangzhou, Zhejiang, China; 30.17275°N 120.149639°E
- Campus: Urban, 27.33 ha (67.5 acres)
- Colours
- Website: www.zcmu.edu.cn/english
- Location in Zhejiang Zhejiang Chinese Medical University (China)

Zhejiang Chinese Medical University (ZJMU; simplified Chinese: 浙江中医药大学; traditional Chinese: 浙江中醫藥大學; pinyin: Zhèjiāng Zhōngyīyào Dàxué) is a comprehensive public university based in Hangzhou city, capital of Zhejiang province, China.

== History ==
Zhejiang Chinese Medical University (ZCMU) was established in 1953 originally as the Zhejiang Vocational School of Traditional Chinese Medicine. It later developed into Zhejiang College of Traditional Chinese Medicine in 1959. It has been accredited to offer master's degrees since 1978 and doctoral degrees since 1998. Since 1987, it also was granted permission to recruit students from Hong Kong, Macau, and Taiwan. 2003 saw the creation of Post-doctoral Research Station and in February 2006, with the approval of Chinese Ministry of Education, the school was renamed as Zhejiang Chinese Medical University (ZCMU). Today, the University strives to become a leading institution where research and teaching are organically integrated.

== Administration ==
=== College programmes ===
The university is organized into the following colleges.

- TCM
- Acu-Moxa and Tuina
- Chinese Herbology
- Clinical Medicine
- Rehabilitation Therapeutics
- Nursing
- Life Science
