= Zhejiang Wanli University =

Private college in Ningbo, Zhejiang, China

- 浙江万里学院
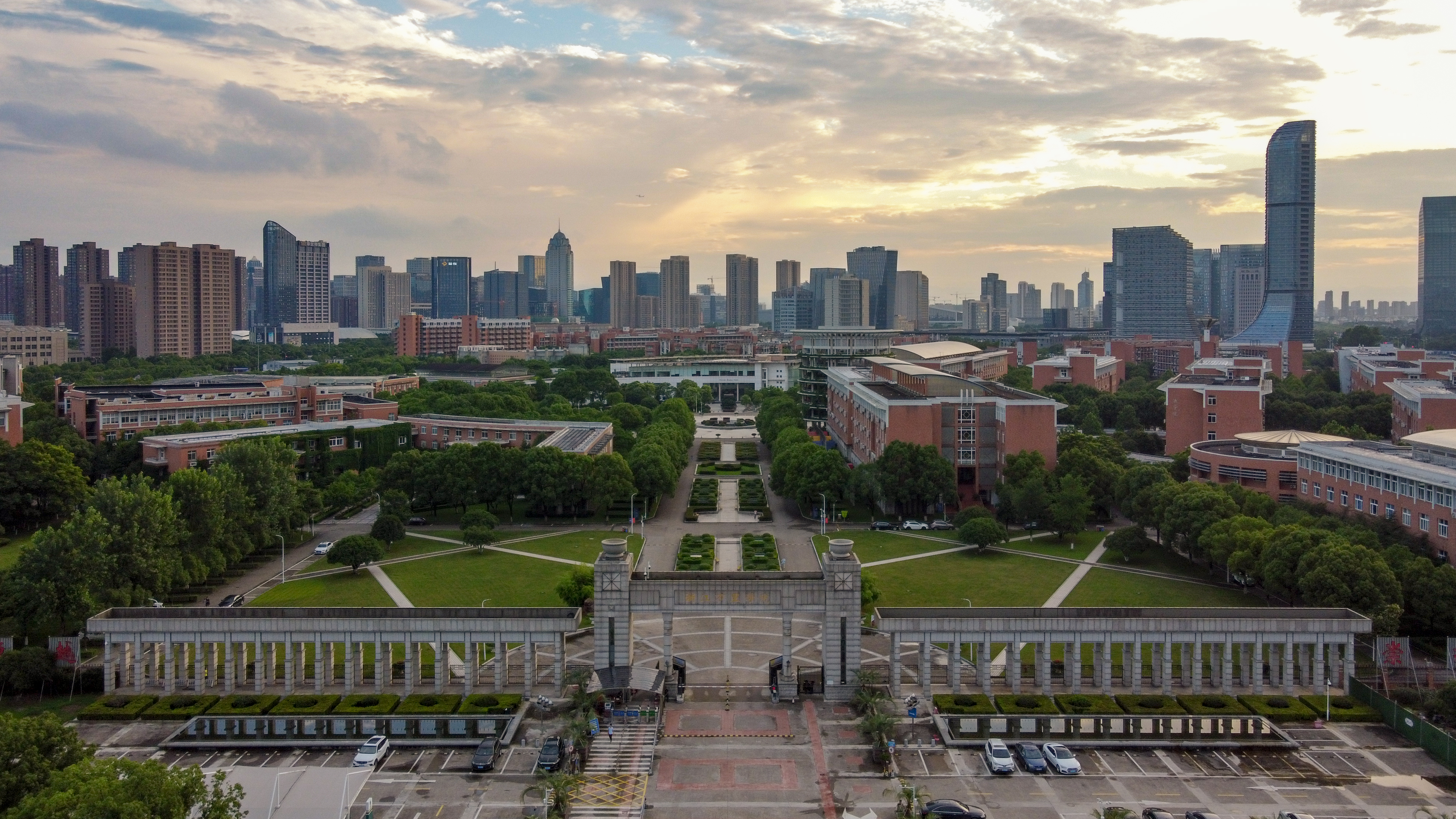
- Former names: Ningbo Regional Agricultural Vocational School; Ningbo Agricultural College; Ningbo Regional Agriculture and Forestry School; Ningbo Regional Agricultural College; Ningbo Branch of Zhejiang Agricultural University; Zhejiang Rural Technical Teachers School; Zhejiang Rural Technical Teachers College; Zhejiang Wanli Vocational Technical College
- Motto: 自强不息，恒志笃行
- Motto in English: "String ahead consistently with Single-mindedness and Moral Integrity"
- Type: Provincial Public University
- Established: 1999 (current form)
- Chancellor: Zhihua Lin（林志华）
- Faculty: 1,400
- Students: 20,000
- Location: Ningbo, Zhejiang, China; 29.81901400°N 121.56733700°E
- Campus: Urban, 95 ha (0.95 km^{2})
- Website: zwu.edu.cn

Chinese name
- Simplified Chinese: 浙江万里学院
- Traditional Chinese: 浙江萬里學院
- Literal meaning: Zhejiang Wanli College
Transcriptions
Standard Mandarin
- Hanyu Pinyin: Zhèjiāng Wànlǐ Xuéyuàn

Zhejiang Wanli University (浙江万里学院; 'Zhejiang Wanli College'), formerly the Ningbo Branch of Zhejiang Agricultural University (浙江农业大学宁波分校), is a public university in Ningbo, Zhejiang, China.

The college is operated by the Zhejiang Wanli Education Group Company (state owned). The university has been specially approved by the Chinese Ministry of Education to pilot a market-oriented operating mechanism. According to the Zhejiang Provincial Department of Education, Zhejiang Wanli University's total allocated budget is 2.36 billion yuan ($341.9 million USD).

According to the 2026 Academic Ranking of World Universities (ARWU), it ranks 312th among Chinese higher education institutions.

== History ==
=== Early history ===
In 1950，Zhejiang Provincial Ningbo Agricultural Technical School was established，the school is located at the site of Wuling College(武岭学院), which was established by Chiang Kai-shek. In 1958, the Ningbo Regional Agricultural Vocational School was established. In 1960, it merged with the Ningbo Regional Institute of Agricultural Sciences and the Ningbo Regional Agricultural Tools Research Institute to form Ningbo Agricultural College. The college was renamed Ningbo Regional Agricultural Vocational School in 1961. In 1971, it merged with Ningbo Forestry School to become the Ningbo Regional Agriculture and Forestry School. This institution was upgraded to Ningbo Regional Agricultural College in 1976. The following year, in 1977, the college became the Ningbo Branch of Zhejiang Agricultural University. In 1984, it was restructured as Zhejiang Rural Technical Teachers College.

=== After privatization ===
In February 1999, the Zhejiang Provincial People's Government implemented a reform to address the college's financial difficulties. As a result, the institution was restructured into a privately managed, government-owned university and renamed Zhejiang Wanli Vocational Technical College (浙江万里职业技术学院) in November. In 2002, the institution was granted "college" (学院) status, was renamed literally "Zhejiang Wanli College" (浙江万里学院) in the Chinese language, and started to provide bachelor's degree programs.

In 2004, the school established a partnership with the University of Nottingham, which led to the foundation of the University of Nottingham Ningbo China. Zhejiang party secretary Xi Jinping attended the campus inauguration ceremony.

In October 2019, the school opened its oversea campus in Hamburg, Germany. In 2021, the school was accredited for three master's degree programs.

During the White Paper Protests, students at Zhejiang Wanli University gained attention on social media and from rallies for posting a protest notice outside their classroom walls. The notice read: "Mourn, do not be numb, do not remain silent, do not turn a blind eye, do not forget." Nearby, a torn poster with the word "Freedom" was displayed. At the bottom, a famous quote from writer Lu Xun was included: "May the youth of China rid themselves of apathy." The notice concluded with the words: "This society must at least give young people hope!"

In June 2024, the school established Ningbo Modern Agricultural College (宁波现代农学院) at the former site of the Zhejiang Agricultural University Ningbo Branch.

== Notable alumni ==
- Li Qiang, 8th premier of the State Council of the People's Republic of China

== See also ==
- Zhejiang Agricultural University
- University of Nottingham Ningbo China
