= Nikong Pool =

- Ningkong Tang
- 泥孔塘 (Chinese)
- Huajiachi Campus, Zhejiang University, Hangzhou, People's Republic of China
- Location within Zhejiang Location within China
- Coordinates: 30°16′08″N 120°11′46″E
- Type: lake

The Nikong Pool or Ningkong Tang (Chinese: 泥孔塘), is a lake in the Huajiachi Campus, Zhejiang University in Hangzhou.

== Introduction ==
In Chinese, ni (泥) means mud and kong (孔) means hole. On the bottom of the lake, there are some holes linking it to the Huajiachi, which is the second largest lake in Hangzhou after the West Lake.

The lake is close to the Huajiachi and in between there is a claybank. On the claybank there is a porch so that people can pass by, have a rest, and view the beautiful landscapes of both the lakes and the campus. People's feeling about this claybank is so similar to the Sudi (苏堤) which is a very famous historic site near the West Lake, so the claybank is named as Little Sudi, because it has a much smaller size.

Whether the lake is formed naturally or artificially is unknown. One guess is that the lake was built in ancient times for serving agricultural irrigation nearby, most likely during the Ming Dynasty.
