= Peace Island (Huajiachi) =

Island in Huajiachi, Hangzhou, China

Peace Island (Chinese: 和平岛), is an island located in Huajiachi, Hangzhou, Zhejiang Province, People's Republic of China.

== Introduction ==
The island is located in Hujiachi (in Huajiachi Campus, Zhejiang University), which is the second largest lake in Hangzhou, after West Lake.

The island was naturally formed, but later enlarged artificially. In the 1980s and 1990s, Chinese pavilions and other traditional structures were built on the island. The island is home to two pavilions, some statues and a grove of trees.

In years past, an annual boat race was held on Hujiachi, and the spectators, cheerleaders and judges would watch from the island.

Essays by Zhejiang University alumni and other Hangzhou writers sometimes mention the island.
