= Zhejiang Agricultural University =

Defunct university in Hangzhou, China

- 浙江农业大学
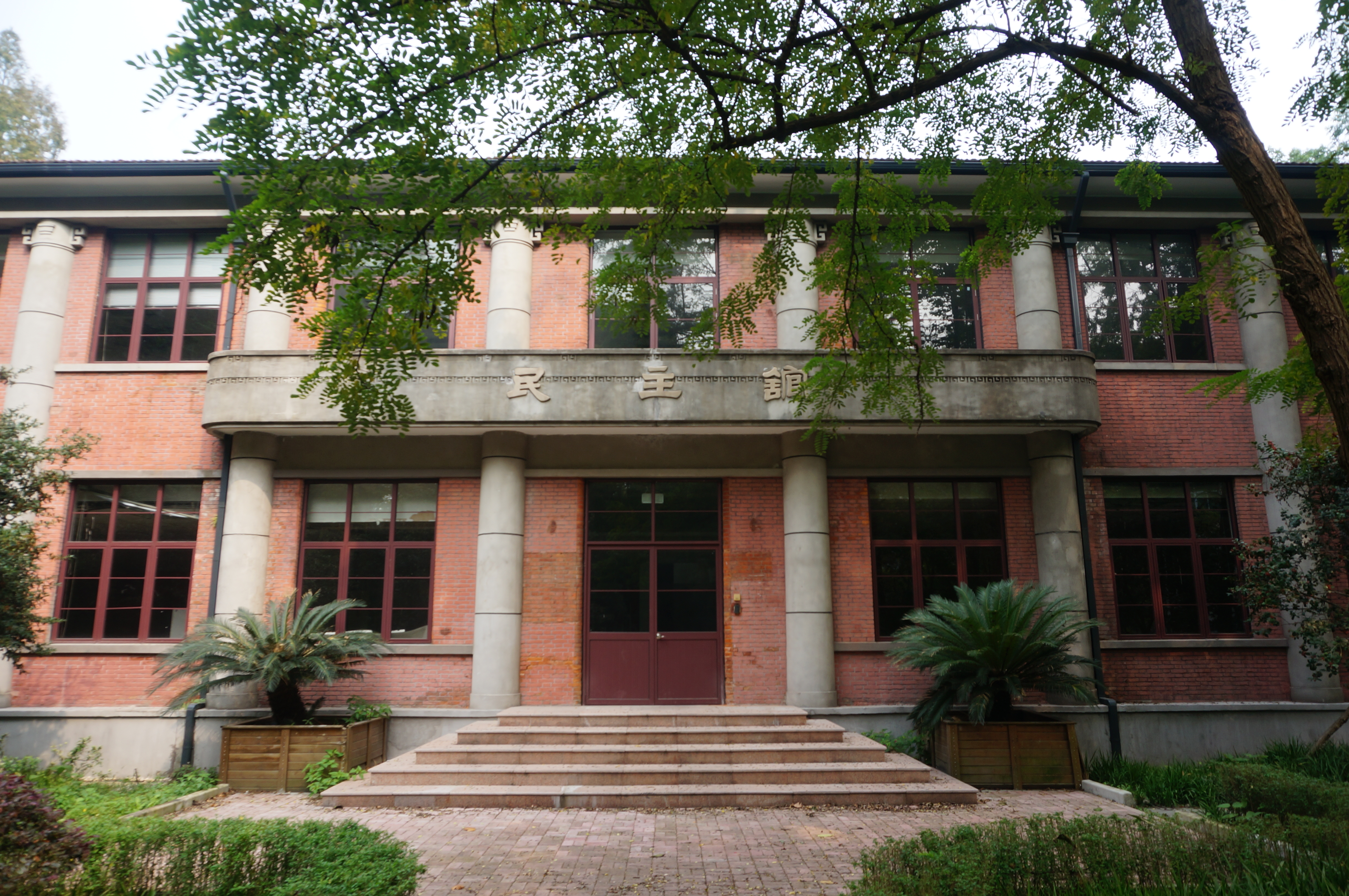
- The Democratic Building in 2017
- Former names: Zhejiang Agricultural University; Chekiang (Zhejiang) Agricultural University; Chekiang (Zhejiang) College of Agriculture
- Motto: 求是、勤朴
- Motto in English: Seeking truth; industrious and plain
- Anniversary: 15 October
- Active: 1952–1998
- Location: 268 Kaixuan Road, Hangzhou, Zhejiang, 310029, China; 30.27292°N 120.19164°E
- Campus: 98.93 hectares (244.5 acres)

Zhejiang Agricultural University (ZAU) was a public university in Hangzhou, Zhejiang, China. Founded as the Zhejiang College of Agriculture in 1952, the university was merged into Zhejiang University in 1998. Its campus now becomes the Huajiachi Campus of Zhejiang University.

== History ==
Founded as Zhejiang Agriculture Teachers' Institution in 1910, the institution went under Zhejiang University in 1927 and was renamed as the College of Agriculture of Zhejiang University in January 1929. In 1928, Prof. Zhong Guanguang at the college founded the first botanic garden in China in Jianqiao, Hangzhou. In 1934, the college, along with the garden, moved to Huajiachi. During the Republican Era, the college was a major hub of students' movements.

In 1952, the College of Agriculture was separated from Zhejiang University to become an independent Zhejiang College of Agriculture, located in Huajiachi, the old campus of Zhejiang University in the 1930s and 1940s. Starting from 1954, the college became among the first universities in China to accept international students.

In February 1960, the college was merged with Tianmu College of Forestry, Zhoushan Fisheries College to form Zhejiang Agricultural University. In 1962, Tianmu College of Forestry was separated from the university and was renamed as Zhejiang College of Forestry in 1966. Zhejiang College of Forestry was again merged into Zhejiang Agricultural University in 1970 and was again separated in 1979.

During the Culture Revolution, despite extensive political chaos and prosecutions, the ZAU faculty continued research such as rice breeding in Hangzhou, Fujian and Hainan. Between 1962 and 1995, the Institute of Nuclear Agricultural Sciences of ZAU released 12 radiation induced 'Zhefu' serial varieties of rice, among which Zhefu 802 was among the most cultivated varieties in China. During 1986–1994, Zhefu 802 was the most extensively planted rice variety, with its cumulative planted area reaching ~ 10.6 million hectares. Its pear breeding programme, starting in 1955, also provided two of the most planted pear varieties in southern China.

After the Culture Revolution, the university restarted recruiting undergraduate and postgraduate students and built new research buildings and labs. Notably, the university founded the first specialised department of agricultural education in China in 1984. The students of ZAU were reported to participate in the 1989 pro-democracy movement, which led to a visit of Li Zemin, the provincial party secretary, on 1 June 1989.

In 1998, the university was merged into Zhejiang University, along with Hangzhou University and Zhejiang Medical University. Most of the university became the Faculty of Agricultural, Life & Environmental Sciences of Zhejiang University. The campus of the university became the Huajiachi Campus of Zhejiang University. The Journal of Zhejiang Agricultural University, an academic journal published by ZAU since 1956, became the Journal of Zhejiang University: Agriculture and Life Sciences.

== See also ==
- Huajiachi Campus, Zhejiang University
