= Puning Temple (Hebei) =

Buddhist temple in Chengde, China

- 普宁寺
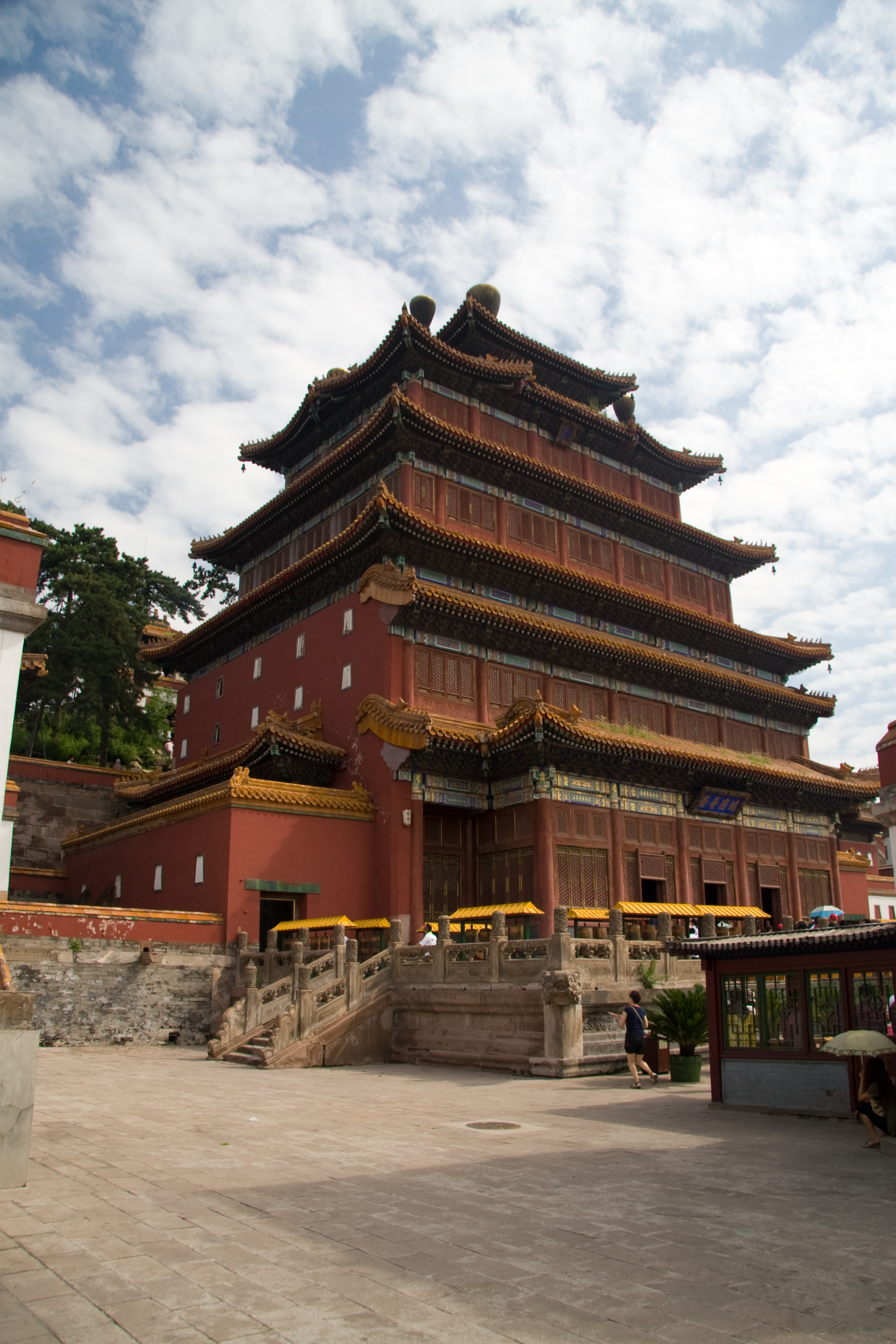
- Puning Temple

- Location within Hebei

Religion
- Affiliation: Buddhism
- Sect: Tibetan Buddhism–Gelug

Location
- Location: Chengde, Hebei, China
- Coordinates: 41°0′50″N 117°56′48″E

Architecture
- Style: Tibetan architecture
- Founder: Qianlong Emperor
- Established: 1755

Puning Temple
- Simplified Chinese: 普宁寺
- Traditional Chinese: 普寧寺
Transcriptions
Standard Mandarin
- Hanyu Pinyin: Pǔníng Sì
- Wade–Giles: P'u-ning Ssu/szu

The Puning Temple (Chinese: 普宁寺; pinyin: Pǔníng Sì; lit. 'Temple of Universal Peace'), commonly called the Big Buddha Temple, is a Buddhist temple complex in Chengde, Hebei province, China. It was built in 1755 during the reign of the Qianlong Emperor in the Qing dynasty. It is near the Chengde Mountain Resort and alongside the equally famed Putuo Zongcheng Temple. Puning is one of the "Eight Outer Temples" of Chengde.

The Puning Temple was modeled after the Samye Monastery, the sacred Buddhist site in Tibet (much as the Putuo Zongcheng Temple was modeled after the Potala Palace in Lhasa). The front temple was constructed in the Chinese style, although the temple complex follows both Chinese and Tibetan architectural styles. The Puning Temple houses the world's tallest wooden sculpture of the Bodhisattva Avalokiteśvara (22.28-meter-high and 110 ton), hence it is often nicknamed the "Big Buddha Temple". The complex features temple halls, pavilions, drum towers and bell towers.

== History ==
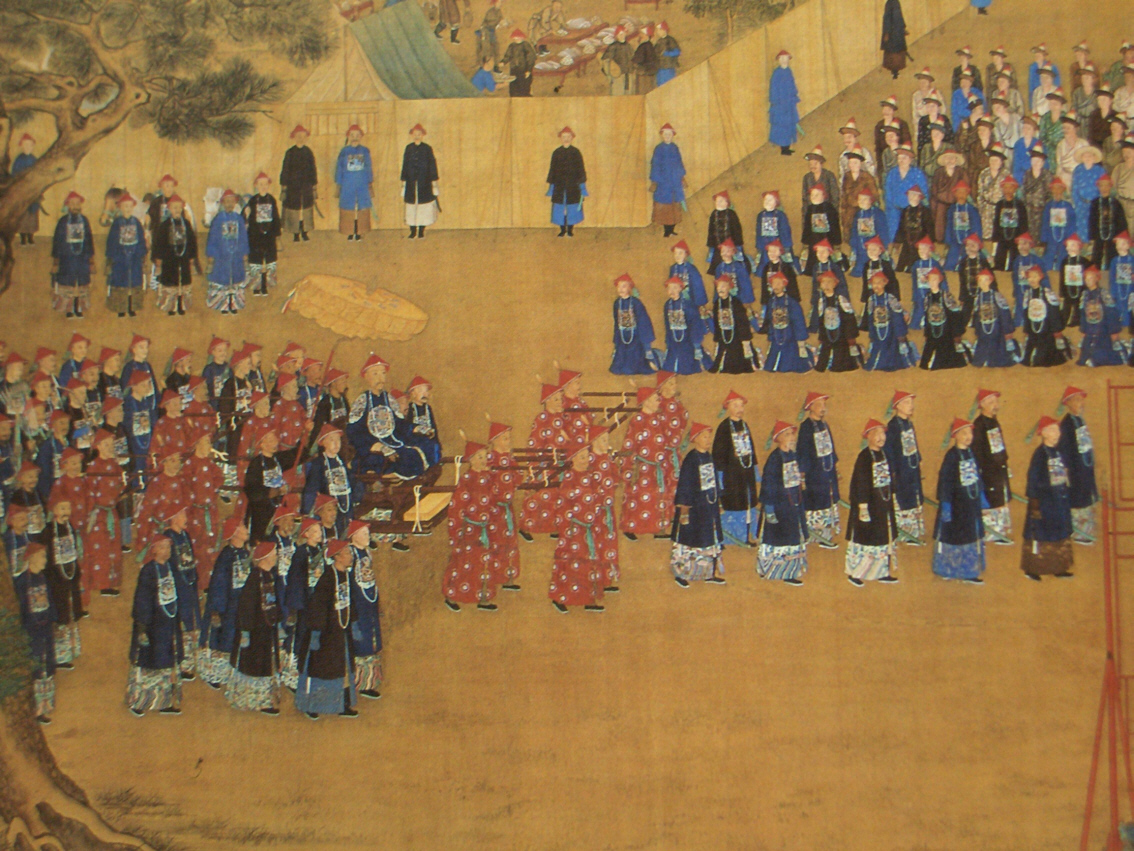
The Qianlong Emperor (r. 1735–1796) touring Chengde.

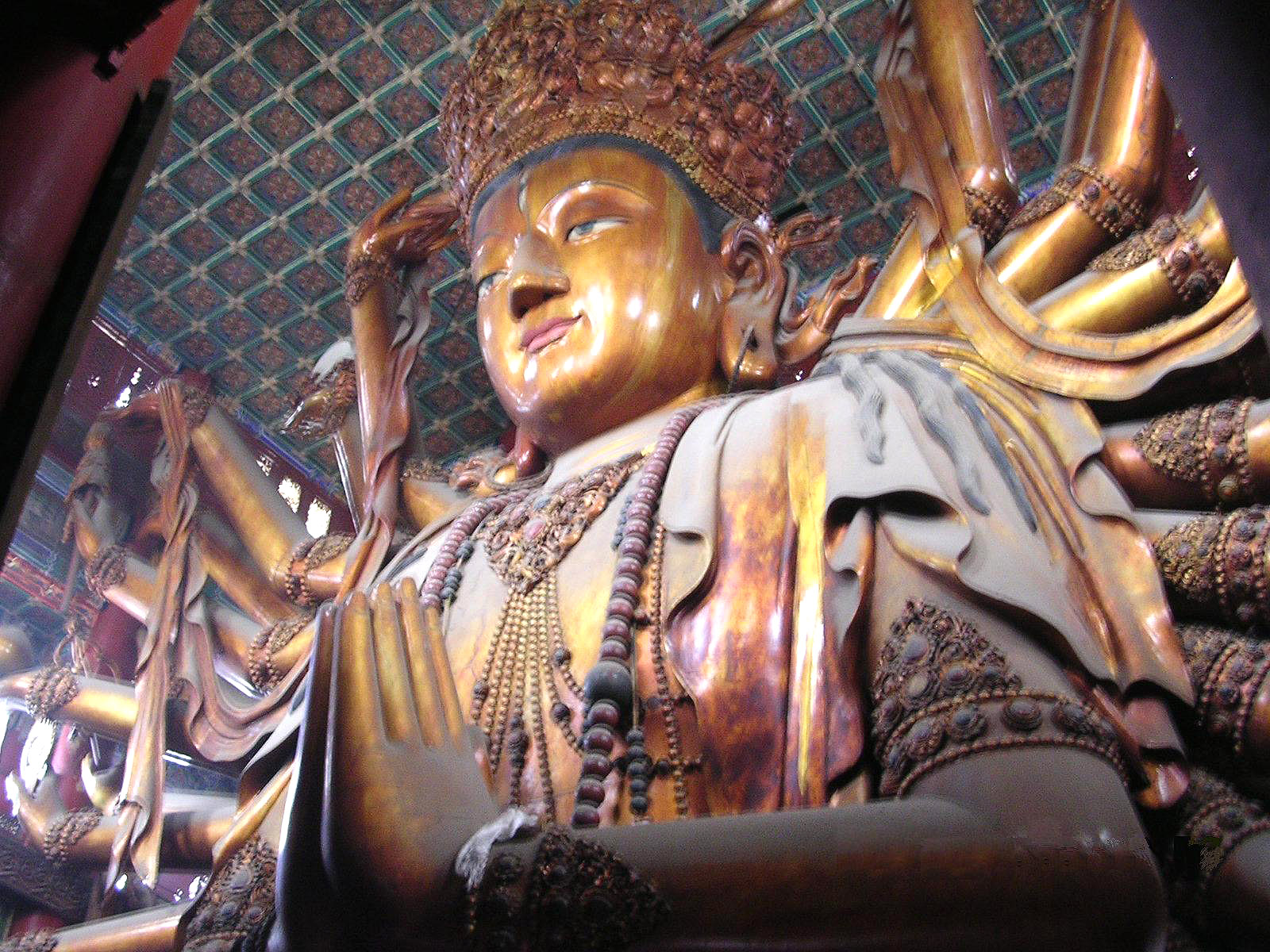
The giant wooden bodhisattva of Puning Temple; click here for a closer look.

Since the 18th century, during the Qing dynasty, the Dzungar people of northwestern modern China (Xinjiang) were engaged in war against Qing empire invasion. The Qianlong Emperor of the Qing dynasty dispatched an army to Yili to suppress their resistance against Qing rule. The Qing army attacked Kulja (Yining) and captured the ruling Dzungar khan. After the conquest, the Qianlong Emperor personally inscribed his writing on a tablet that is in the stele pavilion of the Puning Temple. This stele of 1755, called the Puning Sibei, commemorated the founding of the temple and the victory over the Dzungars. The Qianlong Emperor ordered the building of this new Temple of Universal Peace, a symbol of his ambition to maintain peace among ethnic minorities and a stable environment in the northwestern regions. The historian Waley-Cohen calls Chengde "a crucial location for the exhibition of Manchu power and the representation of Qing imperial knowledge," being the location of the summer capital. Since the Dzungars were followers of Tibetan Buddhism, the temple was built in imitation of Samye monastery in Tibet.

The large wooden Buddhist statue of the Bodhisattva Avalokiteśvara in the main hall of the Puning Temple is one of its most renowned features. It shows a thousand different eyes and a thousand different arms stretched out from its frame (in various sizes). The statue itself is made from five kinds of wood, including pine, cypress, elm, fir, and linden.

As of 1994, the Chengde Mountain Resort and Chengde's Eight Outer Temples (including the Puning Temple) were established as UNESCO World Heritage Sites. Today, the Puning Temple remains a site of tourist attraction and local festivities.

== Gallery ==
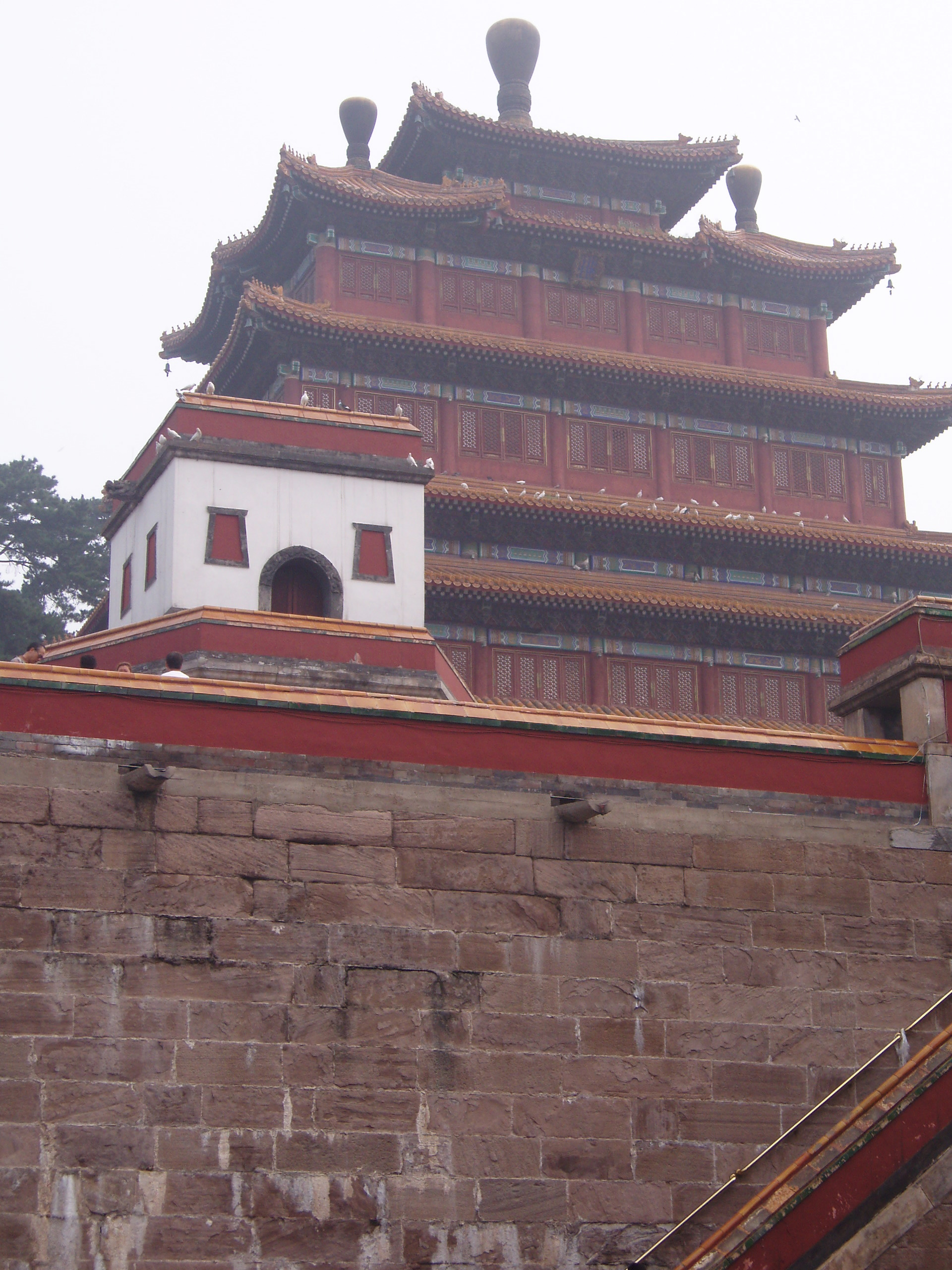
Main hall housing the Bodhisattva

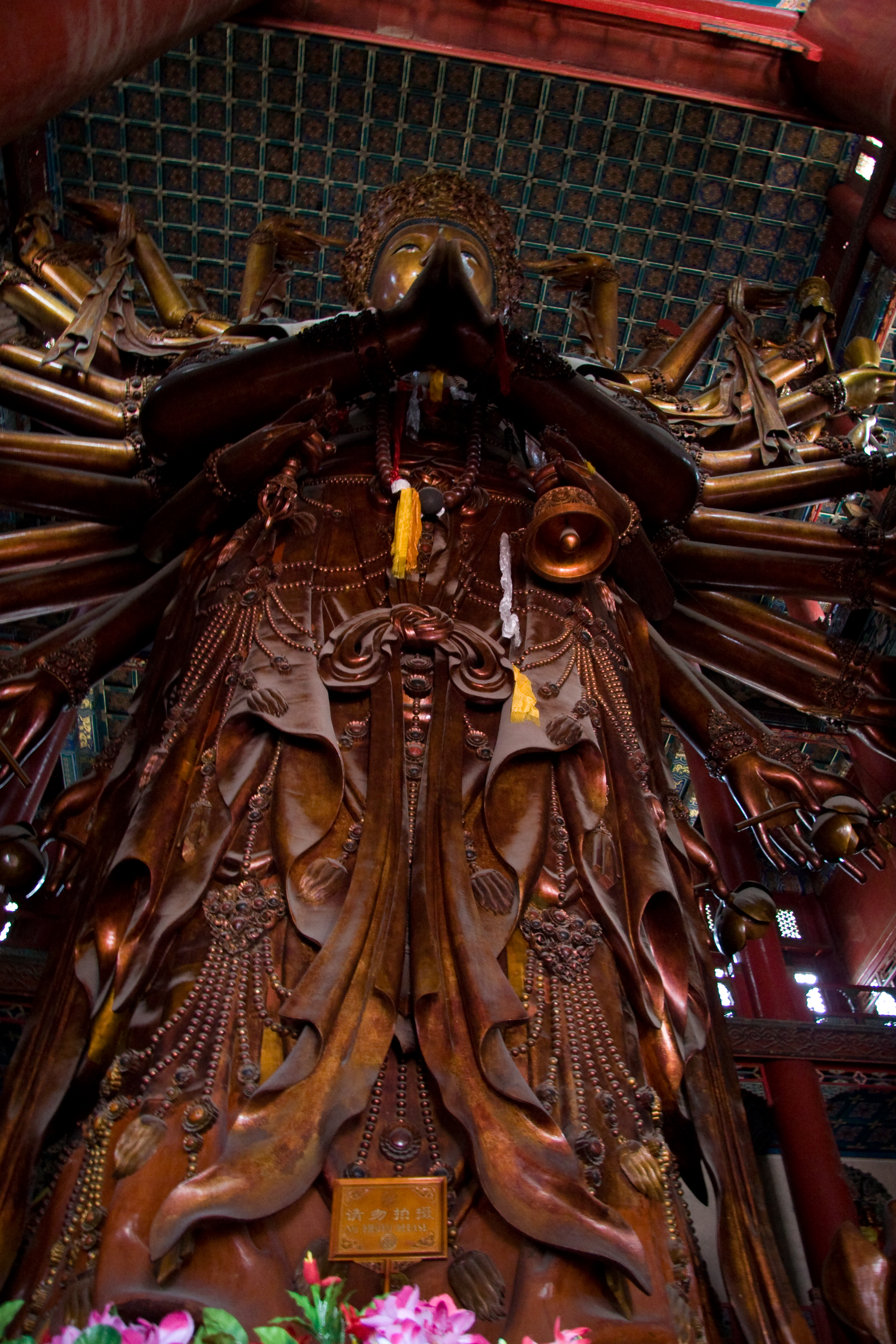
Looking up at the Bodhisattva

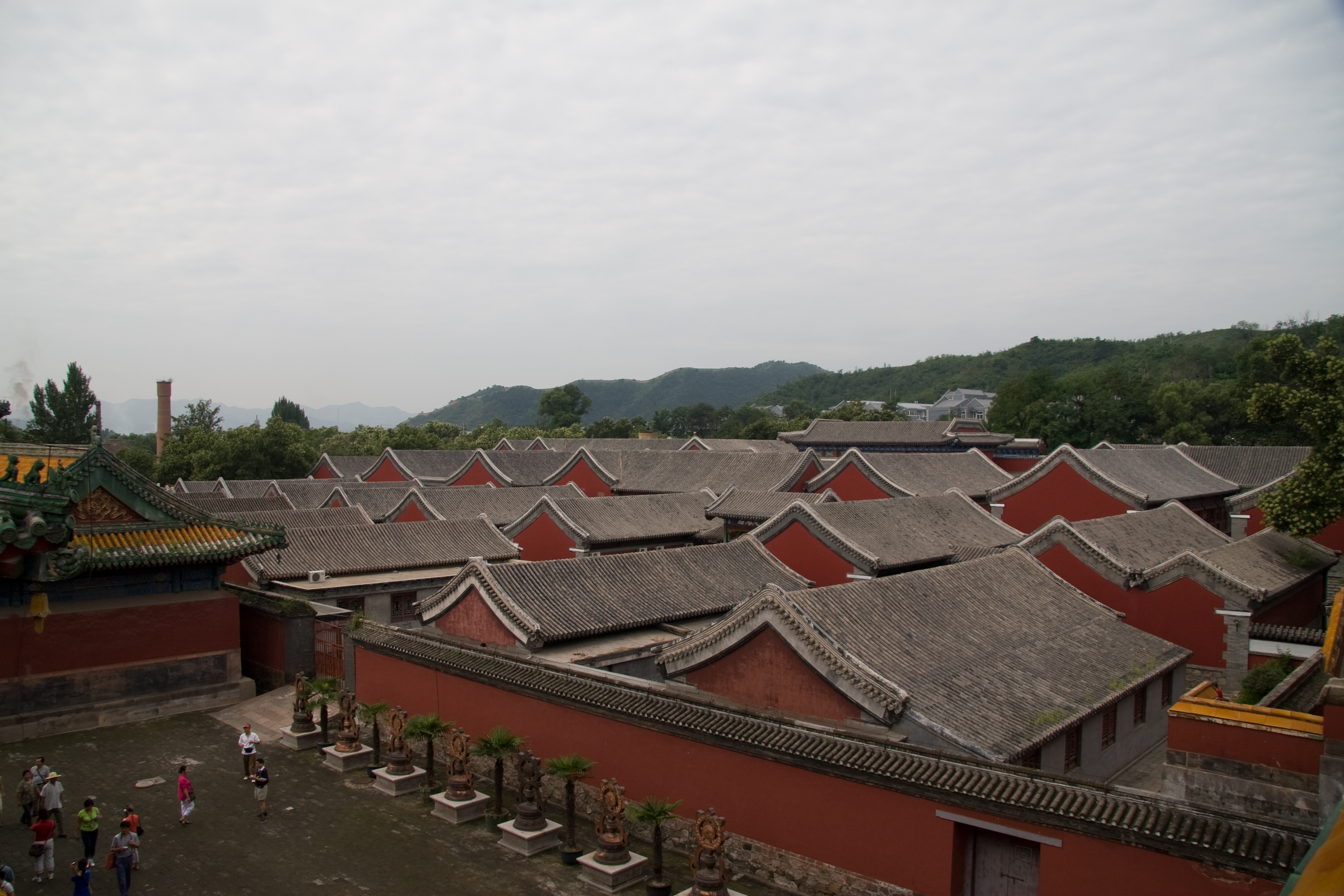
Temple grounds

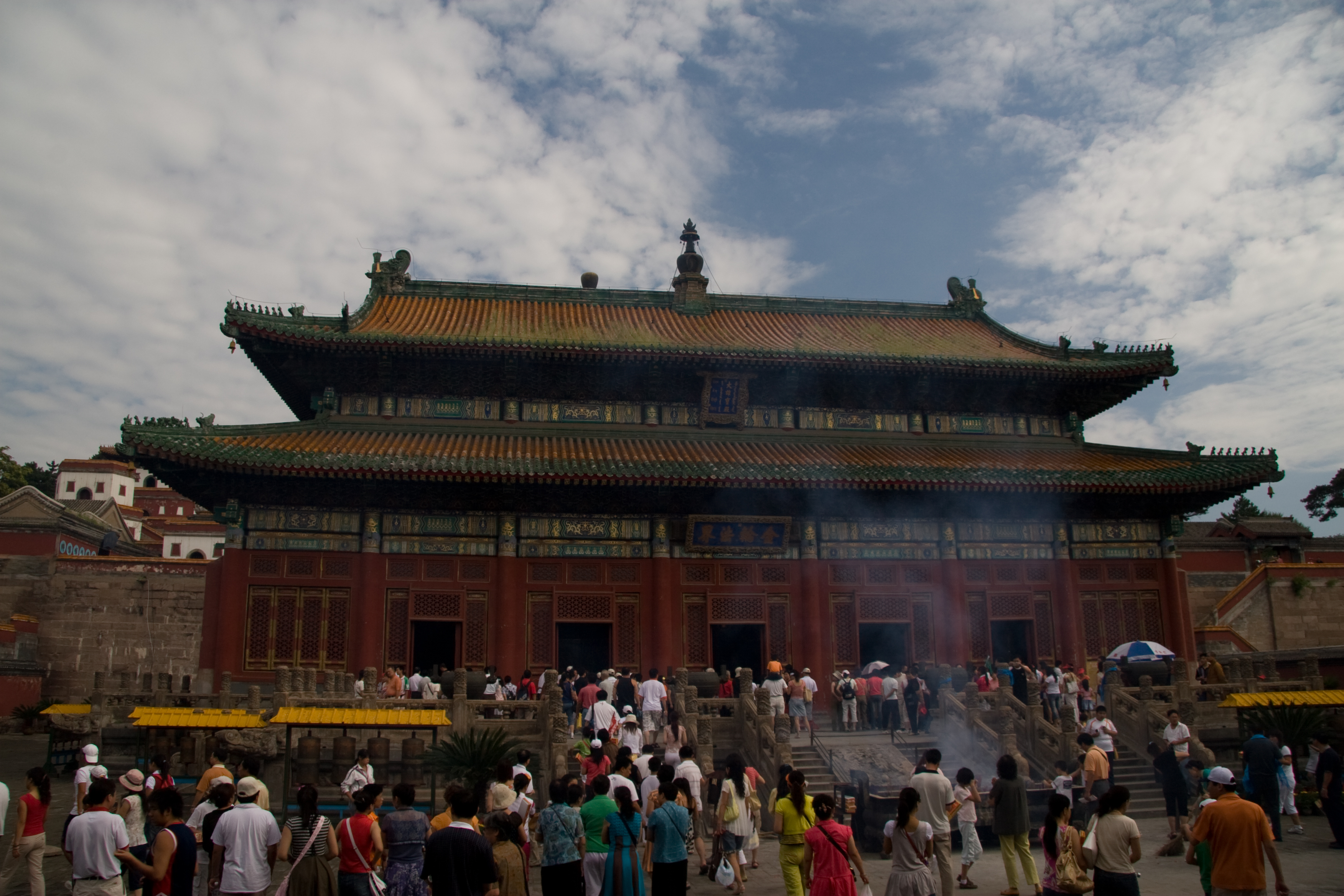
Main temple

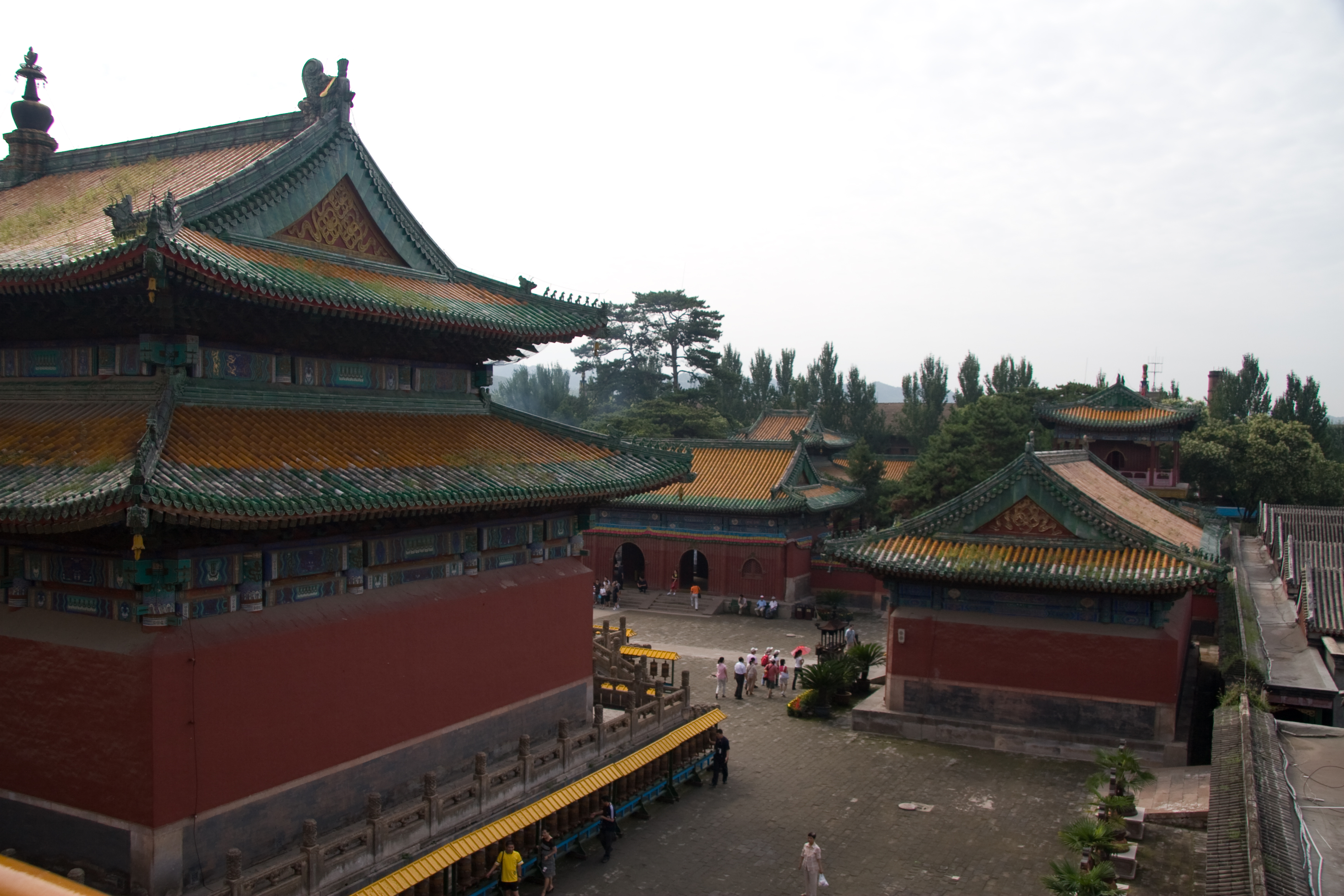
Temple grounds

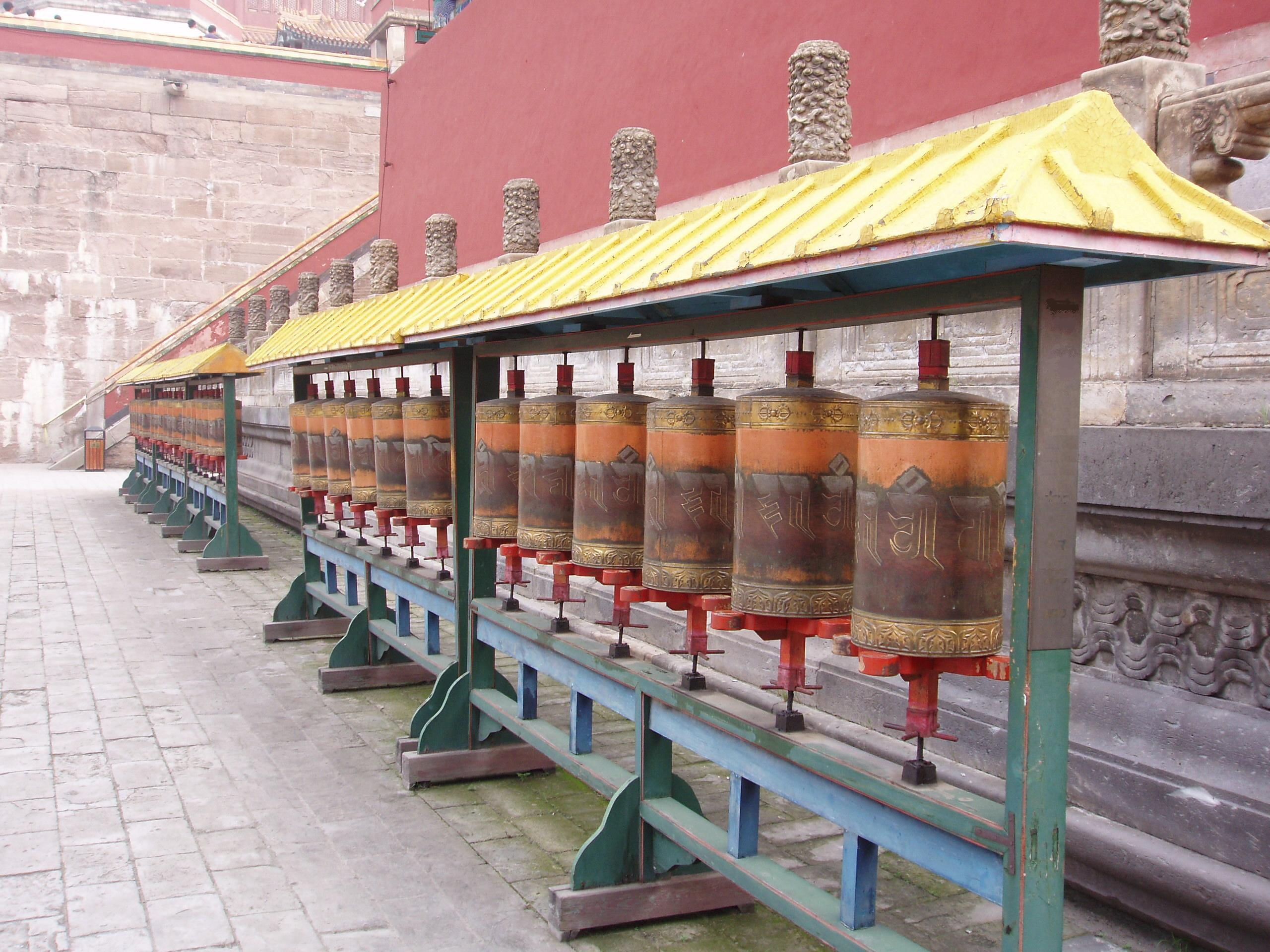
Turning wheels of the Buddha's doctrine at Puning Temple, a modern addition.

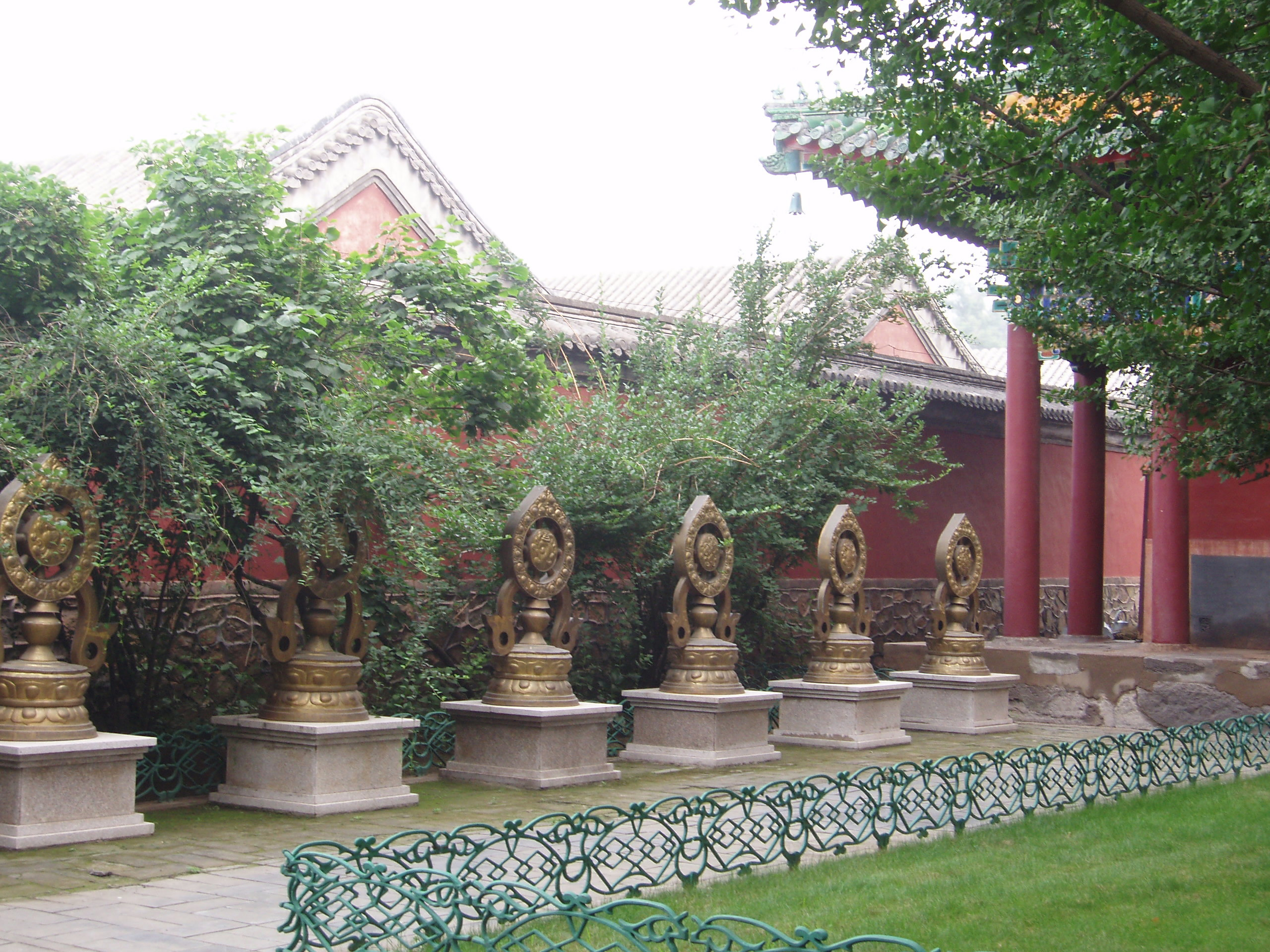
A courtyard of Puning Temple

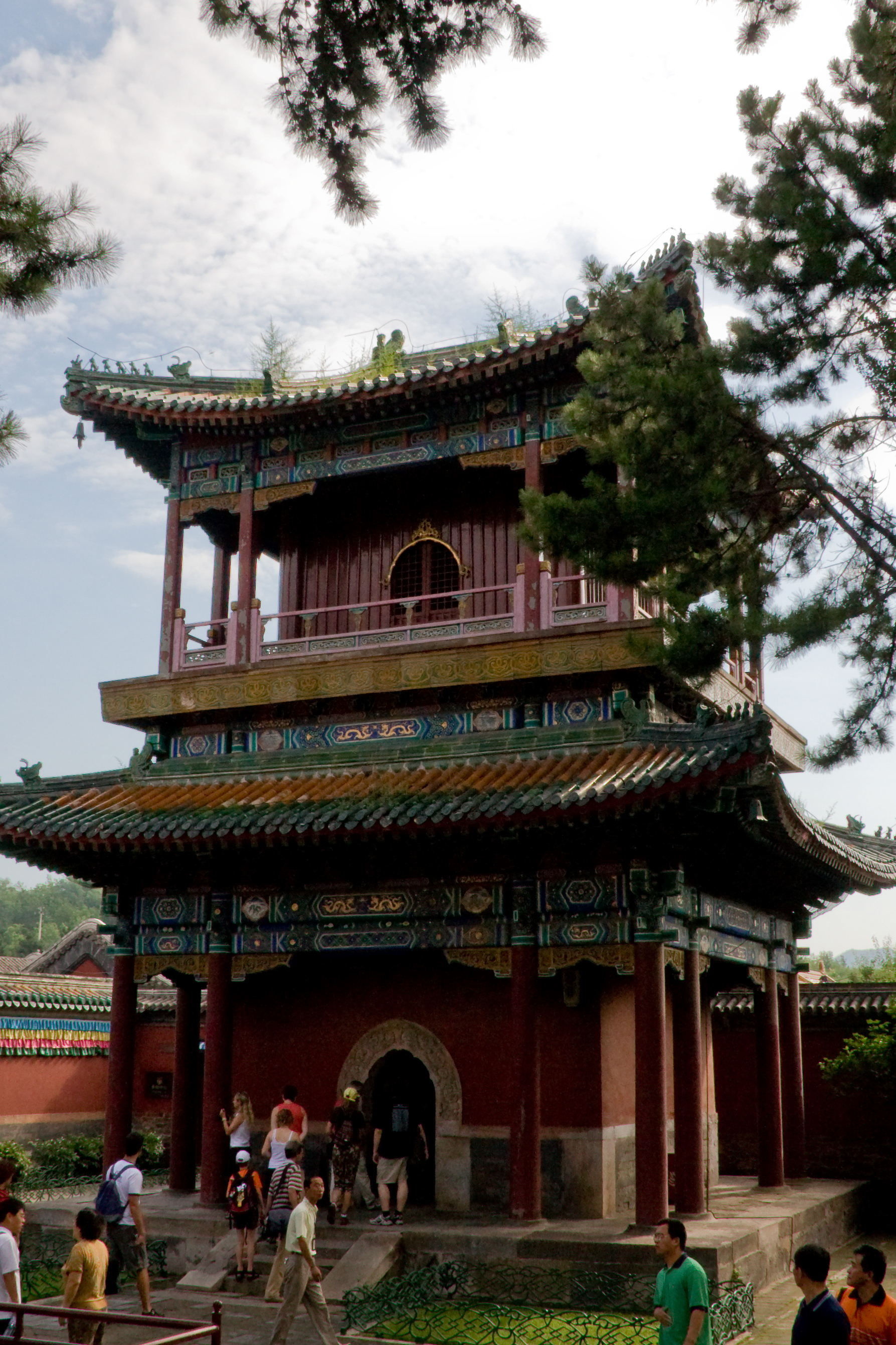
A Chinese pavilion of Puning Temple

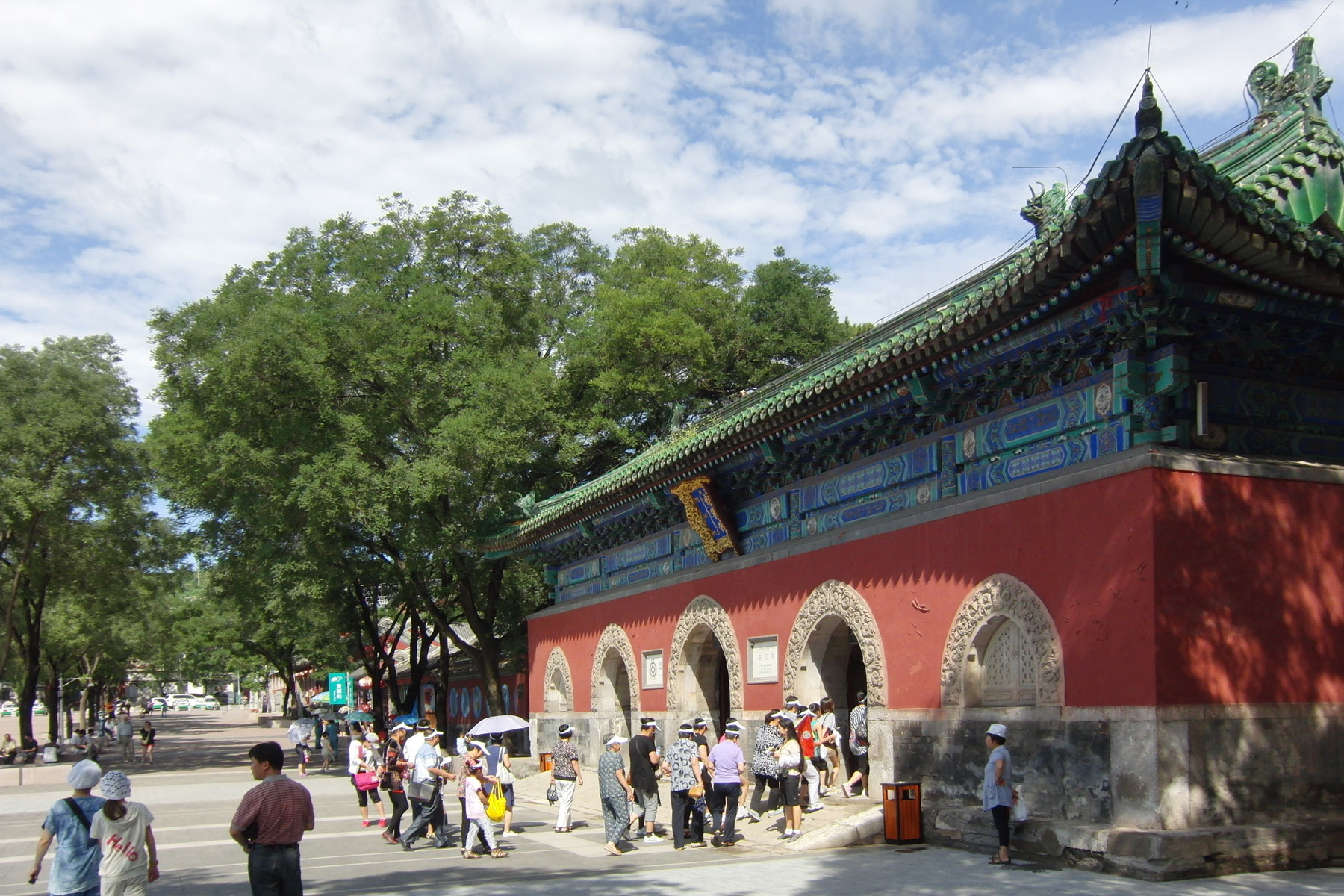
Temple entrance

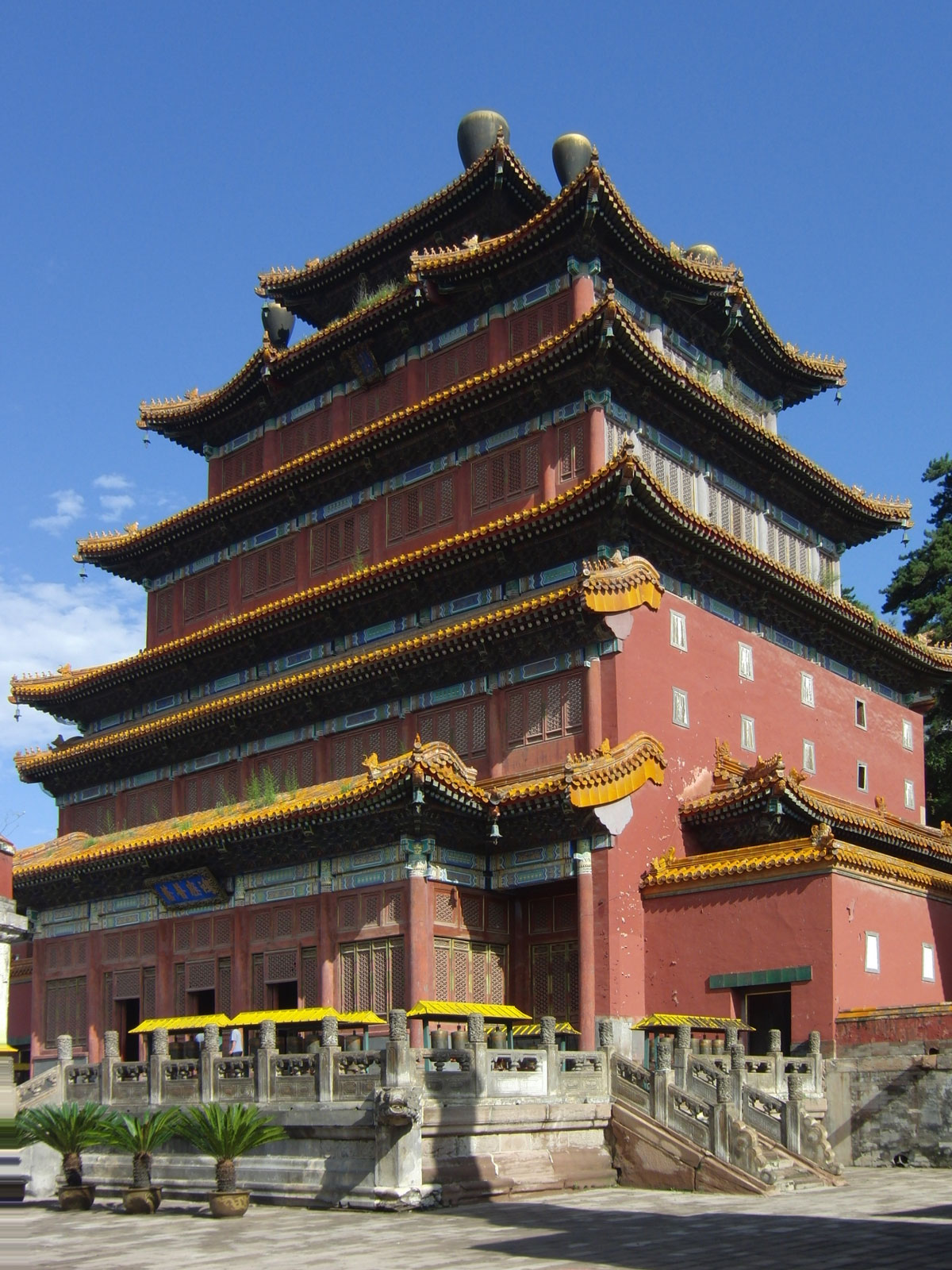
Hall housing the Bodhisattva

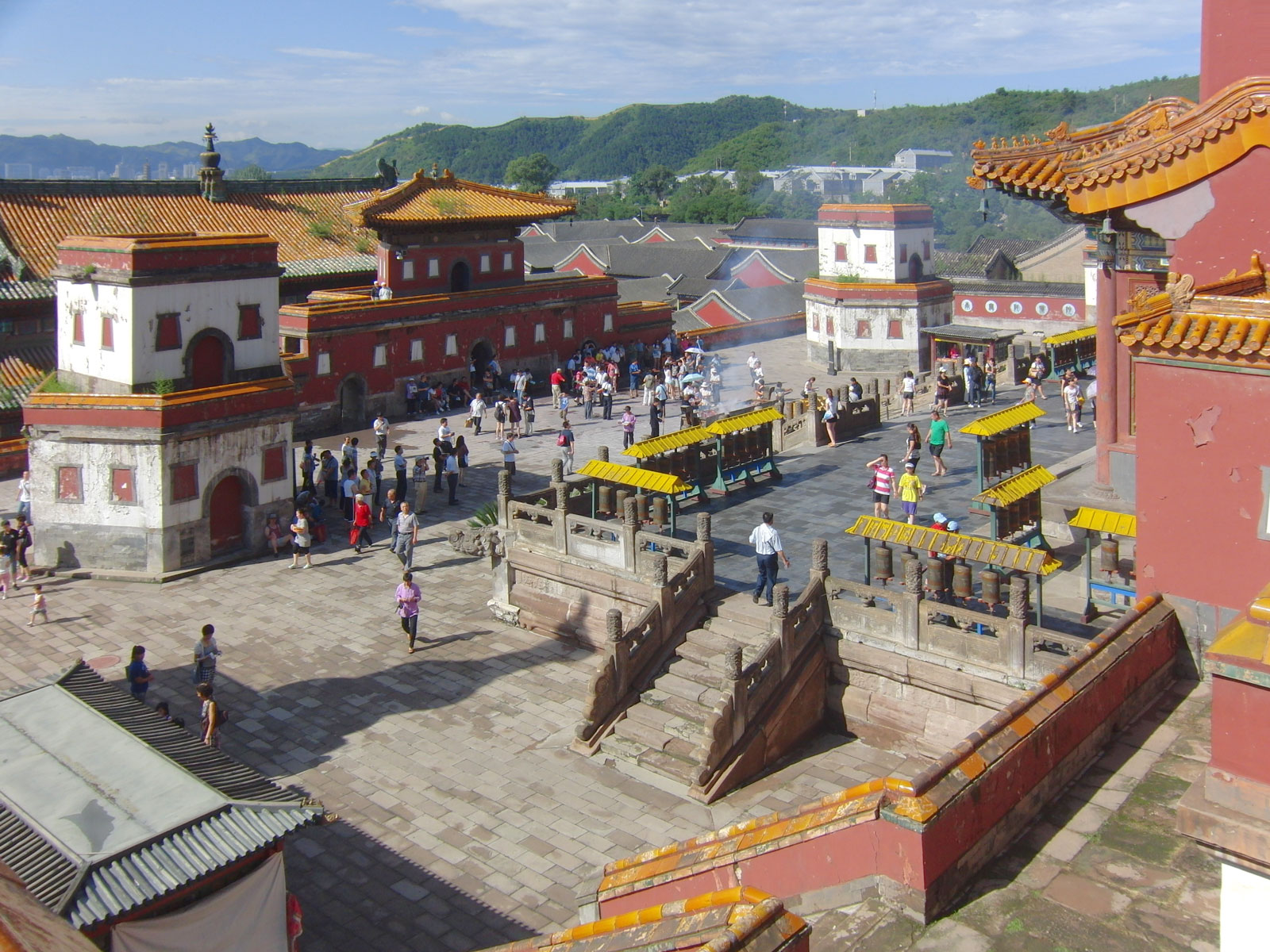
Area in front of the Bodhisattva hall

== See also ==
- List of Buddhist temples
- Putuo Zongcheng Temple
