= Huajiachi Botanical Garden =

Botanical garden in Hangzhou, China

- 華傢池植物園 (Chinese)
- Location within Eastern China Location within China
- Interactive map of Huajiachi Botanical Garden
- Type: Urban park
- Location: Huajiachi Campus, Zhejiang University
- Coordinates: 30°15′57″N 120°09′32″E
- Area: 0.93 hectares (2.3 acres)
- Created: 1927
- Status: Open all year

The Huajiachi Botanical Garden (simplified Chinese: 华家池植物园; traditional Chinese: 華傢池植物園), is a botanical garden of Zhejiang University.

== Introduction ==
It's the earliest modern botanical garden in China's history. It was first founded in August 1927 by Prof. Zhong Guanguang (钟观光), who was the pioneer of the modern China's botany. Mr. Zhong was also a Zhejiang native from Zhenhai, Ningbo.

The garden is located inside the Huajiachi Campus, Zhejiang University, and it's just aside the Hujiachi Lake.

The garden has an area of 0.93 hectare, and owns more than 1000 different kinds of plants. It's the second largest botanical garden of Zhejiang University, after the largest Yuquan Botanical Garden, which is located near the Yuquan Campus, Zhejiang University.
