= Peace Island (disambiguation) =

The Island of Peace is an Israeli-Jordanian park at the confluence of the Jordan River and Yarmouk River, on the border between Israel and Jordan

Peace Island may also refer to:

- Peace Island (Huajiachi), an island located in Huajiachi, Hangzhou, Zhejiang Province, People's Republic of China
- Hoa-pin San, the former name of Diaoyu Dao, or Uotsuri Jima.
