= Putuo Zongcheng Temple =

Buddhist temple complex in Chengde, China

Coordinates: 41.0125°N 117.928°E

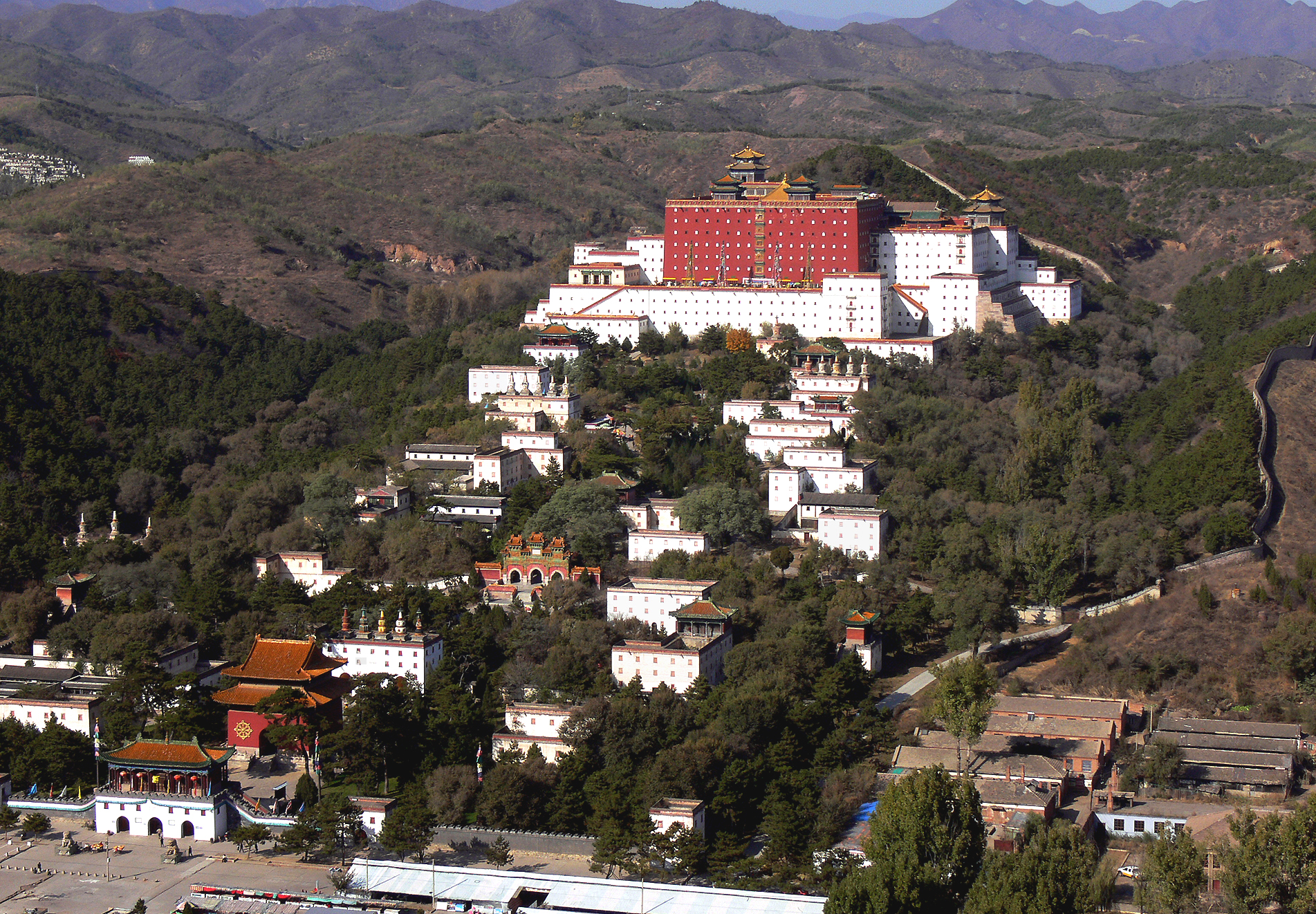
- The Putuo Zongcheng Temple of Chengde, built in the 18th century during the reign of the Qianlong Emperor.

Religion
- Affiliation: Buddhist
- Province: Hebei
- Region: China
- Status: Preserved

Location
- Municipality: Chengde
- Interactive map of Putuo Zongcheng Temple

Architecture
- Style: Tibetan and Chinese
- Completed: 1771; 255 years ago

Putuo Zongcheng Temple

Chinese name
- Simplified Chinese: 普陀宗乘之庙
- Traditional Chinese: 普陀宗乘之廟
Transcriptions
Standard Mandarin
- Hanyu Pinyin: Pǔtuó Zōngchéng zhī miào
- Wade–Giles: P'u-t'ou Tsung-ch'eng chih miao

Alternative Chinese name
- Chinese: 小布达拉宫
- Literal meaning: Little Potala Palace
Transcriptions

Tibetan name
- Tibetan: གྲུ་འཛིན་་་བསྟན་པའི་རྩ་བའི་ལྷ་ཁང༌།
Transcriptions
- Wylie: Chunzin Dainbaiza Pailhakang

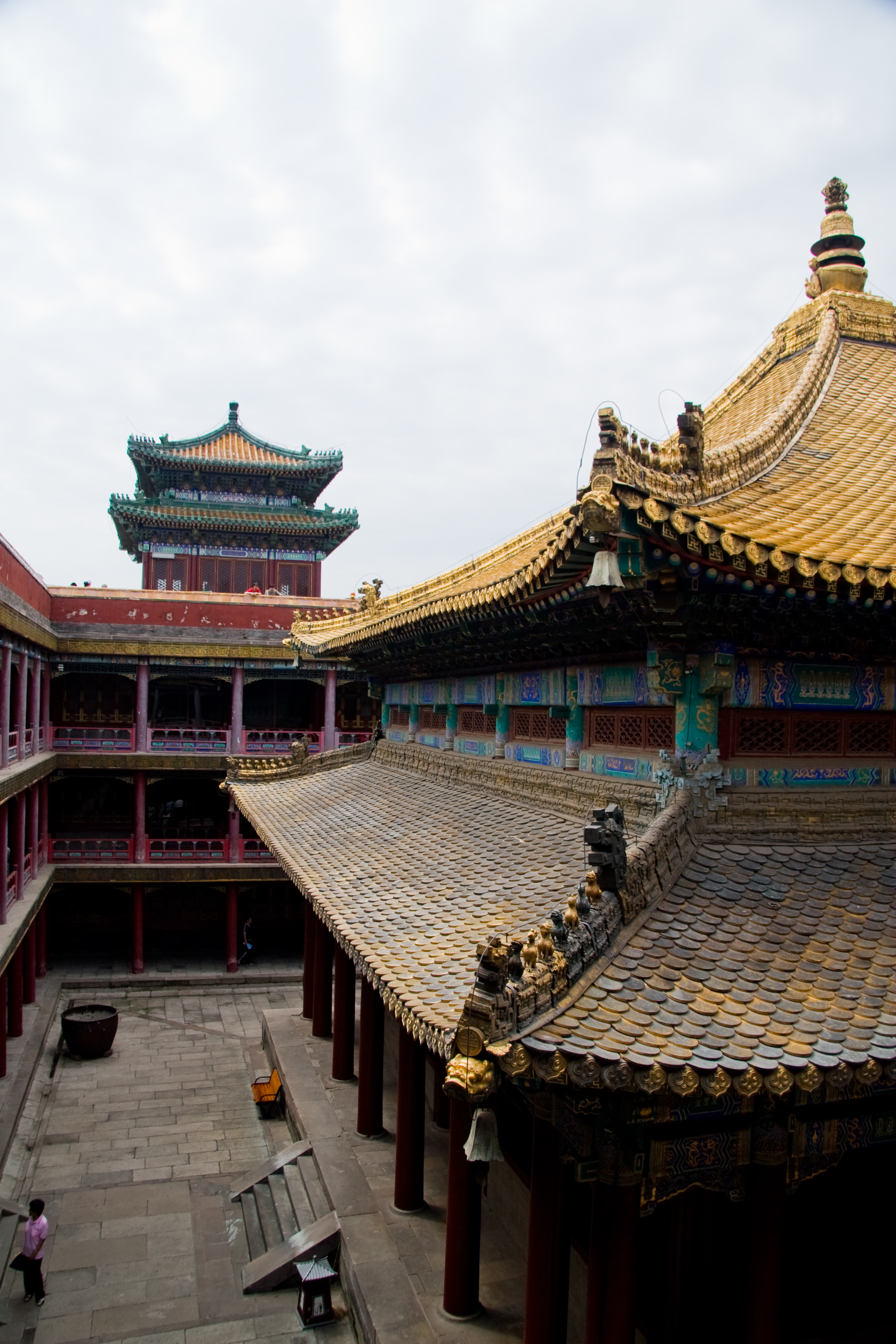
View within the Cihangpudu building, the main hall of the temple, crowned with Chinese pavilions and centered around a hall with a golden rooftop (see gallery picture below).

The Putuo Zongcheng Temple (Chinese: 普陀宗乘之庙; pinyin: Pǔtuó Zōngchéng zhī miào, Tibetan: གྲུ་འཛིན་་་བསྟན་པའི་རྩ་བའི་ལྷ་ཁང༌།, Wylie: Chunzin Dainbaiza Pailhakang) of Chengde, Hebei, China is a Buddhist temple complex built between 1767 and 1771. It is located near the Chengde Mountain Resort, which is south of the Putuo Zongcheng. Along with the equally famed Puning Temple, it is one of the Eight Outer Temples of Chengde. The temple was modeled after the Potala Palace of Tibet, the residence of the Dalai Lama built a century earlier. Since it was modeled after the Potala palace, the temple represents a fusion of Chinese and Tibetan architectural styles. The temple complex covers a surface area of some 220,000 square metres (2,400,000 ft^{2}), making it one of the largest in China. Many of its halls and pavilions are adorned with copper and gold tiled roofs, adding to the splendor of the site.

== History ==
The Putuo Zongcheng Temple is part of the "Eight Outer Temples" located in Chengde, which are part of the World Heritage List along with the Chengde Mountain Resort. These temples were administered by the Lifan Yuan, an administrative department for the affairs of ethnic minorities such as the Mongolians and the Tibetans, hence the different combinations of architectural style which could be seen throughout these Eight Outer Temples in Chengde.

The Putuo Zongcheng Temple was originally dedicated to Qianlong to celebrate his birthday, as well as provide Hebei with a Buddhist temple of equal size and splendor as the Potala Palace in Lhasa. The Putuo Zongcheng temple served more functions than just Buddhist ceremonies and festivals; it was also the location that the emperor would gather meetings of different ethnic envoys from within the empire. The location served as a peaceful getaway in contrast to the bustling life of the capital Beijing, as well as complimented the nearby hunting grounds that the emperor would enjoy with his guests.

As of 1994, the Chengde Mountain Resort and Chengde's Eight Outer Temples (including the Putuo Zongcheng Temple) were established as UNESCO World Heritage Sites. Today, the temple remains a site of tourism and local festivities.

== The replica of the Golden temple ==
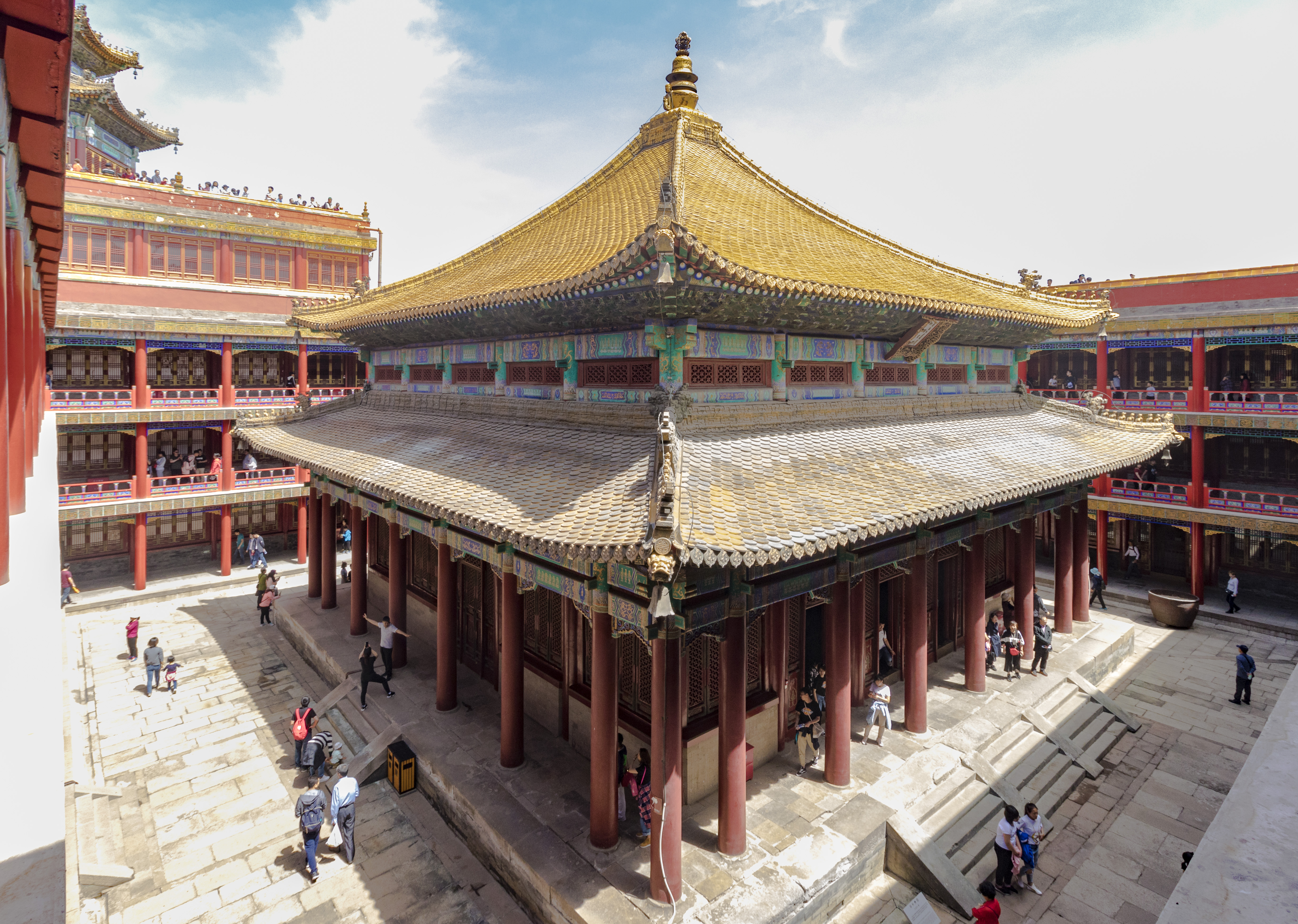
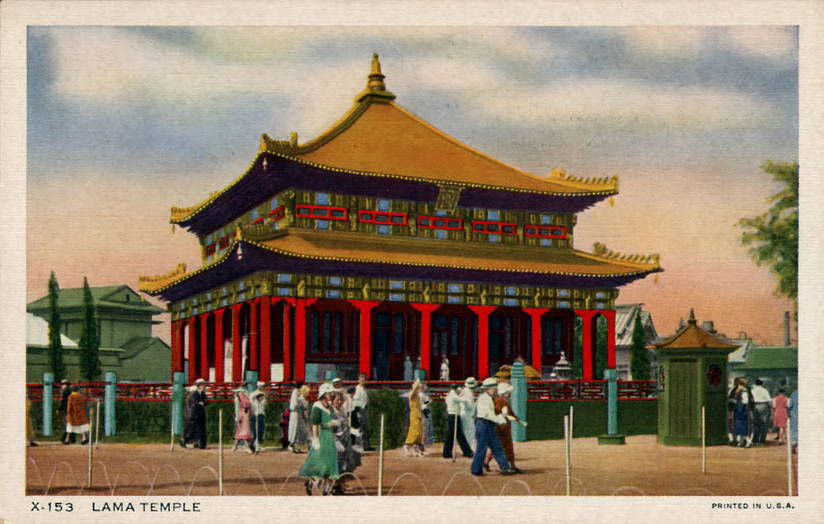
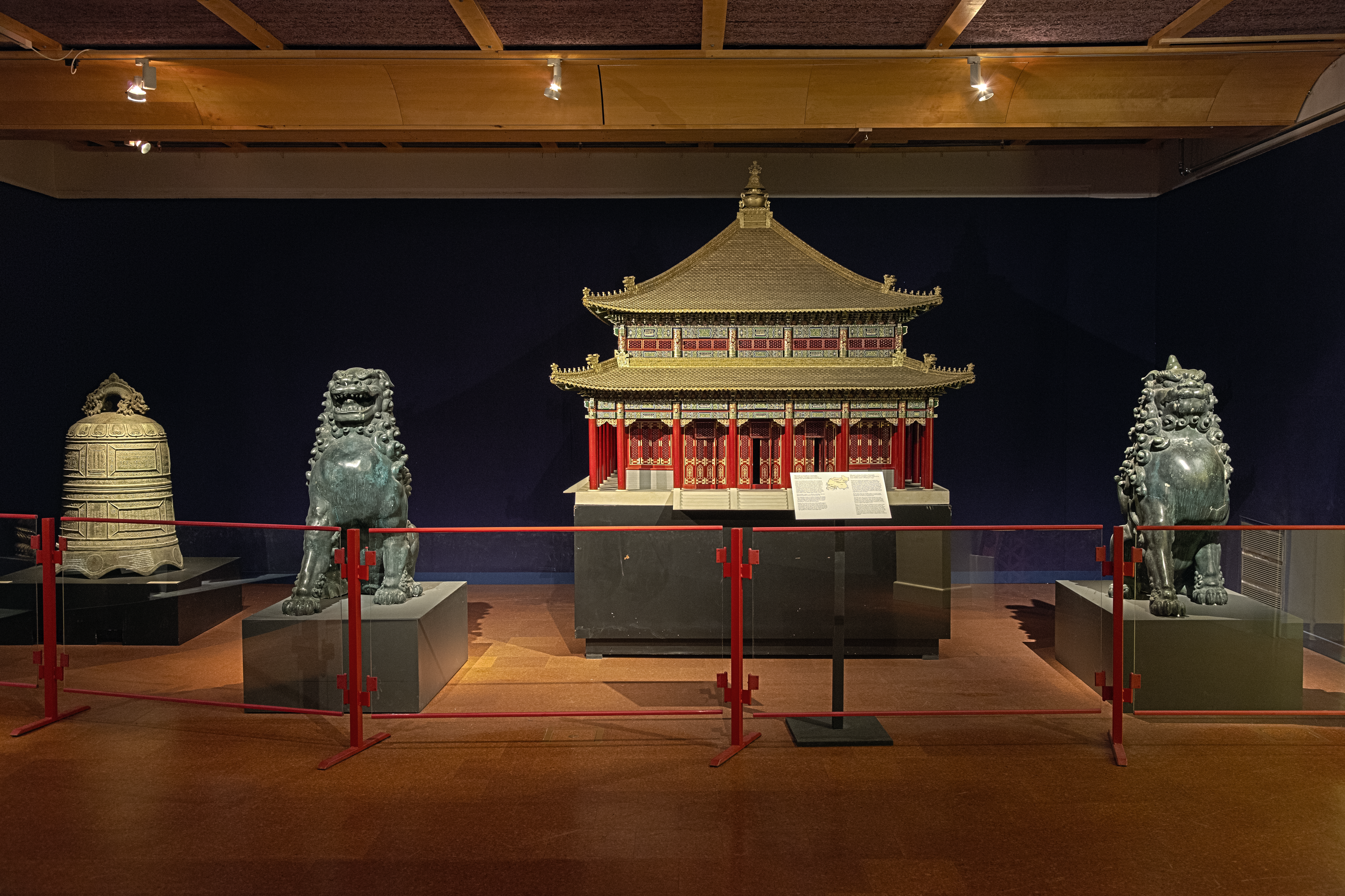
To the left the main hall Wanfaguiyi (picture from 2018). In the middle the replica in scale 1:1 in Chicago 1933. To the right the smaller replica in scale 1:10 at the Museum of Ethnography, Sweden.

Swedish explorers Sven Hedin, Gösta Montell, Georg Söderbom and Chinese architect Liang Weihua (W. H. Liang) came to Putuo Zongcheng in June 1930. This was part of the Sino-Swedish expedition and the mission was to procure a Lamaistic temple to the World Exhibition in Chicago in 1933, Century of Progress. An exact model in full scale 1:1 was manufactured at Liang's workshops in Beijing. Two smaller models in scale 1:10 were also made. The full scale model was set up in Chicago. One of the smaller models was also sent to Chicago to help set up the full scale temple. The other small model was taken to the Museum of Ethnography in Stockholm.

== Gates, halls, and towers ==
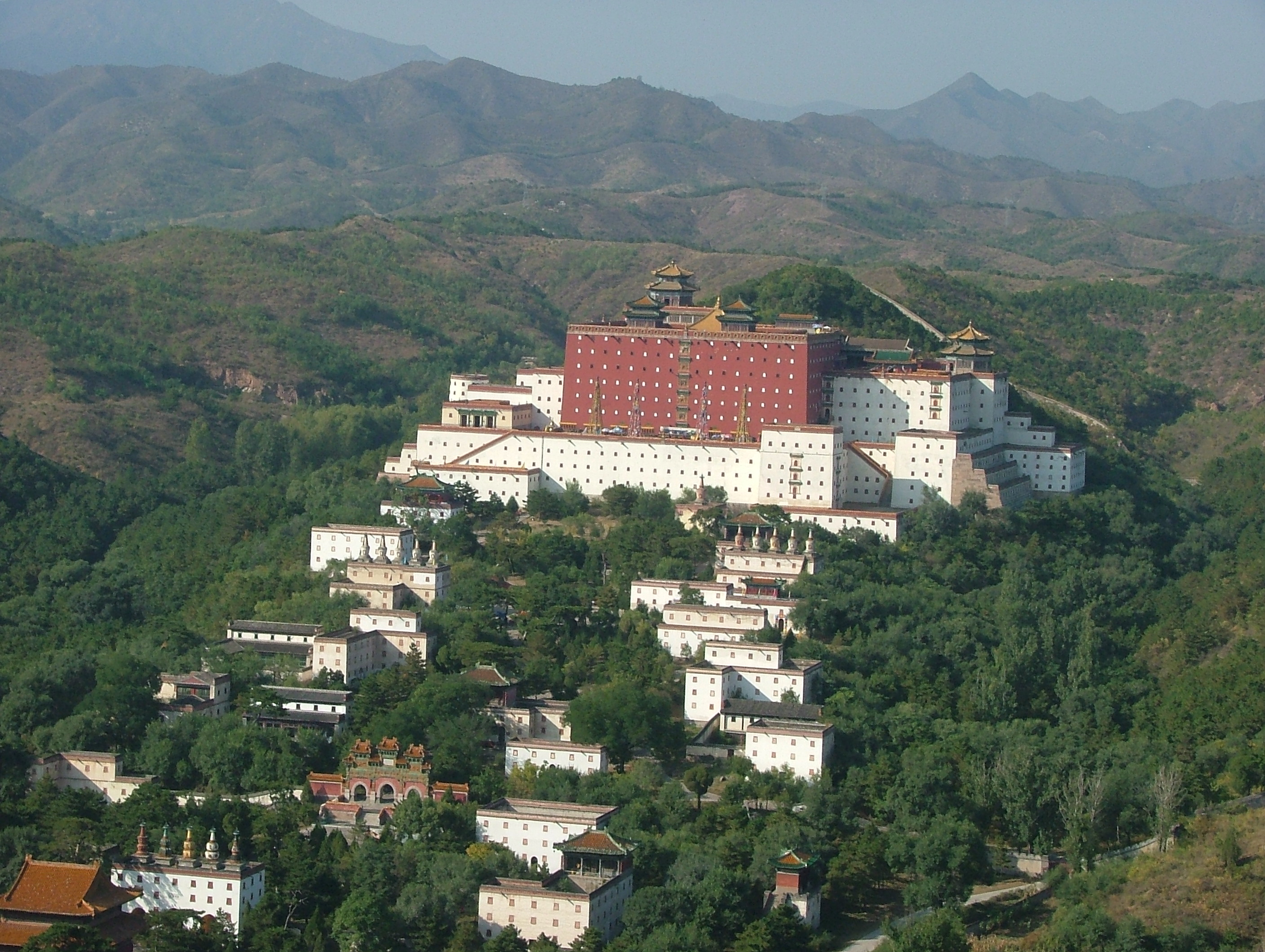
Another aerial view

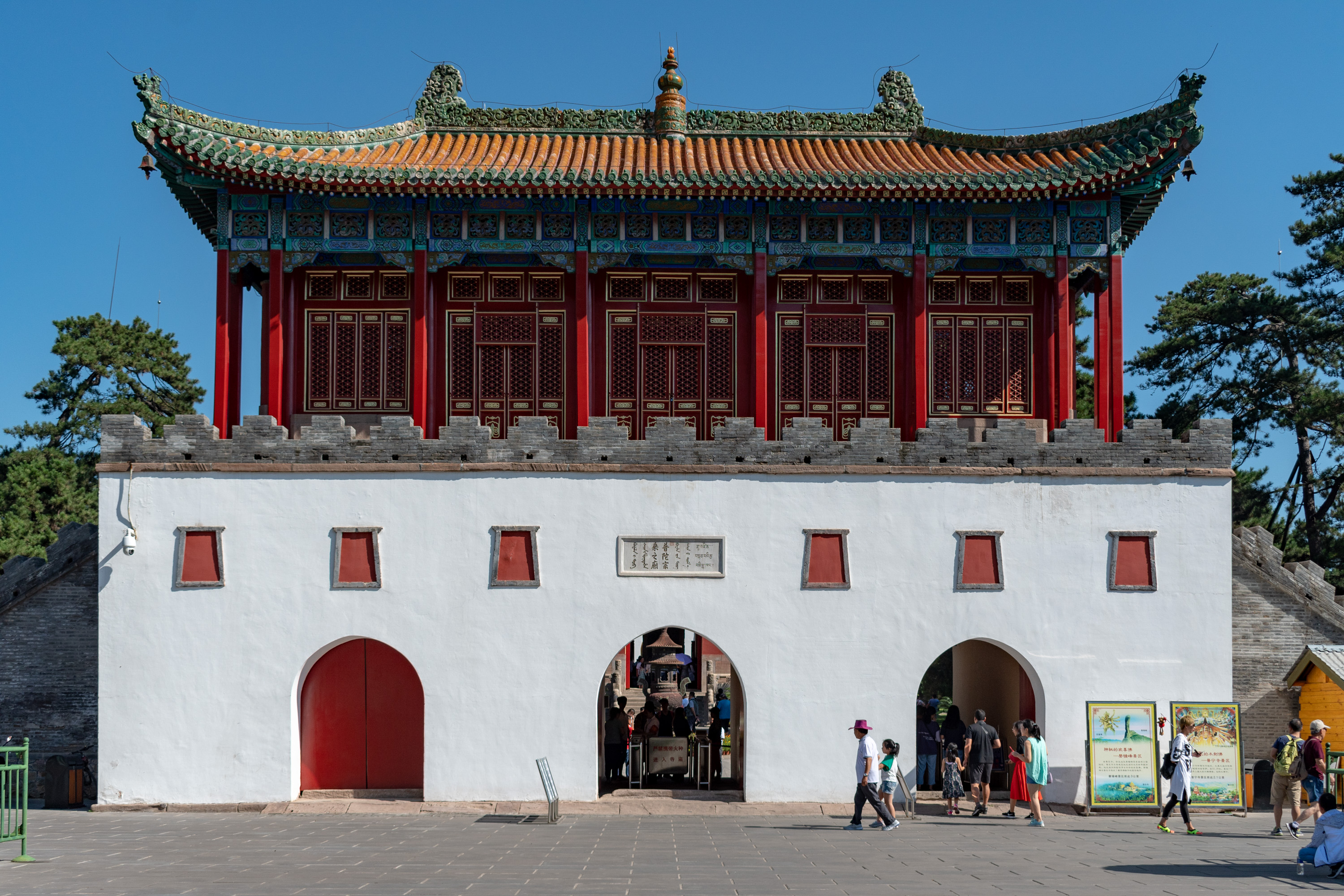
Entrance to the complex

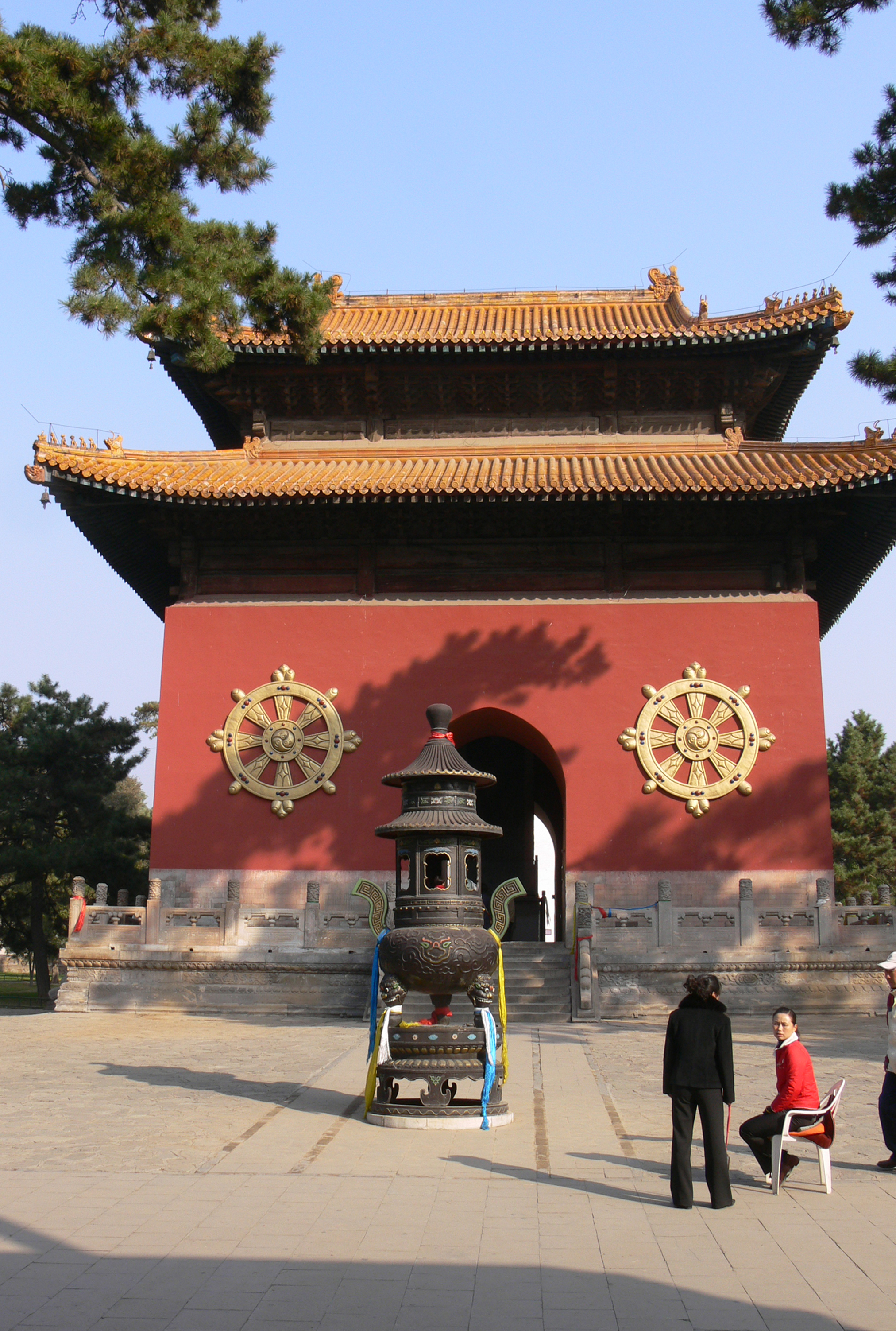
The Qianlong Tablet Pavilion, located behind the front entrance

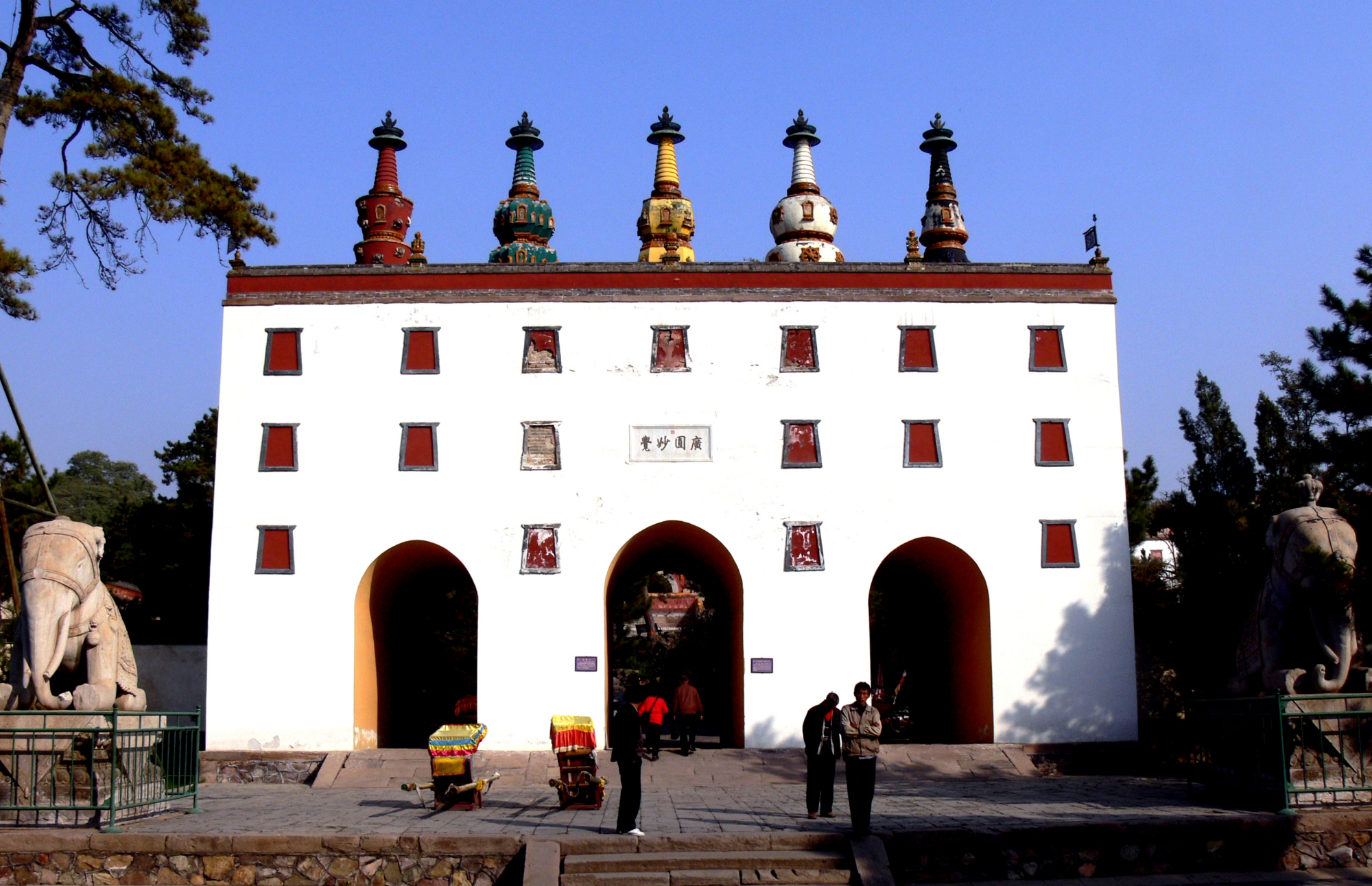
The Five Pagodas Gate, located behind the Qianlong Tablet Pavilion,

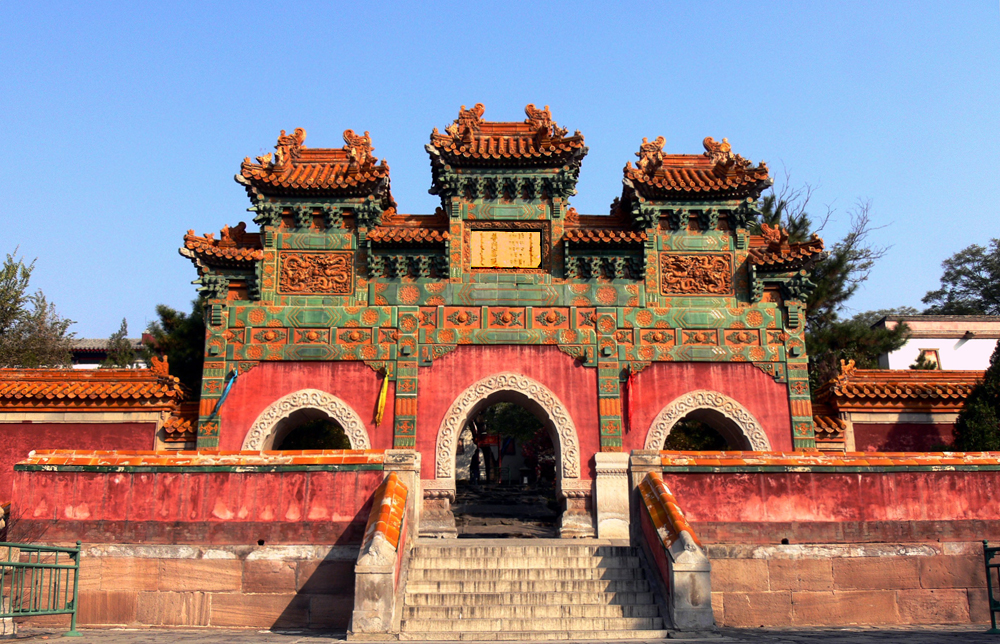
Gateway with multi-colored tiles, located behind the Five Pagodas Gate

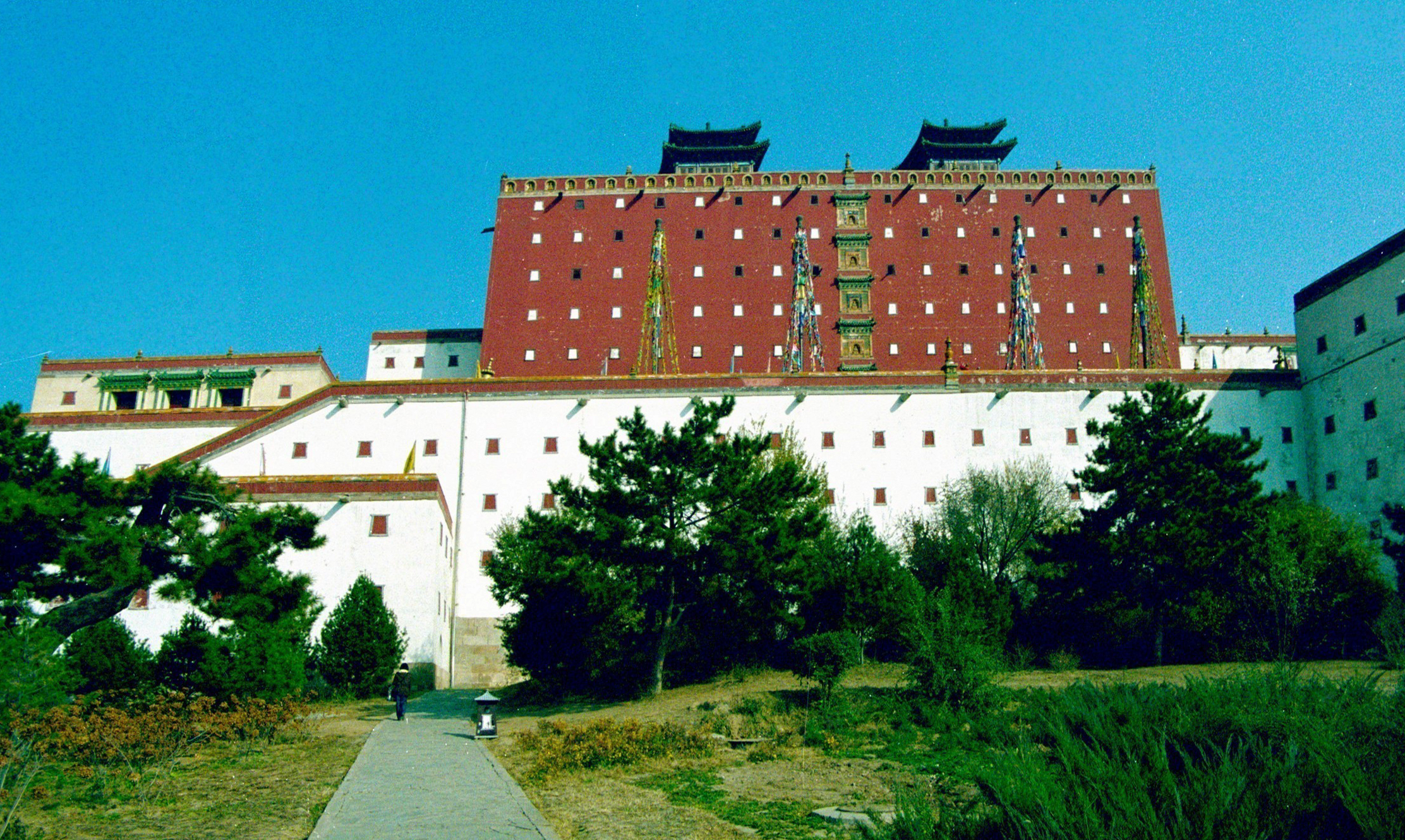
Main hall of the temple, surrounding the Wanfaguiyi Hall at its center.

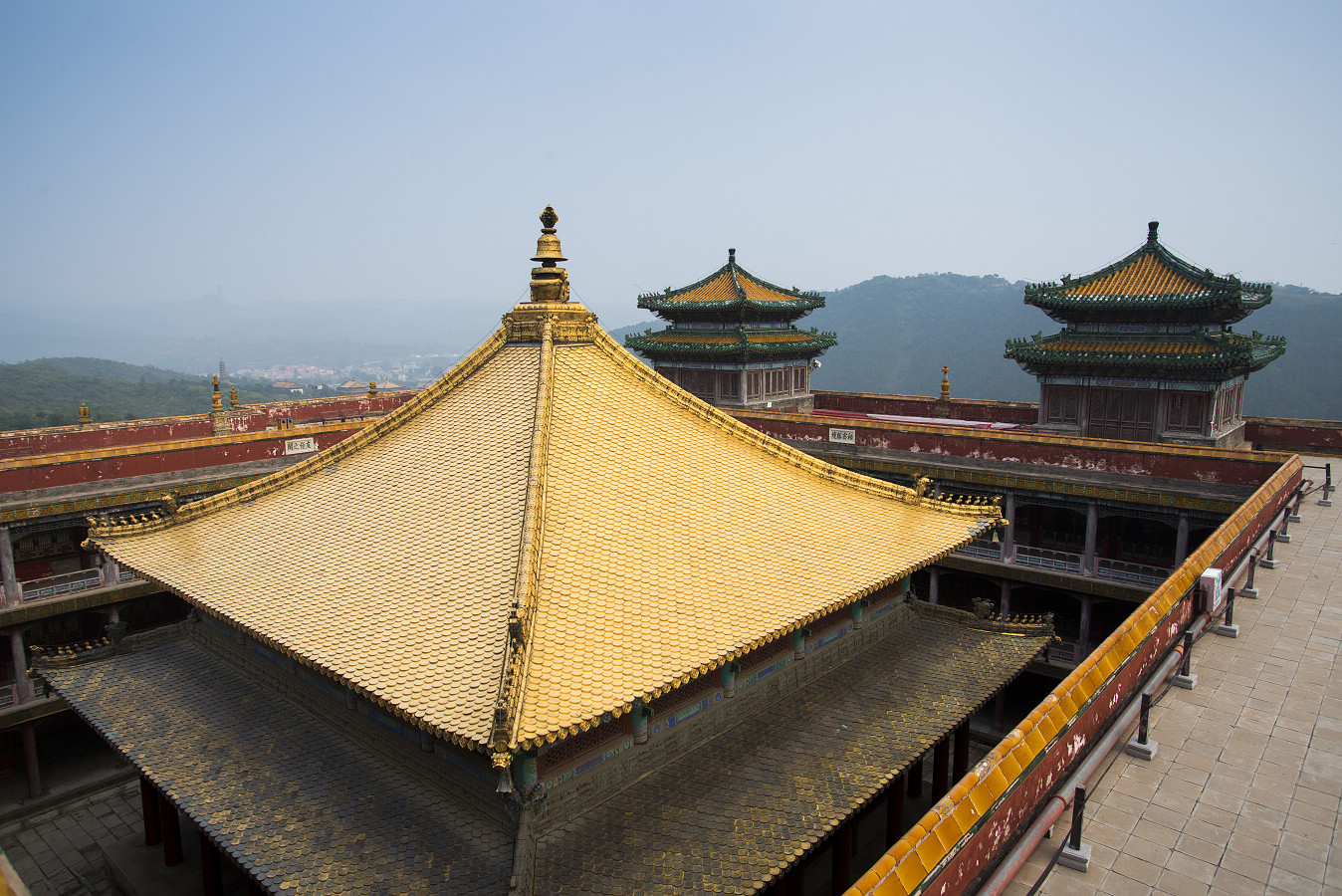
The golden rooftop of Wanfaguiyi Hall

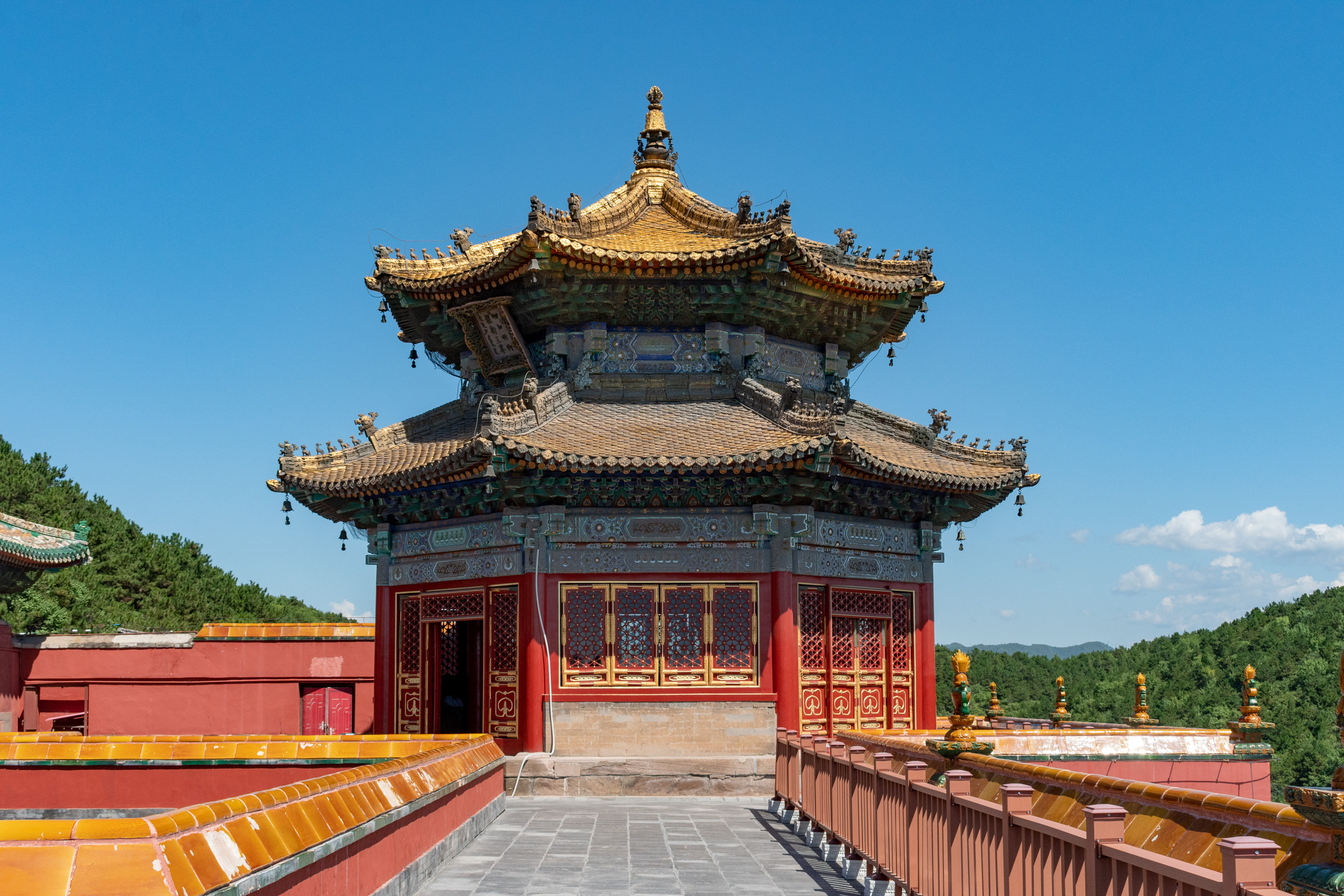
Corner pavilion of Wanfaguiyi

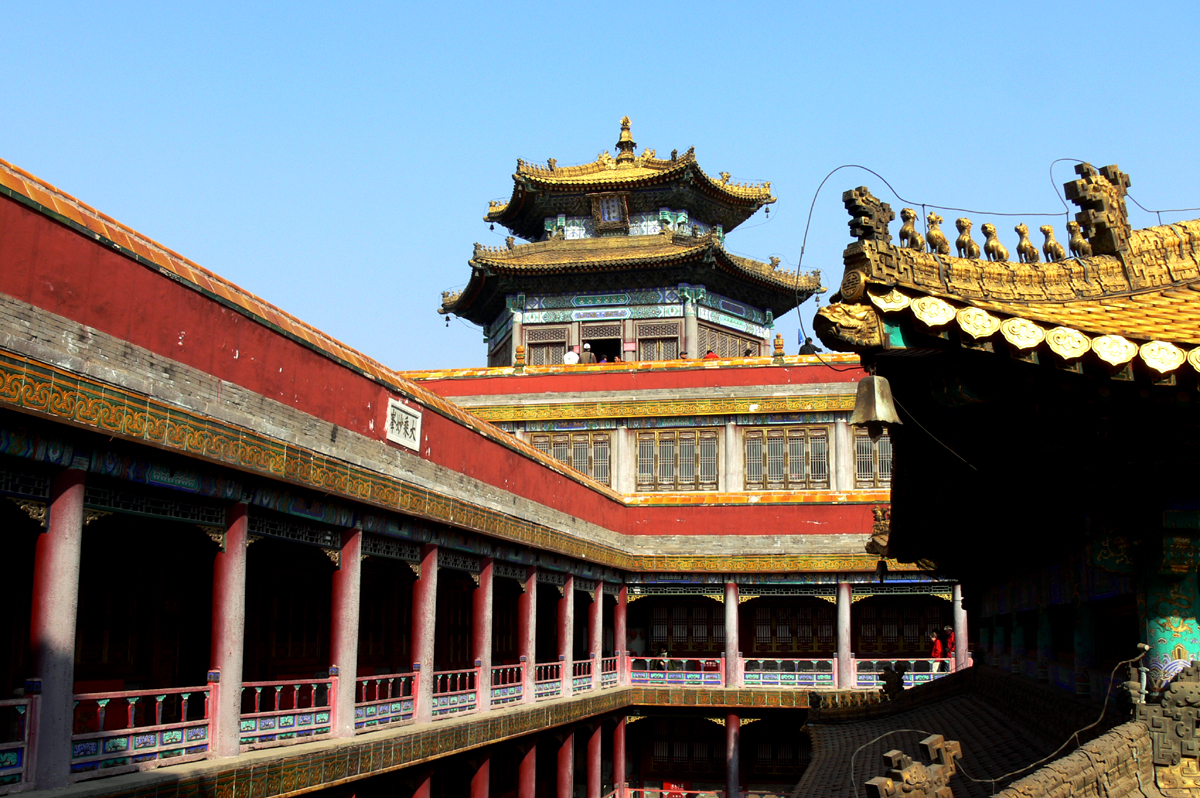
Cihangpudu with the Wanfaguiyi Hall

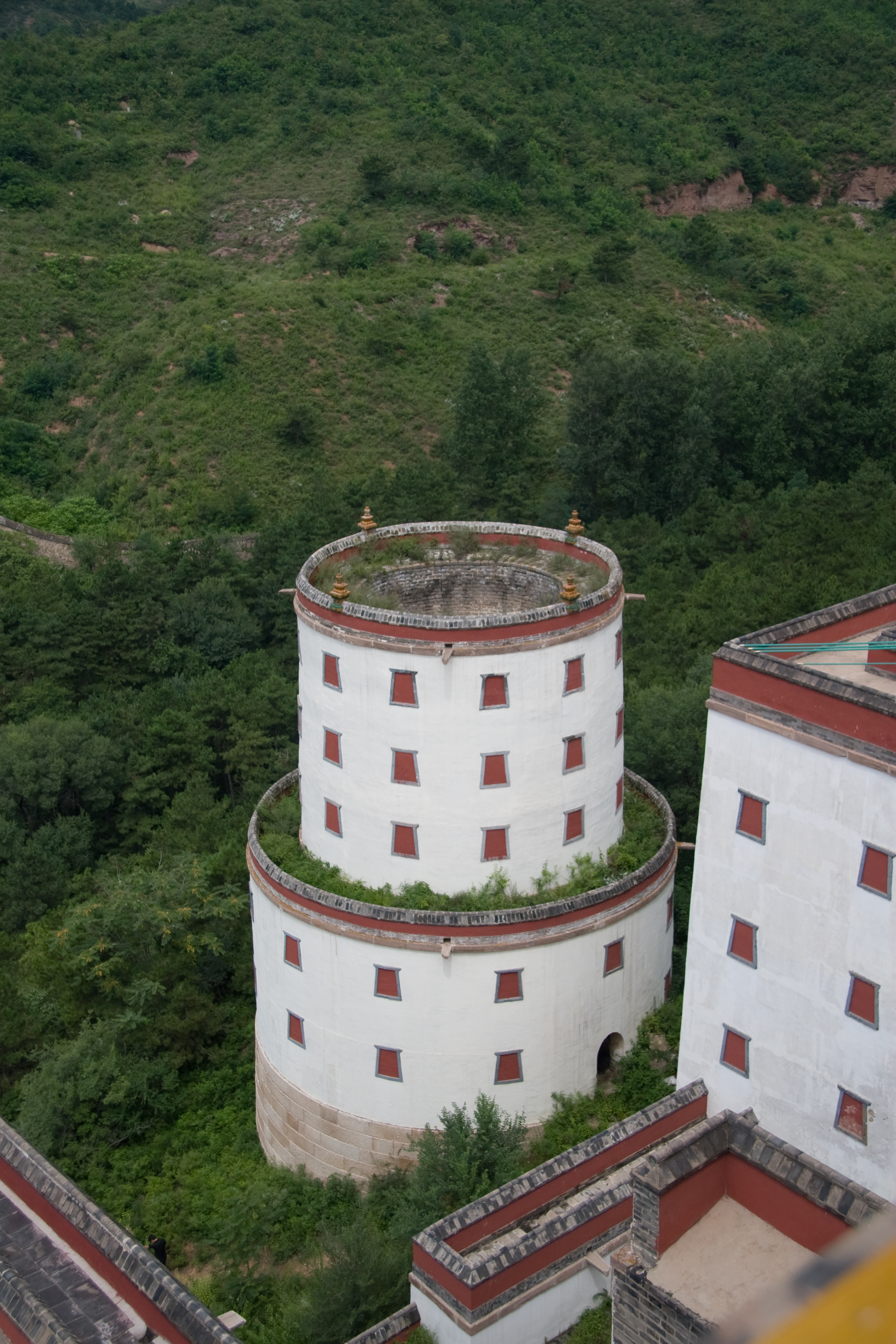
Doubled-layered, cylindrical tower.

== See also ==
- List of Buddhist temples
- Puning Temple
- Xumi Fushou Temple
