= Huajiachi =

- Location within Zhejiang
- Location: Jianggan District, Hangzhou, Zhejiang
- Coordinates: 30°16′22″N 120°11′24″E
- Type: lake

Huajiachi (simplified Chinese: 华家池; traditional Chinese: 華家池) is a lake in Hangzhou, Zhejiang.

== Introduction ==
The lake is located in the Huajiachi Campus, Zhejiang University. It is the second largest lake in Hangzhou after the West Lake. Along the lake there is a Chinese pavilion named Huxin Ting (湖心亭). The lake has a water surface of more than 90 mu (over 55,000 m^{2}) and an average depth of 2 meters.

Hua (traditional Chinese: 華; simplified Chinese: 华) is a common Chinese surname, and jia (家) means family in Chinese; so Huajia implies that this place probably belonged to the Hua Family in the ancient time. Chi (池) stands for lake. And the Zhejiang University campus is just named after this lake.

About six-hundred years ago, it was wasteland nearby, and a highly ranked official Mr. Hua during Ming Dynasty Hongwu Era (1368-1398) once passed-by and first settled down there, opened the wasteland.
