= Chinese pavilion =

Traditional Chinese garden pavilion

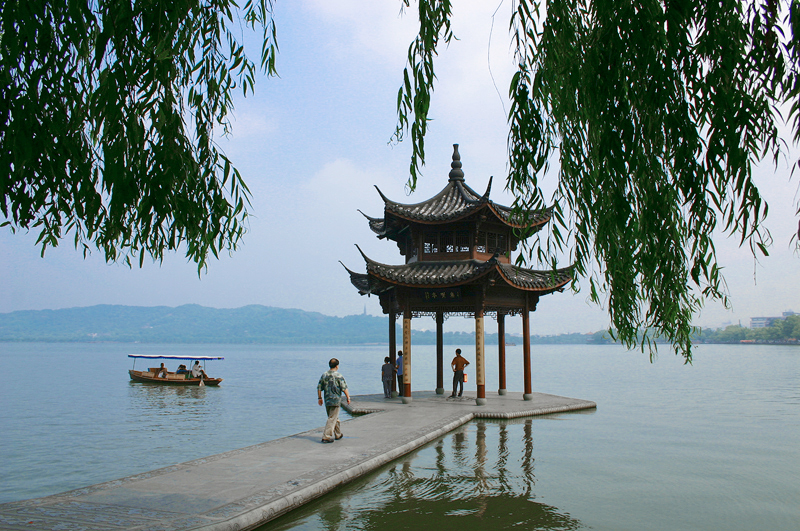
The Jixian Pavilion on the West Lake in Hangzhou

A Chinese pavilion (Chinese 亭, pinyin tíng) is a garden pavilion in traditional Chinese architecture. While often found within temples, pavilions are not exclusively religious structures. Many Chinese parks and gardens feature pavilions to provide shade and a place to rest.

== History ==
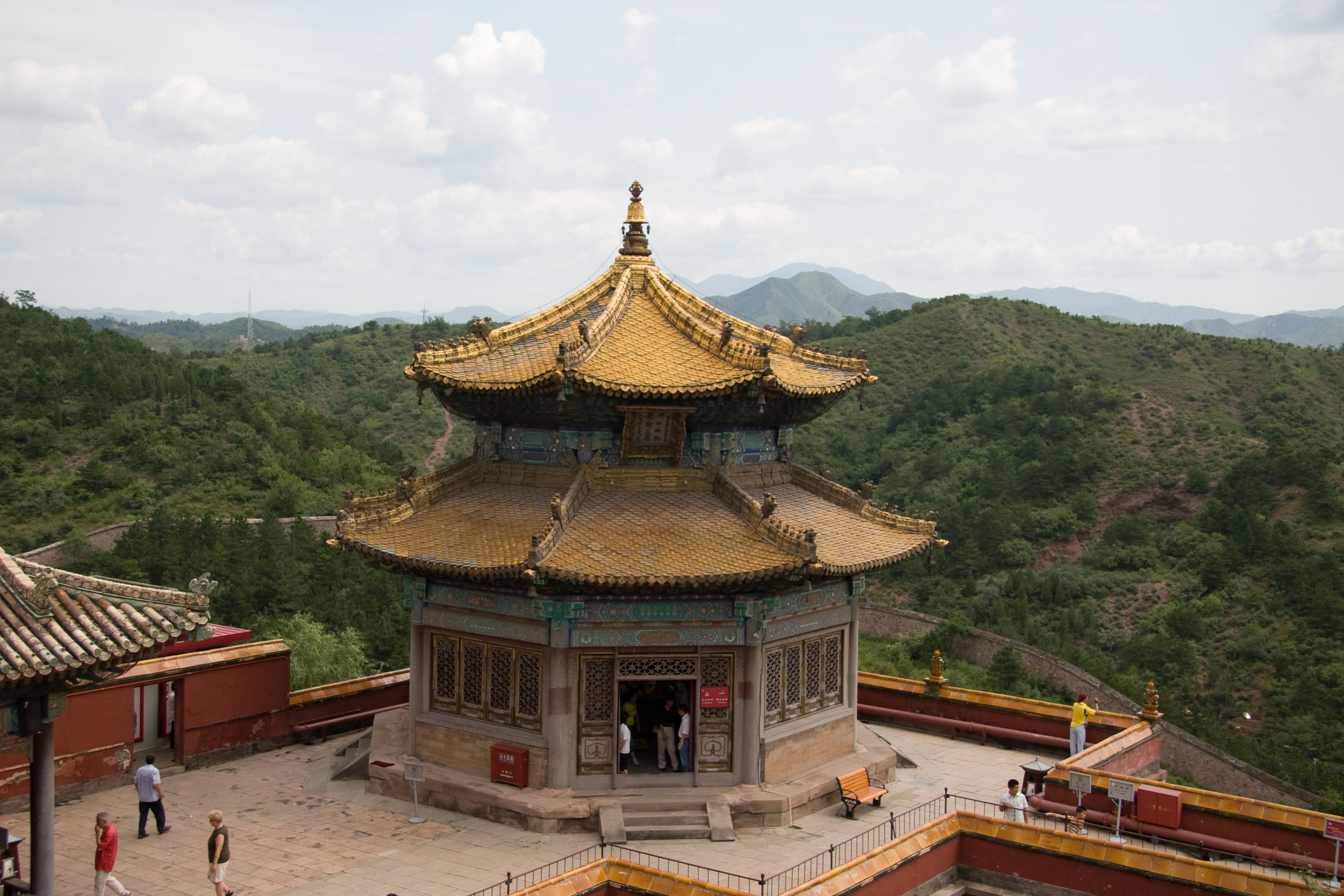
A golden-tiled roof pavilion atop the main hall of the Putuo Zongcheng Temple near Chengde, built from 1767–1771 during the reign of the Qianlong Emperor.

Pavilions are known to have been built as early as the Zhou dynasty (1046–256 BCE), although no examples of that period remain today. The first use of the Chinese character for pavilion dates to the Spring and Autumn period (722–481 BCE) and the Warring States period (403–221 BCE). During the Han dynasty (202 BCE–220 CE) they were used as watchtowers and local government buildings. These multi-story constructions had at least one floor without surrounding walls to allow observation of the surroundings.

During the Sui (581–618) and Tang (618–907) dynasties wealthy officials and scholars incorporated pavilions into their personal gardens. During this period the function of pavilions shifted from the practical to the aesthetic. Pavilions provided a place to sit and enjoy the scenery, and they also became a part of the scenery itself, being attractive structures. Brush-and-ink landscape scrolls of the Song dynasty (960–1279) show the isolated pavilions of scholar hermits in mountainous regions. Under the impetus of scholarly tastes for the simplicity of a rustic life, while previously pavilions were constructed from stone, other materials such as bamboo, grass and wood came into use.

== Types ==
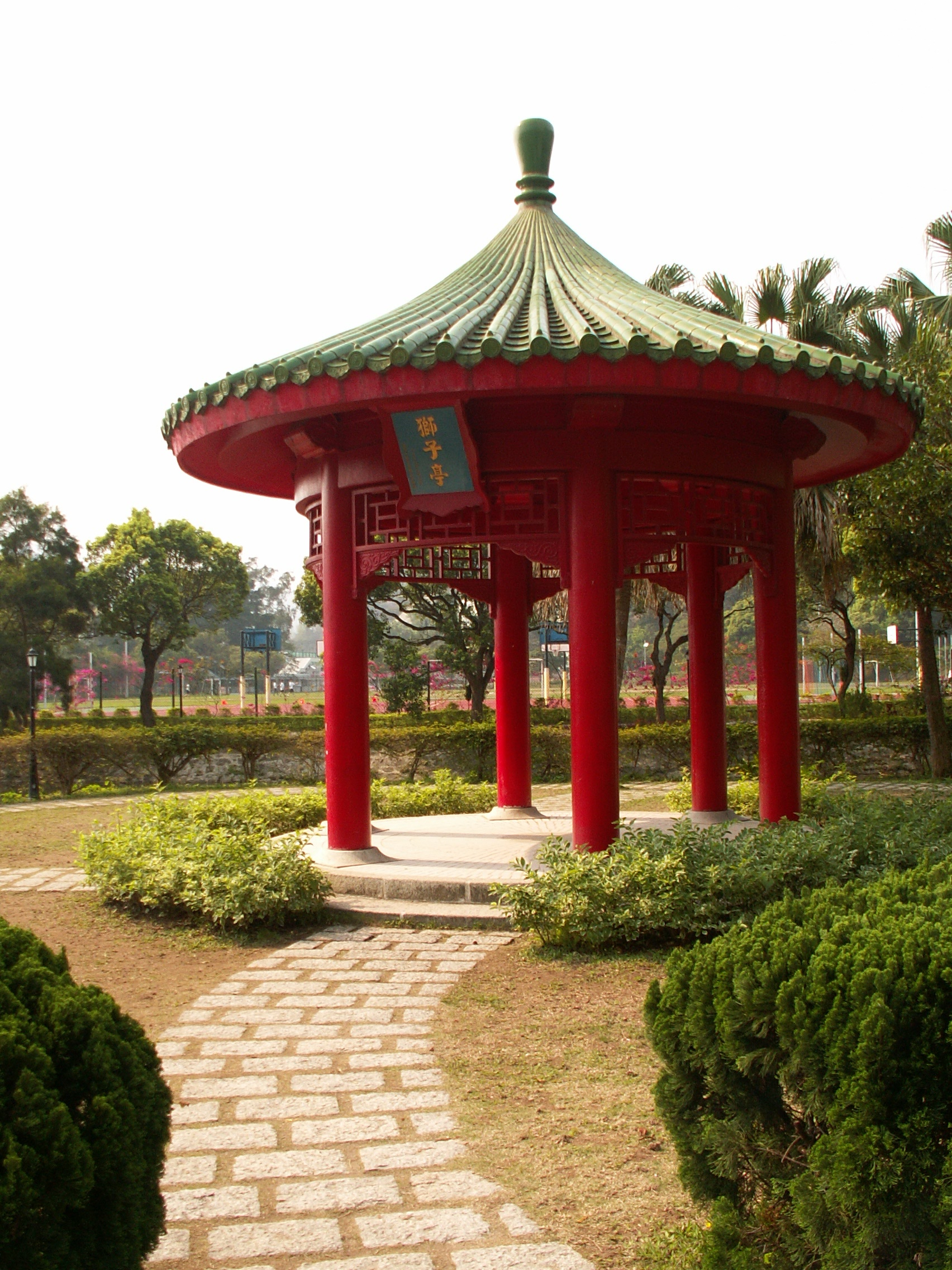
A round pavilion in CUHK, Hong Kong

Pavilions are often classified according to their shape when viewed from above. Round, square, hexagonal and octagonal pavilions are common, while more unusual designs also exist such as the Nanhai Pavilion located at the Temple of Heaven in Beijing, which consists of two round pavilions joined.

== Origin of the name ==
While the name is commonly believed to be related to its purpose as a place to stay and rest (Chinese: 停留休息; pinyin: tínglíuxīuxi), the fact that the earliest pavilions were used for military and governmental purposes casts doubt on this interpretation.

== See also ==
- Pavilion
- Gazebo
- China pavilion at Expo 2010
