= Huajiachi Campus, Zhejiang University =

Campus of Zhejiang University, China

- 浙江大学华家池校区
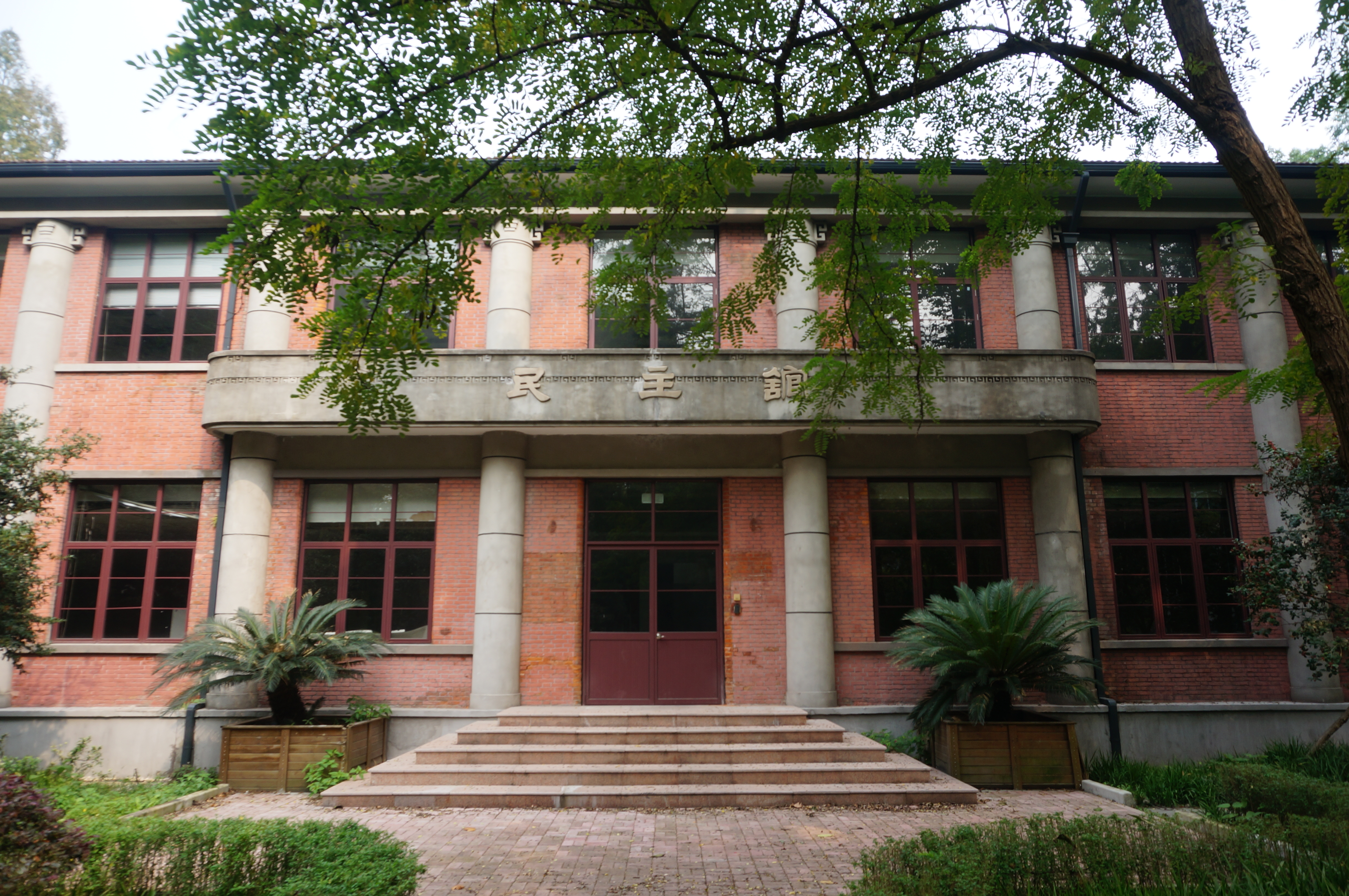
- The Democratic Building in 2017
- Former names: Zhejiang Agricultural University; National Chekiang University
- Established: 1934; 92 years ago
- Parent institution: Zhejiang University
- Location: 268 Kaixuan Road, Hangzhou, Zhejiang, 310029, China; 30.27292°N 120.19164°E
- Campus: 98.93 hectares (244.5 acres)

Huajiachi Campus (Traditional Chinese: 浙江大學華傢池校區, Simplified Chinese: 浙江大学华家池校区) is a major urban campus of Zhejiang University.

== Introduction ==
Before 1998, it was the campus of Zhejiang Agricultural University (ZAU). In 1998, the university was merged into Zhejiang University. In fact, before 1953, the ZAU was an agriculture school of Zhejiang University, so it was a kind of rejoining, the same as the previous Hangzhou University, Zhejiang Medical University.

The campus encompasses a total surface of 1484 mu, with a construction area of 0.3 million m^{2}. It includes a botanical garden, which is the first one in modern Chinese history.

== Institutions ==
- School of Continuing Education
- School of Medicine (research)
