= Xu Ningsheng =

Chinese physicist (born 1957)

- 许宁生

President of Fudan University
- In office 24 October 2014 – 7 November 2021
- Preceded by: Yang Yuliang
- Succeeded by: Jin Li

President of Sun Yat-sen University
- In office 23 December 2010 – 24 October 2014
- Preceded by: Huang Daren
- Succeeded by: Luo Jun

Personal details
- Born: July 7, 1957 (age 69) Puning, Guangdong, China
- Party: Chinese Communist Party
- Education: Sun Yat-sen University; Aston University

Xu Ningsheng (许宁生; born 7 July 1957) is a Chinese physicist and academic administrator. He previously served as president of Fudan University from 2014 to 2021, president of Sun Yat-sen University from 2010 to 2014, vice president of Sun Yat-sen University from 2004 to 2010, and dean of the Sun Yat-sen University School of Physical Science and Engineering Technology from 1999 to 2004.

He is an academician of the Chinese Academy of Sciences and The World Academy of Sciences.

== Biography ==
Xu was born in Zhanlong Town of Puning, Guangdong province, on July 7, 1957, with his ancestral home in Chenghai District, Shantou. Xu secondary studied at Xingwen High School.

He was a sent-down youth from 1975 to 1978, during the Cultural Revolution.

After the Resumption of University Entrance Examination in 1977, he studied, then taught, at the Department of Physics of Sun Yat-sen University, in Guangzhou. He received his doctor's degree from Aston University in 1986, and taught at the university for 10 years afterwards.

He was honored as a Distinguished Young Scholar by the National Science Fund for Distinguished Young Scholars (国家杰出青年科学基金) in 1995.

In 1996 and that year, he returned to China and became professor of physics at Sun Yat-sen University, becoming Dean of its School of Physics and Engineering in 1999, and was promoted to vice-president in 2004. He also served as Dean of International Exchange College between 2004 and 2008.

He was elected a fellow of the Institute of Physics in 1998. He was named a Chang Jiang Scholar by the Ministry of Education of China in 1999.

In December 2010, he was appointed President of Sun Yat-sen University. In October 2014 he was appointed President of Fudan University.

Educational offices
Preceded by Huang Daren	President of Sun Yat-sen University; 2010–2014	Succeeded by Luo Jun (罗俊)
Preceded by Yang Yuliang	President of Fudan University; 2014–2021	Succeeded by Jin Li
