= Yang Yuliang =

Chinese chemist and educator

- 杨玉良

President of Fudan University
- In office 14 January 2009 – 24 October 2014
- Preceded by: Wang Shenghong
- Succeeded by: Xu Ningsheng

Personal details
- Born: November 1952 (age 73) Haiyan County, Zhejiang, China
- Party: Chinese Communist Party
- Education: Fudan University

Yang Yuliang (simplified Chinese: 杨玉良; traditional Chinese: 楊玉良; pinyin: Yáng Yùliáng; born November 1952) is a Chinese chemist and educator. He is a member of Chinese Academy of Sciences. He formerly served as president of Fudan University between January 14, 2009 to October 24, 2014.

== Biography ==
Yang was born and raised in Haiyan County, Zhejiang. After high school, he studied, then taught, at Fudan University. In 1986, he was a postdoctoral researcher under the direction of Spiess, at Max Planck Institute for Polymer Research.

Yang returned to China in 1988 and that year taught at Fudan University, he was promoted to professor in 1993, becoming its vice-President in 1999.

He was appointed as a Chang Jiang Scholar by the Ministry of Education of the People's Republic of China in 1999.

He was elected a fellow of the Chinese Academy of Sciences in 2003.

On January 14, 2009, he was appointed president of Fudan University, serving until October 24, 2014.

Now he is the Dean of the Chinese Ancient Books Protection Research School of Fudan University.

Educational offices
Preceded by Wang Shenghong (王生洪)	President of Fudan University; 2009–2014	Succeeded by Xu Ningsheng
