= George Chann =

Chinese-American painter

George Chann (1913–1995) was a Chinese American painter.

Chann was born in Guangzhou, China, on January 1, 1913. He lived with his father in Stockton, California during his youth. He returned to Guangzhou to attended Sun Yat-sen University. In 1932, he returned to the United States. He graduated from the Otis Art Institute in 1945. After his graduation, he began teaching there in addition to exhibiting.

Before the 1950s, Chann's works were mostly portrait paintings, with some still life and landscape paintings. In the 1950s, his works became more abstract and increasingly incorporated Chinese artifacts; for example, he rubbed some paintings with oracle bones. His art increased in popularity after his death on May 26, 1995.
