= List of presidents of Fudan University =

The president of Fudan University is the chief executive officer of Fudan University, and, essentially, the leader of the university. Each is appointed by and is responsible to the Central Committee of the Chinese Communist Party and the State Council, who delegate to him or her the day-to-day running of the university.

Fudan University, was set up in 1905, and its first president, was Ma Xiangbo, a Chinese Jesuit priest, scholar and educator, he also founded the Aurora University.

The university's current president is Jin Li, who is also a fellow of the Chinese Academy of Sciences.

== Presidents of Fudan University ==
Period	Year	President (English name)	President (Chinese name)	Alma mater	Ref
Fudan Public College	1905–1906	Ma Xiangbo	马相伯	Xuhui High School	
Fudan Public College	1906–1907	Yan Fu	严复	Royal Naval College, Greenwich	
Fudan Public College	1907–1909	Xia Jingguan	夏敬观	Liangjiang Normal College	
Fudan Public College	1909–1910	Gao Fengqian	高凤谦		
Fudan Public College	1910–1912	Ma Xiangbo	马相伯		
Fudan Public College	1913–1917	Li Denghui	李登辉	Ohio Wesleyan University; Yale University	
Private Fudan University	1917–July 1936	Li Denghui	李登辉	Ohio Wesleyan University; Yale University	
Private Fudan University	1918	Tang Luyuan	唐路园		
Private Fudan University	July 1924–March 1925	Zing-Yang Kuo	郭任远	Fudan University; University of California, Berkeley	
Private Fudan University	August 1936–May 1940	Qian Xinzhi	钱新之	Kobe University	
National Fudan University	May 1940–February 1943	Nan-hsuan M. Woo	吴南轩	University of California	
National Fudan University	February 1943–July 1949	Zhang Yi	章益	Saint John's University, Shanghai	
National Fudan University	July 1949–September 1952	Zhang Zhirang	张志让	Columbia University; Humboldt University of Berlin	
Fudan University	September 1952–December 1966; October 1972–October 1977	Chen Wangdao	陈望道	Toyo University; Waseda University; Chuo University	
Fudan University	July 1978–January 1983	Su Buqing	苏步青	Tohoku University	
Fudan University	January 1983–November 1988	Xie Xide	谢希德	Xiamen University; Smith College; Massachusetts Institute of Technology	
Fudan University	November 1988–November 1993	Hua Zhongyi	华中一	Jiao Tong University	
Fudan University	November 1993–December 1998	Yang Fujia	杨福家	Fudan University	
Fudan University	December 1998–January 2009	Wang Shenghong	王生洪	Shanghai University of Science and Technology	
Fudan University	January 2009–October 2014	Yang Yuliang	杨玉良	Fudan University	
Fudan University	October 2014–November 2021	Xu Ningsheng	许宁生	Sun Yat-sen University; Aston University	
Fudan University	November 2021–present	Jin Li	金力	Fudan University; University of Texas Health Science Center at Houston	

== Chinese Communist Party secretaries of Fudan University ==
Period	Year	Communist Party Secretary (English name)	Communist Party Secretary (Chinese name)	Alma mater	Ref
Fudan University	January 1952–1954	Li Zhengwen	李正文	Northeastern University (China); Tsinghua University	
Fudan University	1954–1965	Yang Xiguang	杨西光		
Fudan University	October 1965–1978	Wang Ling	王零		
Fudan University	1978–1979	Xia Zhengnong	夏征农	University of Nanking; Fudan University	
Fudan University	1979–1984	Sheng Hua	盛华	Kaifeng University; Peking University; Tohoku University	
Fudan University	1984–August 1990	Lin Ke	林克		
Fudan University	August 1990–1995	Qian Dongsheng	钱冬生	Dalian University of Technology	
Fudan University	1995–January 1999	Cheng Tianquan	程天权	Fudan University	
Fudan University	January 1999–September 2011	Qin Shaode	秦绍德	Fudan University	
Fudan University	September 2011–October 2016	Zhu Zhiwen	朱之文	Xiamen University	
Fudan University	October 2016–present	Jiao Yang	焦扬	Nanyang Technological University	
