= Susana Wong Soi Man =

黃穗文 Wong Soi Man

Director of the Marine and Water Bureau of the Macau Government
- Incumbent
- Assumed office 15 July, 2013

Personal details
- Born: 1967 (age 58–59) China, Guangdong, Guangzhou
- Citizenship: People's Republic of China (Macau)
- Education: Electronics degree from Sun Yat-sen University; Master's degree in public administration from the University of Macau in collaboration with the National Institute of Administration of Portugal; Master's degree in Maritime Safety Administration from the World Maritime University
- Profession: Principal of the Macau Maritime Training School (1996-1998); Department Head and later Deputy Director of the Licensing and Registration Department (1996-1999); Director of the Macau Maritime Administration (1999-2013); Director of the Marine and Water Bureau of Macau (2013-)

Wong Soi Man (Chinese: 黃穗文; Portuguese: Wong Soi Man; born 1967) is the Director of the Marine and Water Bureau of Macau.

== Life ==
Wong Soi Man was born in Guangzhou, Guangdong. In 1989, she graduated from Sun Yat-sen University with an Electronics degree. Wong later received a master's degree in Public Administration from the University of Macau in collaboration with the National Institute of Administration of Portugal, and another in Maritime Safety Administration from the World Maritime University.

From 1996 to July 1998, Wong served as the Principal of the Macau Maritime Training School and the Department Head of the Licensing and Registration Department. She also served as the Deputy Director of that department. Between August 1998 and May 1999, Wong served as the Deputy Director of the Macau Maritime Administration (later reorganised as the Marine and Water Bureau of Macau). From May 1999 to 2013, she served as the Director of the Macau Maritime Administration. Since 2013, following the reorganisation of the Macau Maritime Administration into the Marine and Water Bureau of Macau, Wong has served as its Director. She was the youngest government official in Macau at the time she assumed office.
