= Huang Daren =

Chinese mathematician (born 1945)

Huang Daren (simplified Chinese: 黄达人; traditional Chinese: 黃達人; born 1945) is a Chinese mathematician who served as President of Sun Yat-sen University from 1999 to 2010.

== Biography ==
Huang was born in April 1945 in Xiangshan County, Zhejiang, China. Huang did his undergraduate and postgraduate study in the Department of Mathematics, Zhejiang University.

After completion of his study, Huang joined the faculty of mathematics at Zhejiang university, and became a professor there in 1988. 1985–1986, he was a visiting scholar at the Department of Mathematics, University of South Carolina, United States. Huang served in several positions at Zhejiang University including the deputy director of the Department of Mathematics, the director of the Office of Academic Affairs, and the Vice-dean of Zhejiang university. 1992–1998, He was vice-president of Zhejiang University.

In November 1998, Huang was pointed as the vice-president of Sun Yat-sen University. In August 1999, he became President of Sun Yat-sen University.

Huang has been long-time active in the fields of linear operator approach, nonlinear approach & product formula, and optimum algorithm. He's also on medical image. At present, Huang is leading several national and provincial key scientific projects.
