= Jin Li =

Chinese geneticist

- 金力
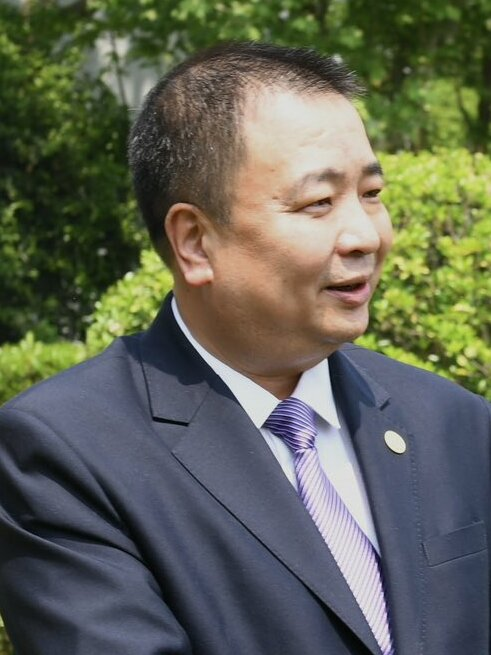

President of Fudan University
- Incumbent
- Assumed office 8 November 2021
- Preceded by: Xu Ningsheng

Personal details
- Born: March 1963 (age 63) Shanghai, China
- Party: Chinese Communist Party
- Education: Fudan University (BS, MS); University of Texas (PhD)
- Scientific career
- Other names: Felix Jin
- Known for: Recent African origin of modern humans
- Awards: Chinese Academy of Sciences Academician (2013); Cheung Kong Lecture Scholar (2000)
- Fields: Human evolutionary genetics, population genetics, bioinformatics
- Institutions: Fudan University; University of Texas Health Science Center at Houston; Stanford University; University of Cincinnati
- Thesis: Population genetics of VNTR loci and their applications in evolutionary studies (1994)
- Doctoral advisor: Ranajit Chakraborty
- Other academic advisors: Luigi Luca Cavalli-Sforza; Masatoshi Nei; Liu Zudong

Jin Li (Chinese: 金力; pinyin: Jīn Lì; born 1963) is a Chinese geneticist and academic administrator, currently serving as president of Fudan University since 2021. Jin joined Fudan University from the University of Cincinnati in 2003 to serve as dean of the Fudan University School of Life Sciences. He previously served as the university's executive vice president from 2019 to 2021, vice president from 2007 to 2019, and dean of the Graduate School from 2007 to 2011.

Jin is a professor at the National Human Genome Center and Fudan's Institute of Genetics, both in Shanghai. He is the principal investigator of East Asian populations for the Genographic Project which collects DNA samples to map historical human migration patterns around the world.

== Personal life and education ==
Jin was born in Shanghai. He earned bachelor's and master's degrees in genetics in 1985 and 1987 respectively, both at Fudan University, where he was a student of Tan Jiazhen. He then moved to the United States to earn his doctorate at the University of Texas Health Science Center at Houston, graduating in 1994. Jin was doing postdoctoral research at Stanford University that year when Tan, by then 86 years old, made a trip to the United States specifically to visit Jin to discuss the development of biology research in China and to offer him a position at Fudan. Jin eventually took up a part-time position at Fudan in 1997 before returning to China full-time in 2005. After his return, he renounced his U.S. permanent residency. He served as dean of Fudan's School of Life Sciences until 2008.

== Research ==
Jin is a leading proponent of the model of recent African origin of modern humans. His research presented evidence that the majority of the gene pools in China originated from Africa. His team analyzed the Y chromosomes of males around China and compared this group with those of Southeast Asians and Africans. Results of the analysis suggested that Southeast Asia was the first destination of the migration from Africa to Asia which began approximately 60,000 years ago; from there, migrants moved into Southern China, then crossing the Yangtze River to Northern China. He "could not find any evidence that is consistent with the hypothesis of independent origin in China" in the 1998 study which used genetic markers called microsatellites to compare Chinese populations. He stated that while his research does not necessarily rule out independent origin, the burden of proof has been shifted to those who believe in independent origin. The findings contrast with the hypothesis that the Peking Man was the ancestor of Chinese people.

Educational offices
Preceded by Gui Yonghao	Dean of Shanghai Medical College; 2020–present	Incumbent
Preceded by Xu Ningsheng	President of Fudan University; 2021–present	Incumbent
