= Sun Yat-sen University =

National public research university in China

- 中山大学
- Former name: National Kwangtung University
- Motto: 博学、审问、慎思、明辨、笃行
- Motto in English: Study Extensively, Inquire Accurately, Reflect Carefully, Discriminate Clearly, Practise Earnestly
- Type: Public research university
- Established: 5 June 1924; 102 years ago
- Founder: Sun Yat-sen
- Affiliations: Project 985; Project 211; APAIE; The Peking Union; Guangdong-Hong Kong-Macao University Alliance
- Budget: ¥21.4 billion (2026)
- Chair: Chenggong Liu
- President: Hongwu Tang
- Faculty: 10,566
- Undergraduates: 34,096
- Postgraduates: 37,008
- Location: 135 XinGangxi Road, Haizhu District, Guangzhou, Guangzhou (South, North and East Campus)/ Zhuhai (Zhuhai Campus)/ Shenzhen (Shenzhen Campus), Guangdong, 510275, People's Republic of China
- Campus: Urban, 9.15 km^{2}
- Website: sysu.edu.cn

Chinese name
- Simplified Chinese: 中山大学
- Traditional Chinese: 中山大學
Transcriptions
Standard Mandarin
- Hanyu Pinyin: Zhōngshān Dàxué
Yue: Cantonese
- Jyutping: zung1 saan1 daai6 hok6

Sun Yat-sen University (Chinese: 中山大学; pinyin: Zhōngshān Dàxué; also SYSU) is a public university in Guangzhou, Guangdong, China. It is affiliated with the Ministry of Education and co-funded by the Ministry of Education, SASTIND, and Guangdong Provincial People's Government. As one of the top universities in China, it is part of Project 211, Project 985, and the Double First-Class Construction.

The university was founded in 1924 by and named after Sun Yat-sen, a revolutionary who founded the Republic of China. The university's main campus, commonly referred to as the South Campus, is located in Haizhu, Guangzhou, inheriting the campus from the former Lingnan University (est. 1888). The university has five campuses in the three cities of Guangzhou, Zhuhai and Shenzhen, and ten affiliated hospitals.

The SYSU organised centennial celebration conference on November 12, 2024, where a number of initiatives were announced for the future.

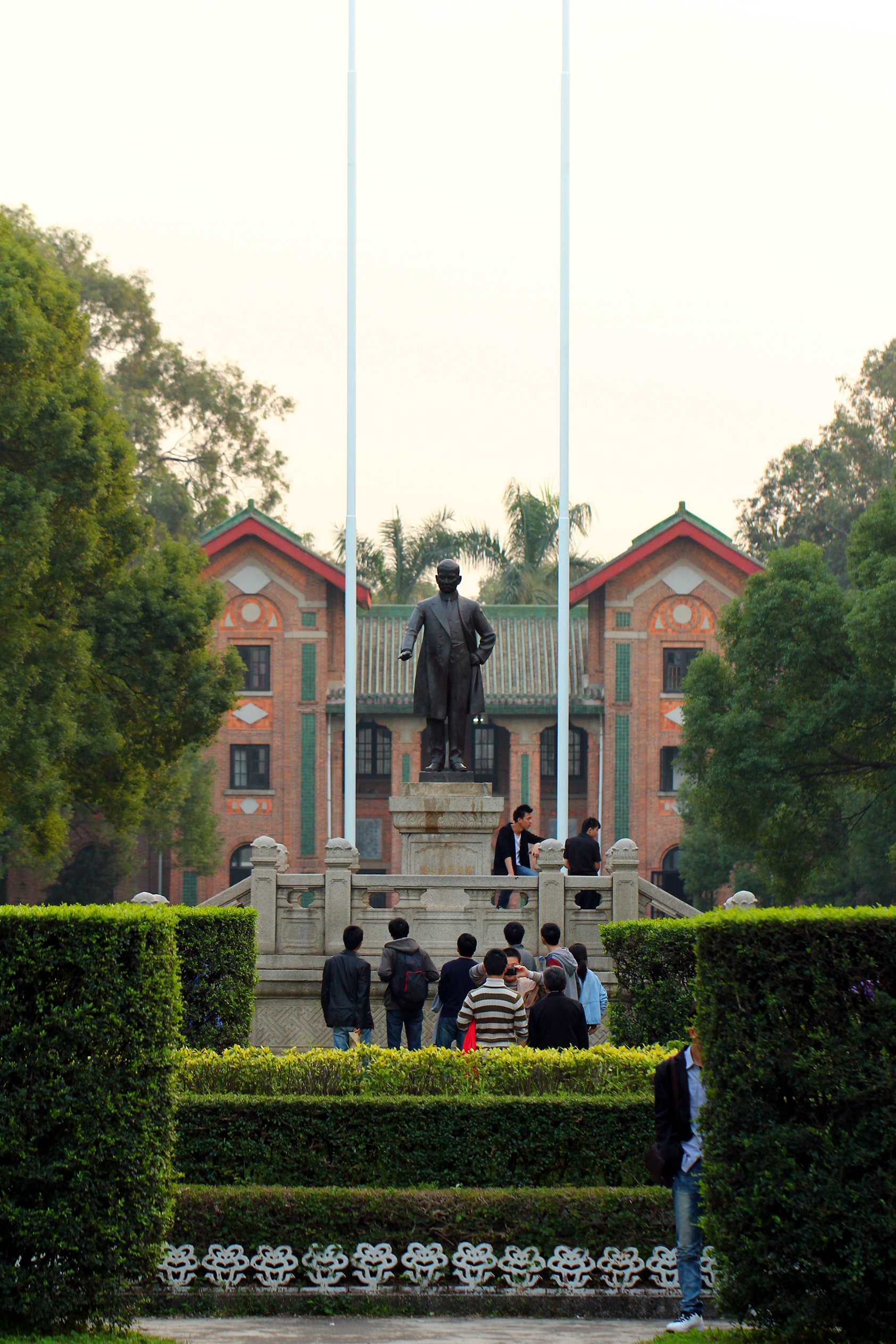
Sun Yat-sen Statue in front of Swasey Hall

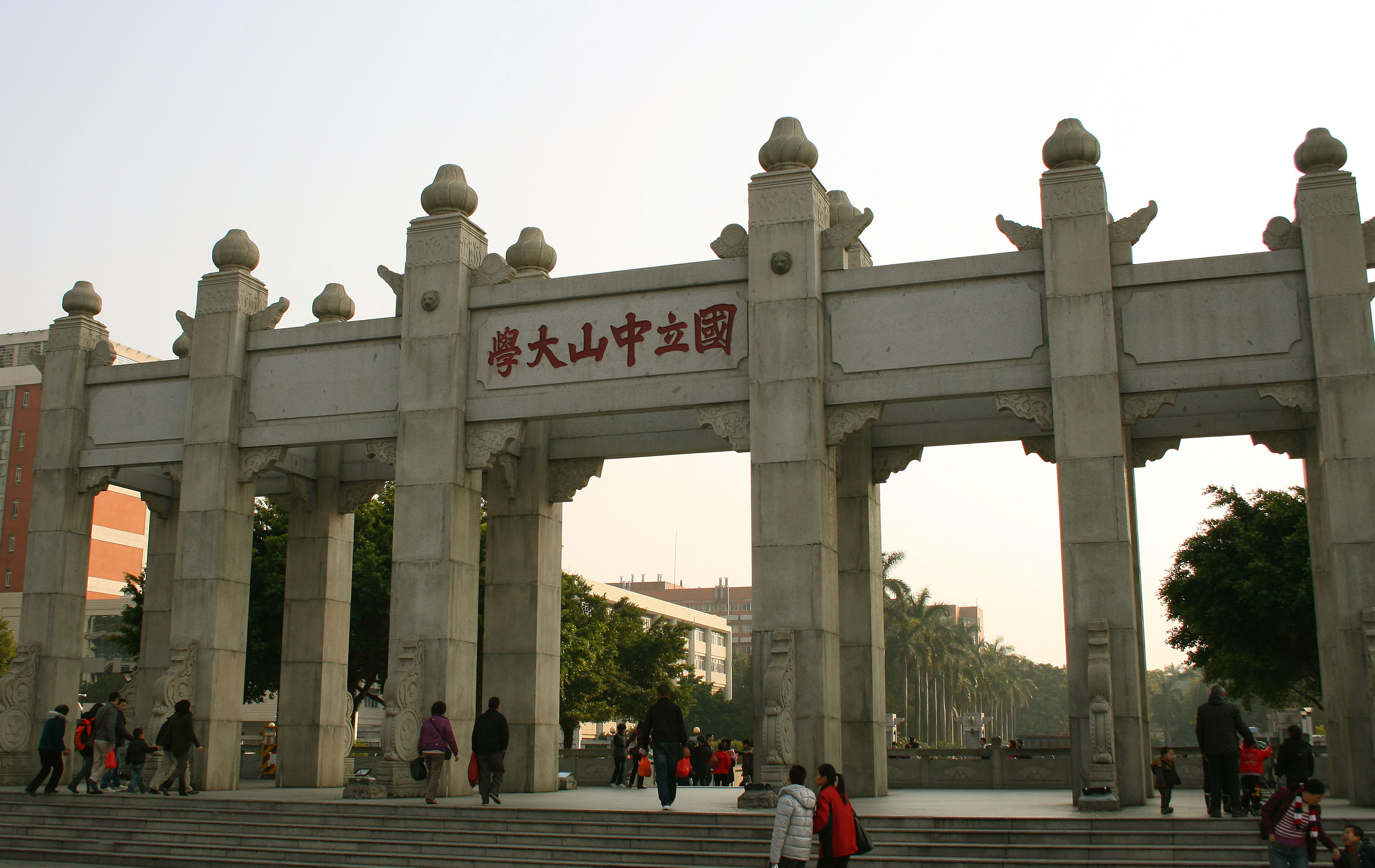
North Gate of South Campus

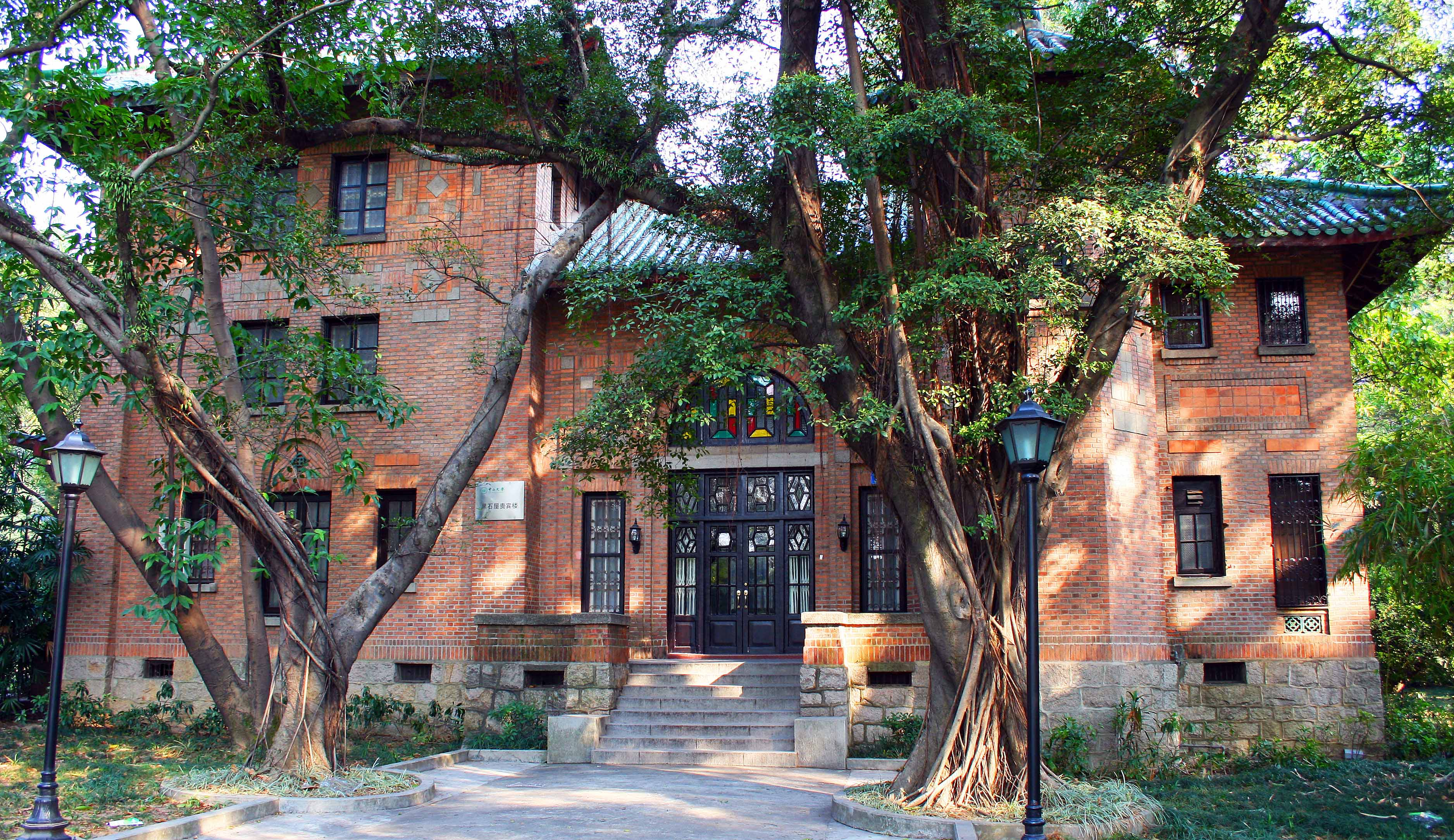
Blackstone Lodge

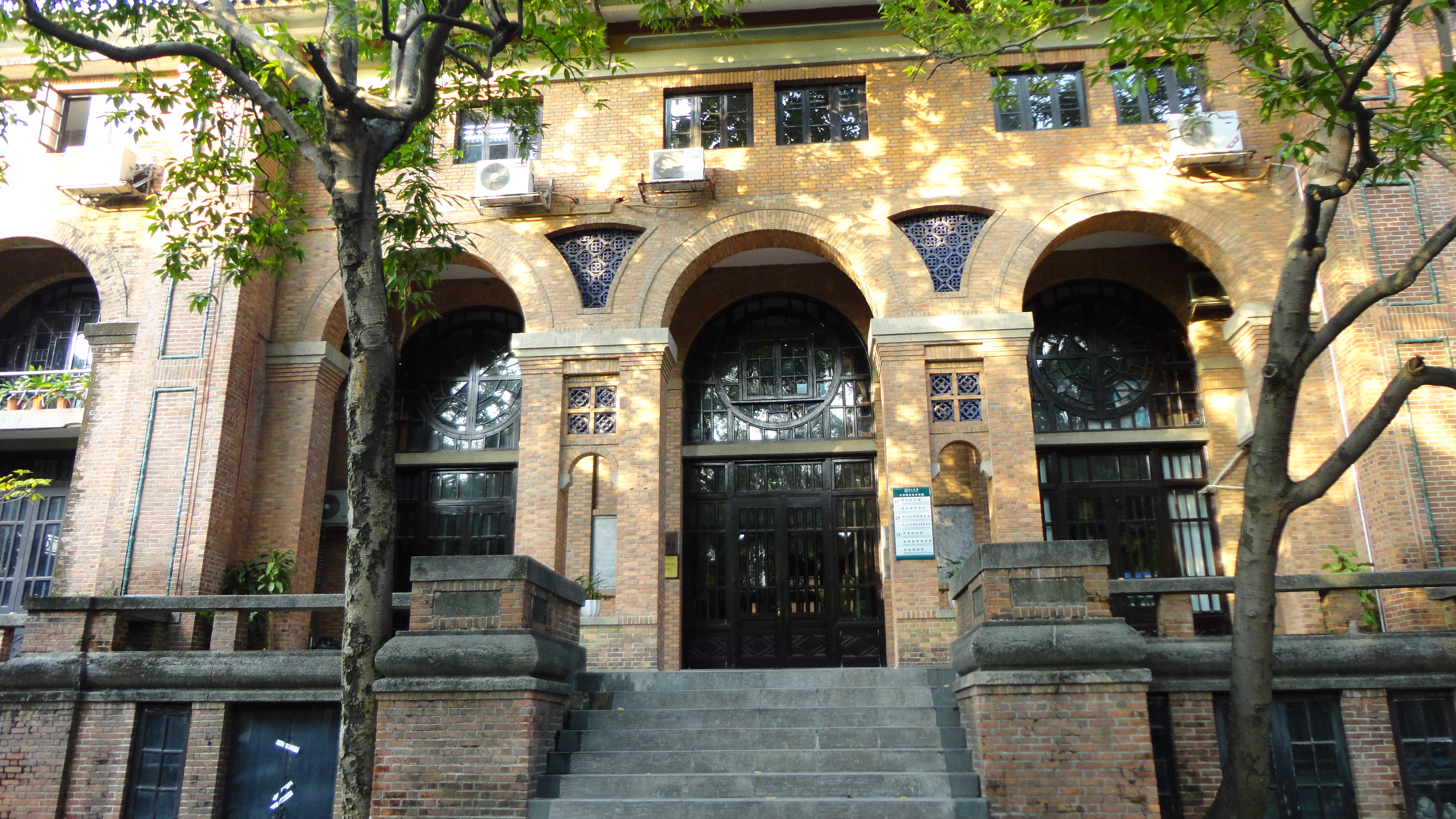
Grand Hall

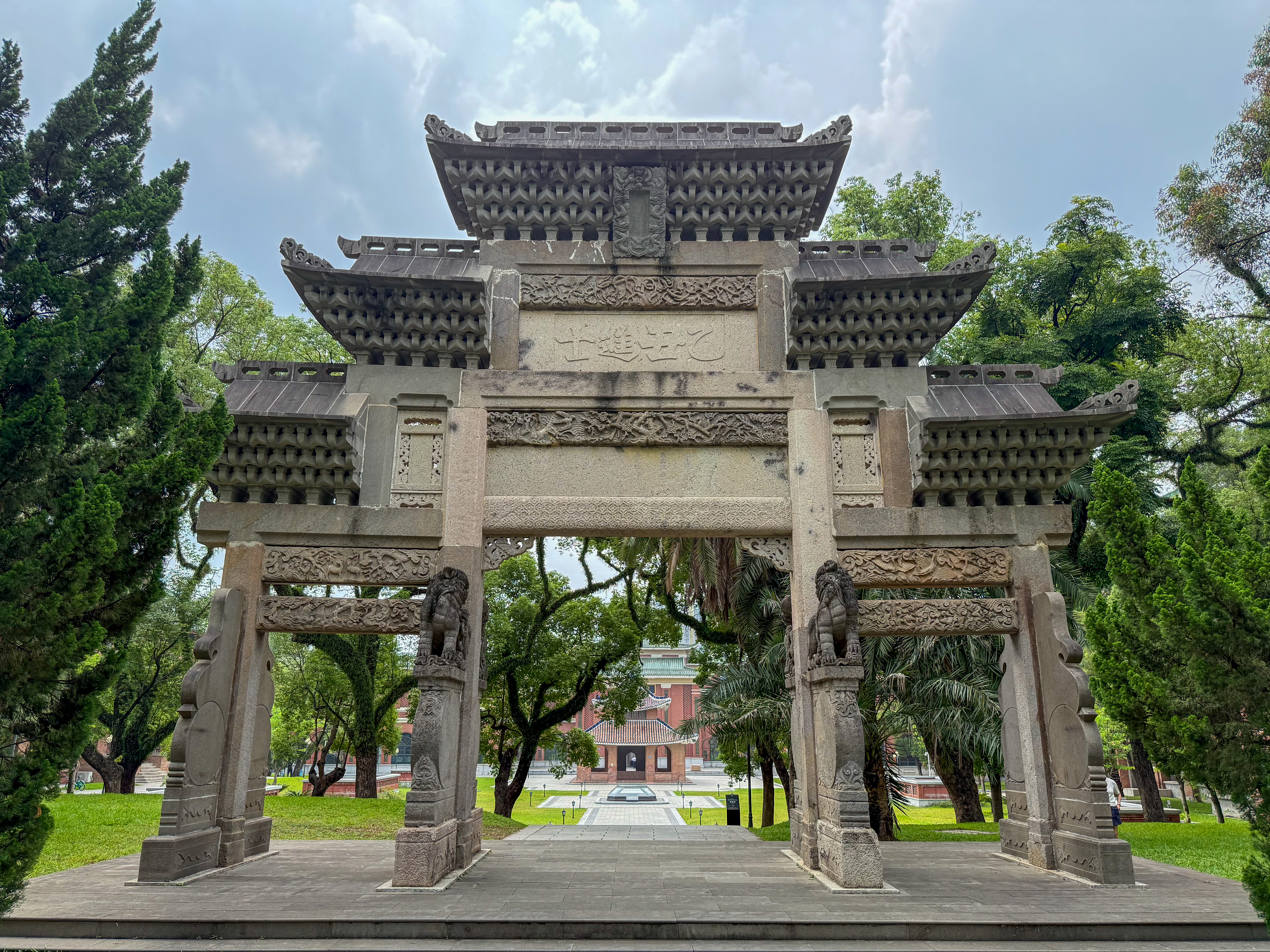
Yichou Scholar Memorial Gate

== History ==
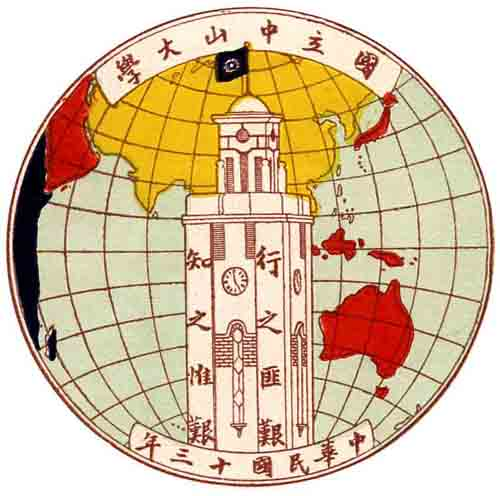
University Seal, 1932-1949

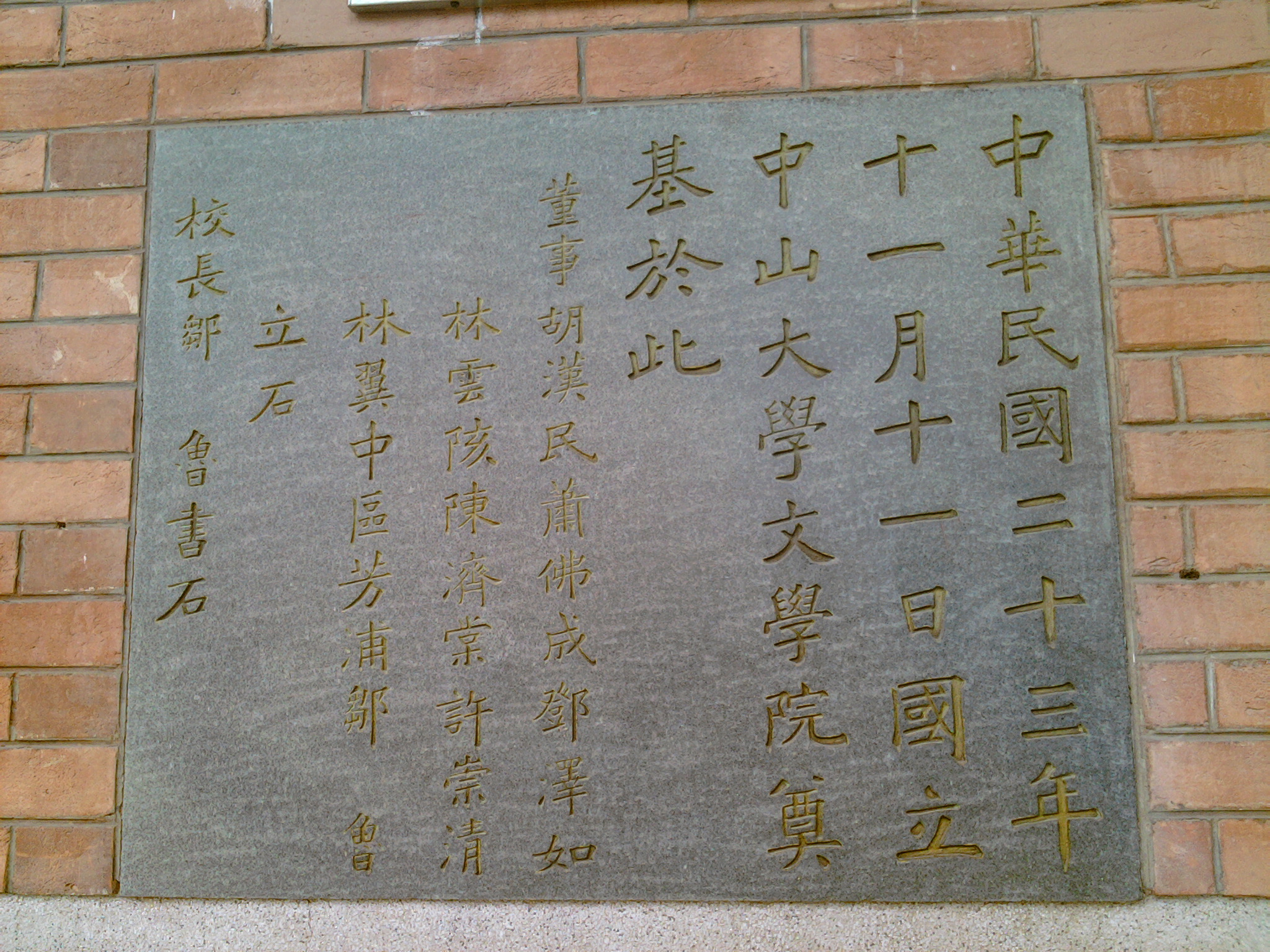
National Sun Yat-sen University

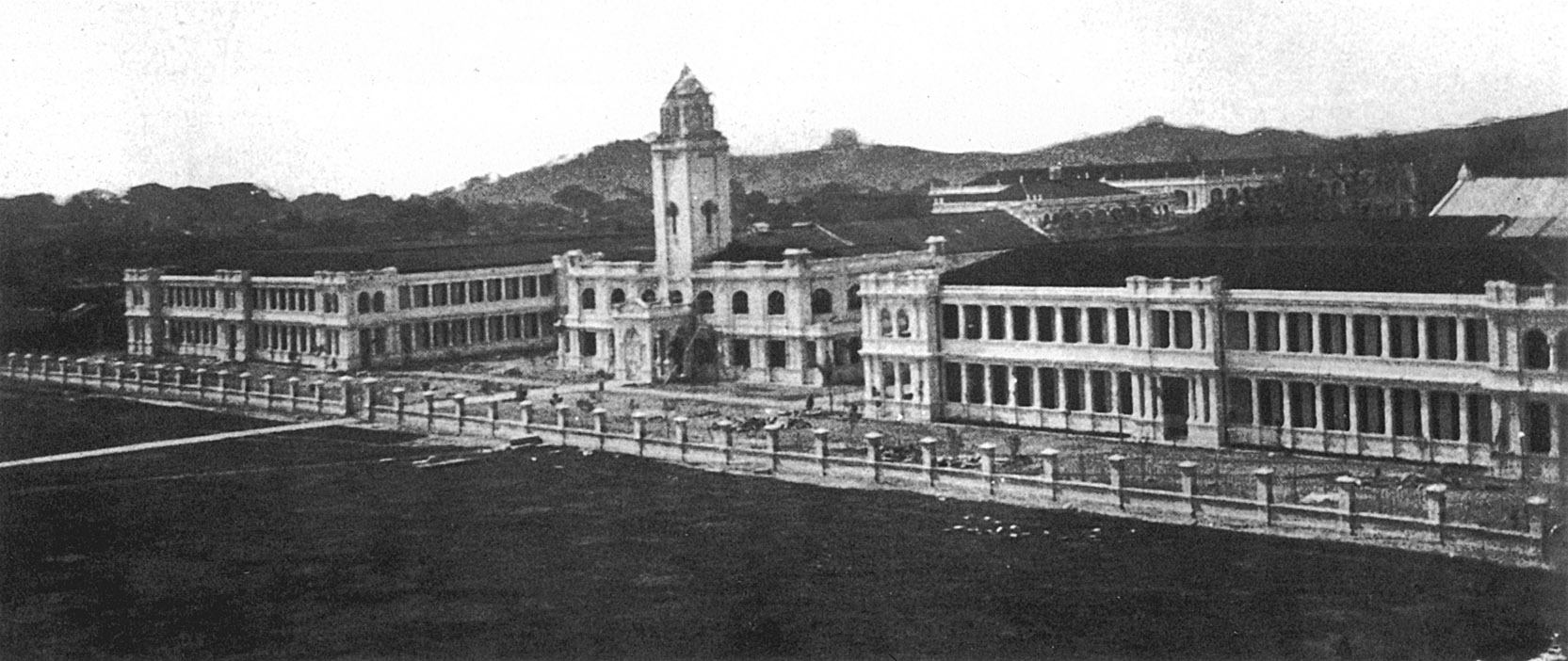
Wenming Road Campus, 1924-1935

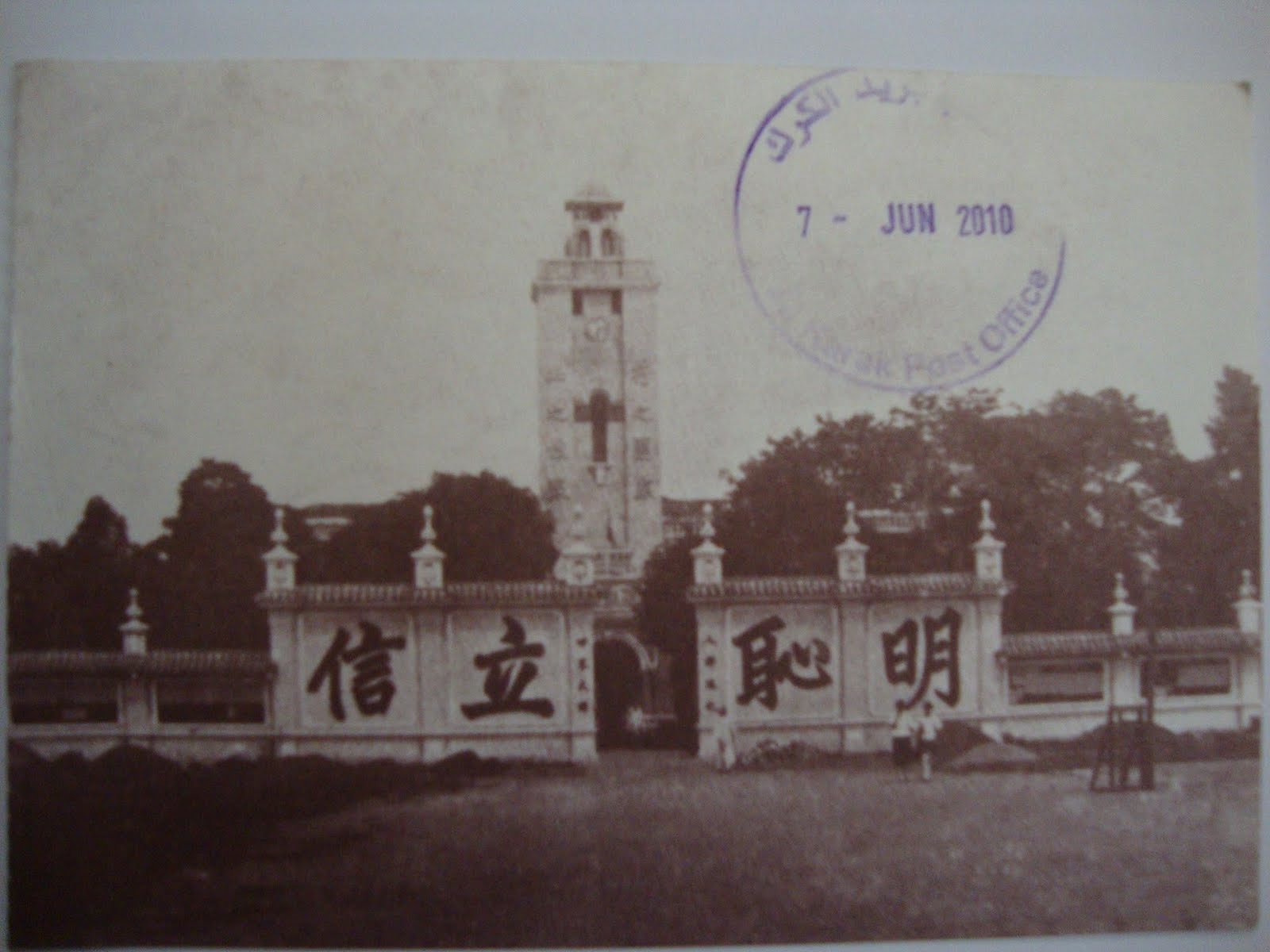
Bell Tower, Hosting space of the 1st National Congress of Kuomintang (KMT).

Originally, each of the Sun Yat-sen Universities adopted a statism educational model (中山大学模式) based on Sun Yat-sen's political philosophy. The present-day Sun Yat-sen University is the result of multiple mergers as well as splits and restructurings that have involved more than a dozen academic institutions over time. The most recent merger happened in 2001, when Sun Yat-sen University of Medical Science merged with Sun Yat-sen University and became Sun Yat-sen College of Medical Science.

=== Sun Yat-sen University ===
In 1924, Sun Yat-sen founded National Kwangtung University (國立廣東大學) in Canton and inscribed in his own handwriting the school motto of "Study Extensively, Enquire Accurately, Reflect Carefully, Discriminate Clearly, Practise Earnestly." After the death of Sun Yat-sen, the Nationalist government that was set up during the first cooperation between the Communists and Nationalists formally decreed to change its name to National Sun Yat-sen University (国立中山大学) on July 17, 1926, in memory of Sun Yat-sen. In 1926, there were four National Sun Yat-sen Universities: National First Sun Yat-sen University in Canton (the current Sun Yat-sen University), National Second Sun Yat-sen University in Wuhan (the current Wuhan University), National Third Sun Yat-sen University in Hangzhou (the current Zhejiang University), National Fourth Sun Yat-sen University in Nanking (the predecessor of the current Nanjing University, Southeast University, and National Central University). The Nationalist government also planned to organise the National Fifth Sun Yat-sen University in Zhengzhou, but end up naming it as the Henan Provincial Sun Yat-sen University (the current Henan University).

In the 1930s, there were seven schools in the University: the Schools of Arts, Sciences, Law, Engineering, Agricultural Studies, Medicine and Education. In 1935, National Sun Yat-sen University, concurrently with National Tsinghua University and National Peking University, set up the first graduate schools in China and began to enroll graduate students.

In 1949, the University removed its prefix "National" and has been thereafter referred directly to Sun Yat-sen University (中山大学). In the 1950s, colleges, schools and departments were readjusted nationwide, and Sun Yat-sen University became a national top-tier comprehensive university with the liberal arts and sciences as its backbone disciplines.

=== Sun Yat-sen University of Medical Sciences ===
One of the predecessors of the Sun Yat-sen University of Medical Science was the Pok Tsai Medical School, which, founded in 1866, was the earliest institution of learning of western medicine in China, where Sun Yat-sen once studied and engaged in revolutionary activities.

The Pok Tsai Medical School evolved into the College of Medicine of Lingnan University in 1936. The Kung Yee Medical School and Hospital in Guangzhou (Canton) was founded in 1908. In 1925, the Kung Yee institutions were taken over by the government and became the Medical Department of the National First Sun Yat-sen (Zhongshan) University. In 1953, the Colleges of Medicine in Sun Yat-sen University and Lingnan University merged to form the College of Medicine of South China, which was joined by the Guangdong Guanghua College of Medicine in 1954. The university was renamed Guangzhou College of Medicine and Sun Yat-sen College of Medical Science successively, and finally Sun Yat-sen University of Medical Science in 1985, which has developed steadfastly into a comprehensive medical university with multi-schools and multiple levels, has reached national advanced level and achieved remarkable successes in scientific research in medical genetics, ophthalmology, tumor study, parasite study, the kidney disease of internal medicine, organ transplant, infectious liver disease, biological medical project and molecular medical science. In 2001, Sun Yat-sen University of Medical Science merged with Sun Yat-sen University and became Sun Yat-sen College of Medical Science.

=== Lingnan University ===
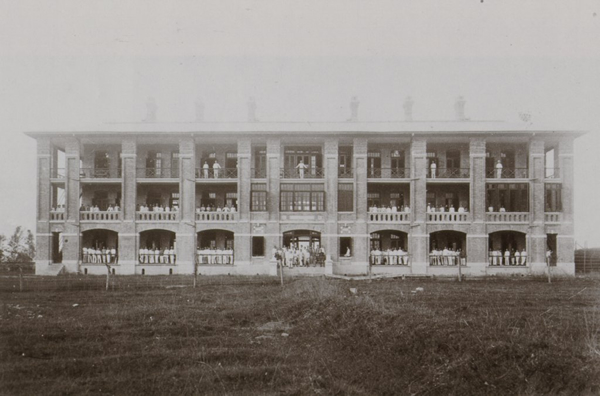
Martin Hall of Lingnan University, 1907

Lingnan University (Chinese: 嶺南大學) was a private university established by Andrew Happer, MD and a group of American missionaries in Guangzhou in 1888. At its founding it was named Canton Christian College (格致書院).

The Hackett Medical College for Women (夏葛女子醫學院, the first medical college for women in China) and its affiliated hospital known as David Gregg Hospital for Women and Children (柔濟醫院), located in Guangzhou, China, were parts of a medical centre that was founded by female medical missionary Mary H. Fulton (1854–1927). Fulton was sent by the Foreign Missions Board of the Presbyterian Church (USA), with the support of the Lafayette Avenue Presbyterian Church of Brooklyn, New York, of which David Gregg was pastor The college was dedicated in 1902 and offered a four-year medical curriculum. At the end of 1932, the medical center was registered and put under the control of the Chinese government. Furthermore, it affiliated with Guangzhou Hospital and Lingnan University to form the Sun Yat-Sen Medical College in 1936.

Lingnan University was incorporated into Sun Yat-sen University in 1953 under the order of the Communist Party's government. Members of the university moved to Hong Kong and founded the Lingnan School in Wan Chai in 1967, which was relocated to Tuen Mun in the mid-1990s and renamed Lingnan University in 1999. In 1988, Lingnan College was reestablished within Sun Yat-sen University and is now one of the top schools of economics and management in China.

== Rankings and reputation ==
University rankings
BCUR National	Domestic	12
Wu Shulian National	Domestic	8
CUAA National	Alumni	13
QS National	General	14
THE National	General	14–19
QS Asia (Asia version)	General	=48
THE Asia (Asia version)	General	47
ARWU World	Research	62
QS World	General	=258
THE World	General	=205
USNWR World	General	74

Sun Yat-sen University is ranked as one of the top universities in China by all the most influential and widely observed international university rankings, for example, #7 nationwide in Times Higher Education World University Rankings 2015, #6 nationwide in the Academic Ranking of World Universities 2015, and #8 nationwide in U.S. News Global University Ranking 2015.

The Times Higher Education 2011 placed Sun Yat-sen University 171st in the world and 5th in China, and the university is regarded as one of the most reputable Chinese universities by the Times Higher Education World Reputation Rankings where it ranked 151st globally. Sun Yat-sen graduates employability rankings placed at #191 in the world in the QS Graduate Employability Rankings.

As of 2026, SYSU was ranked #62 globally, #10 in Asia and #7 in China by the Academic Ranking of World Universities, It was also ranked #74 in the world, #15 in Asia and #8 in China by the U.S. News Global University Ranking. The university was ranked #81 worldwide, #13 in Asia and # 7 in China by the Center for World University Rankings.

The 2025 CWTS Leiden Ranking ranked SYSU 7th in the world by total publications and #26 in the world based on the number of their scientific publications belonging to the top 1% in their fields for the time period 2020–2023.

=== Nature Index ===
Nature Index tracks the affiliations of high-quality scientific articles and presents research outputs by institution and country on monthly basis. Regarding scientific research output, the Nature Index 2024 ranked SYSU the No. 7 university in the Asia Pacific region, and 8th in the world among the global universities.

Year	Rank	Valuer
2024	8	Nature Index - Academic Institutions - Global
2024	7	Nature Index - Academic Institutions - China

== Academics ==
=== Statistics (2018) ===
Total Full-time Faculty	17,022
Professors	2,266
Associate Professors	2,898
Full-time Students	65,638
Undergraduate Students	32,220
Graduate Students for master's degree	13,351
Doctoral Students	5,961
Undergraduate Majors	130
Doctorate Programs	49
Master's Degree Programs	59
Professional Degree Programs	30
Post-doctoral Research Stations	41
Annual Research Funding (million USD)	$454
Annual Budget (billion USD)	$2.5

=== Faculties and Schools ===
Sun Yat-sen University has made several adjustments to its academic departments throughout its history. Starting from the end of 2022, Sun Yat-sen University has implemented a three-tier academic governance system consisting of "University-Faculties-Schools (Departments)." As of now, the university comprises a total of 65 schools (including directly affiliated departments and teaching units), which are divided among seven faculties: the Faculty of Humanities, the Faculty of Social Sciences, the Faculty of Economics and Management, the Faculty of Natural Sciences, the Faculty of Engineering, the Faculty of Information Science and Technology, and the Faculty of Medicine. These schools are spread across five campuses.

Schools and Departments	Faculties	Campuses
Department of Chinese Language and Literature	Faculty of Humanities	Guangzhou South Campus
Department of History	Faculty of Humanities	Guangzhou South Campus
Department of Philosophy	Faculty of Humanities	Guangzhou South Campus
School of Foreign Languages	Faculty of Humanities	Guangzhou South Campus
School of Art	Faculty of Humanities	Guangzhou South Campus
Liberal Arts College (Boya College)	Faculty of Humanities	Guangzhou South Campus
Department of Chinese Language and Literature (Zhuhai)	Faculty of Humanities	Zhuhai Campus
Department of History (Zhuhai)	Faculty of Humanities	Zhuhai Campus
Department of Philosophy (Zhuhai)	Faculty of Humanities	Zhuhai Campus
School of International Studies	Faculty of Humanities	Zhuhai Campus
School of Sociology and Anthropology	Faculty of Social Sciences	Guangzhou South Campus
School of Government	Faculty of Social Sciences	Guangzhou East Campus
School of Law	Faculty of Social Sciences	Guangzhou East Campus
School of Marxism	Faculty of Social Sciences	Guangzhou South Campus
Department of Psychology	Faculty of Social Sciences	Guangzhou South Campus
School of Journalism and Communication	Faculty of Social Sciences	Guangzhou East Campus
School of Information Management	Faculty of Social Sciences	Guangzhou East Campus
School of International Relations	Faculty of Social Sciences	Zhuhai Campus
Department of Physical Education	Faculty of Social Sciences	Guangzhou South Campus
Lingnan (University) College	Faculty of Economics and Management	Guangzhou South Campus
School of Business (SYSBS)	Faculty of Economics and Management	Guangzhou East Campus
School of Tourism Management	Faculty of Economics and Management	Zhuhai Campus
International School of Business and Finance	Faculty of Economics and Management	Zhuhai Campus
Business School	Faculty of Economics and Management	Shenzhen Campus
School of Mathematics	Faculty of Natural Sciences	Guangzhou South Campus
School of Physics	Faculty of Natural Sciences	Guangzhou South Campus
School of Chemistry	Faculty of Natural Sciences	Guangzhou East Campus
School of Life Sciences	Faculty of Natural Sciences	Guangzhou South Campus
School of Geography and Planning	Faculty of Natural Sciences	Guangzhou South Campus
School of Mathematics (Zhuhai)	Faculty of Natural Sciences	Zhuhai Campus
School of Physics and Astronomy	Faculty of Natural Sciences	Zhuhai Campus
School of Science	Faculty of Natural Sciences	Shenzhen Campus
School of Earth Science and Geological Engineering	Faculty of Natural Sciences	Zhuhai Campus
School of Atmospheric Sciences	Faculty of Natural Sciences	Zhuhai Campus
School of Marine Sciences	Faculty of Natural Sciences	Zhuhai Campus
School of Ecology	Faculty of Natural Sciences	Shenzhen Campus
School of Agriculture	Faculty of Natural Sciences	Shenzhen Campus
School of Chemical Engineering and Technology	Faculty of Engineering	Zhuhai Campus
School of Materials Science and Engineering	Faculty of Engineering	Guangzhou East Campus
School of Environmental Science and Engineering	Faculty of Engineering	Guangzhou East Campus
School of Systems Science and Engineering	Faculty of Engineering	Guangzhou East Campus
The Sino-French Institute of Nuclear Engineering & Technology	Faculty of Engineering	Zhuhai Campus
School of Civil Engineering	Faculty of Engineering	Zhuhai Campus
School of Geospatial Engineering and Science	Faculty of Engineering	Zhuhai Campus
School of Marine Sciences	Faculty of Engineering	Zhuhai Campus
School of Aeronautics and Astronautics	Faculty of Engineering	Shenzhen Campus
School of Materials	Faculty of Engineering	Shenzhen Campus
School of Intelligent Systems Engineering	Faculty of Engineering	Shenzhen Campus
School of Biomedical Engineering	Faculty of Engineering	Shenzhen Campus
School of Advanced Energy	Faculty of Engineering	Shenzhen Campus
School of Advanced Manufacture	Faculty of Engineering	Shenzhen Campus
School of Computer Science and Technology	Faculty of Information Science and Technology	Guangzhou East Campus
School of Electronics and Information Technology	Faculty of Information Science and Technology	Guangzhou East Campus
School of Microelectronics Science and Technology	Faculty of Information Science and Technology	Zhuhai Campus
School of Artificial Intelligence	Faculty of Information Science and Technology	Zhuhai Campus
School of Software Engineering	Faculty of Information Science and Technology	Zhuhai Campus
School of Electronics and Communication Engineering	Faculty of Information Science and Technology	Shenzhen Campus
School of Integrated Circuits	Faculty of Information Science and Technology	Shenzhen Campus
School of Cyber Science and Technology	Faculty of Information Science and Technology	Shenzhen Campus
Zhongshan School of Medicine	Faculty of Medicine	Guangzhou North Campus, Shenzhen Campus
School of Public Health	Faculty of Medicine	Guangzhou North Campus
School of Pharmaceutical Sciences	Faculty of Medicine	Guangzhou East Campus, Shenzhen Campus
School of Nursing	Faculty of Medicine	Guangzhou North Campus
Guanghua School of Stomatology	Faculty of Medicine	Guangzhou North Campus
School of Biosafety	Faculty of Medicine	Shenzhen Campus

==== Lingnan (University) College ====
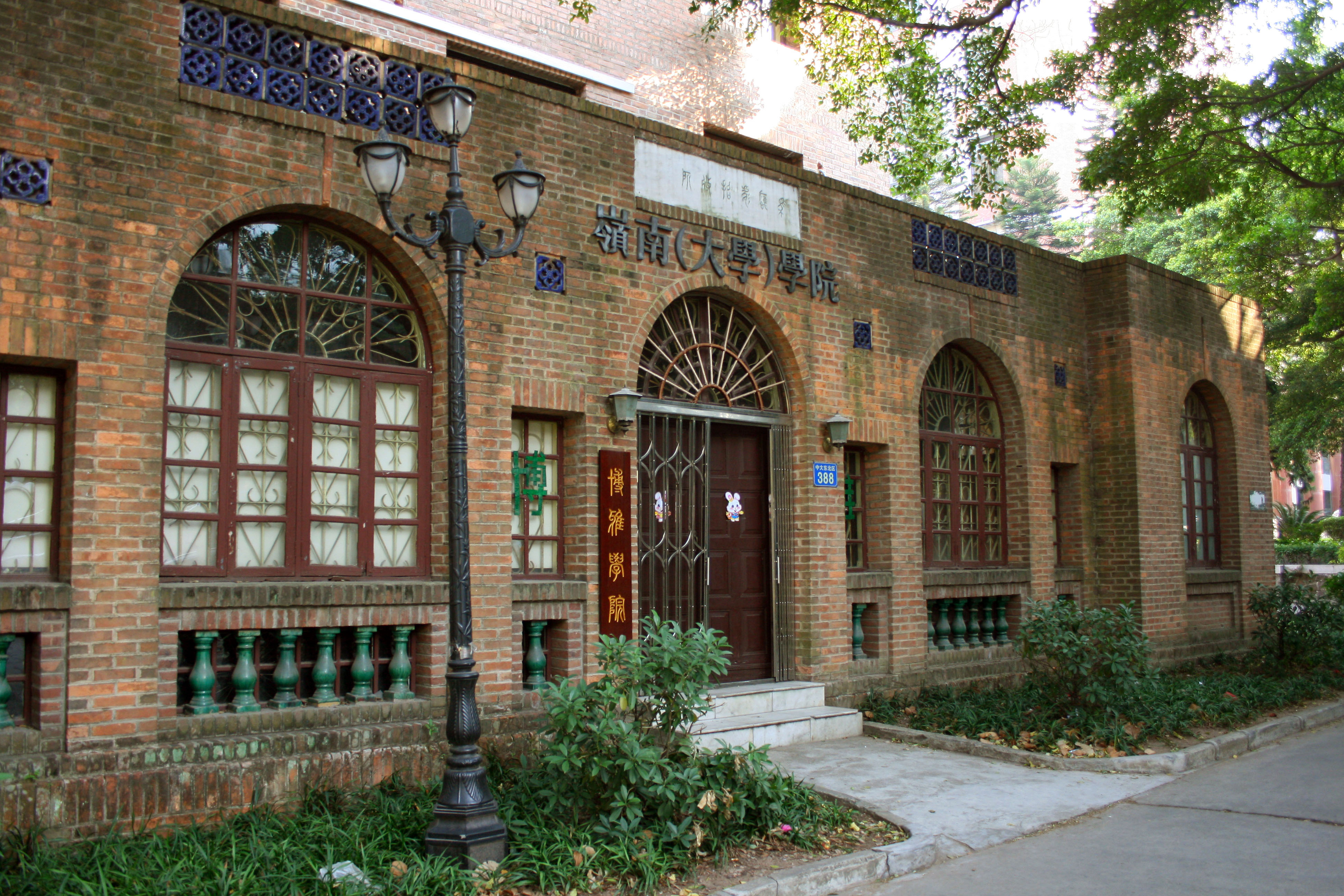
Lingnan (University) College

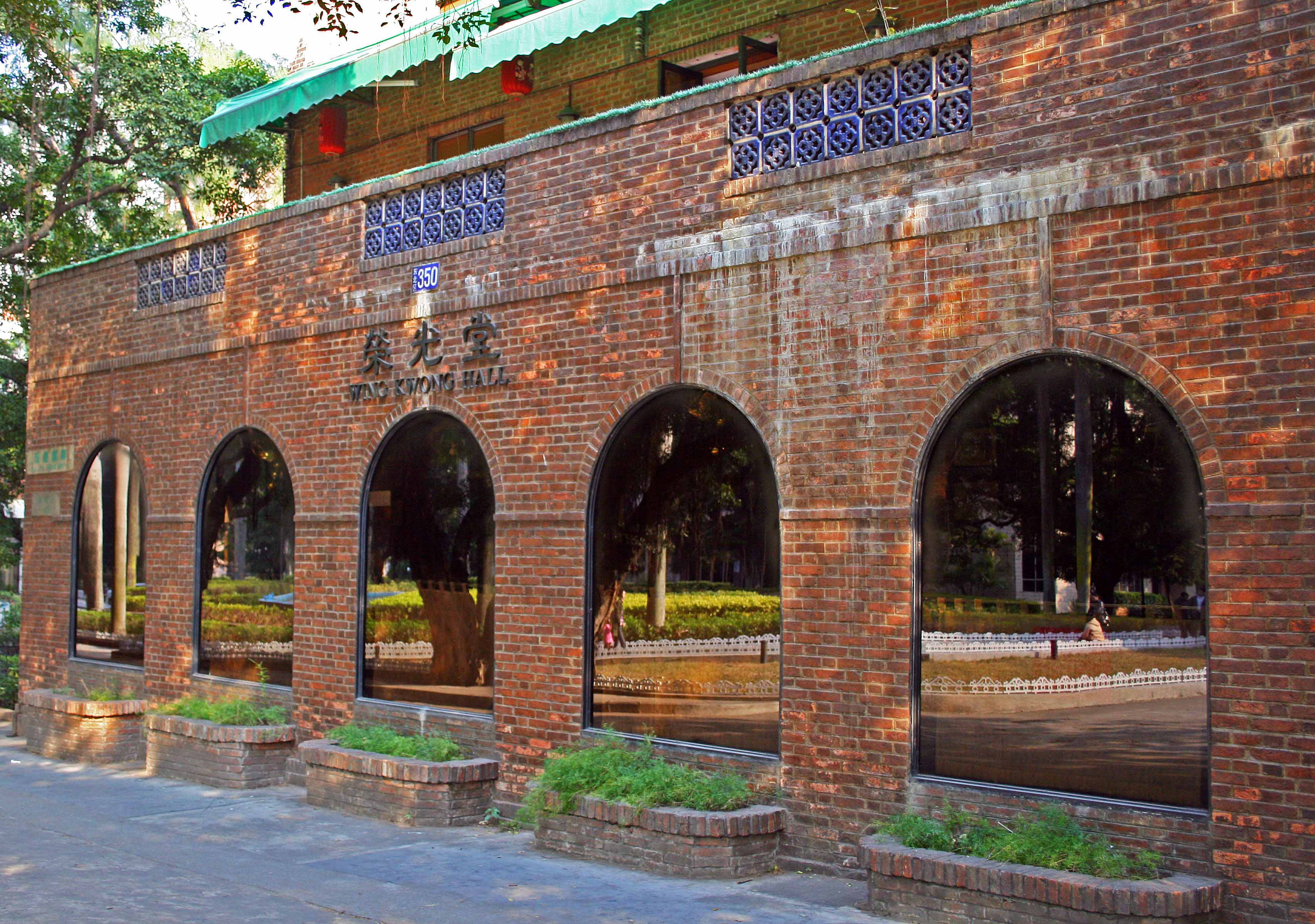
Wing Kwong Hall

Since 2015, Lingnan (University) college is also triple-accredited by AACSB, EQUIS and AMBA. The college is originated from Lingnan University (Chinese: 岭南大学), a renowned private university established by a group of American missionaries in 1888.

=== Affiliated hospitals ===
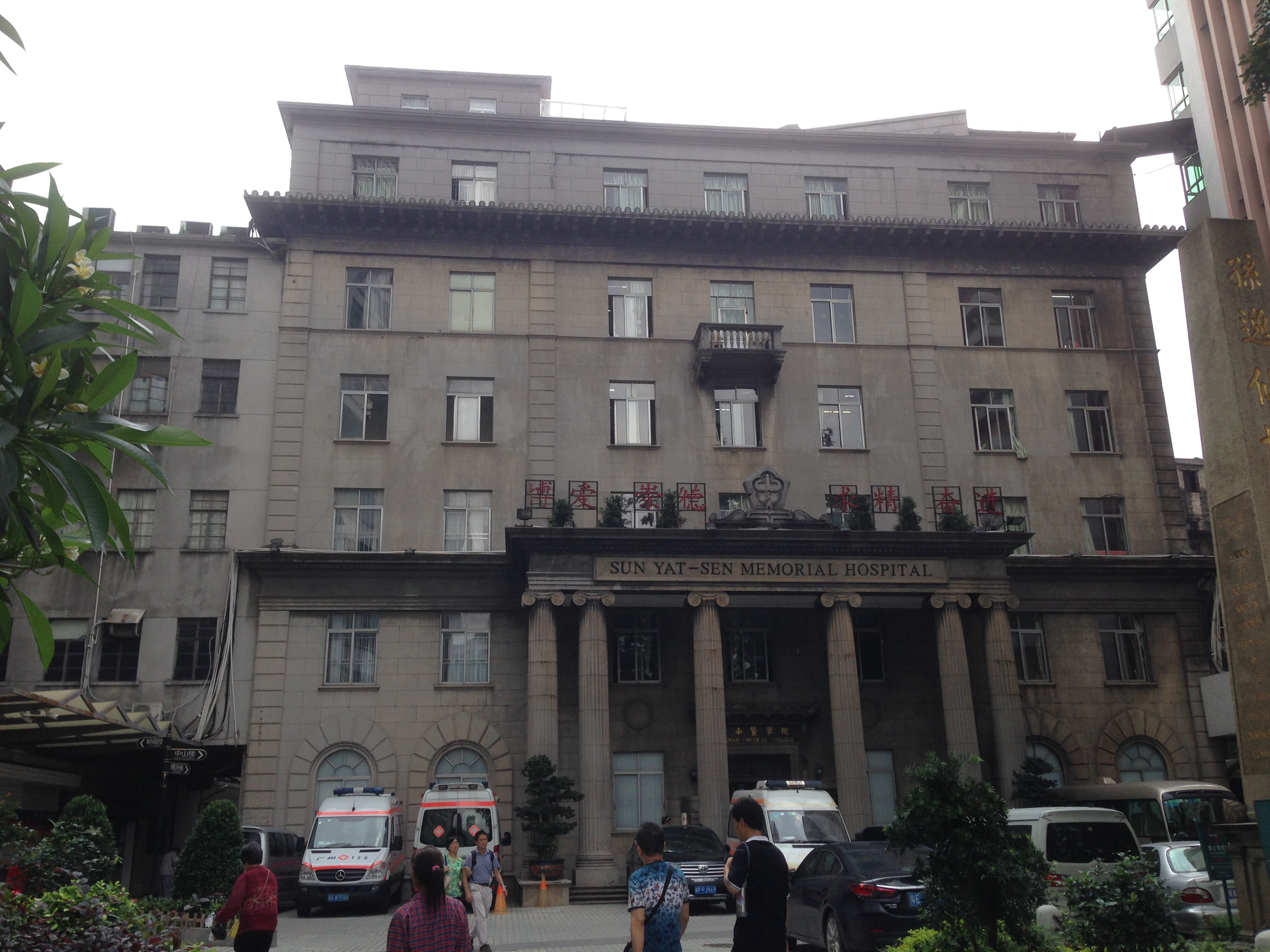
Sun Yat-sen Memorial Hospital

The university has the largest affiliated hospital system in China, including Sun Yat-sen University First Hospital, Sun Yat-sen Memorial Hospital (or Sun Yat-sen University Second Hospital), Sun Yat-sen University Third Hospital, Sun Yat-sen University Fourth Hospital (has merged into the First Hospital), Sun Yat-sen University Fifth Hospital (or Zhuhai Hospital), Sun Yat-sen University Sixth Hospital (or Sun Yat-sen University Gastrointestinal & Anal Hospital), Sun Yat-sen University Cancer Center, Sun Yat-sen University Stomatologic Hospital, Sun Yat-sen University Ophthalmologic Center, Sun Yat-sen University Seventh Hospital (Shenzhen), Sun Yat-sen University Eighth Hospital (Shenzhen). All eight general hospitals, the Sun Yat-sen University Cancer Center and Sun Yat-sen University Ophthalmology Center are 3A class hospitals.

==== The First Affiliated Hospital, SYSU ====
The First Affiliated Hospital, Sun Yat-sen University was established in 1910, initially called the Affiliated Hospital of Guangdong Public Institution of Medicine. As a 3A hospital (the top level in China), the hospital is the largest and the most comprehensive one among all affiliated hospitals of SYSU, as well as one of the largest hospitals in the country.

- Sun Yat-sen University First Hospital is ranked #2 in "Top 10 General Hospital in China" rankings.

==== Sun Yat-Sen Memorial Hospital, SYSU ====
Founded as Ophthalmic Hospital in Canton by American Peter Parker in 1835. It originally dealt with diseases of the eye, but later treated other ailments. It later became the Canton Hospital.

==== Sun Yat-sen University Cancer Center ====
Sun Yat-sen University Cancer Center is a level III (highest rank in China) and class A hospital. It was awarded as "key subject of China" in 2001. In 1980, SYSUCC was designated as World Health Organization (WHO) Collaborating Center for research on cancer. Since 2003, SYSUCC became a sister institution of the University of Texas MD Anderson Cancer Center. In 2004, SYSUCC has set up a joint laboratory with Karolinska Institutet of Sweden for research in immunotherapy, molecular virology and oncological epidemiology.

- Sun Yat-sen University Cancer Center is ranked #1 in "Top 10 Cancer Hospitals in China" rankings.

==== Zhongshan Ophthalmic Center (ZOC) of Sun Yat-sen University ====
Zhongshan Ophthalmic Center (ZOC) of Sun Yat-sen University is the first and leading advanced ophthalmic centre and the last resort for advanced eye care in China, integrating eye care, teaching, eye research and blindness prevention. It is also one of the 20 largest general ophthalmic centres in the world. In 2006, the ZOC was approved to be the State Key Laboratory of Ophthalmology, the only one of its kind in China.

- ZOC is ranked #1 in "Best Ophthalmologic Hospitals in China" rankings.

=== Sun Yat-sen University Libraries ===
The university's system of libraries is one of the largest in China. By December 2012, it held more than 6 million paper volumes, including periodicals.

==== The Hilles Collection ====
In June 2005, Harvard College Library of Harvard University donated 158,000 volumes in Hilles Library to Sun Yat-sen University. Developed over a century, the collection is composed of titles in the humanities and social sciences, primarily in English, but also in Western foreign languages.

=== Confucius Institutes ===
Sun Yat-sen University has established five Confucius Institutes since 2006:

- The Confucius Institute at Ateneo de Manila University
- The Confucius Institute in Indianapolis, established together with Indiana University-Purdue University Indianapolis
- The Confucius Institute at Autonomous University of Yucatan
- The Confucius Institute in Lyon, established together with Lumière University Lyon 2 and Jean Moulin University Lyon 3
- The Confucius Institute at University of Cape Town.

== Research ==
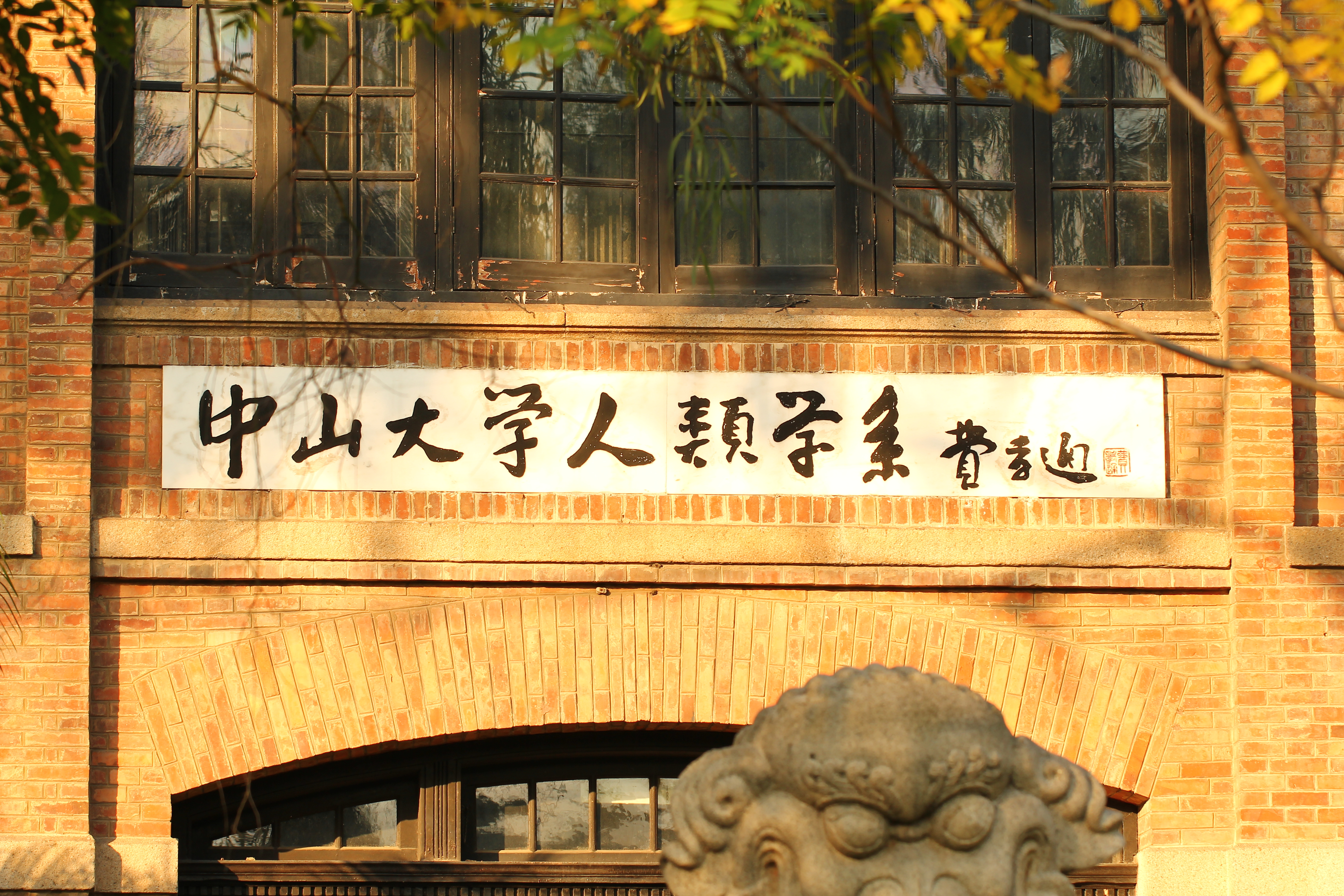
Martin Hall

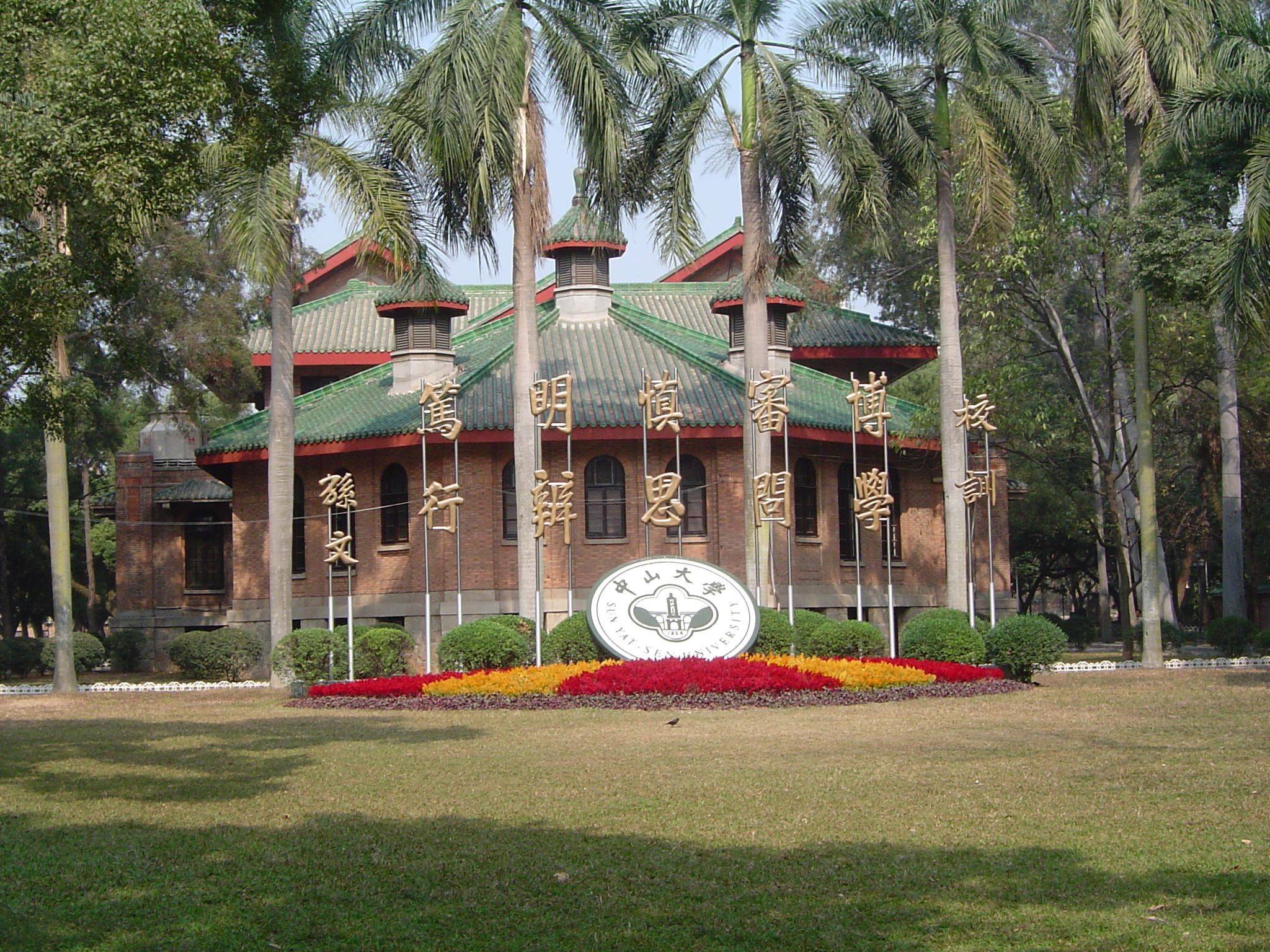
Motto

=== Essential Science Indicators (ESI) ===
According to statistics of the Essential Science Indicators (ESI) database from January 2003 to February 2013, the total number of citations of papers in 15 disciplines of Sun Yat-sen University entered global top 1%. Following Peking University, Sun Yat-sen University ranked 2nd in universities in China, tied with Fudan University, Shanghai Jiao Tong University and Zhejiang University. The 15 disciplines include Chemistry, Clinical Medicine, Physics, Biology and Biochemistry, Materials Science, Molecular Biology & Genetics, Engineering, Plant and Animal Science, Environment/Ecology, Pharmacology & Toxicology, Neuroscience & Behavior, Mathematics, Microbiology, Agricultural Sciences, and Social Sciences, General.

=== Nature Publishing Index (NPI) ===
Nature Publishing Index shows both Research Articles (Articles, Letters & Brief Communications) and Reviews, published in Nature and/or Nature research journals. The rankings are based on the number of papers that were published during the last 12 months. In time range of 7 January 2013 to 30 June 2014, Sun Yat-sen University is ranked #5 among Chinese Universities.

=== Postdoctoral Research Stations ===
Sun Yat-sen University has 39 postdoctoral research stations.

=== Journals ===
Sun Yat-sen University publishes altogether 25 scholarly journals, including

- Acta Scientiarum Naturalium Universitatis Sunyatseni
- Journey of Sun Yat-sen University Social Science Edition
- Journey of Sun Yat-sen University (medical science)
- Diagnostic Imaging & Interventional Radiology (in Chinese)
- Modern Clinical Nursing (in Chinese)
- New Medicine (in Chinese)
- Chinese Journal of Nervous and Mental Diseases (in Chinese)
- Chinese Journal of Cancer
- Eye Science

== Campuses ==
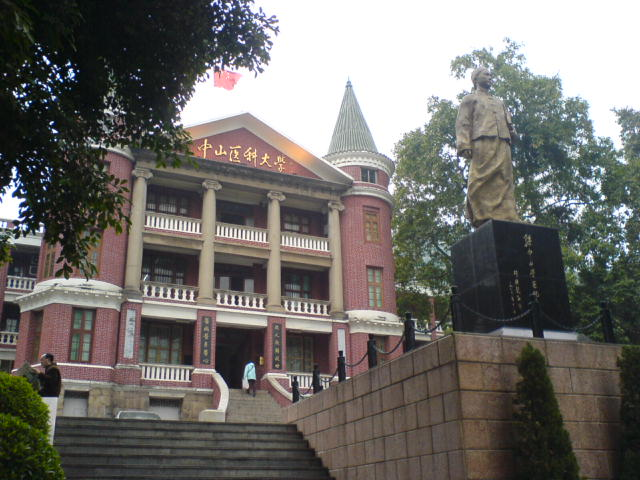
North Campus(Sun Yat-sen College of Medical Science)

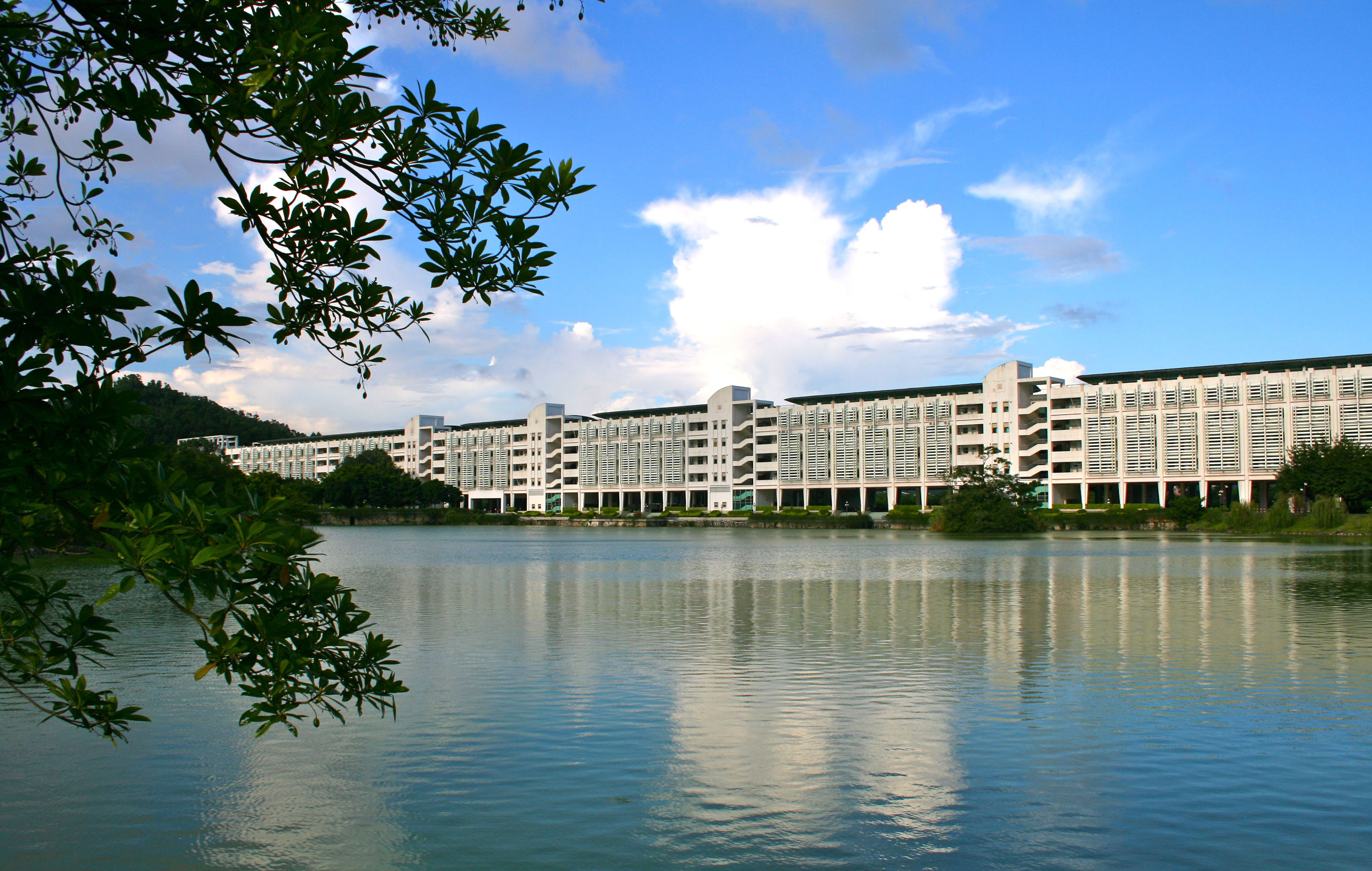
Zhuhai Campus

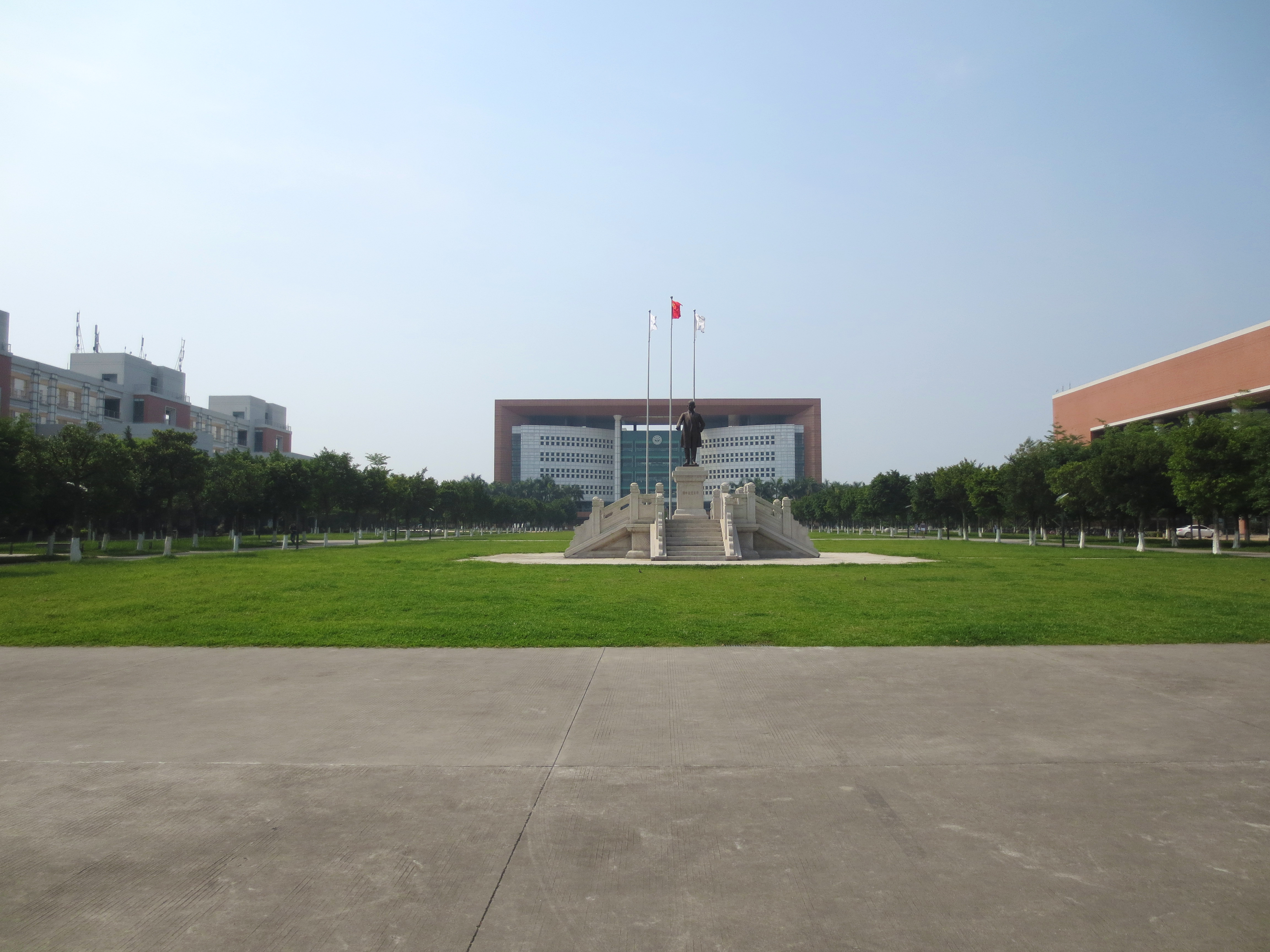
East Campus

At present, the university covers a total area of 6.17 square kilometres (2.38 sq mi), and has 5 campuses: Guangzhou South Campus (广州校区南校园) in Haizhu District, Guangzhou North Campus (广州校区北校园) in Yuexiu District, Guangzhou East Campus (广州校区东校园) in Panyu District, Zhuhai Campus (珠海校区), and Shenzhen Campus.

=== Guangzhou South Campus ===
The south campus of Sun Yat-sen University is located in Haizhu District, Guangzhou, and covers a total area of 1.17 square kilometers. It mainly hosts disciplines in sciences and humanities.

=== Guangzhou North Campus ===
The North Campus is located in Yuexiu District, Guangzhou, and covers an area of 0.39 square kilometers. It is a campus mainly for disciplines in medical sciences.

=== Guangzhou East Campus ===
The East Campus is located at the north end of the Guangzhou Higher Education Mega Center in Xiaoguwei, Panyu, and covers an area of 1.13 square kilometers. The Guangzhou University City is a major development made by the People's Government of Guangdong Province in an effort to implement the strategy of building Guangdong through science and education. The first batch of students started school there in September 2004.

=== Zhuhai Campus ===
The Zhuhai Campus is located at Tang Jia Wan, Zhuhai City, and covers an area of 3.48 square kilometers. Freshmen and sophomores of some disciplines in liberal arts, natural sciences, and medical sciences are currently living and studying on campus with students from the School of Network Education and Continuing Education.

=== Shenzhen Campus ===
The Shenzhen Campus is located at Guangming District in Shenzhen City, and covers an area of 3.217 square kilometers. Construction started in 2016 and the campus opened in September 2018.

== Alumni ==
Since 2017, at least 36 billionaires graduated from Sun Yat-sen University, putting it the first place in the South Central China region and 7th nationally.

- Sonia Chan, 2nd Secretary for Administration and Justice of Macau
- George Chann, Chinese-American painter
- Fang Fenglei, former deputy director of China International Capital Corporation and Chairman of Goldman Sachs China
- Li Fanghua, physicist
- Shiu-Ying Hu, botanist
- Huang Huahua, former Governor of Guangdong
- Muzi Mei, blogger
- Xu Ningsheng, 21st President of Fudan University
- Xu Ze, politician
- Xu Yinchuan, former world xiangqi (Chinese chess) champion
- Shou-Wu Zhang, Chinese-American mathematician
- Yingying Zhang, researcher on photosynthesis and crop productivity
- Zhang Huaicun, artist and writer of children's books
- Guotai Zhou, major general of the People's Liberation Army
- Ye Shuhua, prominent astronomer
- Tsang Hin-chi, entrepreneur and politician, founder of the Goldlion Group
- Lai Minhua, Director General of Macao Customs Service
- Susana Wong Soi Man, Director of the Marine and Water Bureau of Macau

== See also ==
- Sun Yat-sen University (disambiguation)
  - National Sun Yat-sen University in Taiwan, Republic of China
  - Moscow Sun Yat-sen University in Moscow, Russia
- Lingnan College (in Chinese)
- US-China University Presidents Roundtable
