= Changjiang Scholars Program =

Chinese academic award

The Changjiang (Yangtze River) Scholar award (Chinese: 长江学者奖励计划; pinyin: Chángjiāng Xuézhě Jiǎnglì Jìhuà) is the highest academic award issued to an individual in higher education by the Ministry of Education of the People's Republic of China. It is also known as the Cheung Kong Scholar and the Yangtze River Scholar award.

== History ==
The initial funding for this program was provided by the Hong Kong–based Li Ka Shing Foundation (李嘉诚基金会), with the goal of elevating research at Chinese universities to the highest levels internationally. The program began in August 1998.

The program has enabled Chinese universities to provide international recognition to leading academics, but has led to difficulties for less prestigious universities in China. Individuals who receive the Changjiang (Yangtze River) Scholar award have become targets for recruitment by competing Chinese universities so frequently that the Ministry of Education issued a notice in 2013 barring universities from hiring away Changjiang professors, and another in 2017 discouraging Chinese universities from recruiting away top faculty from one another.

== Selection ==
The Changjiang Scholars Program mainly recognizes China's domestic top scholars, who receive the prestigious title of Changjiang Distinguished Professor at their own Chinese universities and are provided with some research resources to enhance the recipients' research programs. This is in contrast to the Thousand Talents Plan, which recruits top experts from overseas and is administered separately and directly by the central government.

Although the award is rarely granted to foreign scientists, a few renowned international scholars are chosen each year. These internationally renowned scholars include Nobel Prize Laureates and members of US National Academy of Engineering. They are typically honored with a guest or visiting professorship at a major university, with the prestigious title of Changjiang Scholar. These world-class visiting professorships help significantly raise their host universities' international visibility.

Although these professorships can be affiliated with any university in China, they are awarded disproportionately to individuals affiliated with the most prestigious (C9 League) universities.
