= Ying'en Bridge =

Ying'en Bridge 迎恩桥
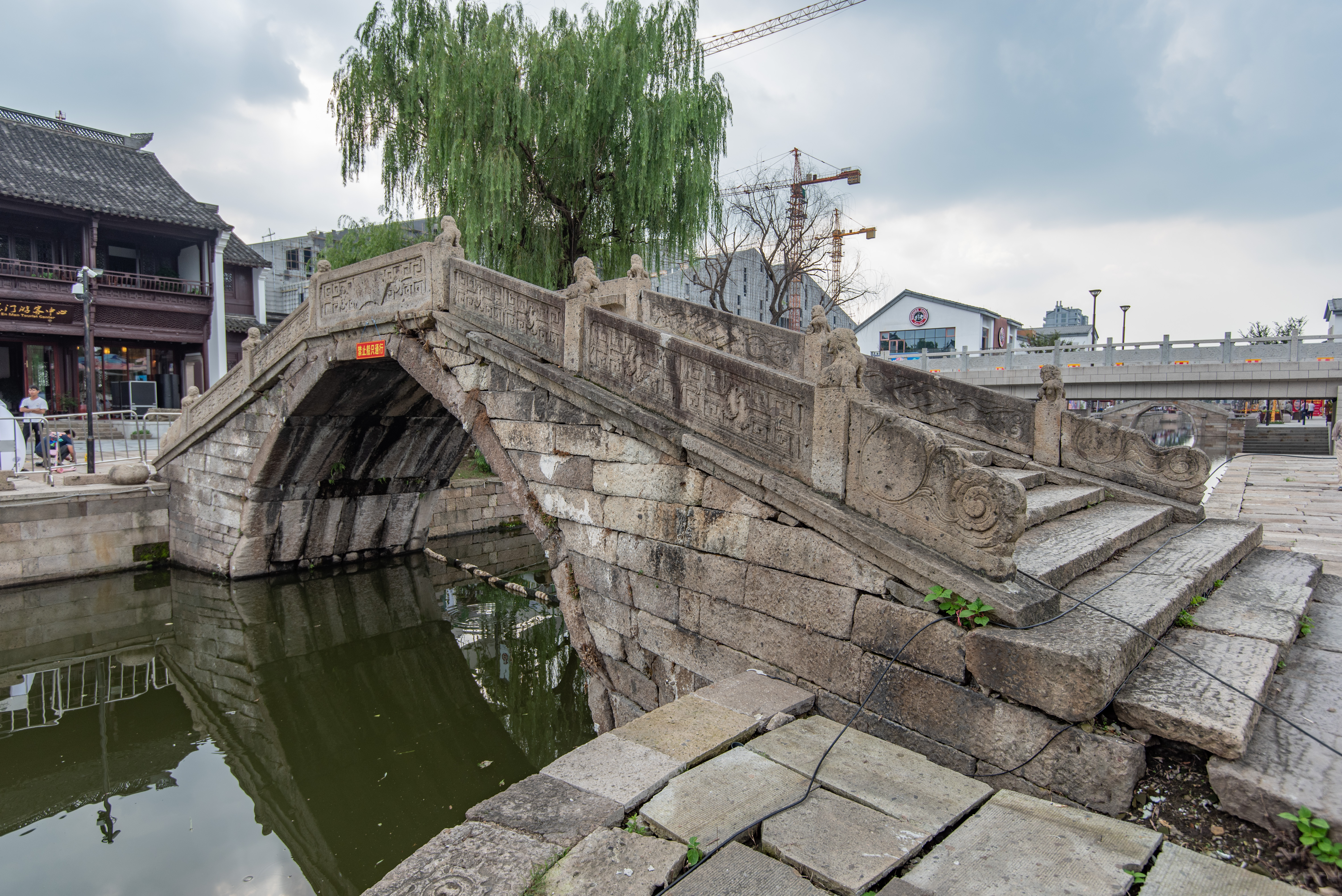
- Ying'en Bridge in September 2020
- Coordinates: 30°01′12″N 120°34′29″E
- Carries: Pedestrians and bicycles
- Crosses: Grand Canal
- Locale: Yuecheng District, Shaoxing, Zhejiang, China

Characteristics
- Design: Arch bridge
- Material: Stone
- Total length: 19 metres (62 ft)
- Width: 2.7 metres (8 ft 10 in)
- Height: 3.7 metres (12 ft)
- Longest span: 9.3 metres (31 ft)

History
- Rebuilt: 1626

Location
- Interactive map of Ying'en Bridge

The Ying'en Bridge (simplified Chinese: 迎恩桥; traditional Chinese: 迎恩橋; pinyin: Yíng'ēn Qiáo), also known as Caishi Bridge (菜市桥; 菜市橋; Càishì Qiáo; 'Vegetable Market Bridge'), is a historic stone arch bridge over the Grand Canal in Yuecheng District, Shaoxing, Zhejiang, China.

== History ==
The bridge was built in an unknown age and rebuilt in 1626 during the Tianqi era of the Ming dynasty (1368–1644). The bridge measures 19 metres (62 ft) long, 2.7 metres (8 ft 10 in) wide, and approximately 3.7 metres (12 ft) high. There are 12 stone posts supporting the railings, at the top of the railing posts stand carved 12 stone lions in different moods and postures.

In May 2013, it was listed among the seventh batch of "Major National Historical and Cultural Sites in Zhejiang" by the State Council of China.

== Gallery ==
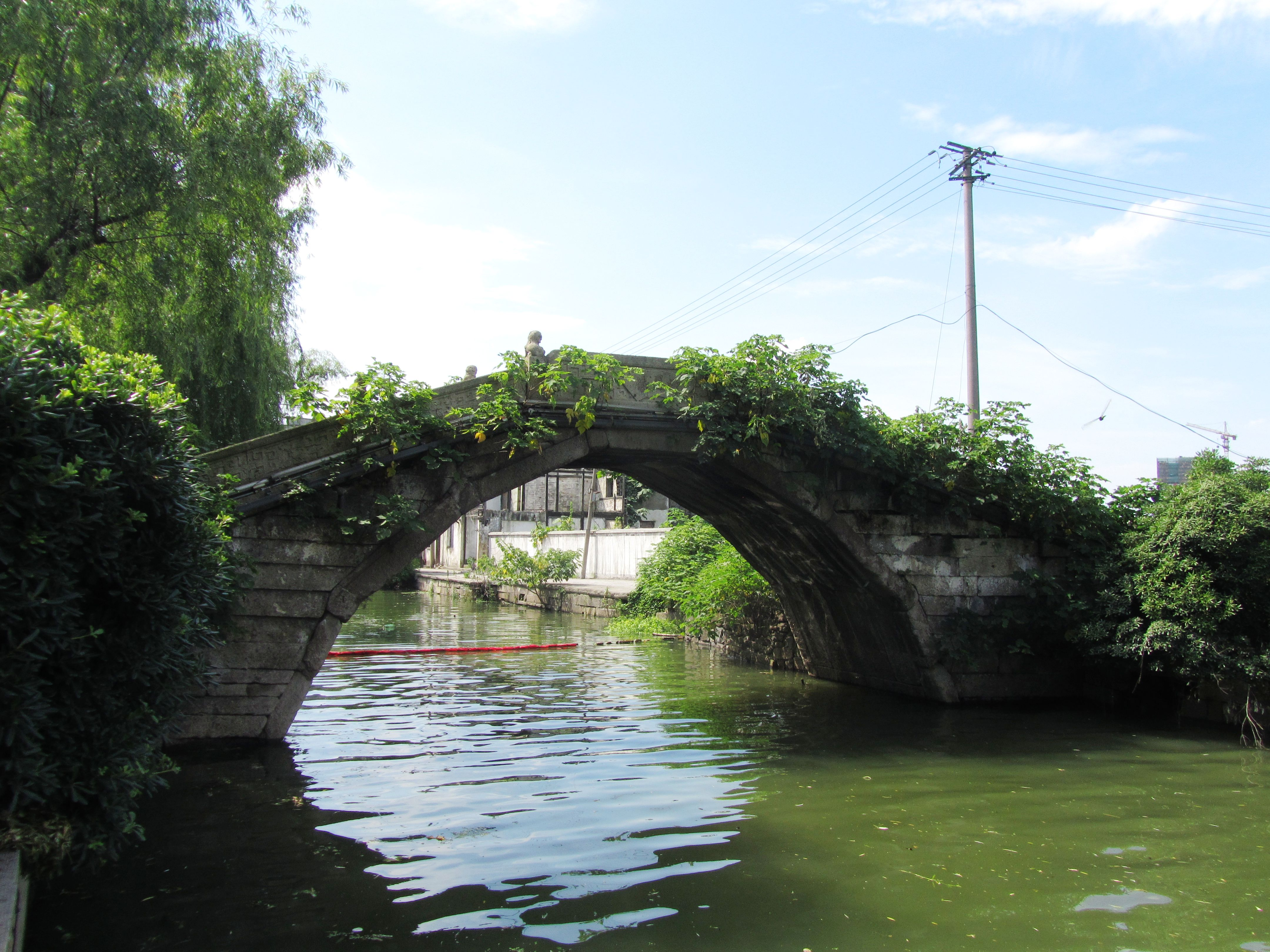
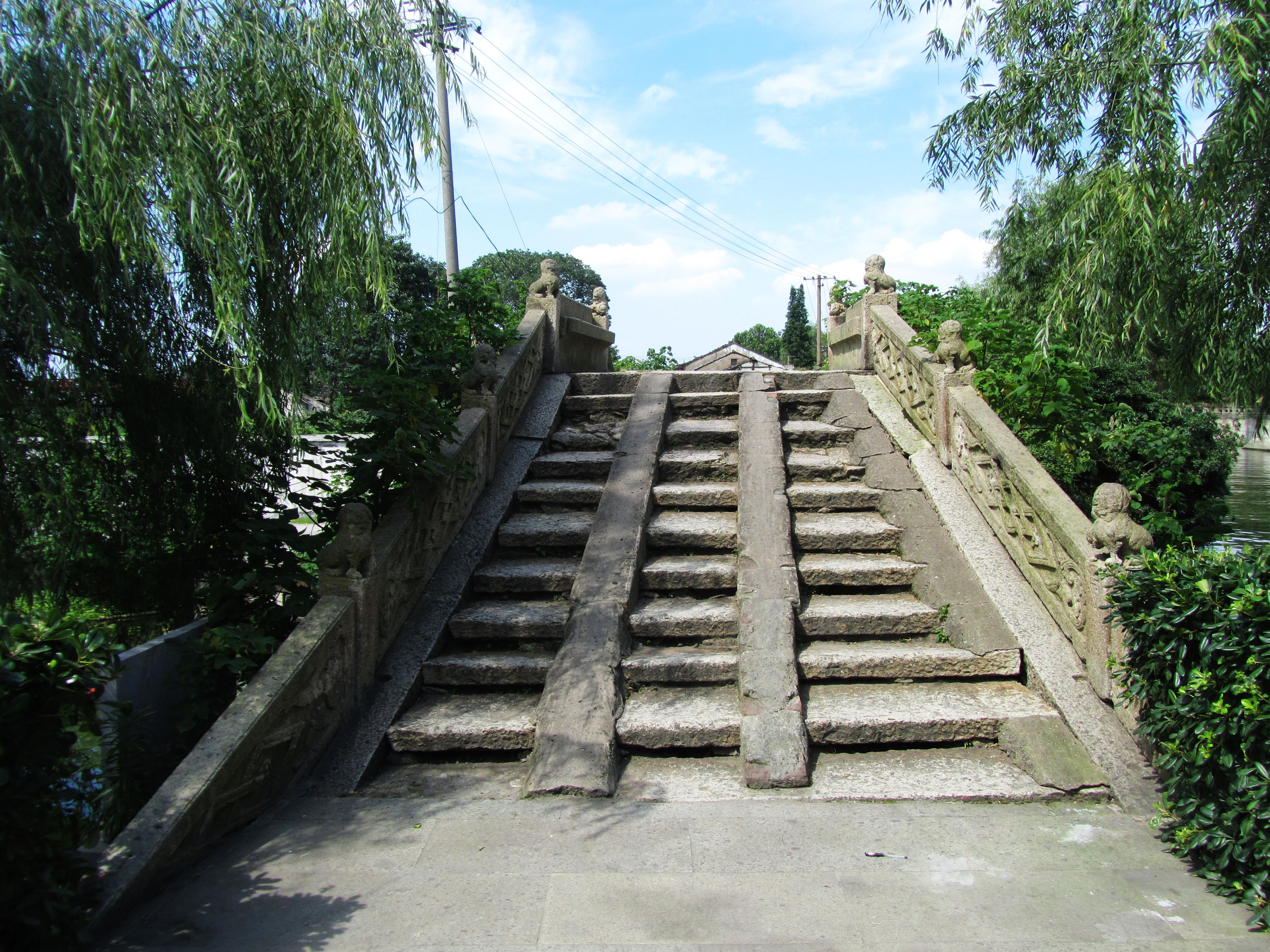
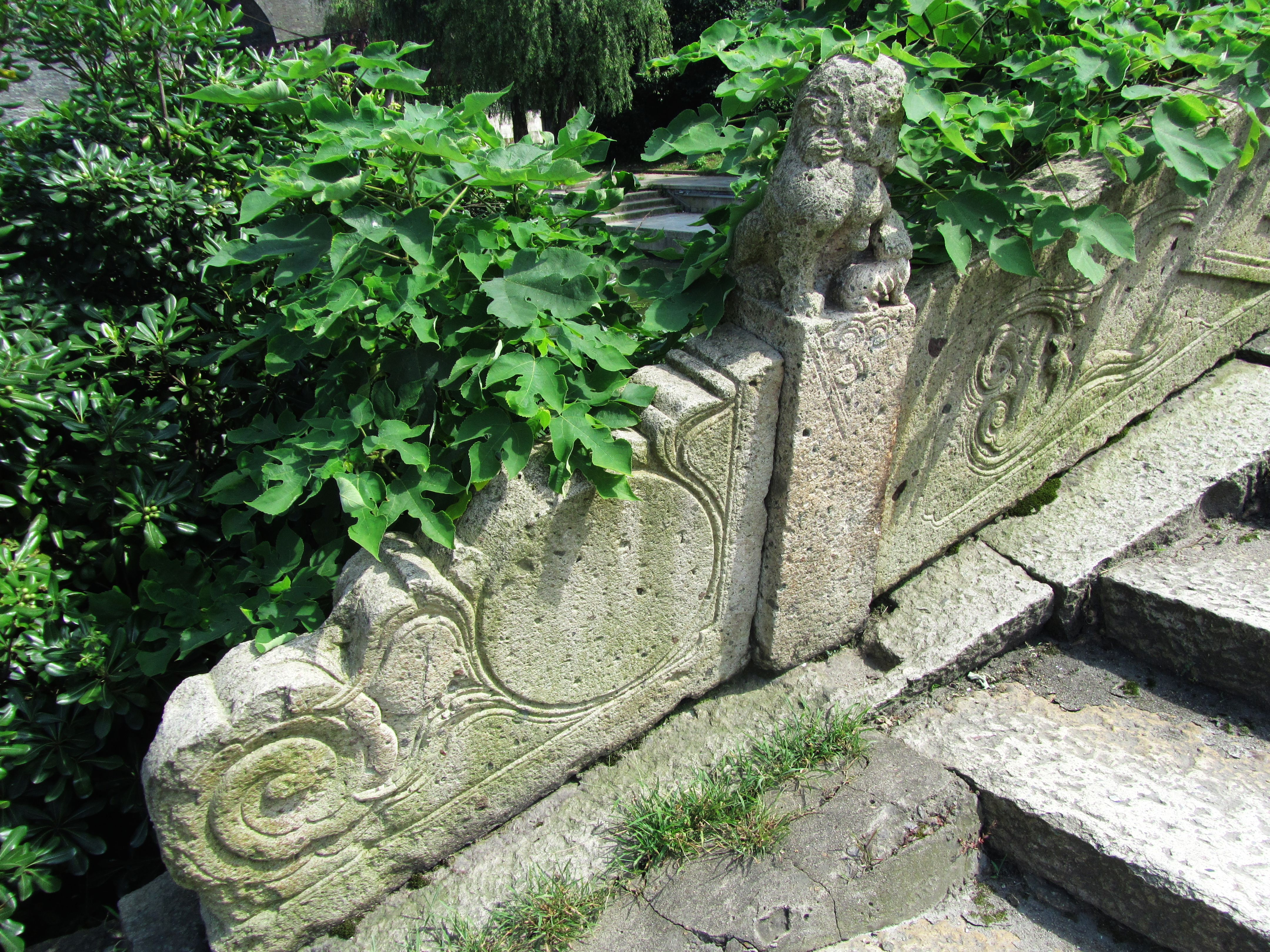
