= Guangxiang Bridge =

Guangxiang Bridge 光相桥
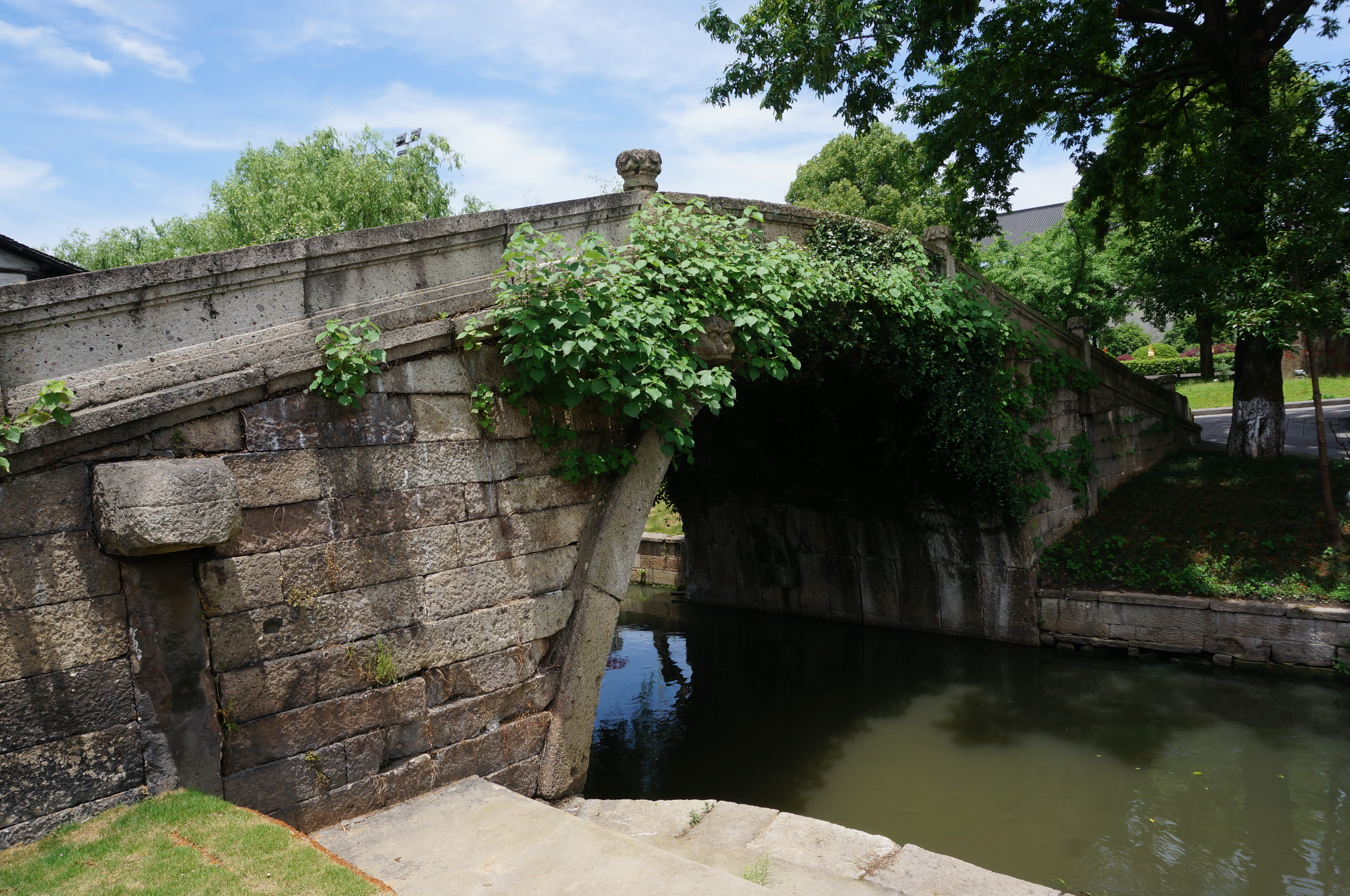
- Guangxiang Bridge in May 2017
- Coordinates: 30°01′01″N 120°34′49″E
- Carries: Pedestrians and bicycles
- Crosses: Old City River
- Locale: Yuecheng District of Shaoxing, Zhejiang, China

Characteristics
- Design: Arch bridge
- Material: Stone
- Total length: 30.8 metres (101 ft)
- Width: 4.9 metres (16 ft)
- Height: 5.5 metres (18 ft)

History
- Rebuilt: 1982

The Guangxiang Bridge (simplified Chinese: 光相桥; traditional Chinese: 光相橋; pinyin: Guāngxiàng Qiáo) is a historic stone arch bridge over the Old City River in Yuecheng District of Shaoxing, Zhejiang, China.

== Etymology ==
Guangxiang Bridge is named after Guangxiang Temple (光相寺) near the bridge.

== History ==
Guangxiang Bridge was originally built in the Eastern Jin (317–420), but because of war and natural disasters has been rebuilt numerous times since then. The present version was completed in 1982.

On 6 May 2013, it was listed among the seventh batch of "Major National Historical and Cultural Sites in Zhejiang" by the State Council of China.

== Gallery ==
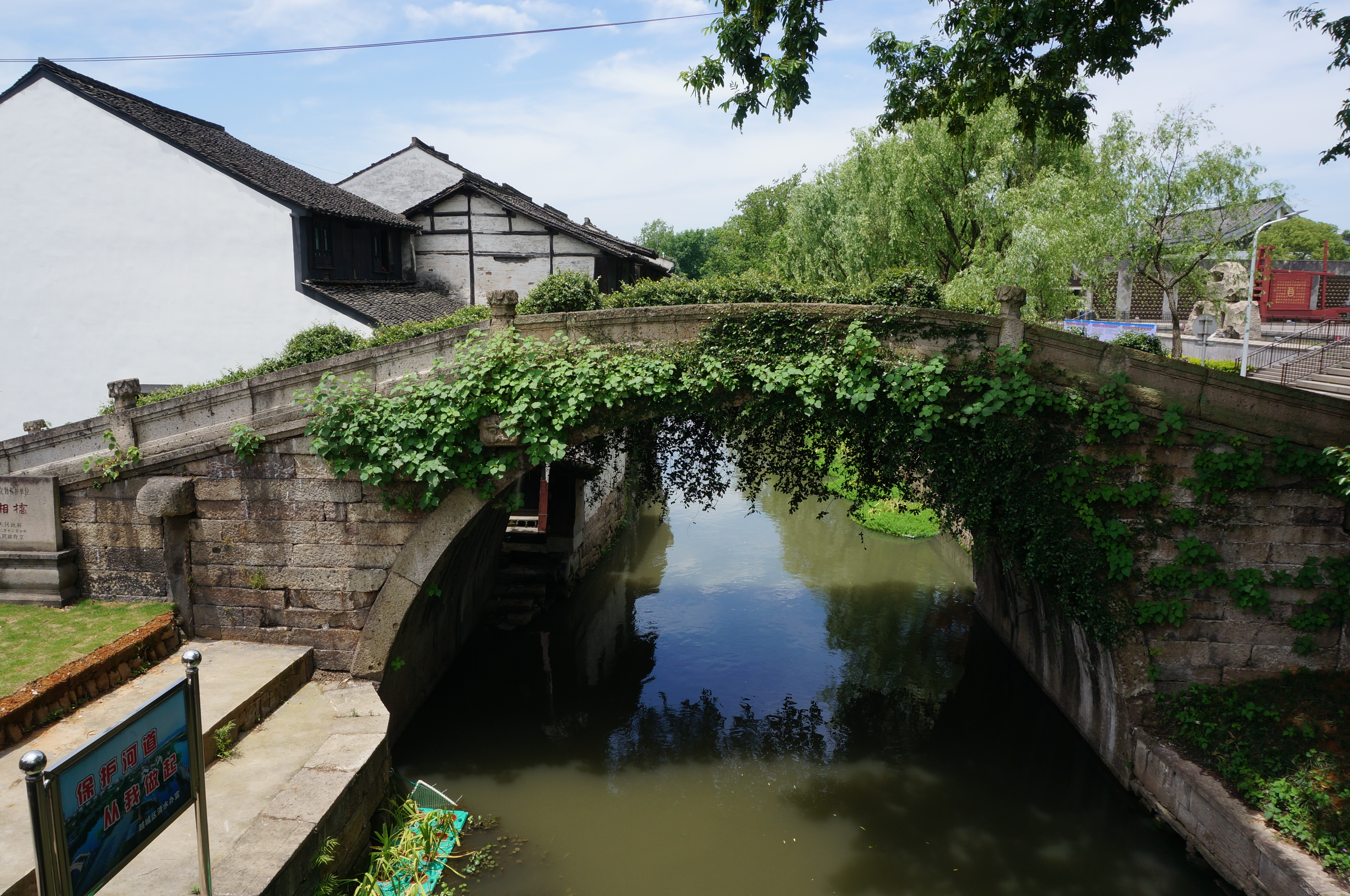
Guangxiang Bridge in May 2017

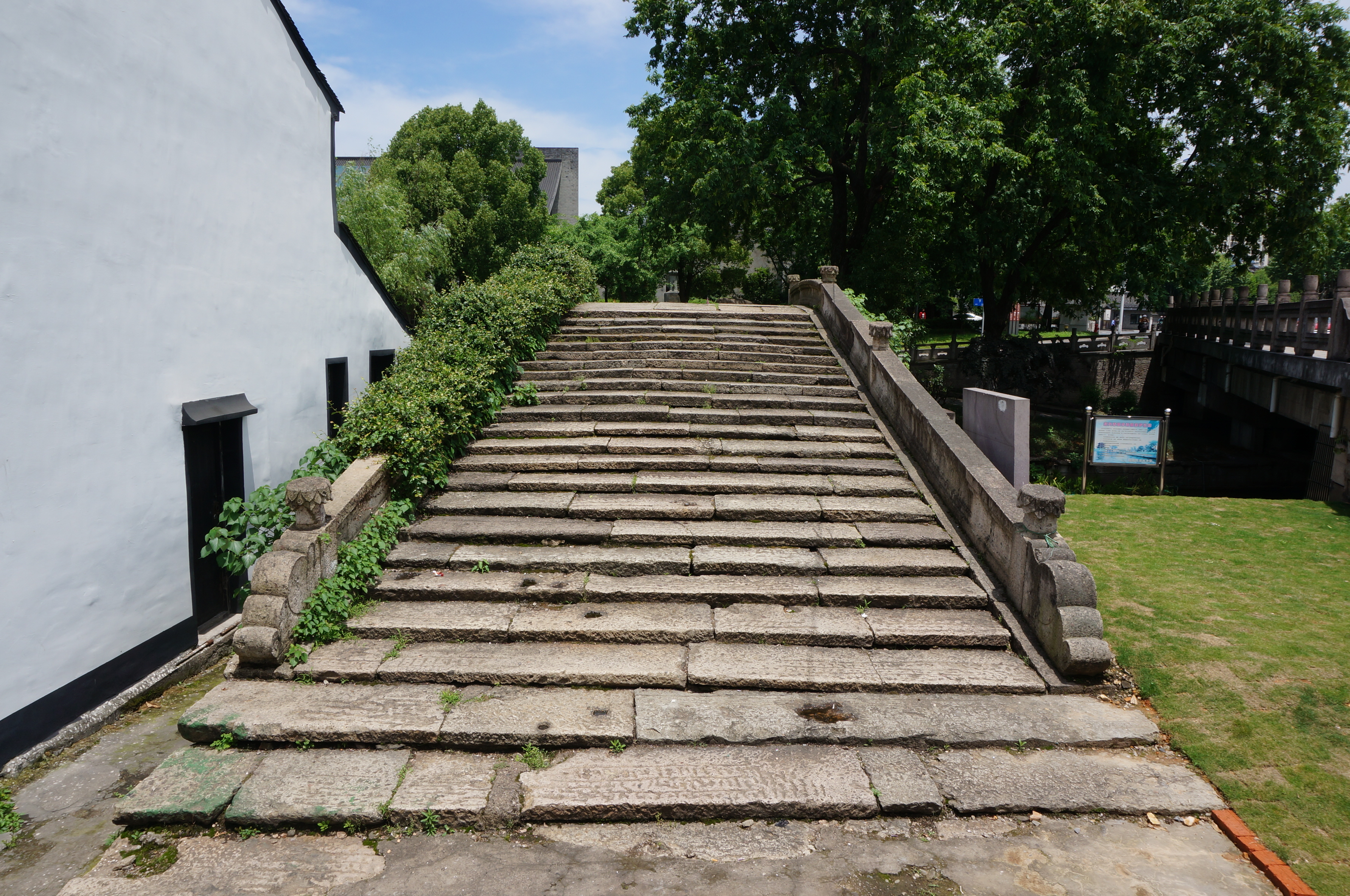
Guangxiang Bridge in May 2017

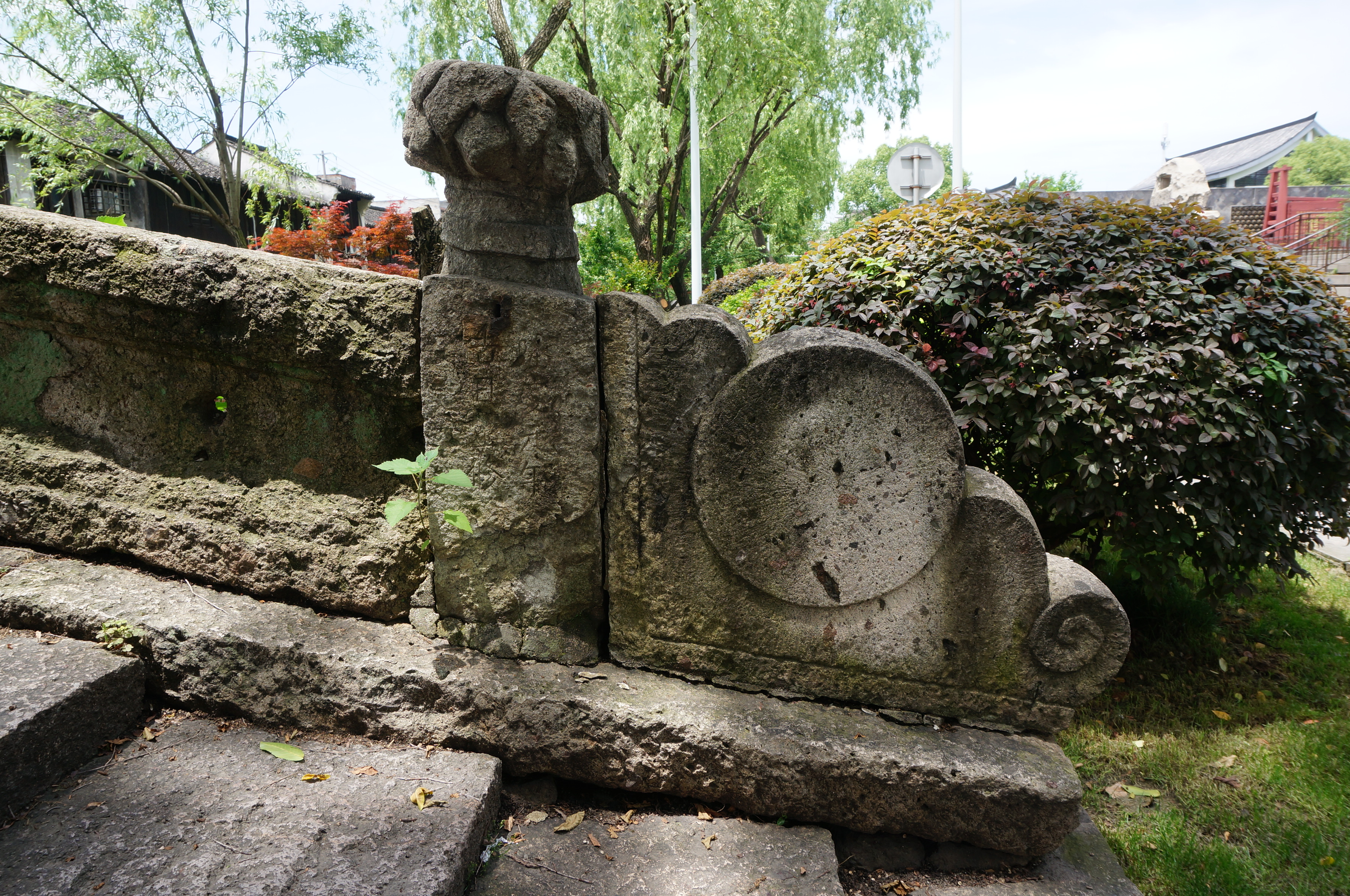
Drum-shaped bearing stone

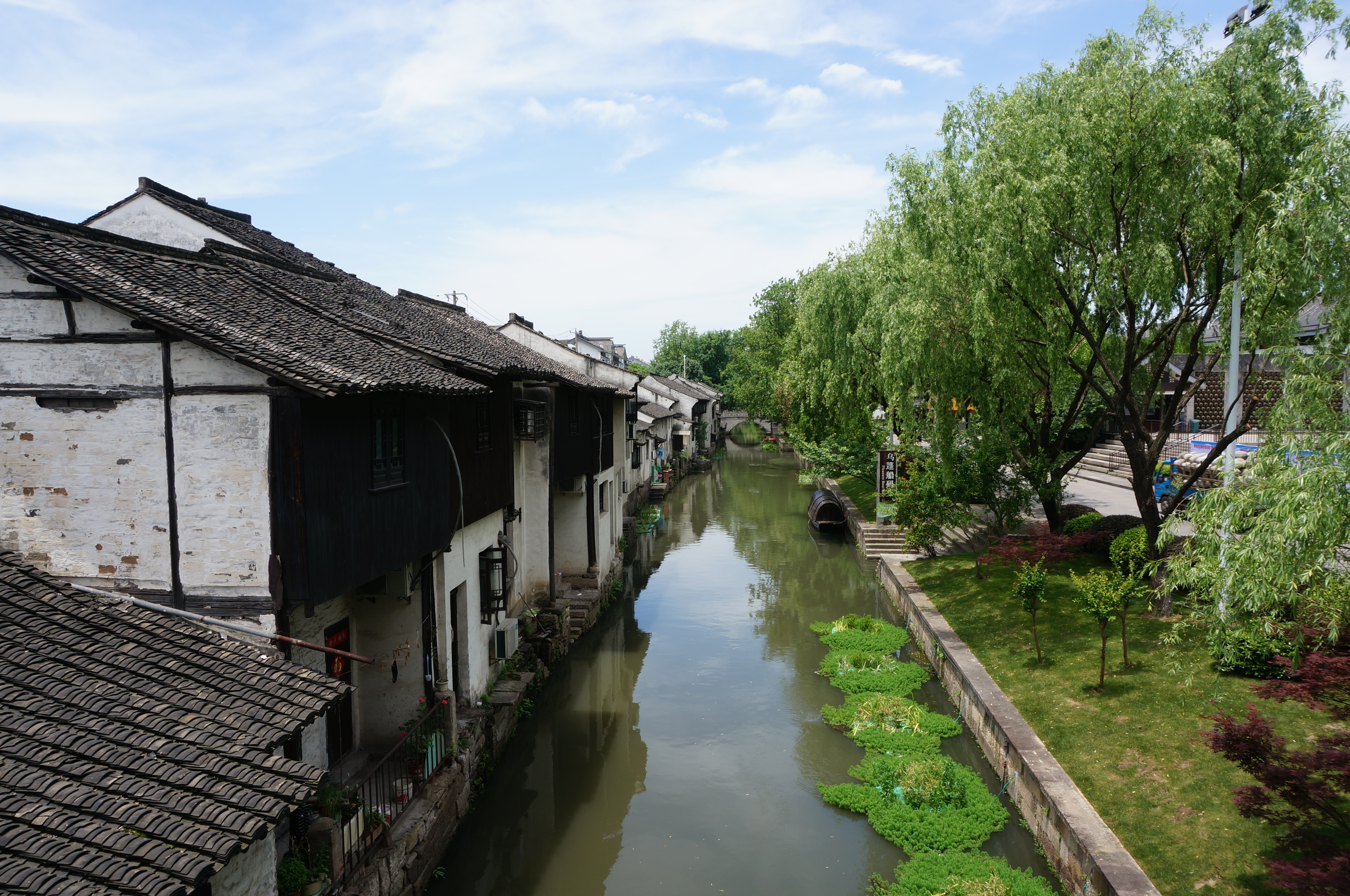
Guangxiang Bridge in May 2017
