= Xiegong Bridge =

Xiegong Bridge 谢公桥
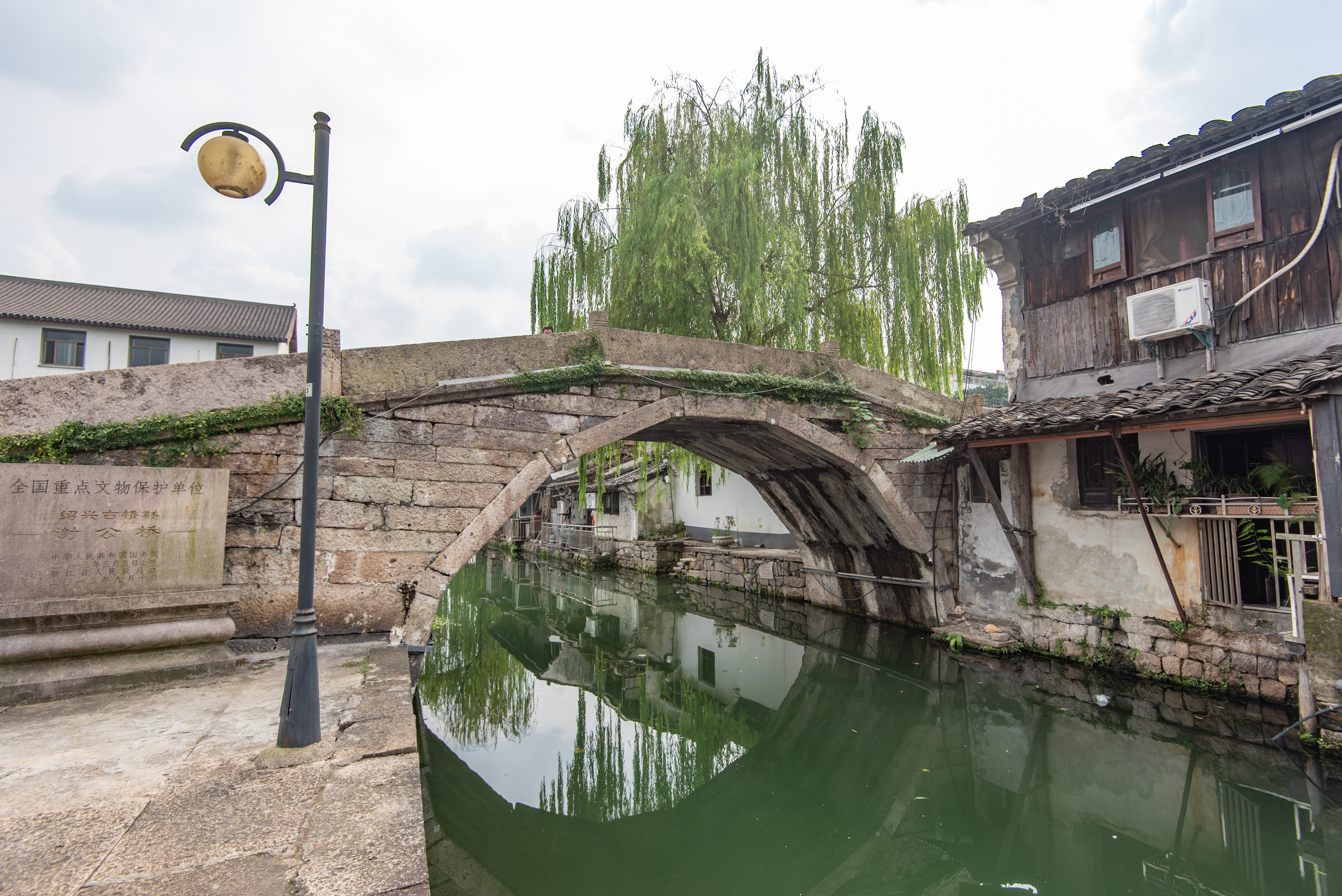
- Xiegong Bridge in September 2020
- Coordinates: 30°00′49″N 120°34′49″E
- Carries: Pedestrians and bicycles
- Crosses: West Stream
- Locale: Yuecheng District of Shaoxing, Zhejiang, China

Characteristics
- Design: Arch bridge
- Material: Stone
- Total length: 30.60 metres (100.4 ft)
- Width: 2.95 metres (9 ft 8 in)
- Height: 4.65 metres (15.3 ft)

History
- Rebuilt: 1685

Location
- Interactive map of Xiegong Bridge

The Xiegong Bridge (simplified Chinese: 谢公桥; traditional Chinese: 謝公橋; pinyin: Xiègōng Qiáo) is a historic stone arch bridge over the West Stream in Yuecheng District of Shaoxing, Zhejiang, China.

== Etymology ==
Xiegong Bridge is named after Xie Gong (谢公), a prefecture chief during the Later Jin dynasty (936–947).

== History ==
The original bridge dates back to the Later Jin dynasty (936–947). The present version was completed in 1685, during the ruling of Kangxi Emperor of the Qing dynasty (1644–1911).

On 6 May 2013, it was listed among the seventh batch of "Major National Historical and Cultural Sites in Zhejiang" by the State Council of China.

== Gallery ==
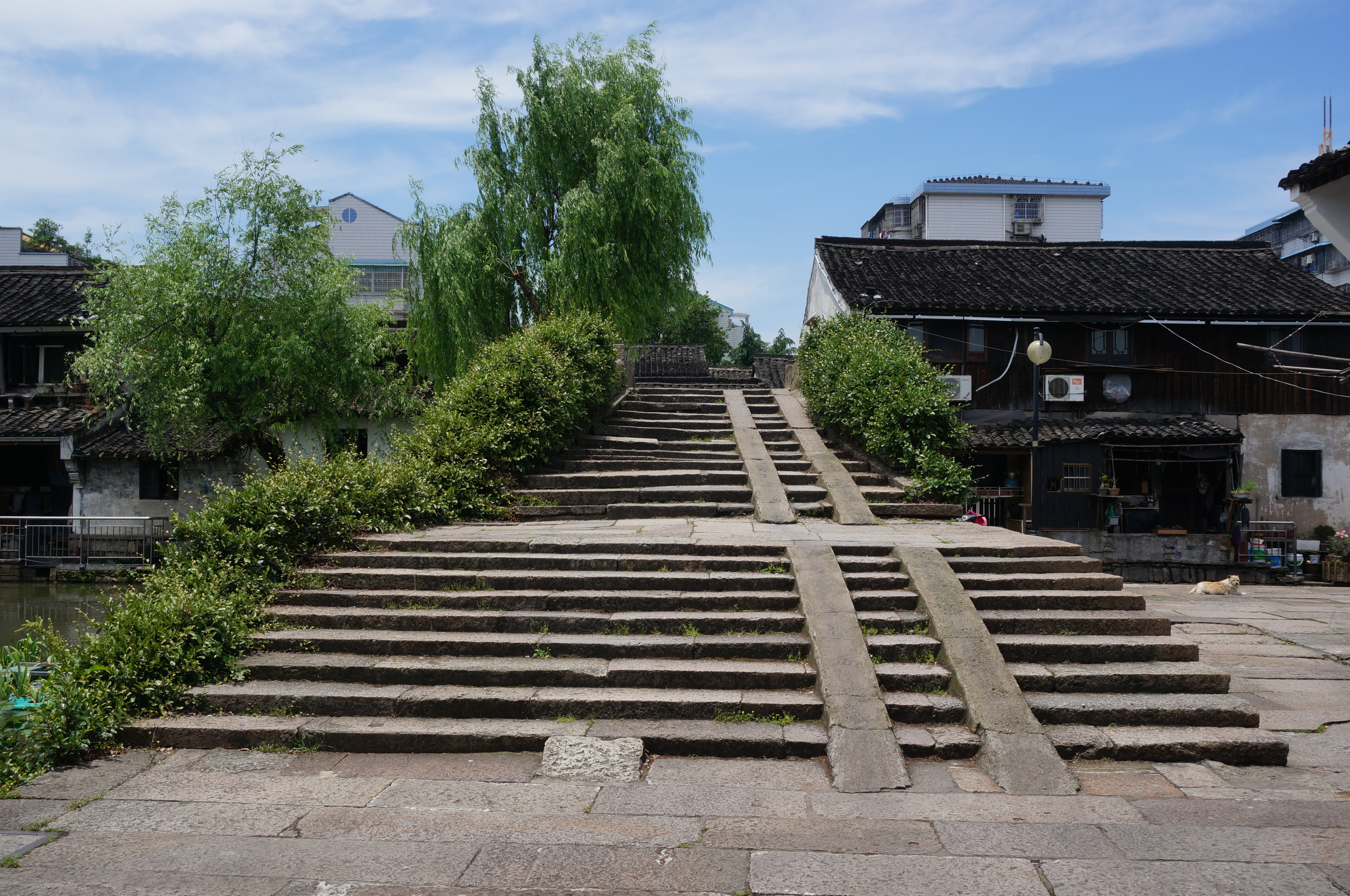
Xiegong Bridge

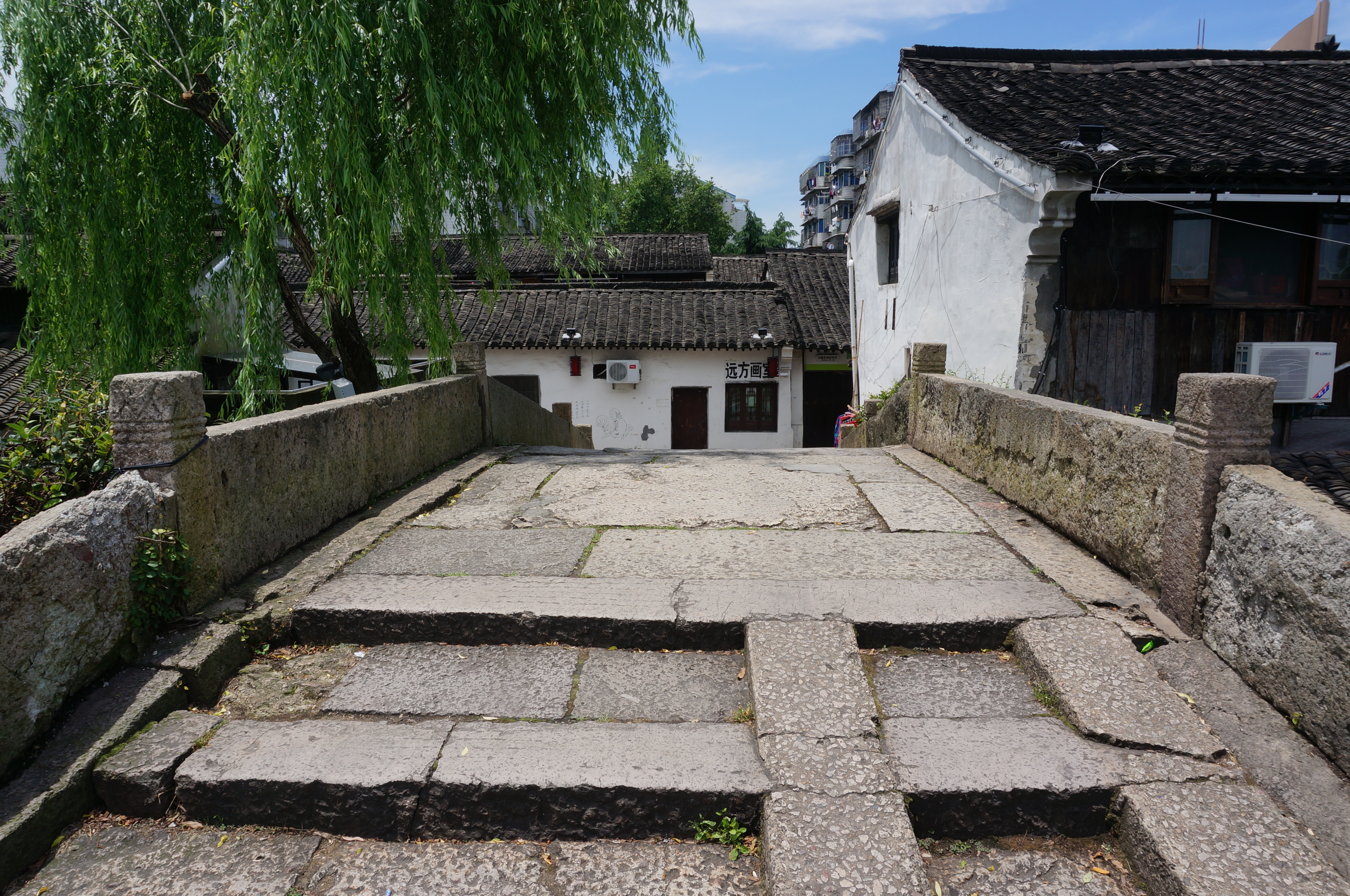
Xiegong Bridge

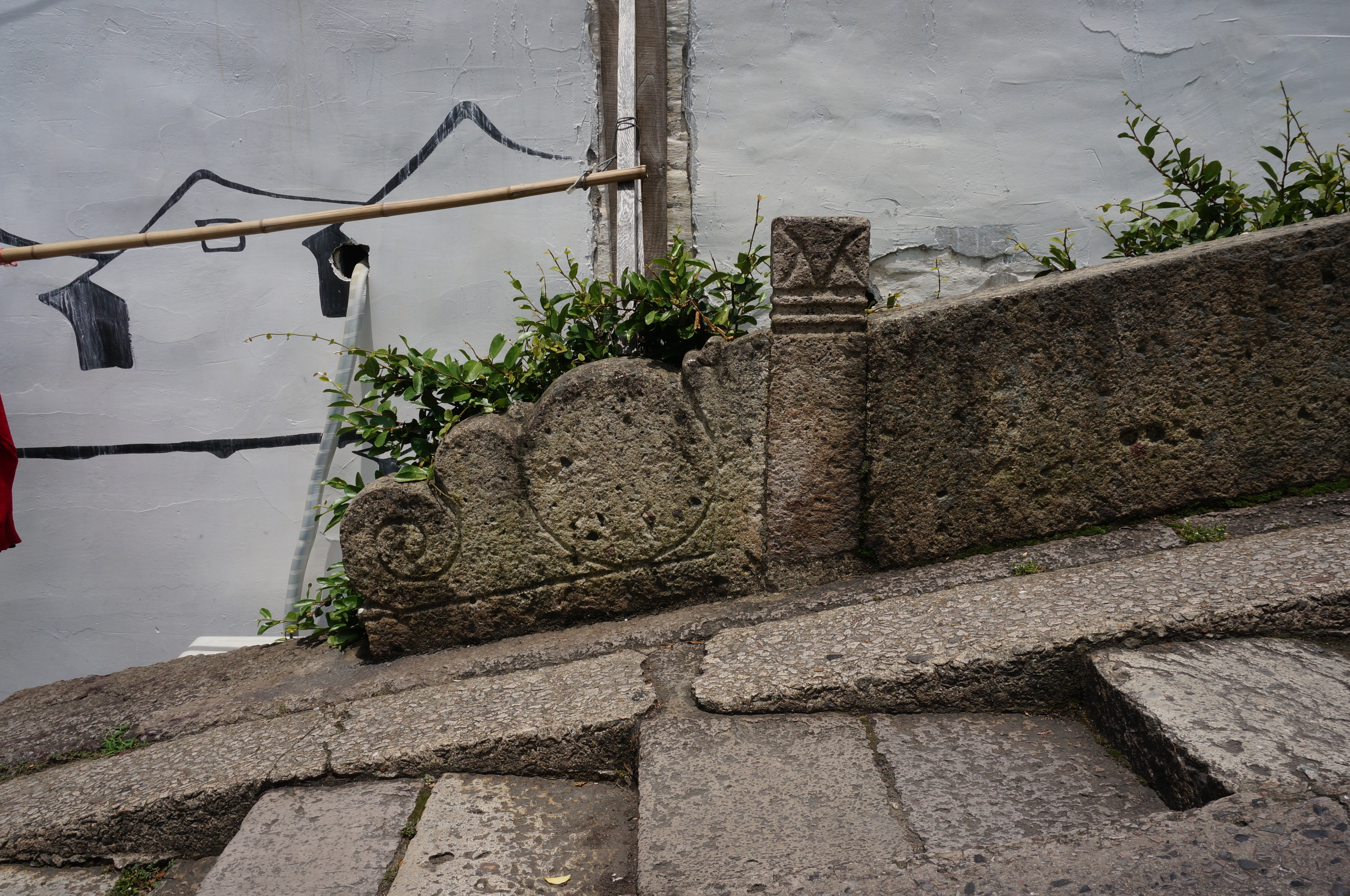
Railings and drum-shaped bearing stone

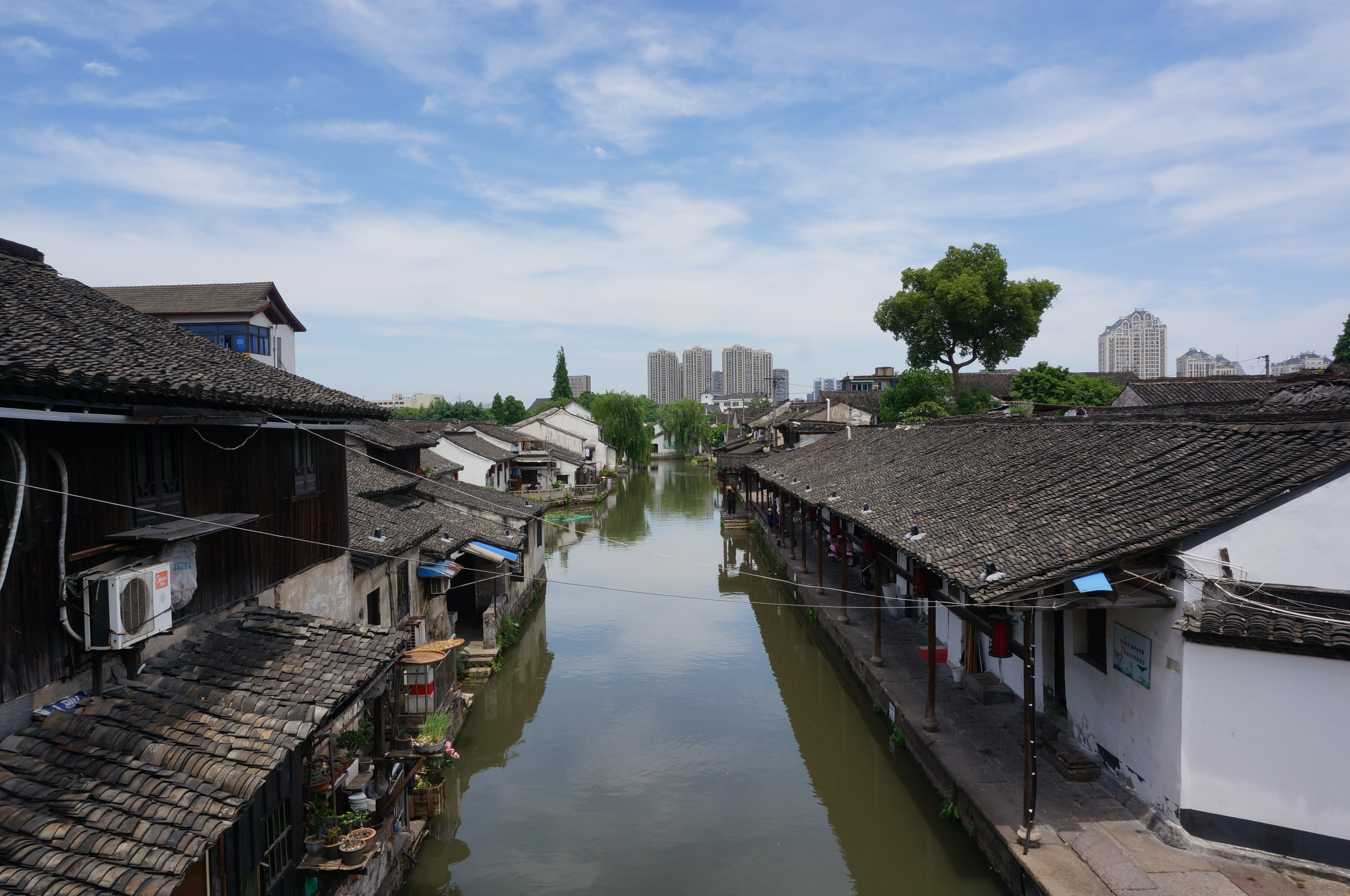
Mansion of Lü Ben near the bridge

== Surrounding area ==
- Mansion of Lü Ben, head of the cabinet of the Ming Empire (1368–1644).
