= Tishan Bridge =

Tishan Bridge 题扇桥
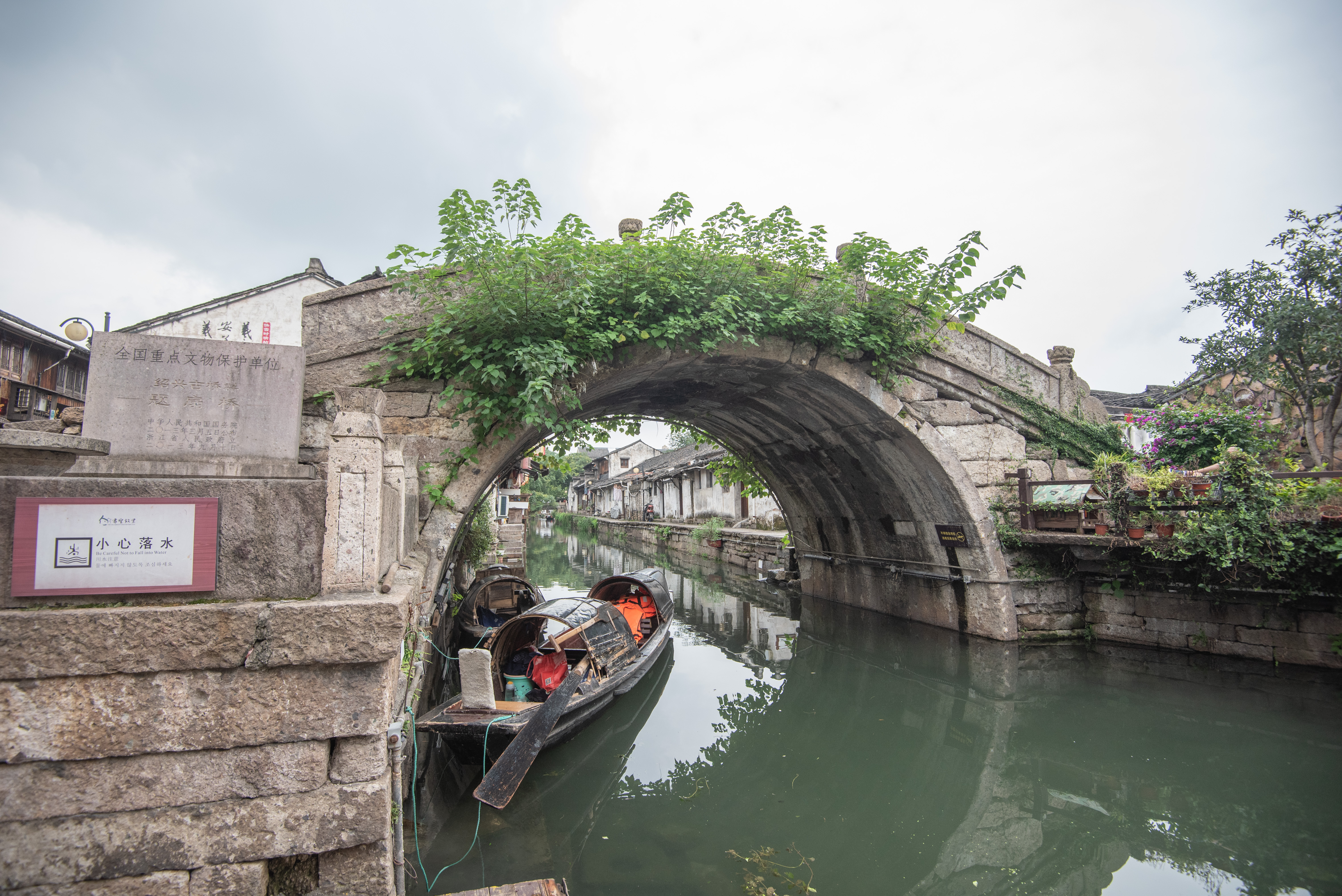
- Tishan Bridge in September 2020
- Coordinates: 30°00′45″N 120°35′34″E
- Carries: Pedestrians
- Crosses: A stream
- Locale: Yuecheng District of Shaoxing, Zhejiang, China

Characteristics
- Design: Arch bridge
- Material: Stone
- Total length: 3.8 metres (12 ft)
- Width: 4.3 metres (14 ft)

History
- Rebuilt: 1828

Location
- Interactive map of Tishan Bridge

The Tishan Bridge (simplified Chinese: 题扇桥; traditional Chinese: 題扇橋; pinyin: Tíshàn Qiáo) is a historic stone arch bridge over a stream in Yuecheng District of Shaoxing, Zhejiang, China. The bridge is 3.8 metres (12 ft) long and 4.3 metres (14 ft) wide.

== Etymology ==
Tishan Bridge is named after the calligrapher Wang Xizhi of the Eastern Jin dynasty (266–420 CE) who wrote an inscription on an old woman's fan here.

== History ==
The original bridge dates back to the Eastern Jin dynasty (266–420). The current structure was rebuilt in 1828, during the reign of Daoguang Emperor of the Qing dynasty (1644–1911).

On 6 May 2013, it was listed among the seventh batch of "Major National Historical and Cultural Sites in Zhejiang" by the State Council of China.

== Gallery ==
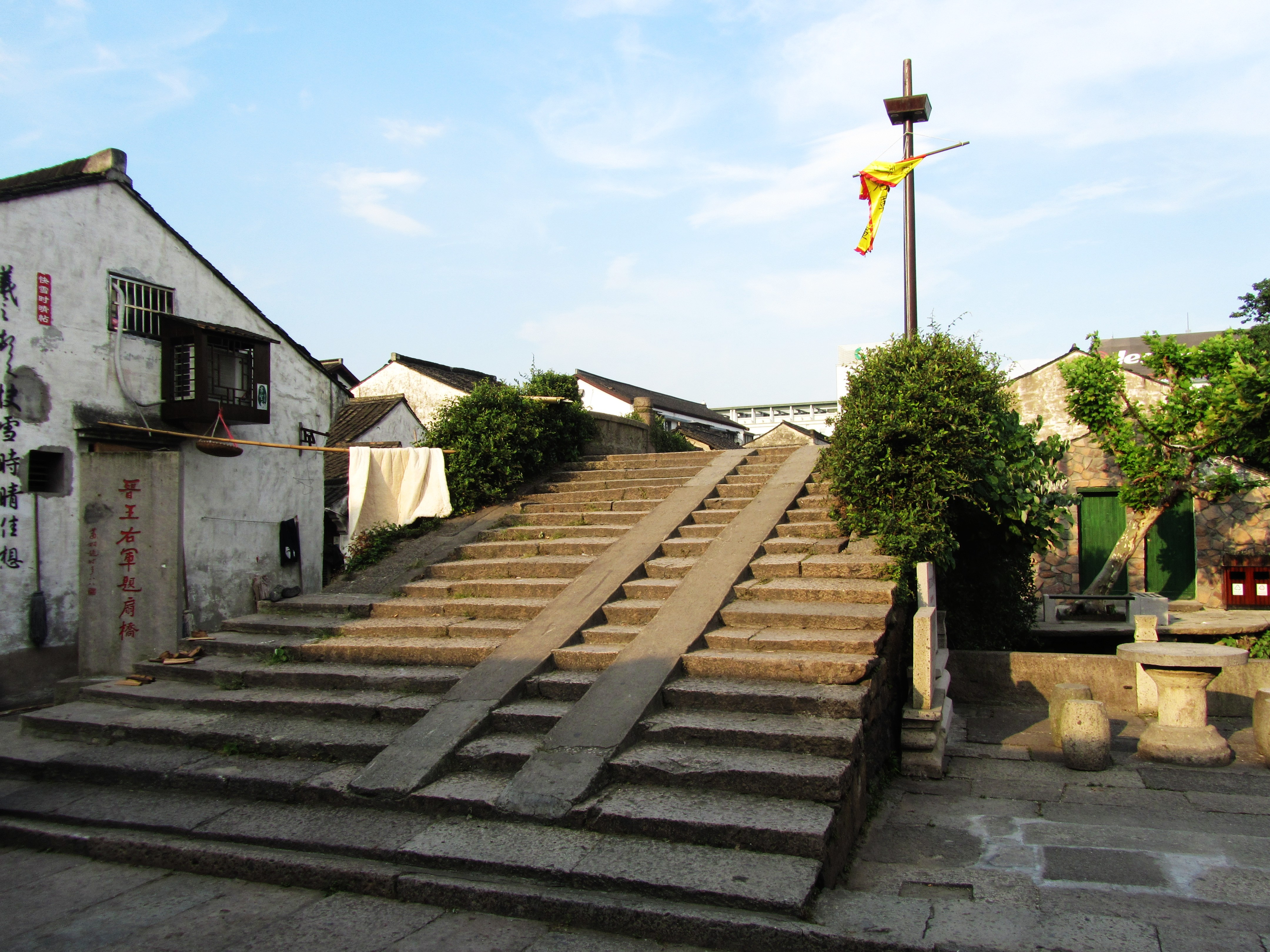
Tishan Bridge in July 2012

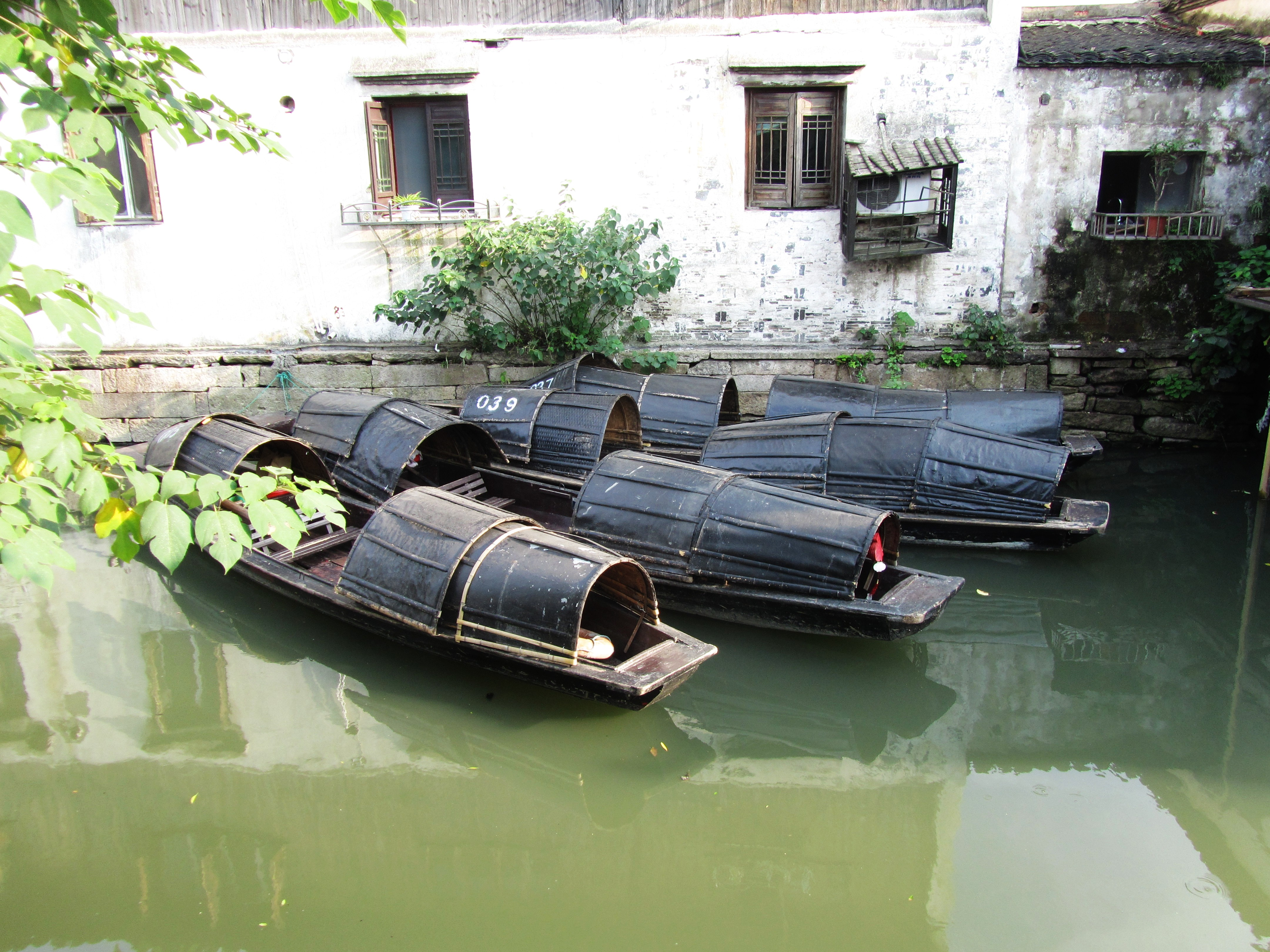
Wupeng boat under the bridge

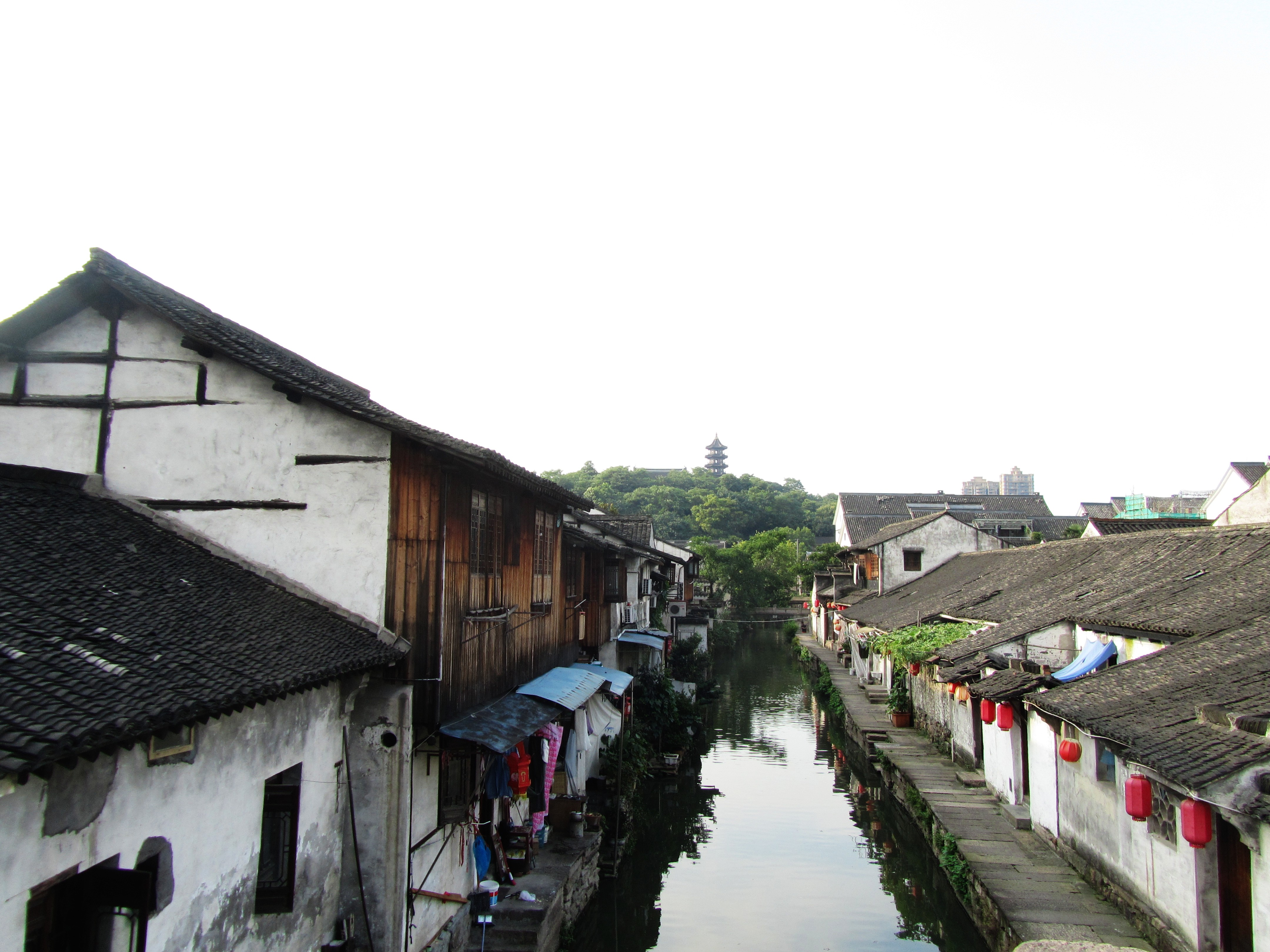
Buildings on both sides of the bridge
