= Baiwang Bridge =

Baiwang Bridge 拜王桥
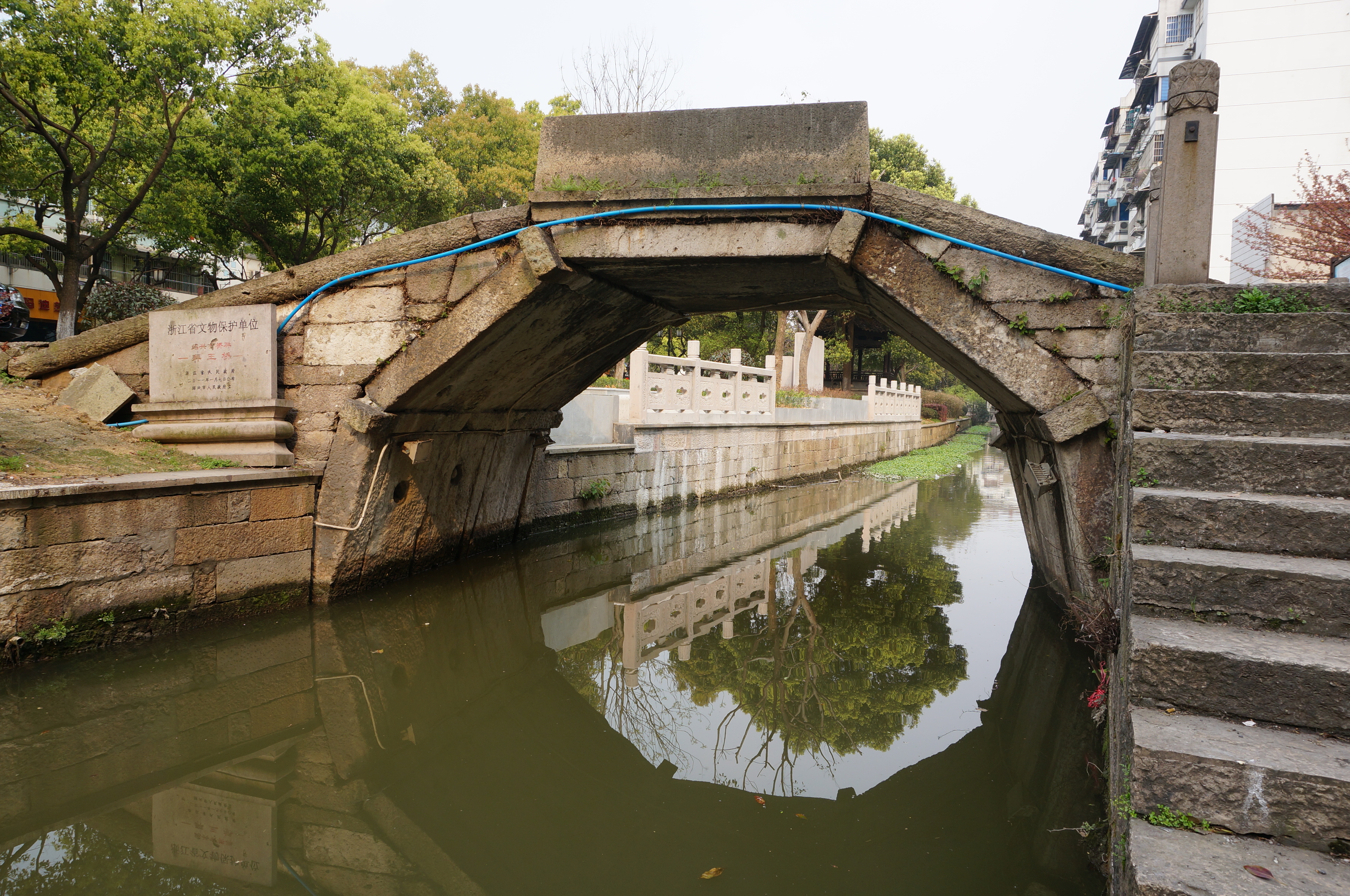
- Baiwang Bridge in March 2016
- Coordinates: 29°59′57″N 120°34′54″E
- Carries: Pedestrians
- Locale: Yuecheng District of Shaoxing, Zhejiang, China

Characteristics
- Design: Arch bridge
- Material: Stone
- Total length: 16.3 metres (53 ft)
- Width: 3.22 metres (10.6 ft)
- Height: 3.5 metres (11 ft)

History
- Rebuilt: 1689

Location
- Interactive map of Baiwang Bridge

The Baiwang Bridge (simplified Chinese: 拜王桥; traditional Chinese: 拜王橋; pinyin: Bàiwáng Qiáo) is a historic stone arch bridge over a stream in Yuecheng District of Shaoxing, Zhejiang, China.

== History ==
The original bridge dates back to the Tang dynasty (618–907), but because of war and natural disasters has been rebuilt numerous times since then. The present version was completed in 1689, during the reign of Kangxi Emperor of the Qing dynasty (1644–1911).

On 6 May 2013, it was listed among the seventh batch of "Major National Historical and Cultural Sites in Zhejiang" by the State Council of China.

== Gallery ==
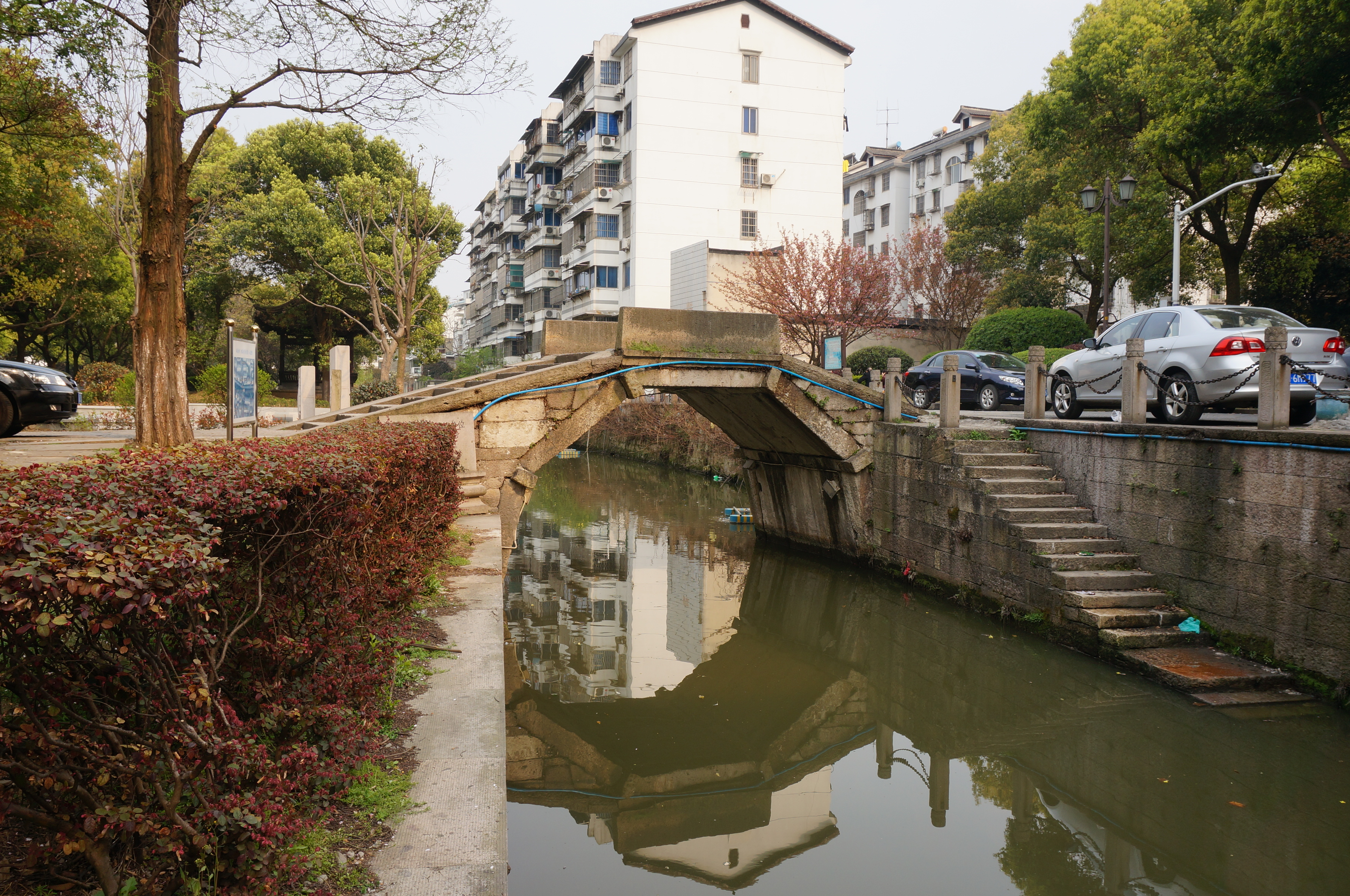
Baiwang Bridge in March 2016

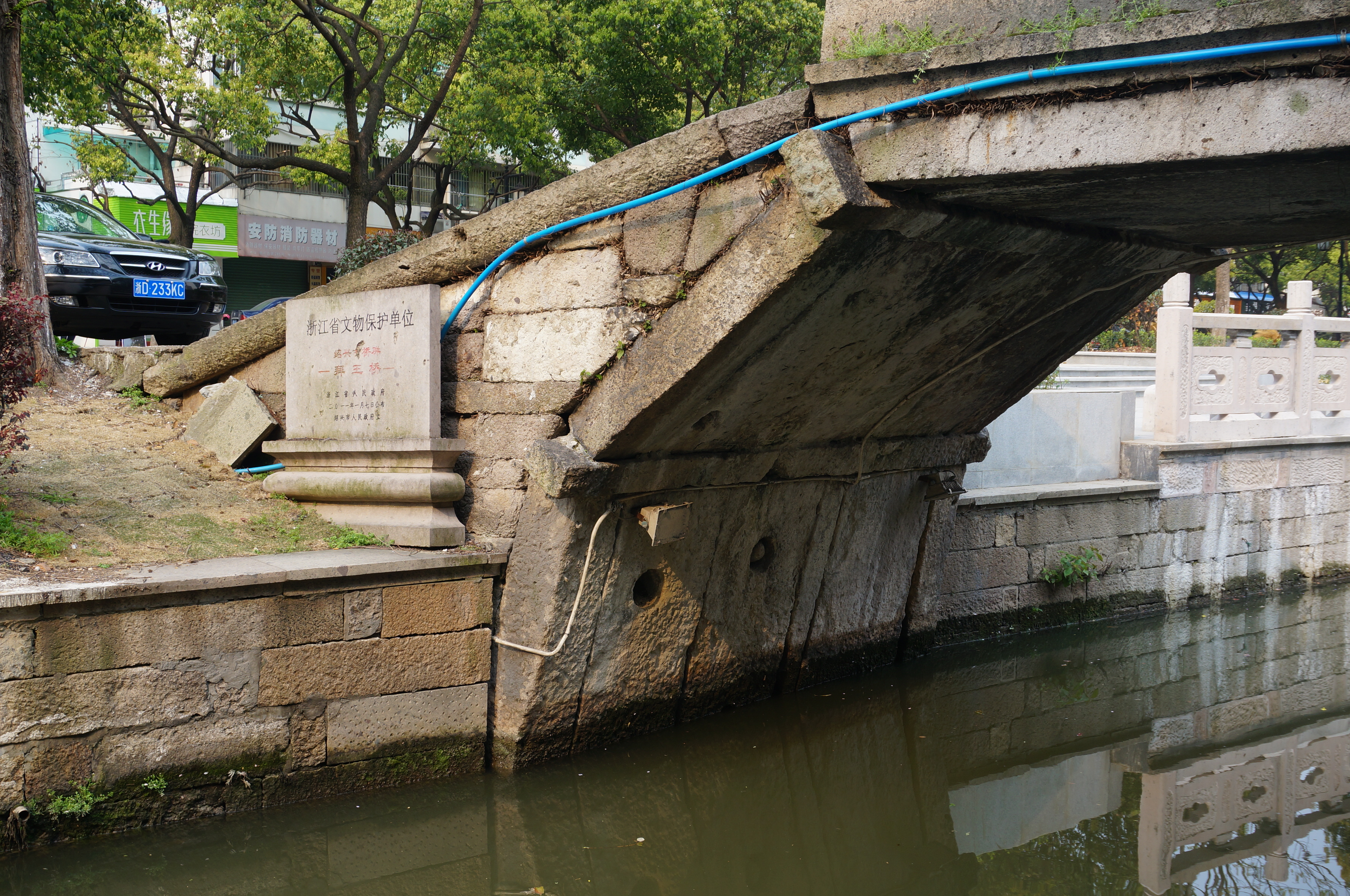
Baiwang Bridge in March 2016

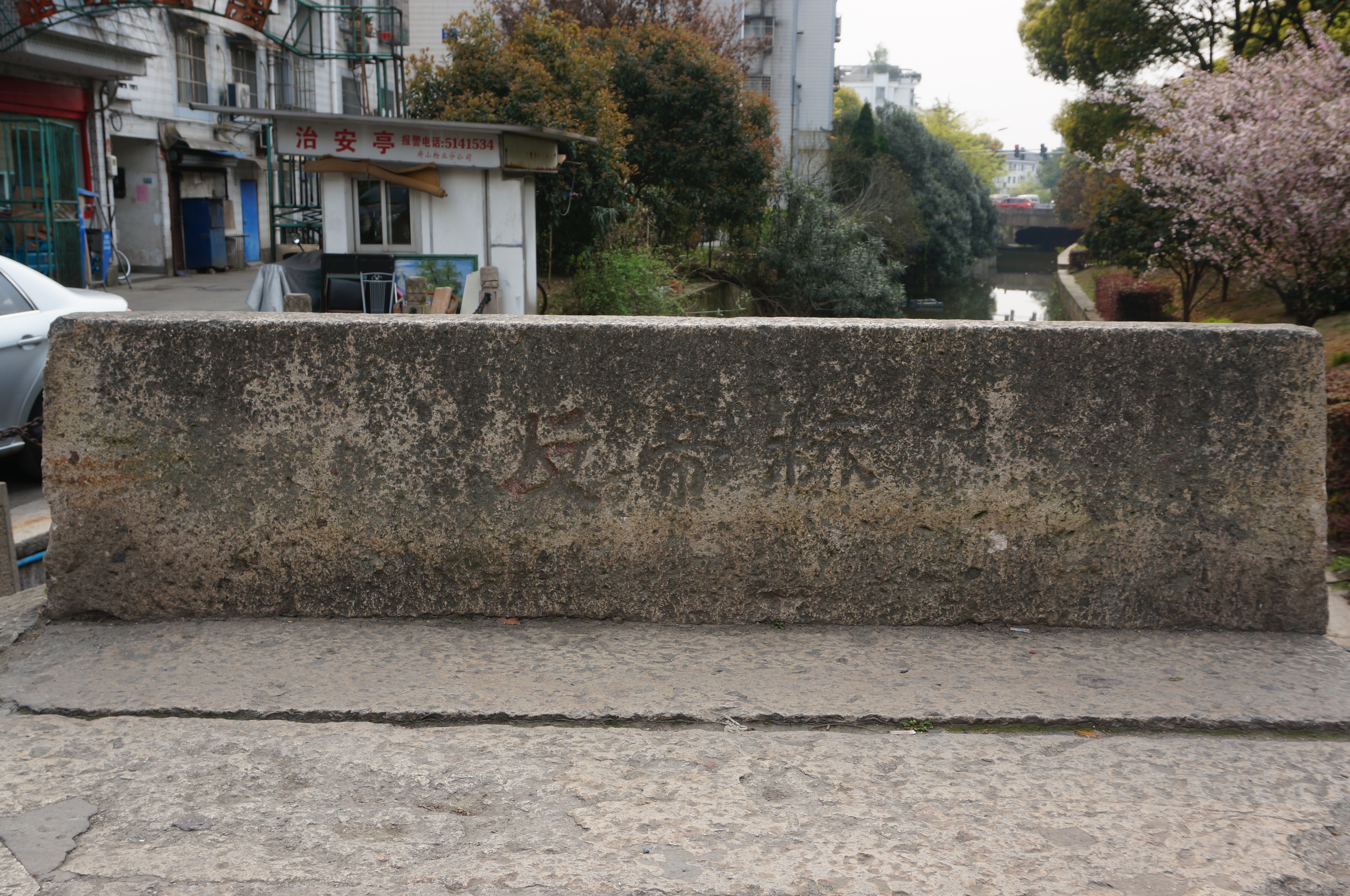
Baiwang Bridge in March 2016
