= Baozhu Bridge =

Baozhu Bridge 宝珠桥
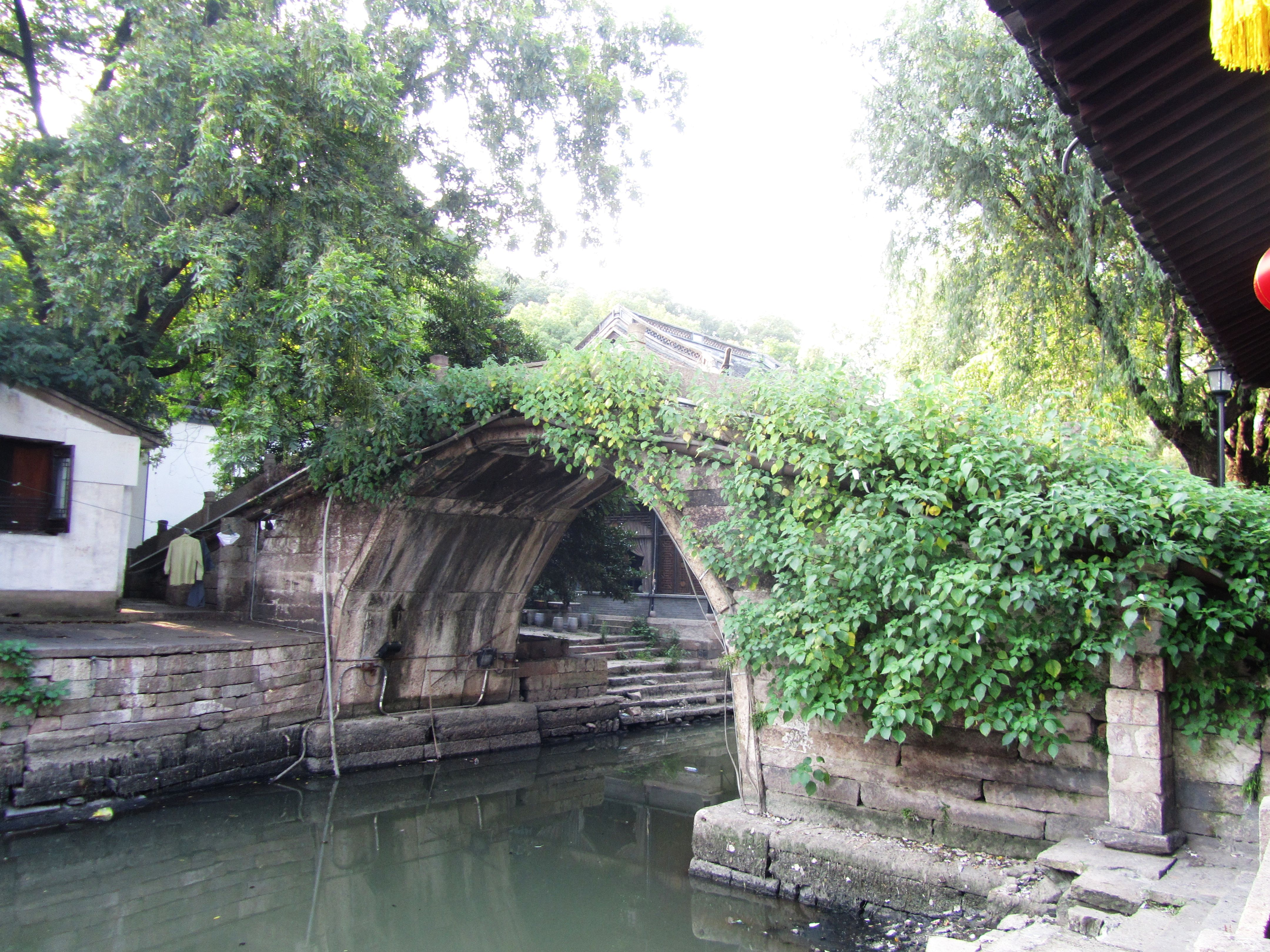
- Baozhu Bridge in July 2012
- Coordinates: 30°00′30″N 120°35′01″E
- Carries: Pedestrians and bicycles
- Locale: Yuecheng District, Shaoxing, Zhejiang, China

Characteristics
- Design: Arch bridge
- Material: Stone
- Total length: 30 metres (98 ft)
- Width: 3.95 metres (13.0 ft)

History
- Rebuilt: 1749

Location
- Interactive map of Baozhu Bridge

The Baozhu Bridge (simplified Chinese: 宝珠桥; traditional Chinese: 寶珠橋; pinyin: Bǎozhū Qiáo), formerly known as Huozhu Bridge (火珠桥; 火珠橋; Huǒzhū Qiáo), is a historic stone arch bridge in Yuecheng District, Shaoxing, Zhejiang, China.

== History ==
Originally built in the Song dynasty (960–1279), the current bridge was rebuilt in 1749 during the ruling of Qianlong Emperor of the Qing dynasty (1644–1911). The bridge has a width of 3.95 metres (13.0 ft) and a length of 30 metres (98 ft). There are seven stone steles on the bridge, of which the largest stone stele in the middle is carved with peach reliefs, and the other six on both sides are carved with Chinese dragon reliefs.

In August 2002, it has been inscribed as a municipal cultural relic preservation organ by the Government of Shaoxing.

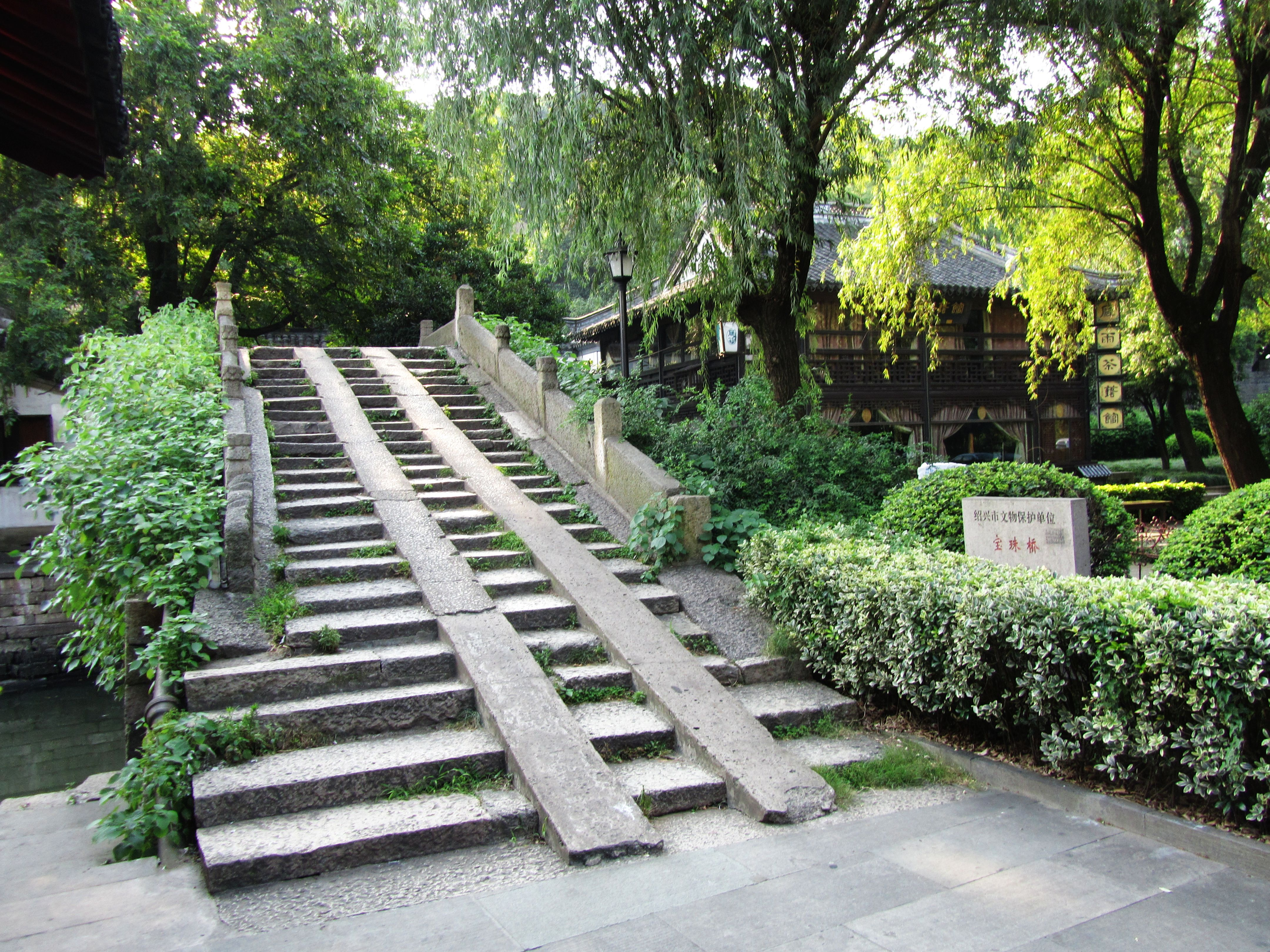
Baozhu Bridge July 2012
