= Guangning Bridge =

Guangning Bridge 广宁桥
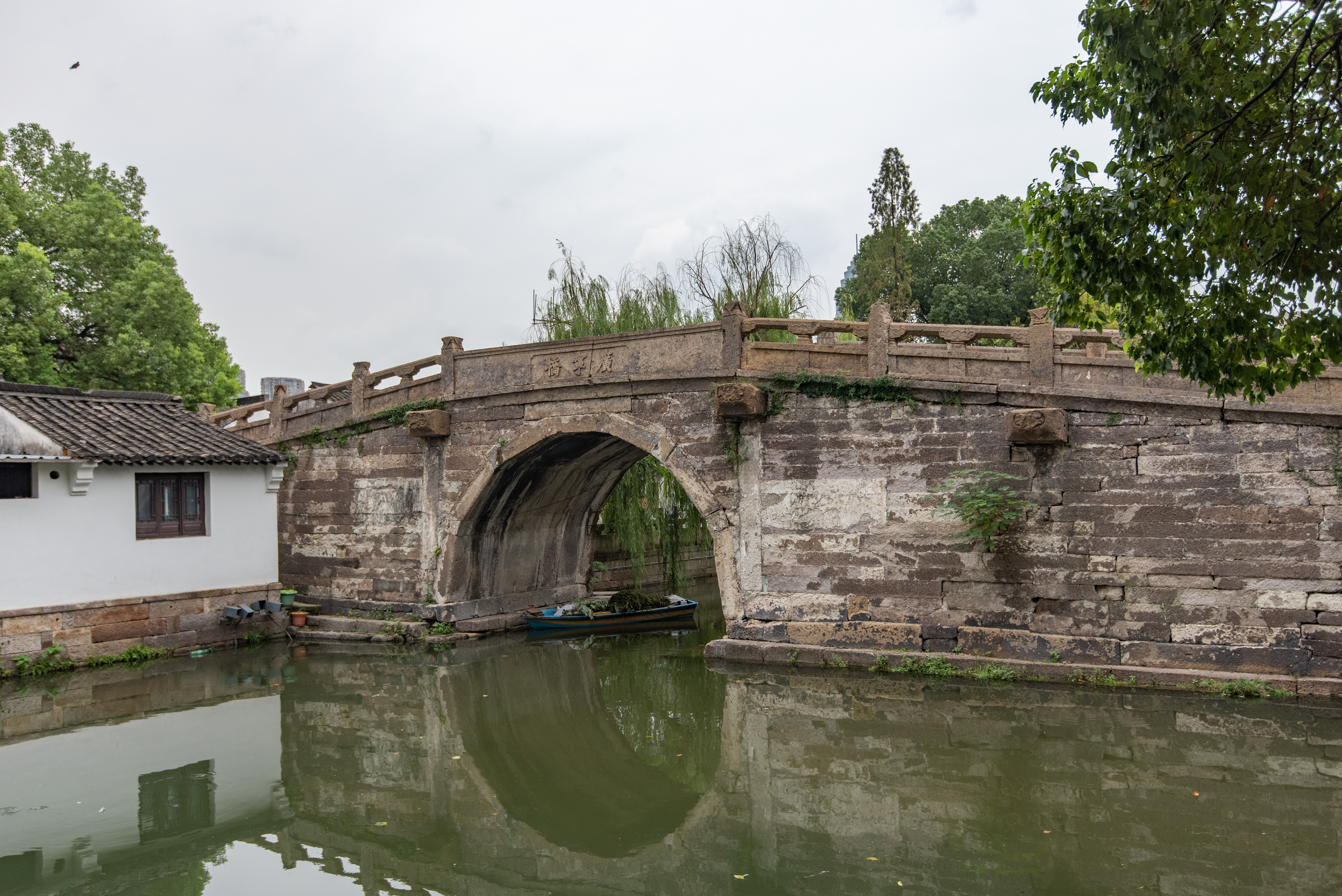
- Guangning Bridge in September 2020
- Coordinates: 30°00′27″N 120°35′52″E
- Carries: Pedestrians
- Crosses: Eastern Zhejiang Canal
- Locale: Yuecheng District of Shaoxing, Zhejiang, China

Characteristics
- Design: Arch bridge
- Material: Stone
- Total length: 60 metres (200 ft)
- Width: 5 metres (16 ft)
- Height: 5.8 metres (19 ft)

History
- Construction end: 1097
- Rebuilt: 1574–1575

Location
- Interactive map of Guangning Bridge

The Guangning Bridge (simplified Chinese: 广宁桥; traditional Chinese: 廣寧橋; pinyin: Guǎngníng Qiáo) is a historic stone arch bridge over the Eastern Zhejiang Canal in Yuecheng District of Shaoxing, Zhejiang, China. The bridge measures 60 metres (200 ft) long, 5 metres (16 ft) wide, and approximately 5.8 metres (19 ft) high.

== History ==
The original bridge dates back to 1097, during the ruling of Emperor Zhezong of the Northern Song dynasty (960–1279), and was rebuilt between 1574 and 1575, during the reign of Wanli Emperor of the Ming dynasty (1368–1644). On 6 May 2013, it was listed among the seventh batch of "Major National Historical and Cultural Sites in Zhejiang" by the State Council of China.

== Gallery ==
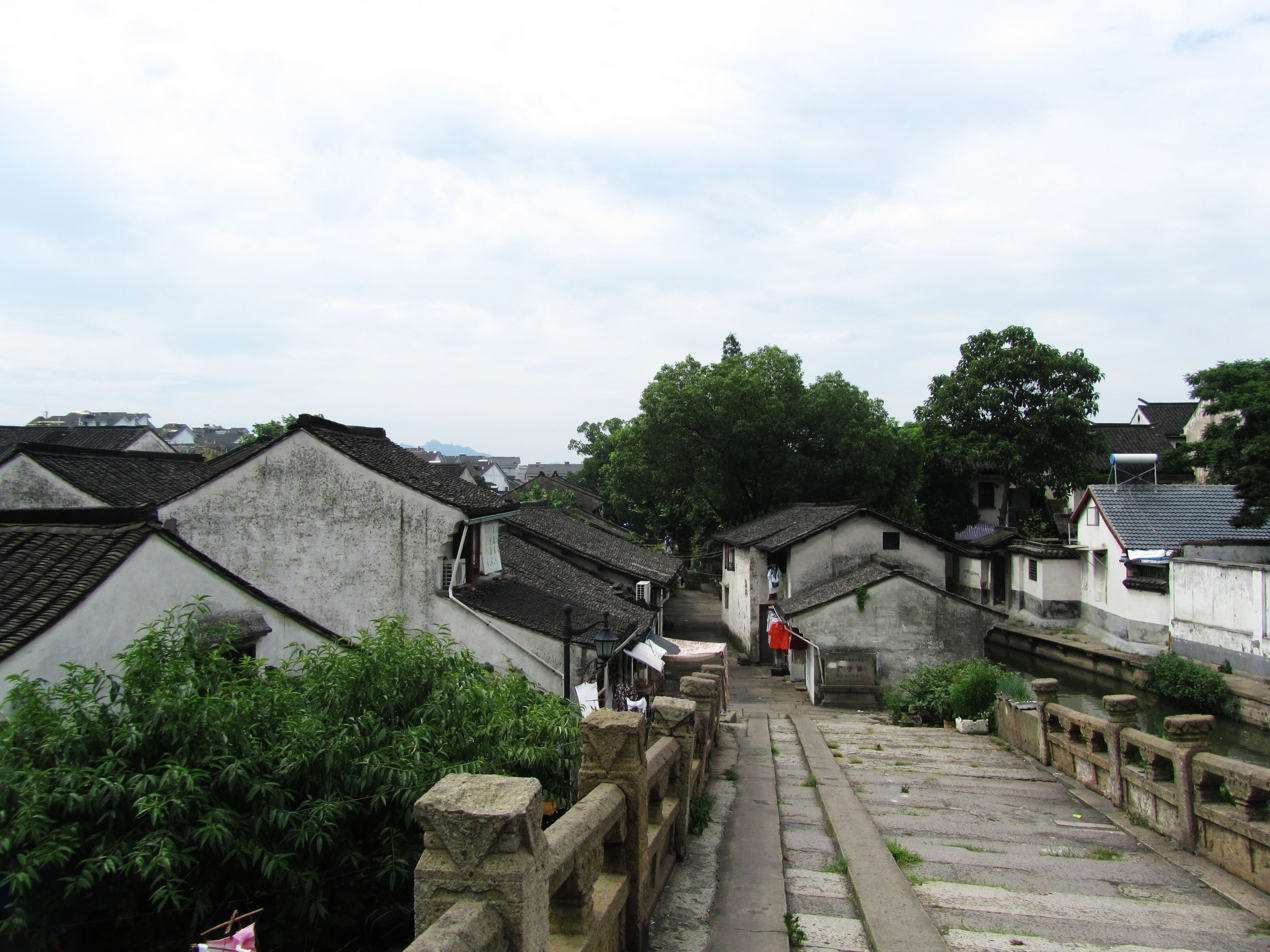
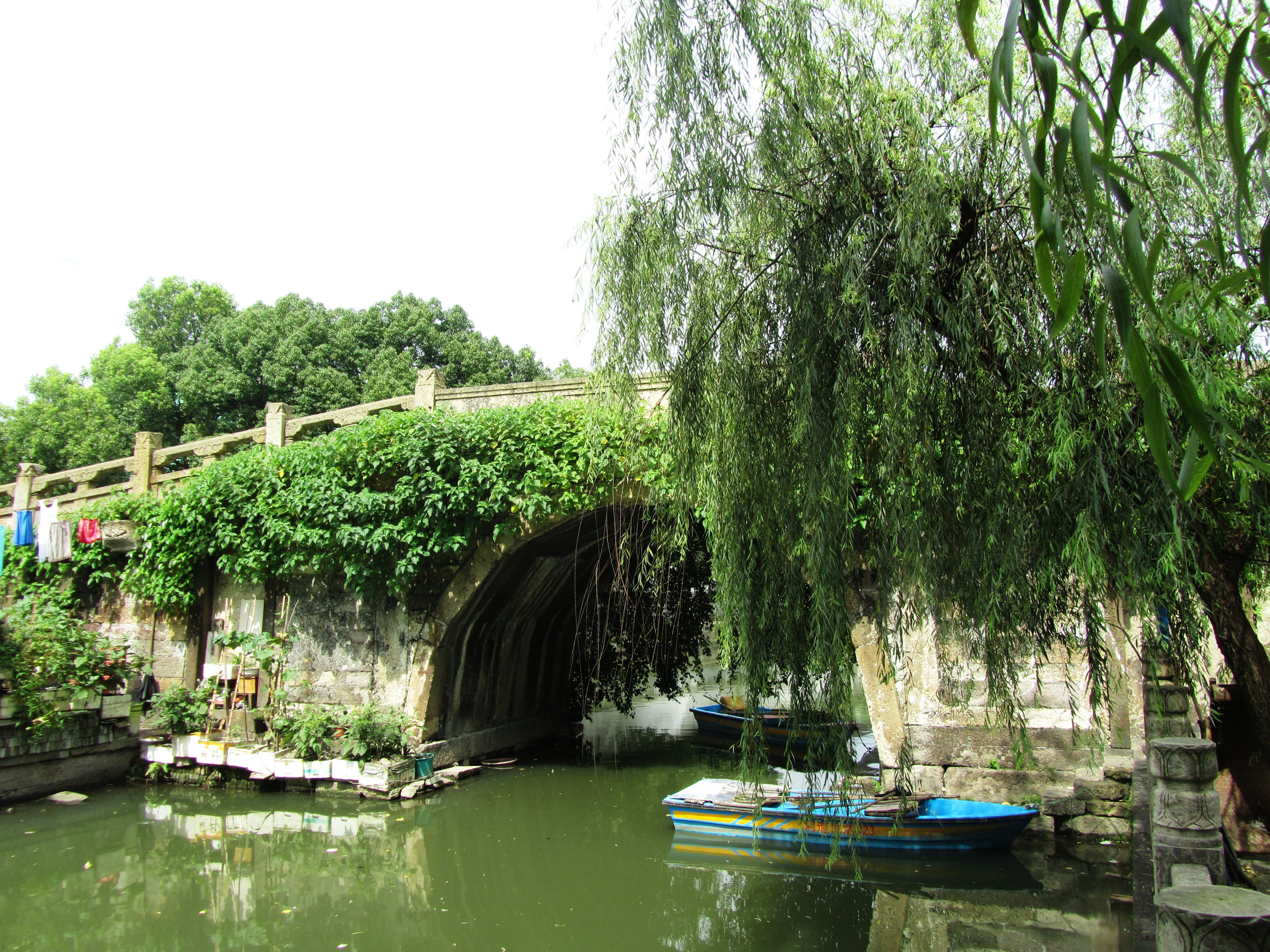

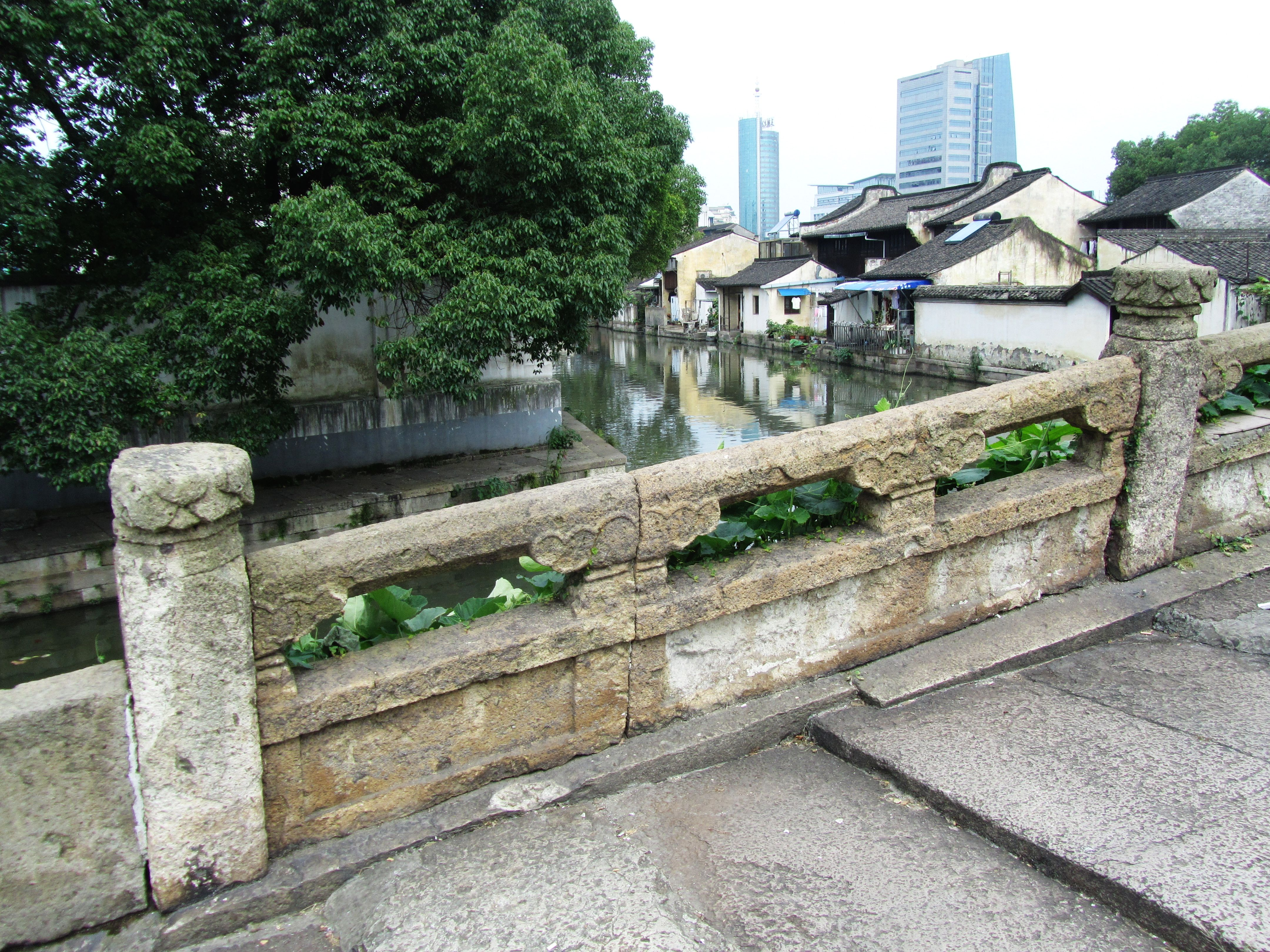
Bridge railings

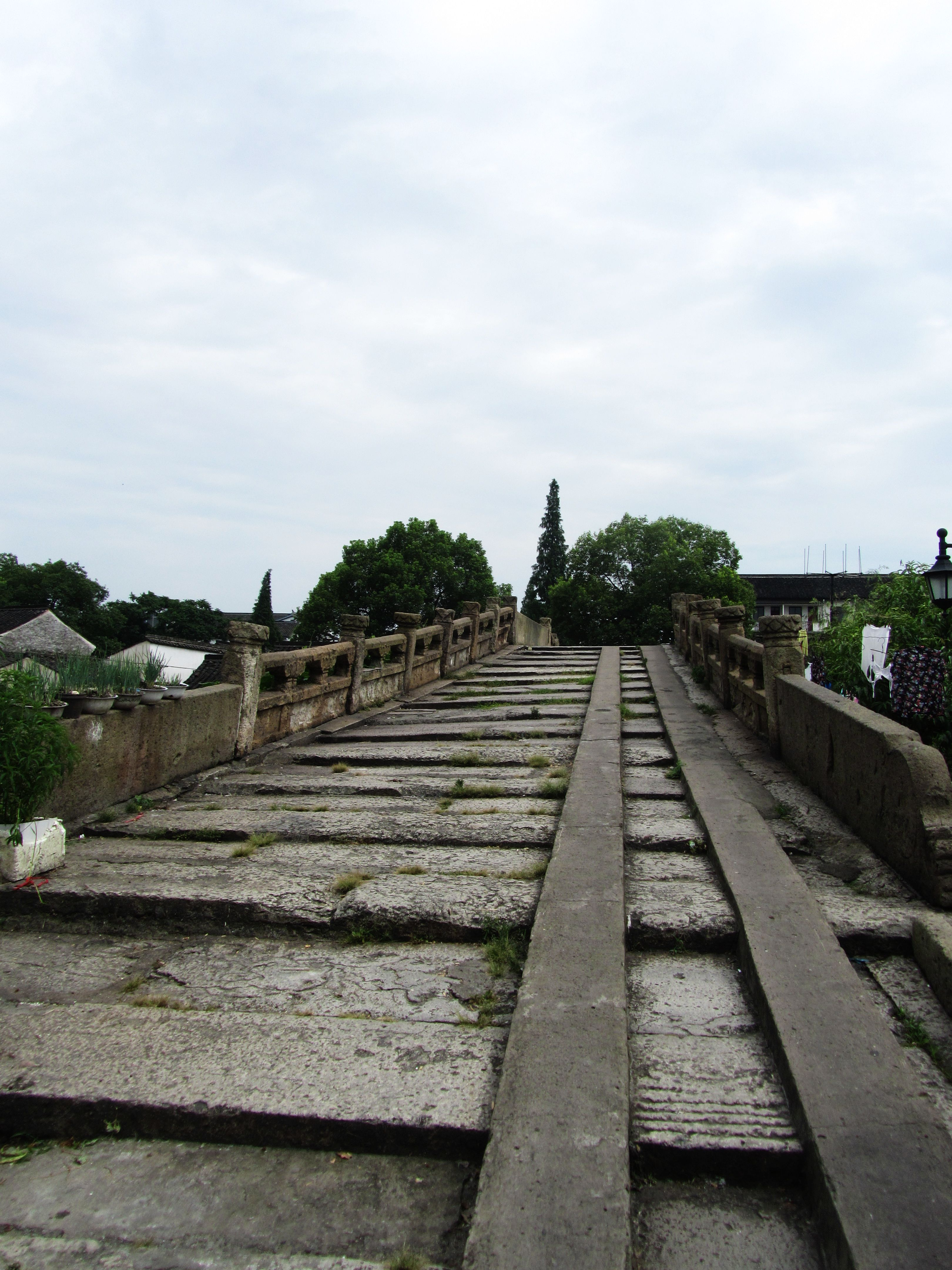
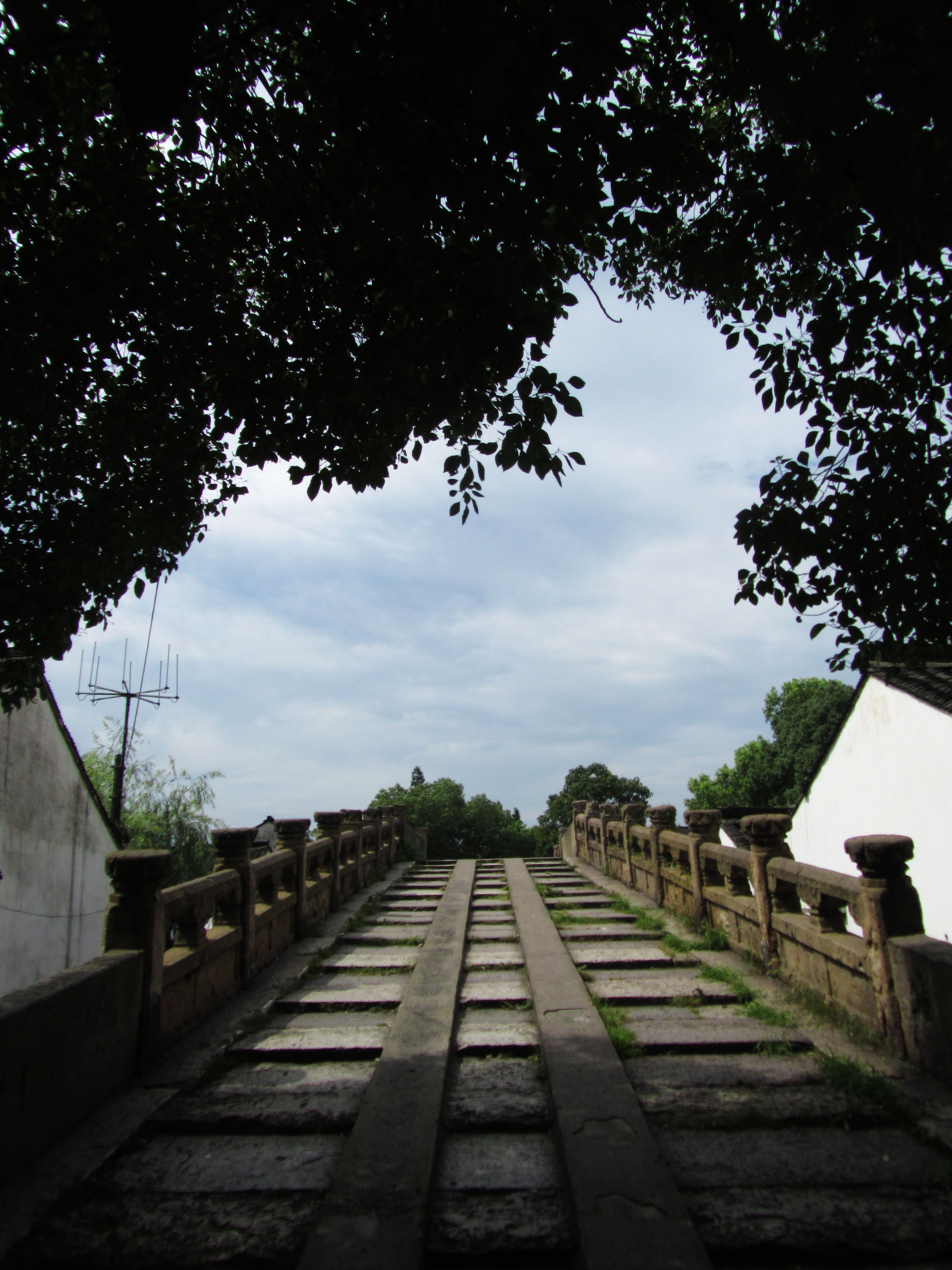

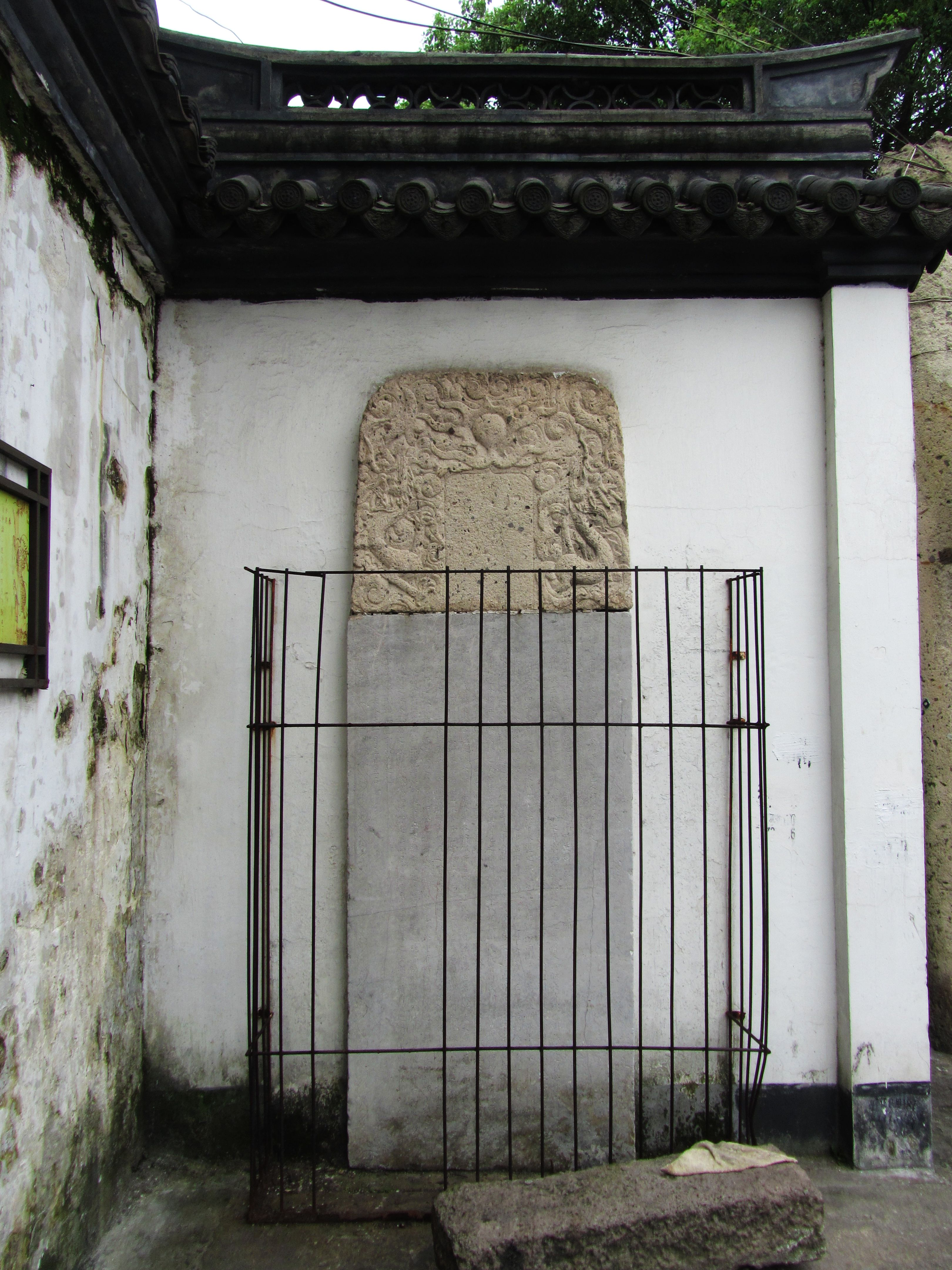
Stele, made in the Wanli ear of the Ming dynasty
