= Yuecheng, Shaoxing =

Yuecheng 越城区
- District
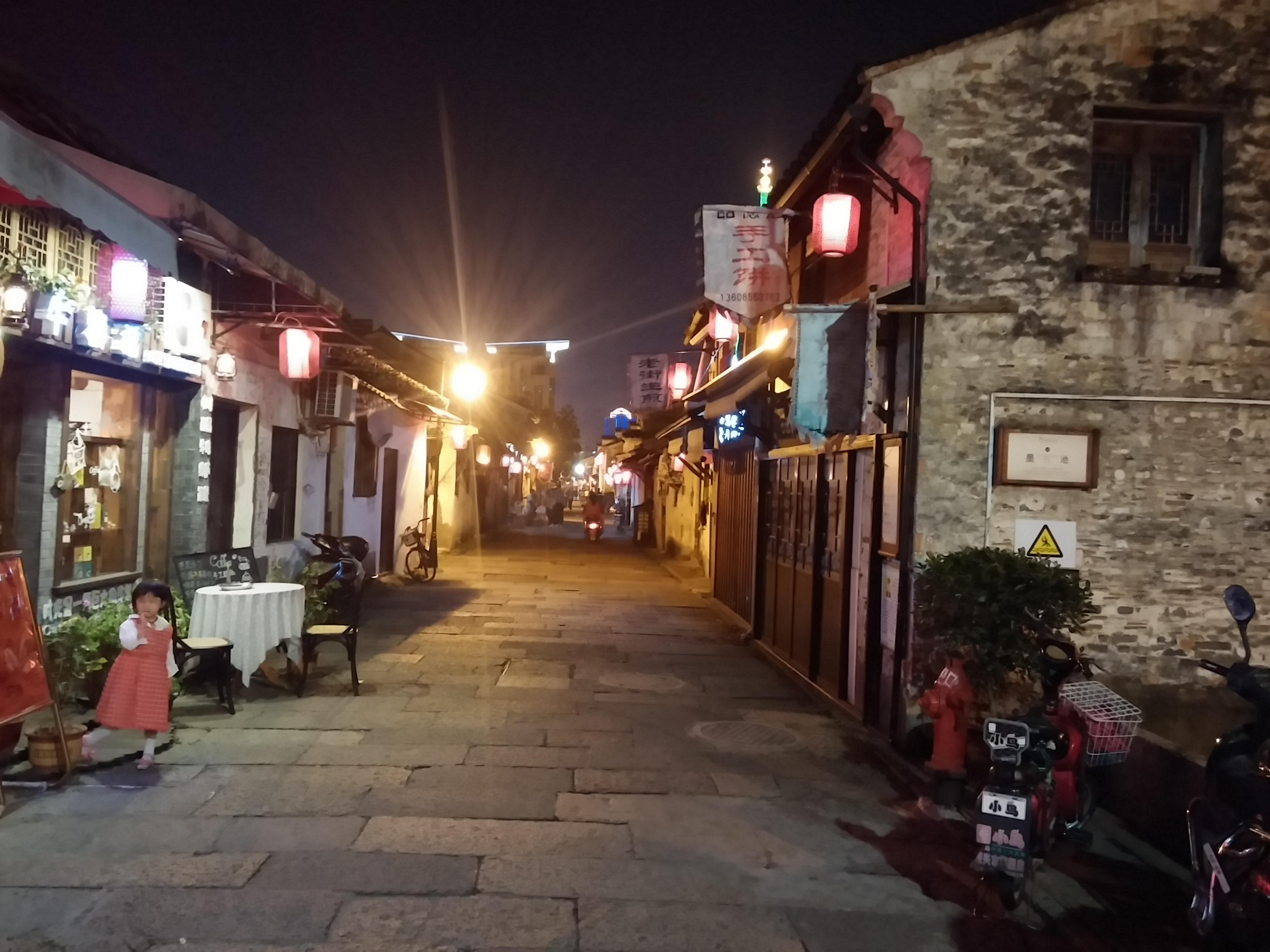
- A neighborhood in Yuecheng

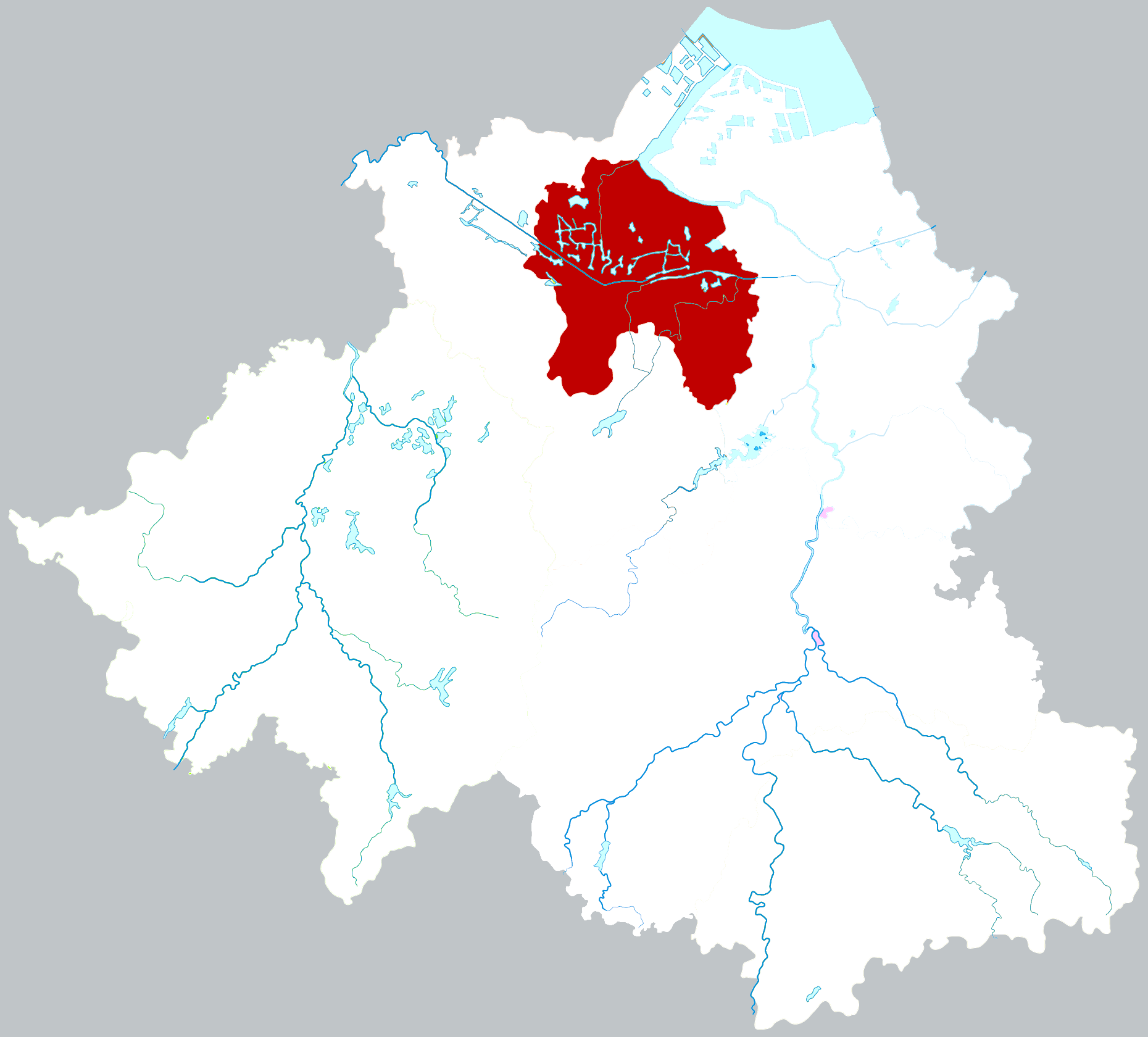
- Location of Yuecheng District within Shaoxing

- Location in Zhejiang
- Coordinates: 29.9918°N 120.559°E
- Country: People's Republic of China
- Province: Zhejiang
- Prefecture-level city: Shaoxing

Area
  - Total: 493.25 km^{2} (190.44 sq mi)

Population (2020)
  - Total: 1,020,037
  - Density: 2,068.0/km^{2} (5,356.1/sq mi)
- Time zone: UTC+8 (China Standard)

Yuecheng District (simplified Chinese: 越城区; traditional Chinese: 越城區; pinyin: Yuèchéng Qū; lit. 'Yue town district') is a county-level district which forms the core of the municipality of Shaoxing, Zhejiang, in the People's Republic of China. It encompasses all of downtown Shaoxing and the immediately surrounding areas, including the former Yue base beside Mount Kuaiji and the imperial Chinese capital of Kuaiji Commandery. The district's total area is 338 square kilometers (131 sq mi) and its population is 610,000 people. The district's postal code is 312000.

The district government is located on Tashan Street at Yan'an Road. The Paojiang Economic and Technical Development Area is located in this district.

== Administrative division ==
The district administers six street offices and seven towns. In total, this encompasses 66 communities, 11 residential areas, and 340 villages. The offices are located on Tashan Street, Fushan Street, Beihai Street, Jishan Street, Chengnan Street, and Qishan Street. The towns are Lingzhi, Donghu, Gaobu, Mashan, Doumen, Jianhu, and Dongpu.

== Tourist attractions ==
The district houses many ancient bridges, including Guangning Bridge, Tishan Bridge, Xiegong Bridge, Baiwang Bridge, and Guangxiang Bridge. They were listed among the seventh batch of "Major National Historical and Cultural Sites in Zhejiang" by the State Council of China in May 2013.
