= List of Major National Historical and Cultural Sites in Zhejiang =

This list is of Major Sites Protected for their Historical and Cultural Value at the National Level in the Province of Zhejiang, People's Republic of China.

Site	Chinese name	Location	Designation	Image
Liuhe Pagoda	Liuhe ta 六和塔	30°11′54″N 120°07′36″E Hangzhou	1-72	Upload file
Baoguo Temple	Baoguo si 保国寺	Ningbo	1-90	Upload file
Tomb of Yue Fei	Yue Fei mu 岳飞墓	Hangzhou	1-176	Upload file
Feilai Feng Grottoes	Feilaifeng zaoxiang 飞来峰造像	30°14′34″N 120°05′48″E Hangzhou	2-15	Upload file
Tianyi Ge	Tianyi ge 天一阁	29°52′22″N 121°32′08″E Ningbo	2-31	Upload file
Hemudu Site	Hemudu yizhi 河姆渡遗址	29°57′51″N 121°20′40″E Yuyao	2-49	Upload file
Residence of Prince Shi of Taiping Heavenly Kingdom	Taiping tianguo Shiwang fu 太平天国侍王府	Jinhua	3-5	Upload file
Former Residence of Lu Xun	Shaoxing Lu Xun guju 绍兴鲁迅故居	Shaoxing	3-8	Upload file
Former Residence of Mao Dun	Mao Dun guju 茅盾故居	Tongxiang	3-13	Upload file
Former Residence of Qiu Jin	Qiu Jin guju 秋瑾故居	Shaoxing	3-17	Upload file
Tuoshan Weir	Tuoshan yan 它山堰	Ningbo	3-55	Upload file
Ancient Track Road in Shaoxing	Guqiandao 古纤道	Shaoxing	3-70	Upload file
Hu Qing Yu Tang	Hu Qing Yu Tang 胡庆余堂	Hangzhou	3-79	Upload file
Lu Residence of Dongyang	Dongyang Luzhai 东阳卢宅	Dongyang	3-89	Upload file
Main Hall of Tianning Temple	Tianning si dadian 天宁寺大殿	Jinhua	3-116	Upload file
Zhakou White Pagoda	Zhakou baita 闸口白塔	Hangzhou	3-142	Upload file
Feiying Pagoda	Feiying ta 飞英塔	Huzhou	3-148	Upload file
Shanglin Lake Yue Kilns	Shanglin Hu Yueyao yizhi 上林湖越窑遗址	Cixi	3-222	Upload file
Dayao Longquan Kiln Sites	Dayao Longquan yao yizhi 大窑龙泉窑遗址	Longquan	3-228	Upload file
Liangzhu site	Liangzhu yizhi 良渚遗址	Hangzhou	4-8	Upload file
Mausoleum of Yu the Great	Dayu ling 大禹陵	Shaoxing	4-77	Upload file
Ancestral Temple of the Southern Branch of the Kong Clan	Kongshi nanzong jiamiao 孔氏南宗家庙	Quzhou	4-102	Upload file
Yanfu Temple	Yanfu si 延福寺	Wuyi County	4-121	Upload file
Residences of Zhuge and Changle villages	Zhuge, Changle cun minju 诸葛、长乐村民居	29°15′05″N 119°17′31″E Lanxi	4-138	Upload file
Puzhuangsuo Fortress	Puzhuangsuo cheng 蒲壮所城	Cangnan County	4-139	Upload file
Coastal Defences at Zhenhai	Zhenhaikou haifang yizhi 镇海口海防遗址	Ningbo	4-140	Upload file
Yuhai Hall	Yuhai lou 玉海楼	Rui'an	4-171	Upload file
Former Residence of Chiang Kai-shek	Jiang shi guju 蒋氏故居	Fenghua	4-222	Upload file
Luojiajiao site	Luojiajiao yizhi 罗家角遗址	Tongxiang	5-39	Upload file
Majiabang site	Majiabang yizhi 马家浜遗址	30°44′09″N 120°42′54″E Jiaxing	5-40	Upload file
Xiagucheng site	Xiagucheng yizhi 下菰城遗址	Huzhou	5-41	Upload file
Site of Lin'an City	Lin'an cheng yizhi 临安城遗址	Hangzhou	5-42	Upload file
Tiedian Kiln Site	Tiedian yao yizhi 铁店窑遗址	Jinhua	5-43	Upload file
Stone Tombs in South Zhejiang	Zhenan shipengmu qun 浙南石棚墓群	Rui'an, Pingyang County, Cangnan County	5-161	Upload file
Yinshan Mausoleum of the King of Yue	Yinshan Yueguo wang ling 印山越国王陵	Shaoxing County	5-162	Upload file
Mausoleums of Wuyue Kings	Wuyue guo wangling 吴越国王陵	Lin'an	5-163	Upload file
Guyue Bridge	Guyue qiao 古月桥	Yiwu	5-289	Upload file
Bamian Hall in Huangshan	Huangshan Bamianting 黄山八面厅	Yiwu	5-290	Upload file
Guoqing Temple	Guoqing si 国清寺	29°10′44″N 121°02′32″E Tiantai County	5-291	Upload file
Temple and Tomb of Liu Ji	Liu Ji miao ji mu 刘基庙及墓	Wencheng County	5-292	Upload file
Nange Archways	Nange pailou qun 南阁牌楼群	Yueqing	5-293	Upload file
Qing'an Guildhall	Qing'an huiguan 庆安会馆	Ningbo	5-294	Upload file
Huzhen Pagoda	Huzhen sheli ta 湖镇舍利塔	Longyou County	5-295	Upload file
Rulong Bridge	Rulong qiao 如龙桥	Qingyuan County	5-296	Upload file
Tongji Weir	Tongji yan 通济堰	Lishui	5-297	Upload file
Phoenix Mosque	Fenghuang si 凤凰寺	Hangzhou	5-298	Upload file
Wenlan Pavilion	Wenlan ge 文澜阁	Hangzhou	5-299	Upload file
Old Buildings of Yuyuan Village	Yuyuancun gu jianzhuqun 俞源村古建筑群	Wuyi County	5-300	Upload file
Bazi Bridge	Bazi qiao 八字桥	Shaoxing	5-301	Upload file
Lü Residence of Shaoxing	Lü fu 吕府	Shaoxing	5-302	Upload file
Gongchen Pagoda	Gongchen ta 功臣塔	Lin'an	5-303	Upload file
City Wall of Taizhou	Taizhou fu chengqiang 台州府城墙	Linhai	5-304	Upload file
Taozhu City	Taozhu cheng 桃渚城	Linhai	5-305	Upload file
Old Buildings of Zhengyimen	Zhengyimen gu jianzhuqun 郑义门古建筑群	Pujiang County	5-306	Upload file
Sea Wall and Sea God Temple in Yanguan	Yanguan haitang ji haishen miao 盐官海塘及海神庙	Haining	5-307	Upload file
Qi Garden	Qiyuan 绮园	Haiyan County	5-308	Upload file
Old Buildings of the Si Family Residence	Sishi gu minju jianzhuqun 斯氏古民居建筑群	Zhuji	5-309	Upload file
Shisi Temple	Shisi si 时思寺	Jingning County	5-310	Upload file
Yongchang Fortress	Yongchang bao 永昌堡	Wenzhou	5-311	Upload file
Jiayetang Library and Lesser Lotus Manor	Jiayetang cangshulou ji xiaolianzhuang 嘉业堂藏书楼及小莲庄	Huzhou	5-312	Upload file
Stone Arches of Miaogouhou and Hengsheng	Miaogouhou, Hengsheng shipaifeng 庙沟后、横省石牌坊	Ningbo	5-313	Upload file
Xiandu Rock Inscriptions	Xiandu moya tiji 仙都摩崖题记	Jinyun County	5-448	Upload file
Mahakala Statue of Baocheng Temple	Baocheng si Mahegela zaoxiang 宝成寺麻曷葛剌造像	Hangzhou	5-449	Upload file
Stone Carvings around Dongqian Lake	Dongqian Hu shike 东钱湖石刻	29°46′00″N 121°40′01″E Ningbo	5-450	Upload file
Dharani Pillars of Fantian Temple	Fantian si jingchuang 梵天寺经幢	Hangzhou	5-451	Upload file
Xiling Seal Art Society	Xiling yinshe 西泠印社	Hangzhou	5-486	Upload file
Former Residence of Cai Yuanpei	Cai Yuanpei guju 蔡元培故居	Shaoxing	5-487	Upload file
Zhang Residence of Nanxun	Nanxun Zhangshi jiuzhai jianzhuqun 南浔张氏旧宅建筑群	Huzhou	5-488	Upload file
Old Buildings of the Yu Residence of Longshan	Longshan Yushi jiuzhai janzhuqun 龙山虞氏旧宅建筑群	Cixi	5-489	Upload file
Site of Jiangsu-Zhejiang Military Region of the New Fourth Army	Xinsijun Su Zhe junqu jiuzhi 新四军苏浙军区旧址	Changxing County	5-490	Upload file
Siliandui Paper Workshop	Siliandui zaozhi zuofang 四连碓造纸作坊	Wenzhou	5-517	Upload file
Huaniaoshan Beacon	Huaniao dengta 花鸟灯塔	Shengsi County	5-518	Upload file
Kuahuqiao site	Kuahuqiao yizhi 跨湖桥遗址	Hangzhou	6-82	Upload file
Shangshan Site	Shangshan yizhi 上山遗址	Pujiang County	6-83	Upload file
Tanjiawan Site	Tanjiawan yizhi 谭家湾遗址	Tongxiang	6-84	Upload file
Nanhebang Site	Nanhebang yizhi 南河浜遗址	Jiaxing	6-85	Upload file
Qianshanyang Site	Qianshanyang yizhi 钱山漾遗址	Huzhou	6-86	Upload file
Maowanli Site	Maowanli yaozhi 茅湾里窑址	Hangzhou	6-87	Upload file
Fusheng Kiln Site	Fusheng yao zhi 富盛窑址	Shaoxing County	6-88	Upload file
Dipu City site	Dipu chengzhi 递铺城址	Anji County	6-89	Upload file
Xiaoxiantan Kiln Site	Xiaoxiantan yao zhi 小仙坛窑址	Shangyu	6-90	Upload file
Jiaotanxia and Laohudong kiln sites	Jiaotanxia he Laohudong yaozhi 郊坛下和老虎洞窑址	Hangzhou	6-91	Upload file
Yongfeng Warehouse	Yongfeng ku yizhi 永丰库遗址	Ningbo	6-92	Upload file
Burial Mounds of Dongyang	Dongyang tudunmu qun 东阳土墩墓群	Dongyang	6-249	Upload file
Gao Clan Cemetery	Gaoshi jiazu mudi 高氏家族墓地	Yueqing	6-250	Upload file
Tomb of Yu Qian	Yu Qian mu 于谦墓	Hangzhou	6-251	Upload file
Tianning Temple, Ningbo	Ningbo tianning si 宁波天宁寺	Ningbo	6-539	Upload file
Dusong Pass and Post Road	Dusongguan he gu yidao 独松关和古驿道	Anji County	6-540	Upload file
Locks and Bridges on the Xinhe River	Xinhe zhaqiao qun 新河闸桥群	Wenling	6-541	Upload file
Yanqing Temple Pagoda	Songyang Yanqing si ta 松阳延庆寺塔	Songyang County	6-542	Upload file
Shouchang Bridge	Shouchang qiao 寿昌桥	Deqing County	6-543	Upload file
Chixi Wudong Bridge	Chixi Wudong qiao 赤溪五洞桥	Cangnan County	6-544	Upload file
Ashoka Temple	Ayuwang si 阿育王寺	Ningbo	6-545	Upload file
Duobao Pagoda, Mount Putuo	Putuoshan Duobao ta 普陀山多宝塔	Zhoushan	6-546	Upload file
Baiyunzhuang and Tombs of Huang Zongxi, Wan Sitong, Quan Zusheng	Baiyunzhuang he Huang Zongxi, Wan Sitong, Quan Zusheng mu 白云庄和黄宗羲、万斯同、全祖望墓	Ningbo	6-547	Upload file
Old Buildings of Zhiyan Village	Zhiyan cun jianzhuqun 芝堰村建筑群	Lanxi	6-548	Upload file
Old Buildings of Furong Village	Furongcun gu jianzhuqun 芙蓉村古建筑群	Yongjia County	6-549	Upload file
City Wall of Quzhou	Quzhou chengqiang 衢州城墙	Quzhou	6-550	Upload file
City Wall of Ancheng	Ancheng chengqiang 安城城墙	Anji County	6-551	Upload file
Shengjingshan Stone Hall	Shengjing shan shidian 圣井山石殿	Rui'an	6-552	Upload file
Old Buildings of Cicheng	Cicheng gu jianzhuqun 慈城古建筑群	Ningbo	6-553	Upload file
Tiantong Temple	Tiantong si 天童寺	Ningbo	6-554	Upload file
Former Residence and Tomb of Wang Shouren	Wang Shouren guju he mu 王守仁故居和墓	Yuyao	6-555	Upload file
Qingteng Studio and Tomb of Xu Wei	Qingteng shuwu he Xu Wei mu 青藤书屋和徐渭墓	Shaoxing	6-556	Upload file
Ninghai Old Stage	Ninghai gu xitai 宁海古戏台	Ninghai County	6-557	Upload file
Covered Bridges of Taishun	Taishun langqiao 泰顺廊桥	Taishun County	6-558	Upload file 仙居桥
Dingbu of Shishui	Shishui dingbu 仕水矴步 (auch 仕水碇歩, 仕水碇埠)	Taishun County	6-559	Upload file
Yushan Tea Plantation	Yushan gu chachang 玉山古茶场	Pan'an County	6-560	Upload file
Kong Family Ancestral Temple in Juxi	Juxi Kongshi jiamiao 榉溪孔氏家庙	Pan'an County	6-561	Upload file
Old Buildings of Chongren Village	Chongren cun jianzhuqun 崇仁村建筑群	Shengzhou	6-562	Upload file
Sanqingkou Porcleain Workshops	Sanqingkou zhici zuofang 三卿口制瓷作坊	Jiangshan	6-563	Upload file
Old Buildings of Shunxi	Shunxi gu jianzhuqun 顺溪古建筑群	Pingyang County	6-564	Upload file
Mo Family Estate	Moshi zhuangyuan 莫氏庄园	Pinghu	6-565	Upload file
Fayu Temple	Fayu si 法雨寺	Zhoushan	6-566	Upload file
Tea Tribute Institution and Rock Inscriptions of Guzhu	Guzhu gongchayuan ji moya 顾渚贡茶院遗址及摩崖	Changxing County	6-822	Upload file
Dharani Pillars of Anguo Temple	Anguo si jingchuang 安国寺经幢	Haining	6-823	Upload file
Dharani Pillars of Falong Temple	Falong si jingchuang 法隆寺经幢	Jinhua	6-824	Upload file
Datong Academy and Former Residence of Xu Xilin	Datongxuetang he Xu Xilin guju 大通学堂和徐锡麟故居	Shaoxing	6-944	Upload file
Cathedral of Our Lady of the Seven Sorrows	Jiangbei an sheng mu qi ku zhu jiao zuo tang 江北岸圣母七苦主教座堂	Ningbo	6-945	Upload file
Liji Medicine School	Liji yixue tang jiuzhi 利济医学堂旧址	Rui'an	6-946	Upload file
Former Residence of Wang Guowei	Wang Guowei guju 王国维故居	Haining	6-947	Upload file
Former Residence of Ma Yinchu	Ma Yinchu guju 马寅初故居	Shengzhou	6-948	Upload file
Villas of Mount Mogan	Mogan shan bieshuqun 莫干山别墅群	Deqing County	6-949	Upload file
Qiantang River Bridge	Qiantang Jiang daqiao 钱塘江大桥	Hangzhou	6-950	Upload file
Hangchow University site	Zhijiang daxue jiuzhi 之江大学旧址	Hangzhou	6-951	Upload file
Jianqiao National School of Aviation site	Jianqiao Zhongyang hang-xiao jiuzhi 笕桥中央航校旧址	Hangzhou	6-952	Upload file
Former Residence of Zhang Taiyan	Zhang Taiyan guju 章太炎故居	Hangzhou	6-953	Upload file
Old Bank Building, Ningbo	Qianye huiguan 钱业会馆	Ningbo	6-954	Upload file
Tomb of Chen Yingshi	Chen Yingshi mu 陈英士墓	Huzhou	6-955	Upload file
Site of the East Zhejiang Base in the Second Sino-Japanese War	Zhedong Kang-Ri genjudi jiuzhi 浙东抗日根据地旧址	Yuyao	6-956	Upload file

== See also ==
- Principles for the Conservation of Heritage Sites in China
