= Nanxun =

Nanxun 南浔镇
- Town
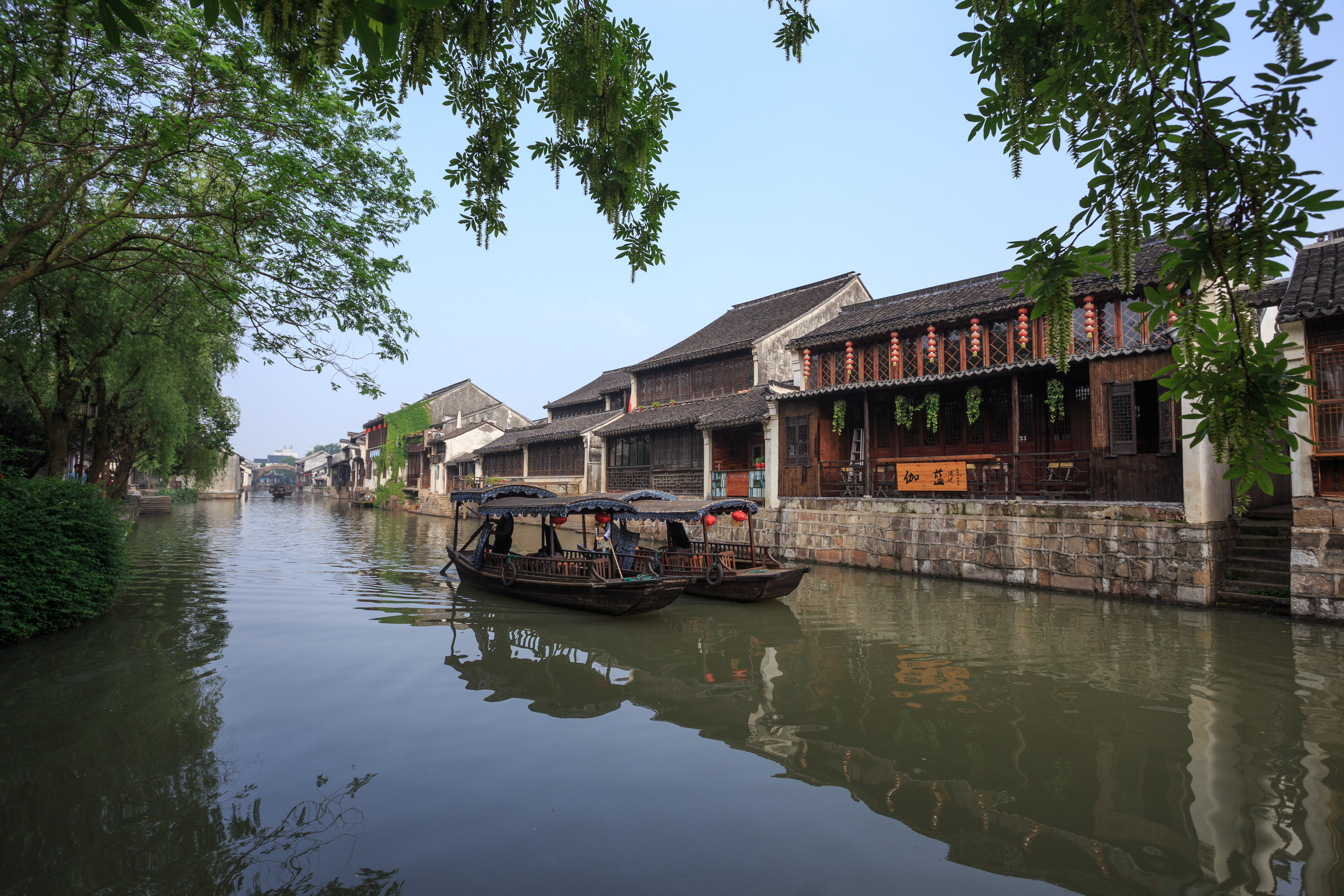
- Nanxun in May 2017.

- Location in Zhejiang.
- Coordinates (Nanxun Town government): 30°52′03″N 120°25′30″E
- Country: China
- Province: Zhejiang
- Prefecture: Huzhou
- District: Nanxun District

Area
  - Total: 141 km^{2} (54 sq mi)

Population (2007)
  - Total: 119,300
  - Density: 846/km^{2} (2,190/sq mi)
- Time zone: UTC+8 (China Standard)
- Postal code: 313009
- Area code: 0572

Nanxun (simplified Chinese: 南浔镇; traditional Chinese: 南潯鎮; pinyin: Nánxún Zhèn) is a historic town in Nanxun District of Huzhou, Zhejiang, China. As of the 2007 census it had a population of 119,300 and an area of 141-square-kilometre (54 sq mi).

== Name ==
The name of Nanxun was coined by a combination of the initial Chinese characters of two place' names in the region: "Nanlin" (Chinese: 南林; lit. 'Southern Wood') and "Xunxi" (Chinese: 浔溪; lit. 'Xun Stream').

== History ==
Established in 1252 in the Southern Song dynasty (1127–1279), Nanxun is located in the northeast of Huzhou city. It was one of the richest towns in Jiangnan from mid-Ming down to mid-Qing dynasties. During this period, with the development of silk industry and rise of commodity economy, it experienced unprecedented prosperity, and developed into the center of China's silk trade at the beginning of 20th century. It became the most prosperous town in Jiangnan region, producing hundreds of magnates. As a popular saying went, "What counts as a city in Huzhou is barely half the size of Nanxun." (湖州一个城，不及南浔半个镇)

== Religion ==
The introduction of Christianity into the Nanxun area began in 1860, belonging to the American Methodist Episcopal Mission. The Nanxun Christian Church is a Protestant church in the town. It was built in 1927.

The Guanghui Palace is a Taoist temple in the town. It was first established in the Northern Song dynasty (960–1127) and was destroyed and rebuilt many times. The present version was completed in 2003.

== Tourist attractions ==
Nanxun once had a large number of gardens. From the Southern Song dynasty down to the Qing dynasty (1644–1911) it had housed as much as 27 gardens. Among the survived ones are the Baijian Houses, Jiaye Library, Liu's Xiaolian Manor, (Chen's) Ying Garden and (Zhang's) Shi Garden.

Nanxun is also the home to the Former Residence of Zhang Shiming and Former Residence of Zhang Jingjiang.

Nanxun has more well-preserved ancient bridges of the Ming (1368–1644) and Qing dynasties (1644–1911) with hundreds of years of history, such as Tongjin Bridge, Hongji Bridge, Guanghui Bridge, and Chuihong Bridge.

== Notable people ==
- Zhu Guozhen, an official, historian, and scholar of the Ming dynasty.
- Zhuang Yuncheng
- Zhuang Tinglong, historian.
- Tang Yuanlou, historian.
- Zhang Songxian, a tycoon in Nanxun.
- Liu Yong (businessman), a tycoon in Nanxun.
- Liu Jinzao, philologist.
- Zhang Renjie, a political figure and financial entrepreneur in the Republic of China.
- Jin Zhang, prominent painter and calligrapher

== Gallery ==
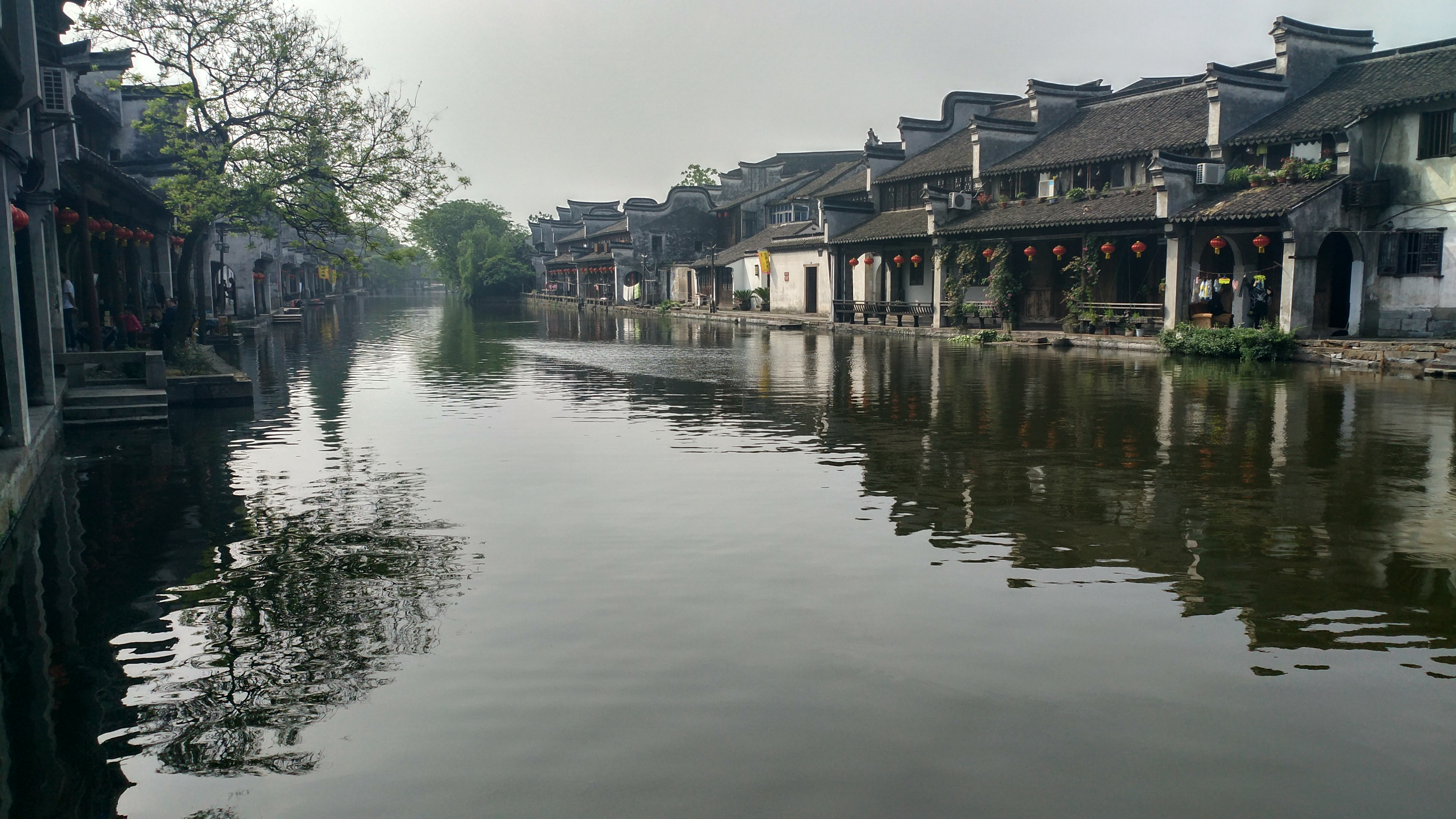
Baijian Houses.

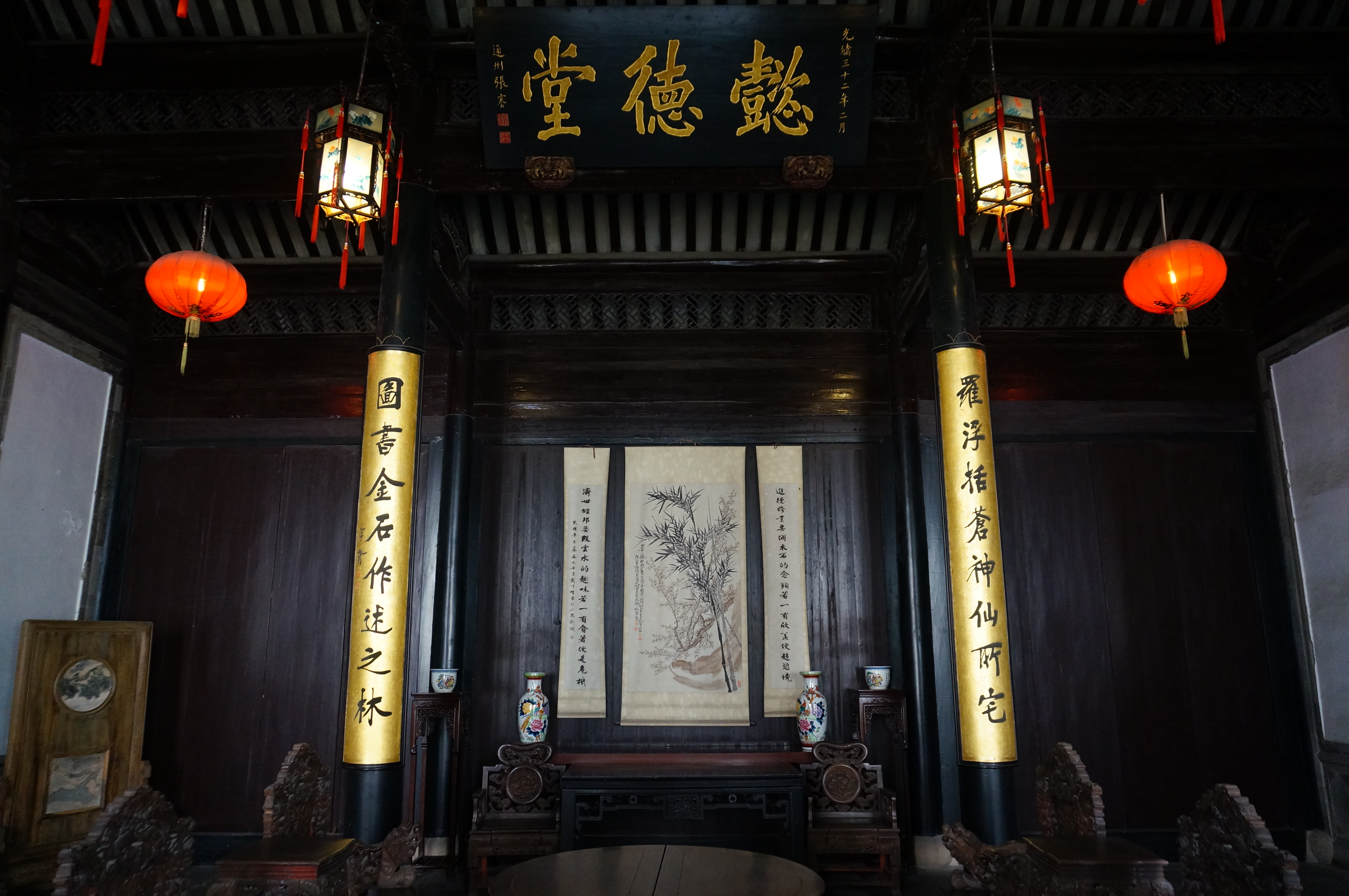
Former Residence of Zhang Shiming.

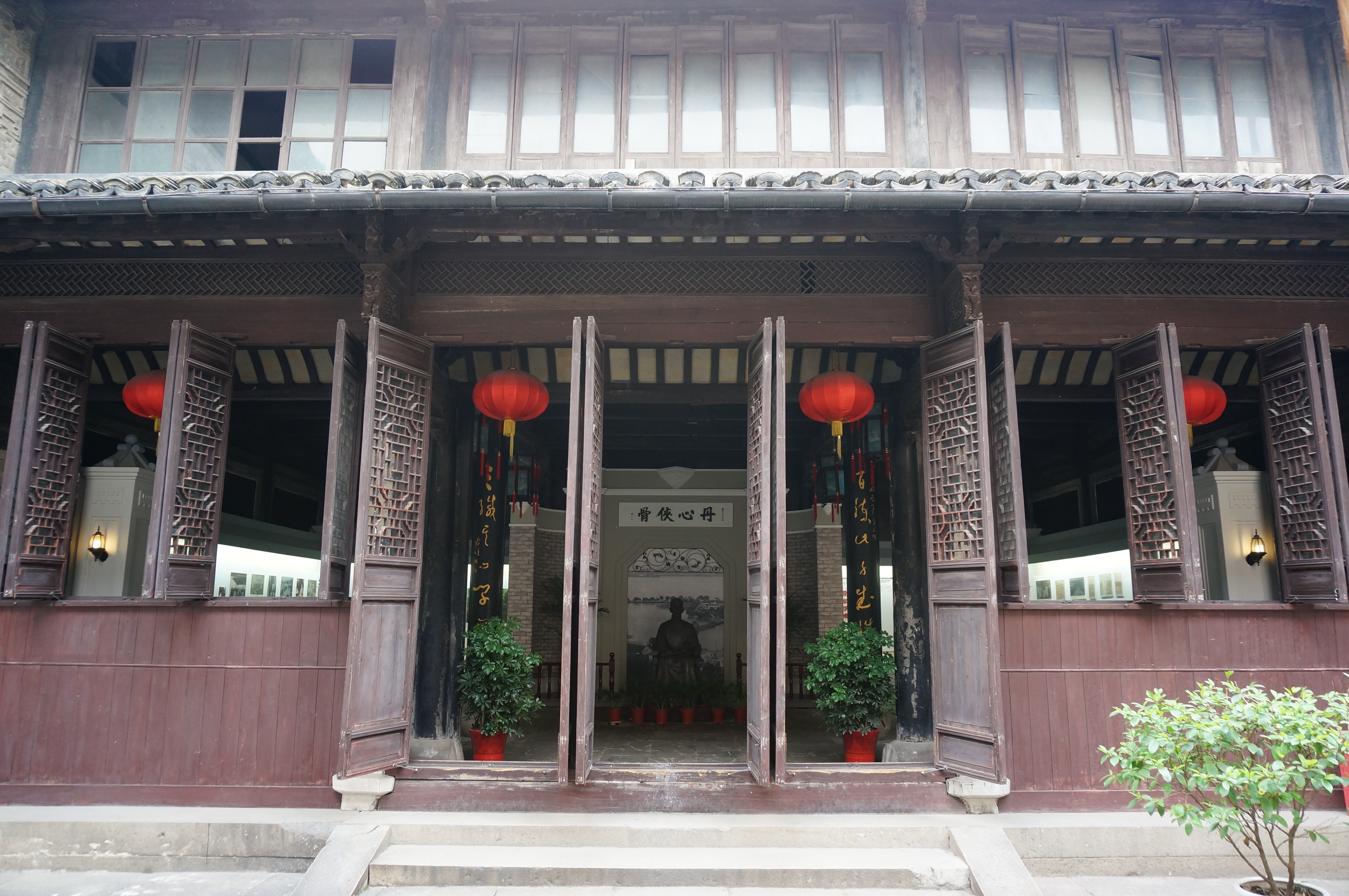
Former Residence of Zhang Shiming.

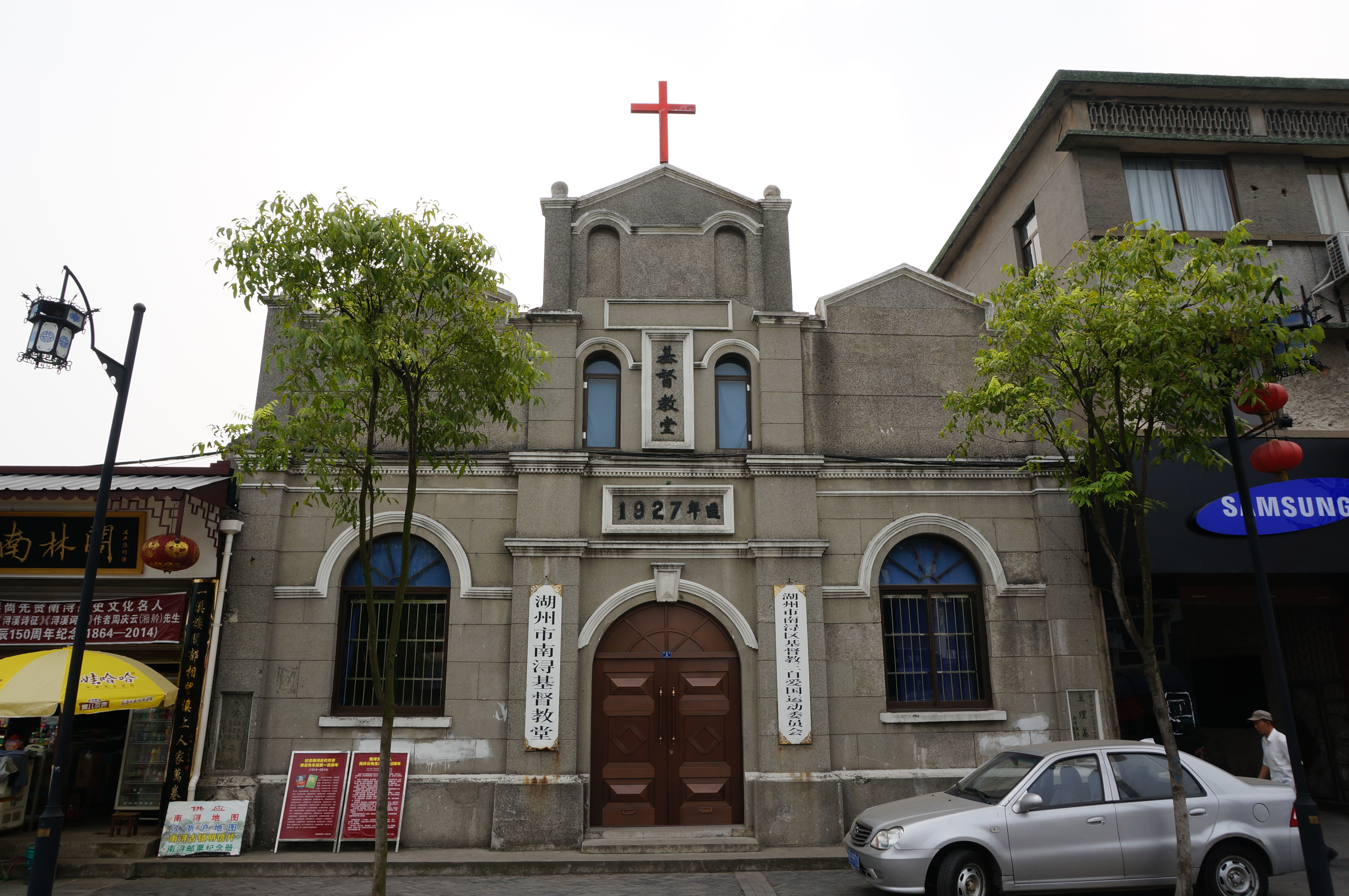
Nanxun Christian Church.

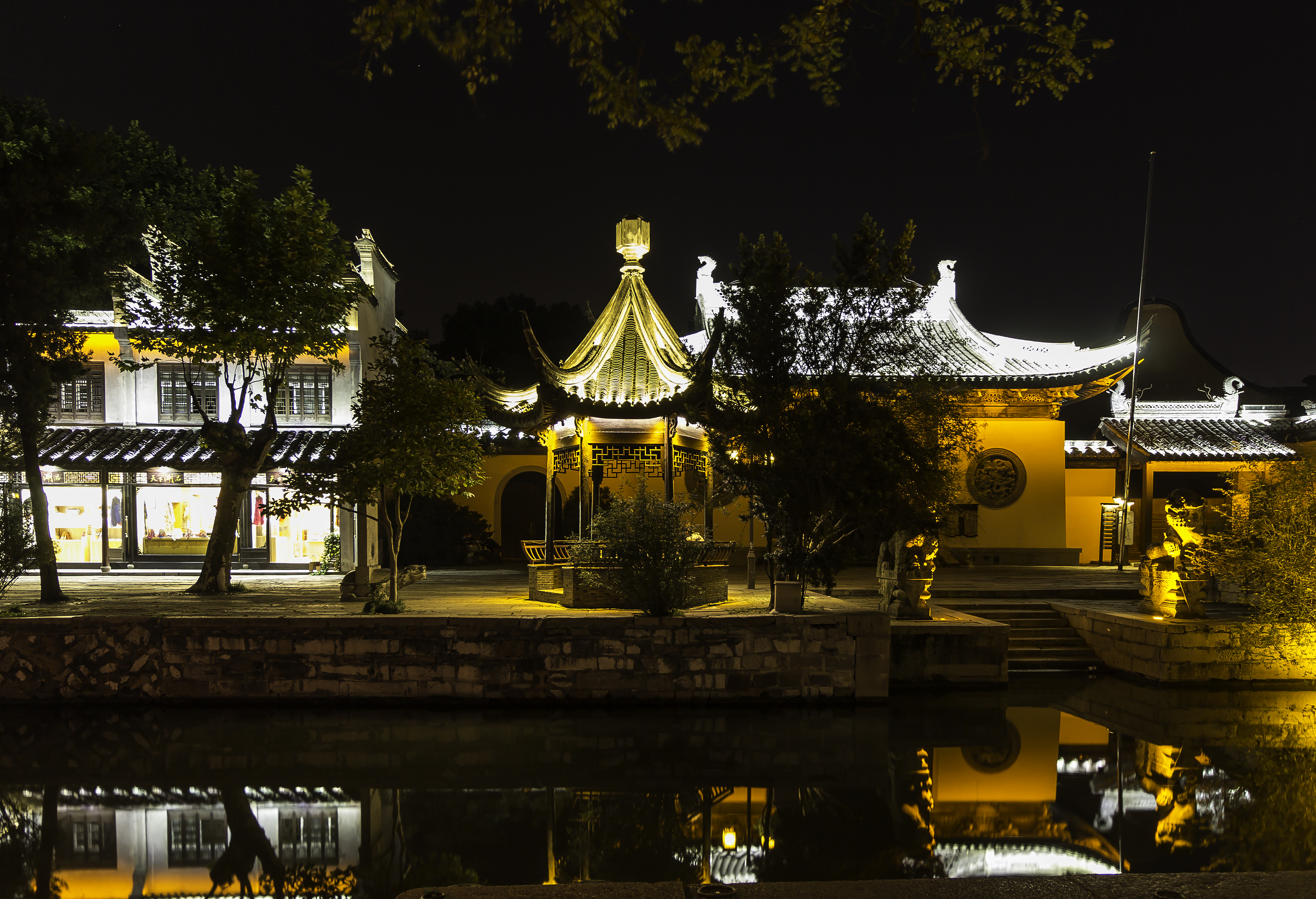
Guanghui Palace.

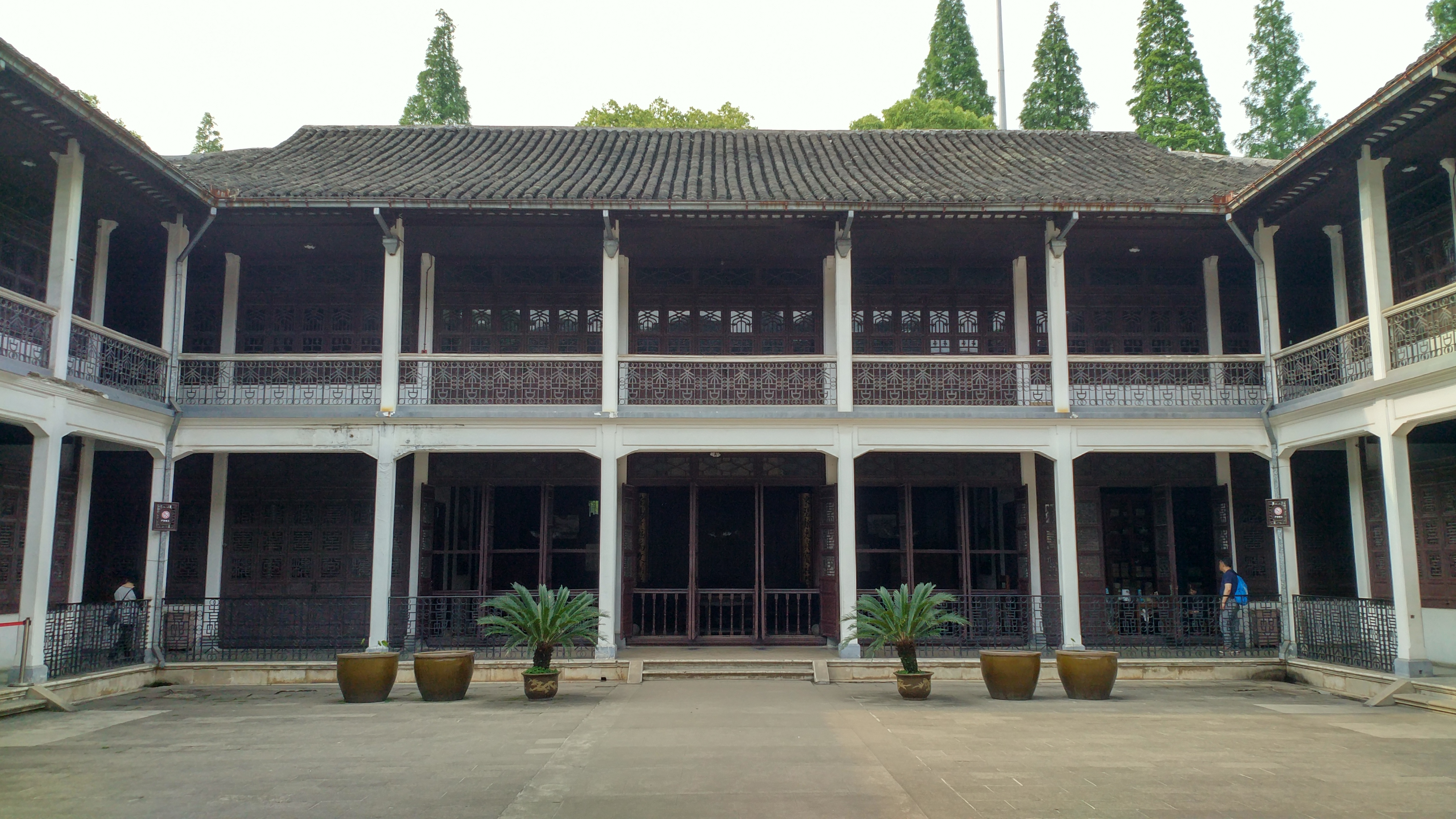
Jiayetang or Jiaye Library.
