= List of bridges in Zhejiang =

The following is a list of bridges in the Zhejiang Providence of China.

== Bridges ==
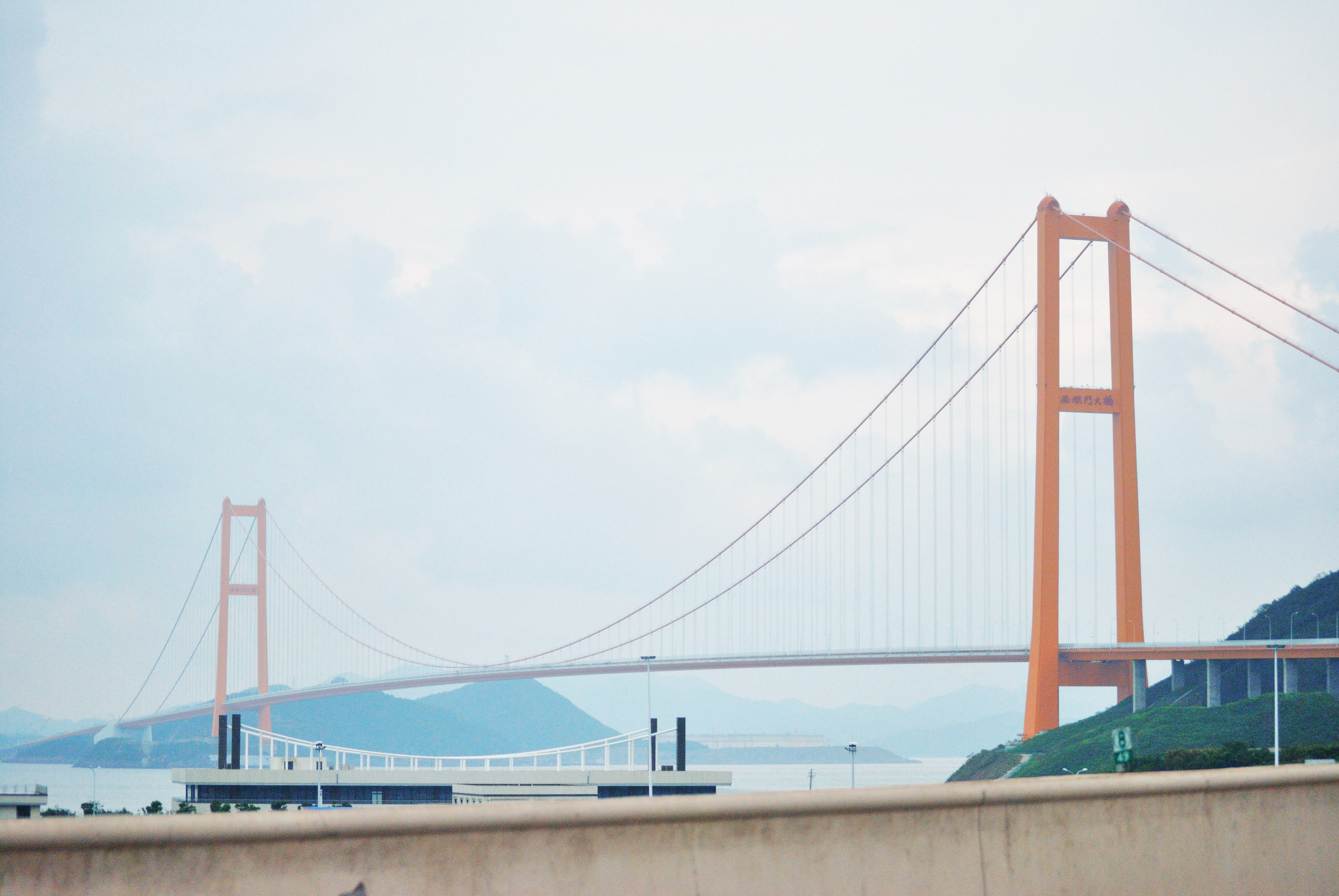
The Xihoumen Bridge, the largest bridge in china

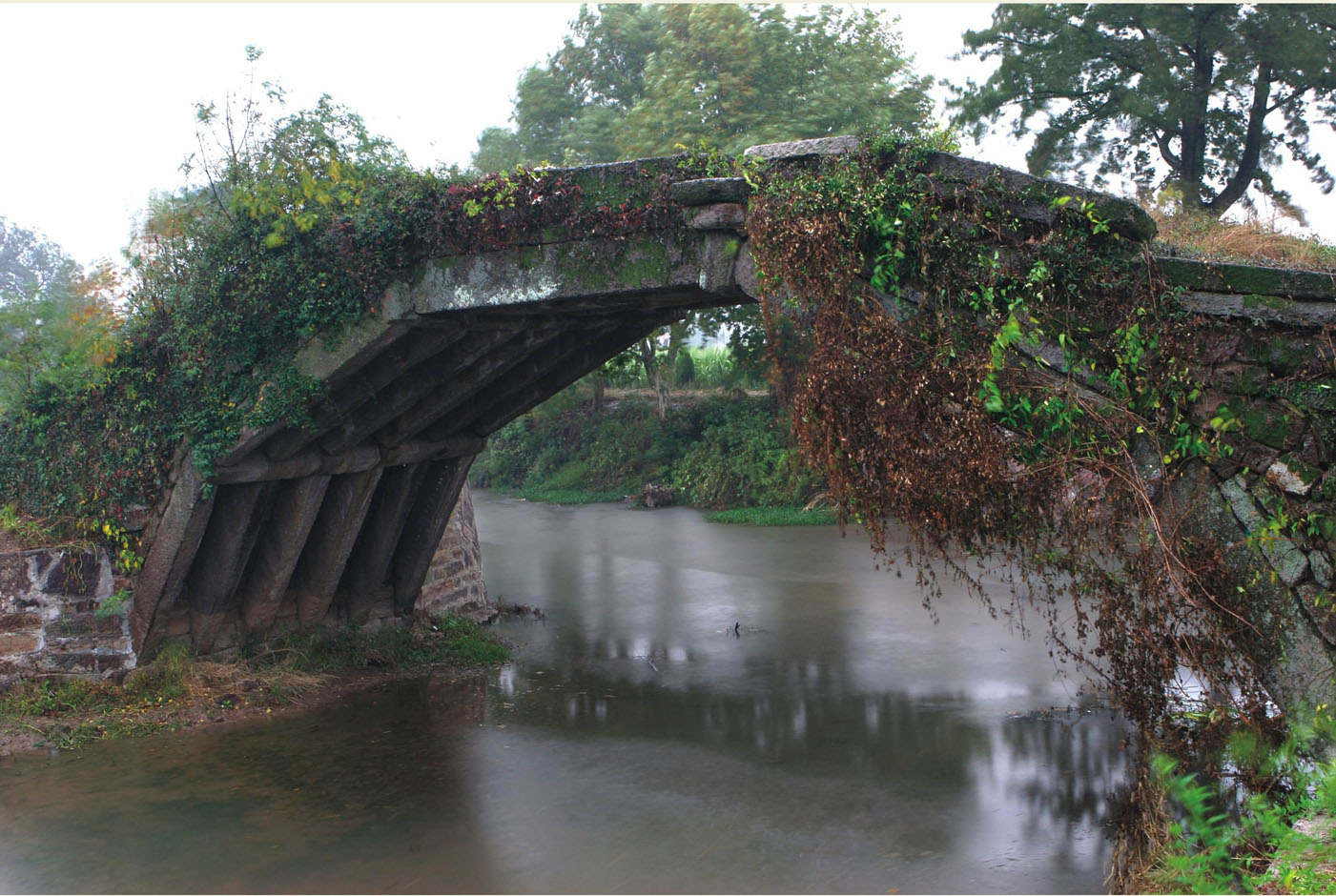
The Guyue Bridge over 800 years old

- Baile Bridge
- Bazi Bridge
- Bei Jian Qiao
- Beijian Bridge
- Beimen Bridge
- Caihong Bridge of Quzhou
- Chaoyin Bridge
- Chien Tang River Bridge
- Chuan Nanpu Bridge
- Dengyun Bridge
- Donghai Bridge
- Dongyang Bridge
- Duan Bridge
- Feiyunjiang Bridge
- Guanghui Bridge
- Guangxiang Bridge
- Guyue Bridge
- Hangzhou Bay Bridge
- Huanxiu Bridge
- Huzhou Anlan Bridge
- Huzhou Luotuo Bridge
- Huzhou Nanxun Old Bridge
- Jiu Shi Qiao
- Jiangdong Bridge
- Jiantiao Bridge
- Jiashao Bridge
- Jintang Bridge
- Jiubao Bridge under construction
- Lanxi Bridge
- Liuzhai Bridge
- Lishui Liandu Zijin Bridge
- Mingzhou Bridge
- Nanyang Bridge
- National Boundaries Bridge
- Ningbo Bailiang Bridge
- Ningbo Guangji Bridge
- Ningbo Tongji Bridge
- Pont de Donghai
- Qiandaohu Bridge
- Qingfeng Bridge
- Qingshuipu Bridge
- Qingyuan Ancient Bridge
- Ruian Dong'an Dong Bridge
- Rulong Bridge
- Ruyi Bridge at Shenxianju
- Santiao Bridge
- Sanzhu Bridge
- Shitu Bridge
- Shouchang Bridge
- Shuxi Bridge
- Stone Bridges of Xinhe
- Taishun Gallery Bridge
- Taishun Sixi Lang Bridge
- Taoyaomen Bridge
- Tishan Bridge
- Tongji Bridge (Jinhua)
- Tongji Bridge (Yuyao)
- Tongjin Bridge
- Tongwamen Bridge
- Waitan Bridge
- Wenxing Bridge
- Wenzhou Sixi East Bridge
- Xiangshan Harbor Bridge
- Xianju Bridge
- Xiasha Bridge
- Xidong Bridge
- Xiaguang Bridge
- Xihoumen Bridge
- Xijin Bridge
- Xuezhai Bridge
- Yinggangdian Bridge
- Yinjiang Bridge
- Yongkang Xijin Bridge
- Yongqing Bridge
- Yonghe Bridge
- Yuwen Bridge
- Zhaobaoshan Bridge
- Zhoushan Kuahai Bridge

== See also ==
- List of bridges in China
