= Jiayetang =

Library in Huzhou, China

Jiayetang (Chinese: 嘉業堂) is a library and book publisher in Nanxun District, Huzhou, Zhejiang, China. It was established by a local gentry Liu Chenggan (1881–1963) in the 1920s. It was built next to the Lesser Lotus Manor. Previously, the library was also a bookstore.

== History ==
Jiayetang's founder Liu Chenggan was a bibliophile from a wealthy banker family of Huzhou. Chenggan invested a tremendous amount of money collecting rare publications from different dynasties of China.

Jiayetang, at its peak, included parts of the Yongle Encyclopedia and drafts of Siku Quanshu. Among its collections were the Song dynasty version of the Early Four Historiographies (Shiji, Han Shu, Hou Hanshu and Sanguo Zhi).

In 1950, after the communist revolution, the library was specifically protected due to its value. Jiayetang's unique documents concerning Sino-Indian borders were later used as strategic resources during the Sino-Indian War of 1962.

Currently, Jiayetang possesses over 150,000 woodcut plates originally used for book publication. It receives the financial support from the government of Zhejiang province and is continuing its function.

== Photo gallery ==
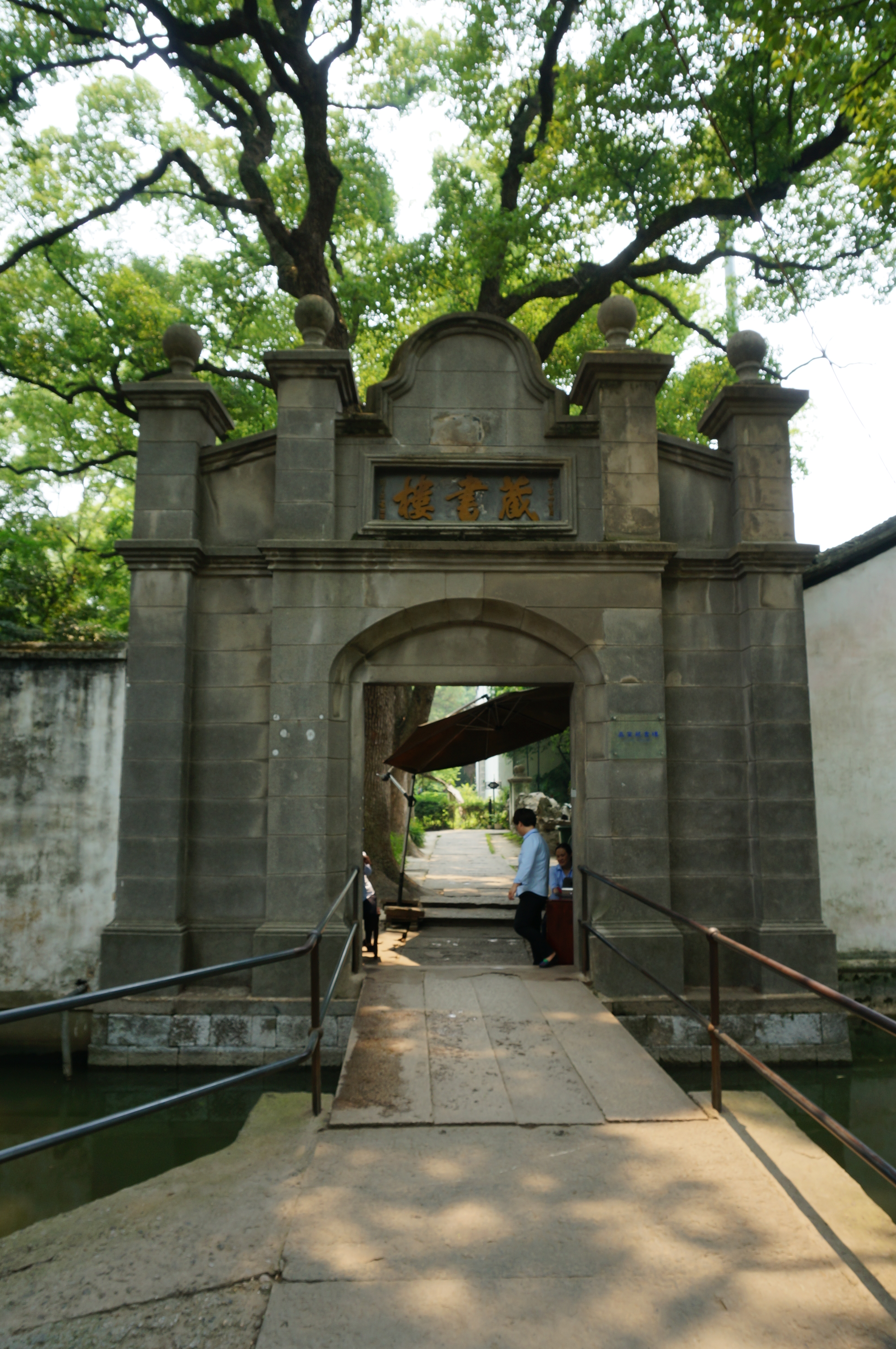
Front gate

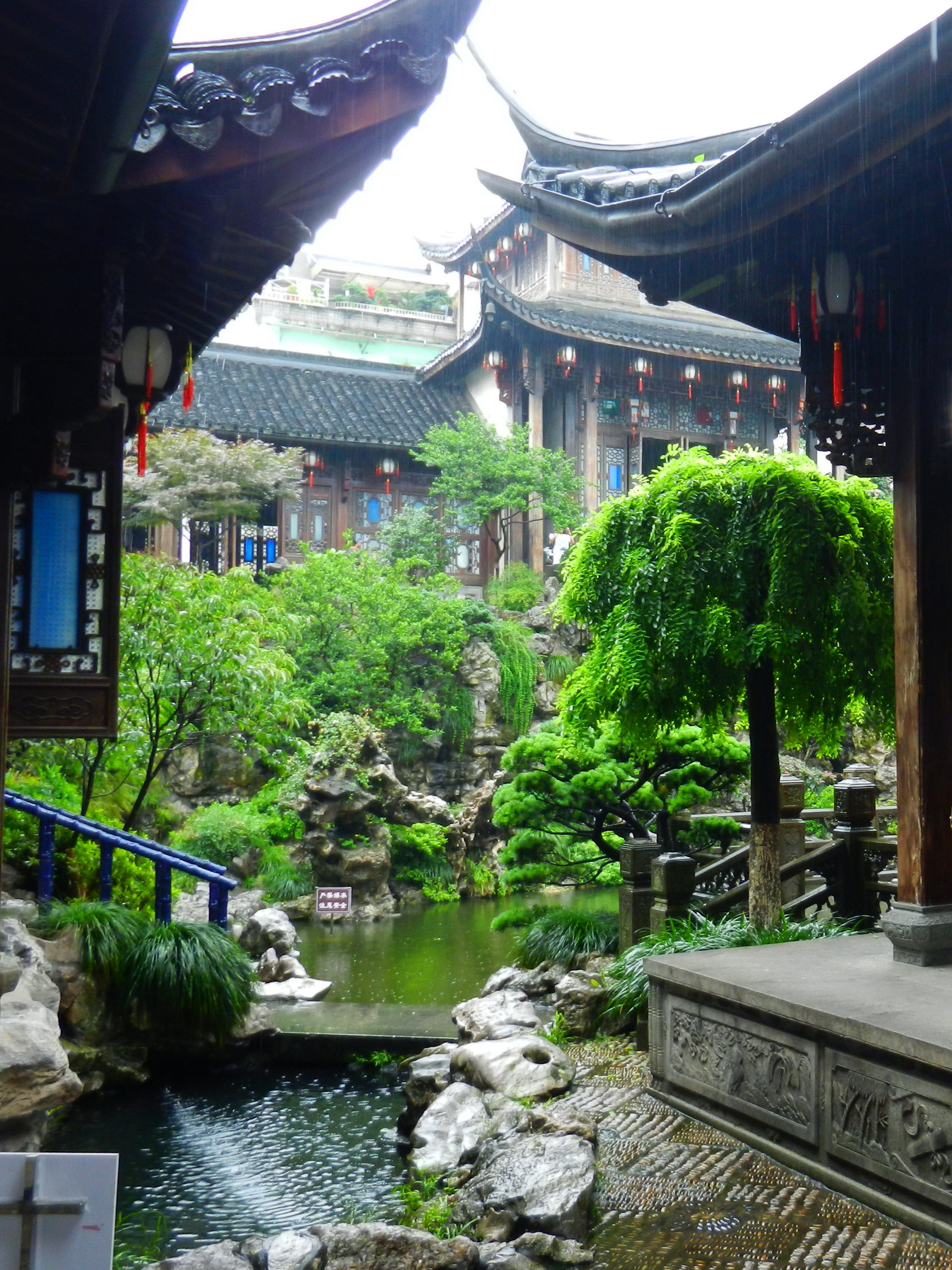
A view inside the library

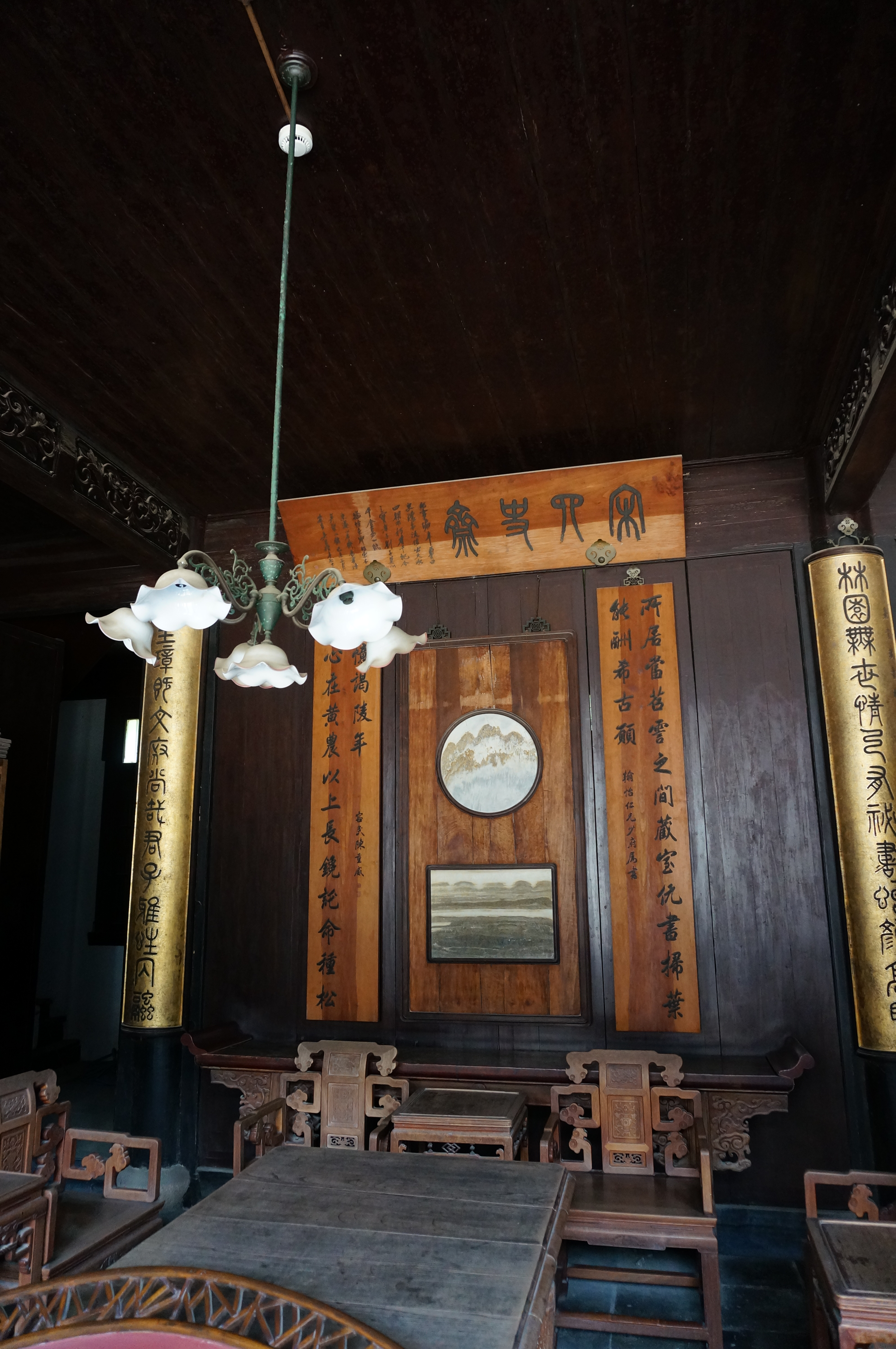
Song Sishi Zhai

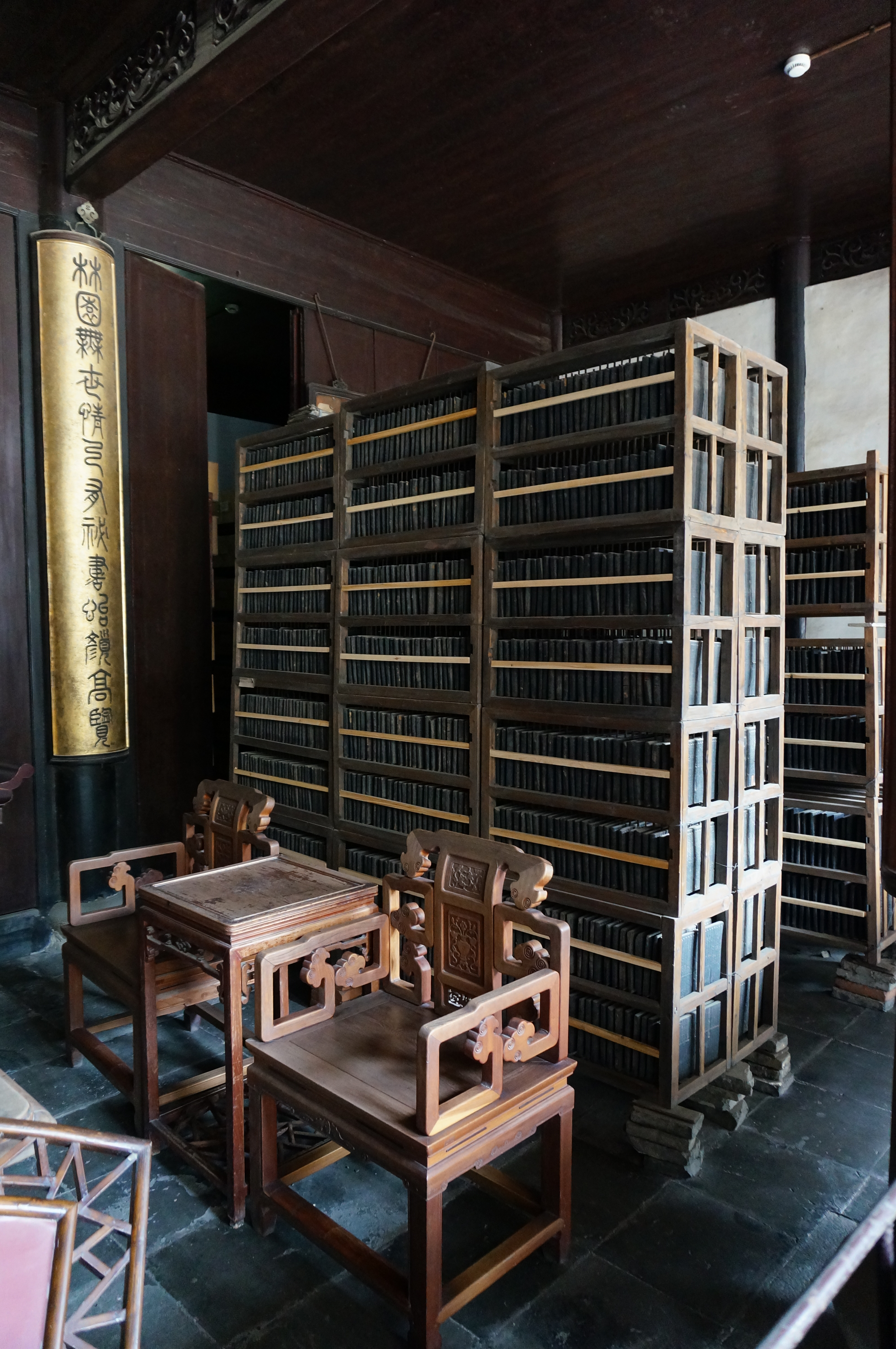
Woodcut plates used to publish traditional style Chinese books

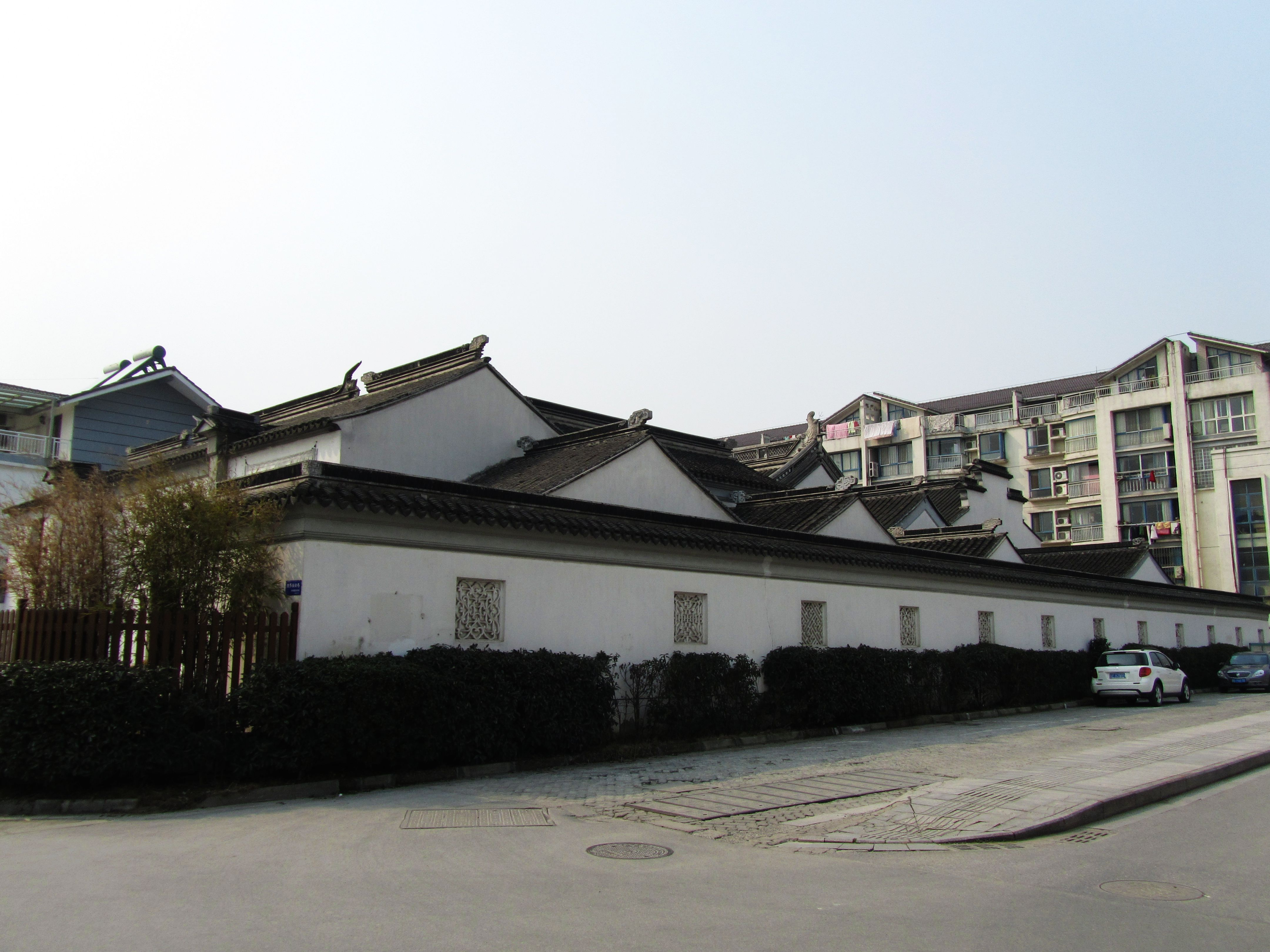
A view from outside

== See also ==
- List of libraries in China
