= Former Residence of Zhang Shiming =

- 张石铭旧居
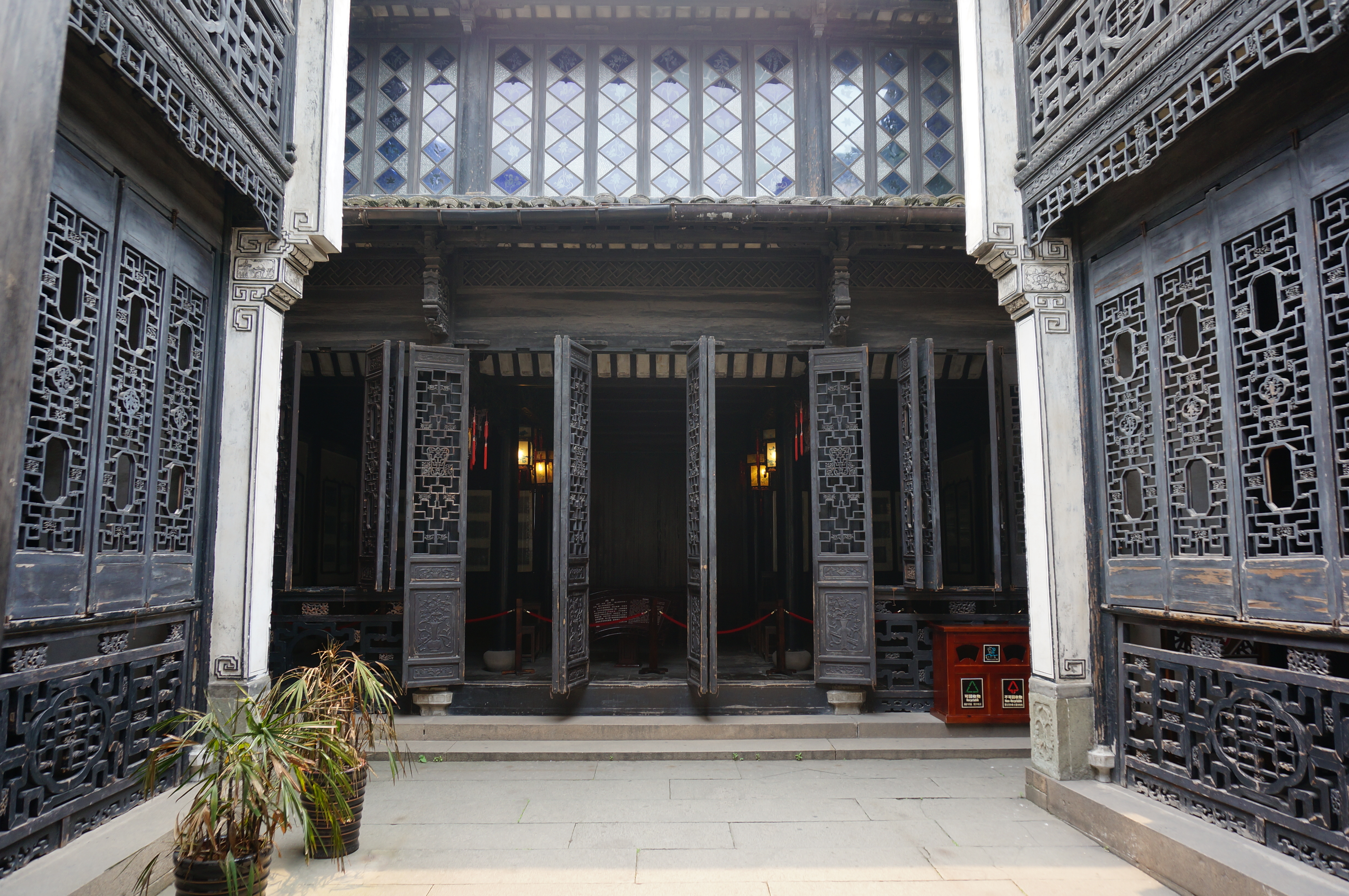
- The third room.

- Location within Zhejiang

General information
- Type: Traditional folk houses
- Location: Nanxun, Huzhou, Zhejiang, China
- Coordinates: 30°52′24.39″N 120°25′35.5″E
- Groundbreaking: 1899
- Completed: 1905

Height
- Architectural: Chinese architecture

Technical details
- Material: Wood and bricks
- Floor area: 6,137 m^{2} (66,060 sq ft)

Design and construction
- Architect: Zhang Junheng

The Former Residence of Zhang Shiming (simplified Chinese: 张石铭旧居; traditional Chinese: 張石銘舊居; pinyin: Zhāng Shímíng Jiùjū), also known as Hall of Yide (Chinese: 懿德堂; lit. 'Hall of Virtue') is located in Nanxun, Huzhou, Zhejiang, China. It was the former residence of Zhang Shiming, grandson of Zhang Songxian (张颂贤).

== History ==
It was built between 1899 and 1905, during the ruling of Guangxu Emperor in late Qing dynasty (1644–1911).

In 2001, it was inscribed to the fifth batch of "Major National Historical and Cultural Sites in Zhejiang" by the State Council of China.

== Architecture ==
It covers a building area of 6,137-square-metre (66,060 sq ft) and consists of 244 rooms. It is influenced by the architecture style of Renaissance architecture in the Western Europe and at the same time preserves the basic form of the residential houses in Jiangnan region.
