= Shanlian =

Town in Zhejiang, China

Shanlian 善琏
- Town
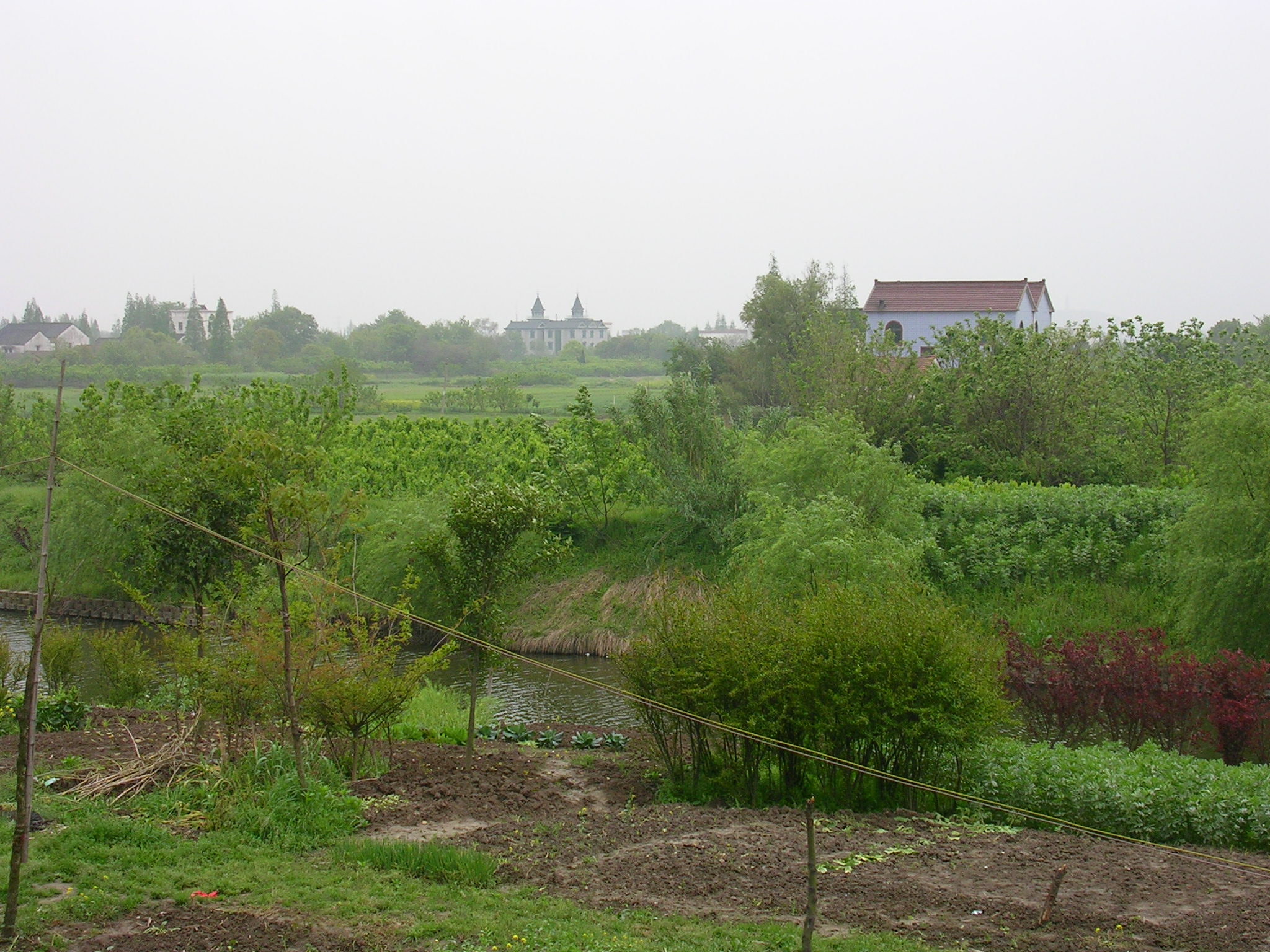
- Interactive map of Shanlian
- Coordinates: 30°41′56″N 120°18′34″E
- Country: China
- Province: Zhejiang
- District: Nanxun District

Population (2007)
  - Total: 28,400

Shanlian (Chinese: 善琏) is a small town located in northern Zhejiang province in China, in the Nanxun District of the prefecture-level city Huzhou. It is renowned as the sole source of the prized Huzhou writing brush, which has been manufactured in the town for over 2,000 years.

An extensive canal system criss-crosses the town, and a good deal of agriculture is done in the outlying areas surrounding the town. In addition there are extensive groves of mulberry bushes grown throughout the district for silk production. The land upon which the town is built is made up of very gentle, rolling fields, and the climate is quite temperate - snow in the winter is possible but rare. Agriculture is possible nearly the whole year round.

As of 2008, a large new Buddhist temple is currently under construction next door to the old temple. It is planned to eventually include the old temple grounds. The east side of town has been experiencing significant growth for several years now, while the older, western part of town is very gradually being abandoned.

== Image gallery ==
View of ShanLian

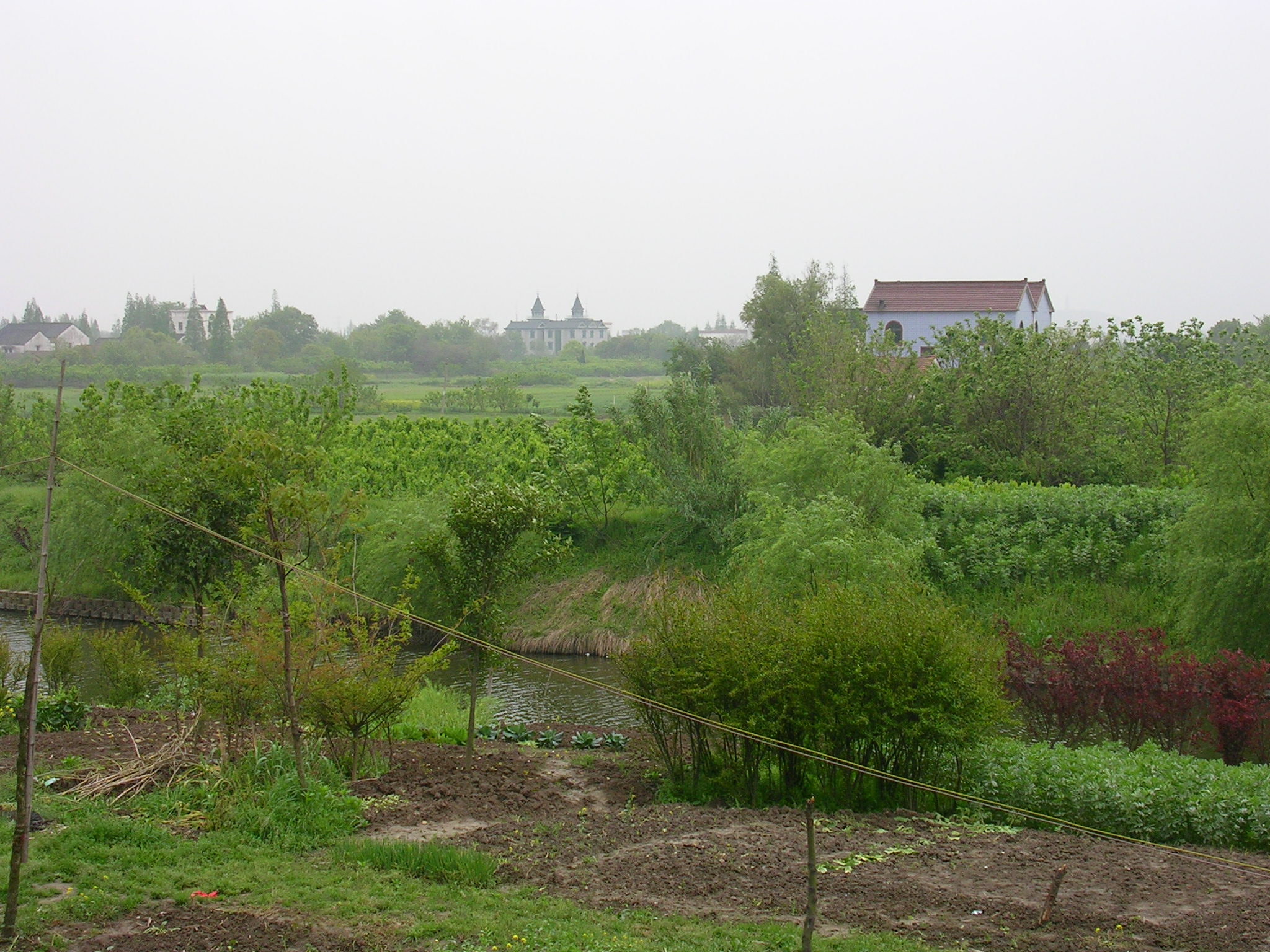
East end of town looking south
