= Former Residence of Zhang Jingjiang =

- 张静江故居
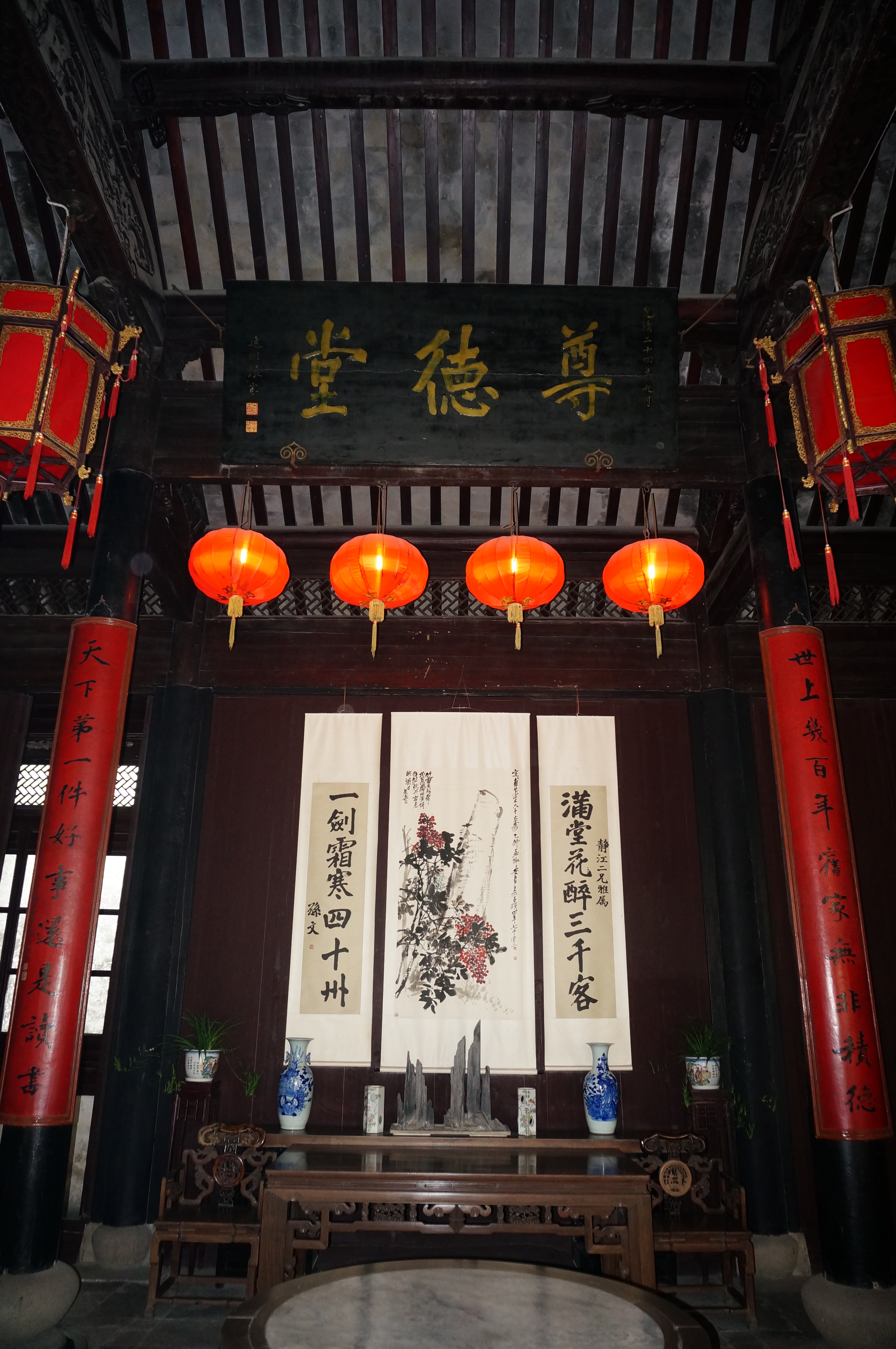
- The first room.

- Location within Zhejiang

General information
- Type: Traditional folk houses
- Location: Nanxun, Huzhou, Zhejiang, China
- Coordinates: 30°52′55.11″N 120°25′44.74″E
- Groundbreaking: 1898
- Completed: 1898

Height
- Architectural: Chinese architecture

Technical details
- Material: Wood and bricks
- Floor area: 2,364 m^{2} (25,450 sq ft)

Design and construction
- Architect: Zhang Songxian

The Former Residence of Zhang Jingjiang (simplified Chinese: 张静江故居; traditional Chinese: 張靜江故居; pinyin: Zhāng Jìngjiāng Gùjū), also known as Hall of Zunde (Chinese: 尊德堂; lit. 'Hall of Respecting Moral Character'), is the birthplace and former residence of Zhang Jingjiang, one of the "Four Elder Statesmen" of the Kuomintang.

== History ==
The Former Residence of Zhang Jingjiang was built by Zhang Songxian (Chinese: 张颂贤), the grandfather of Zhang Jingjiang, in 1898, during the region of Guangxu Emperor in late Qing dynasty (1644–1911).

In March 2013, it was designated as a Major National Historical and Cultural Site by the State Council of China.

== Architecture ==
The house comprise 7 rooms. Some wooden plaques with couplets written by Zhang Jian, Sun Yat-sen, Tan Yankai, Weng Tonghe and Chen Lifu are hung on the pillars of the house.
