= Water towns =

Historic Chinese town defined by its waterways

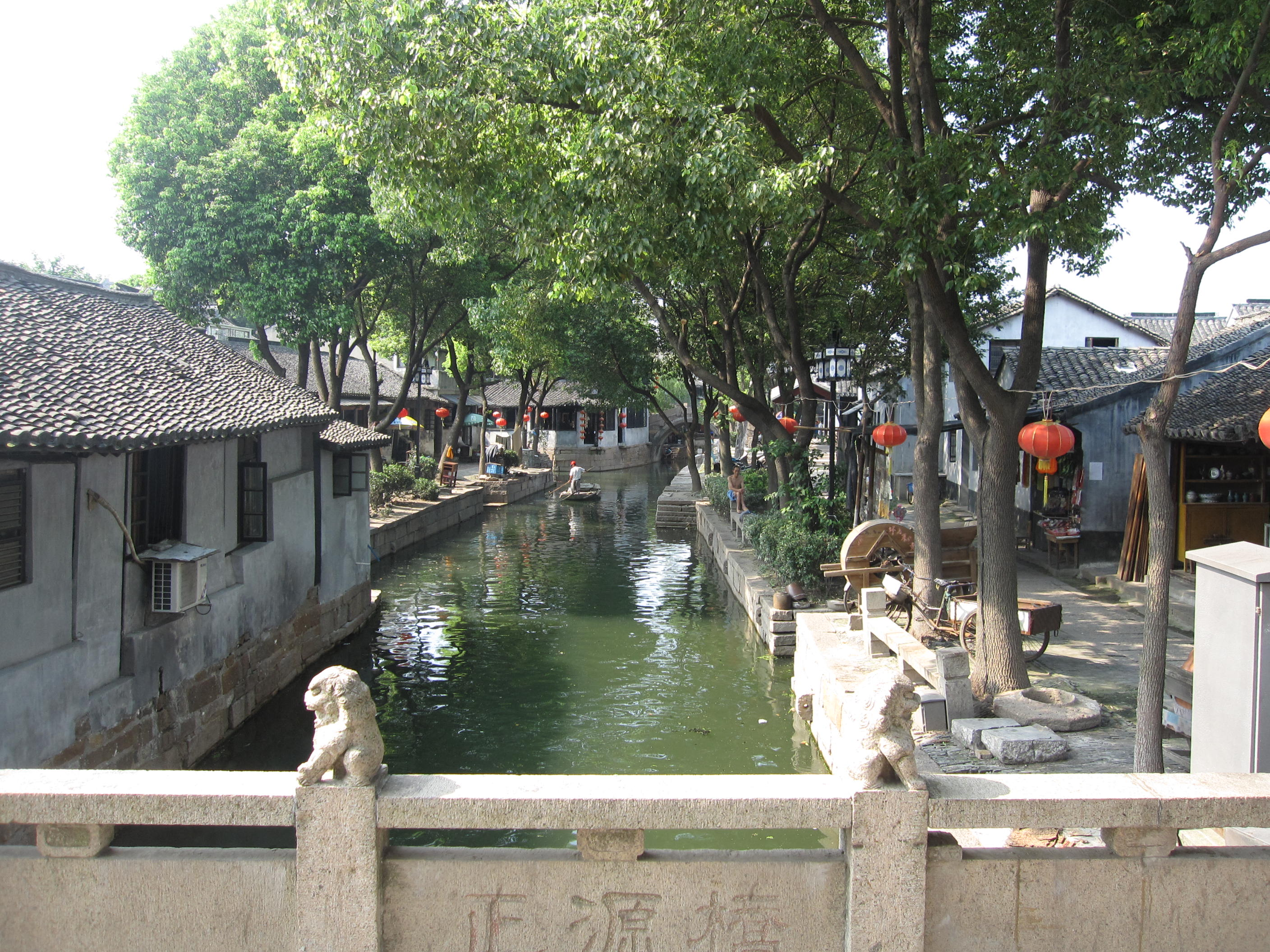
Luzhi

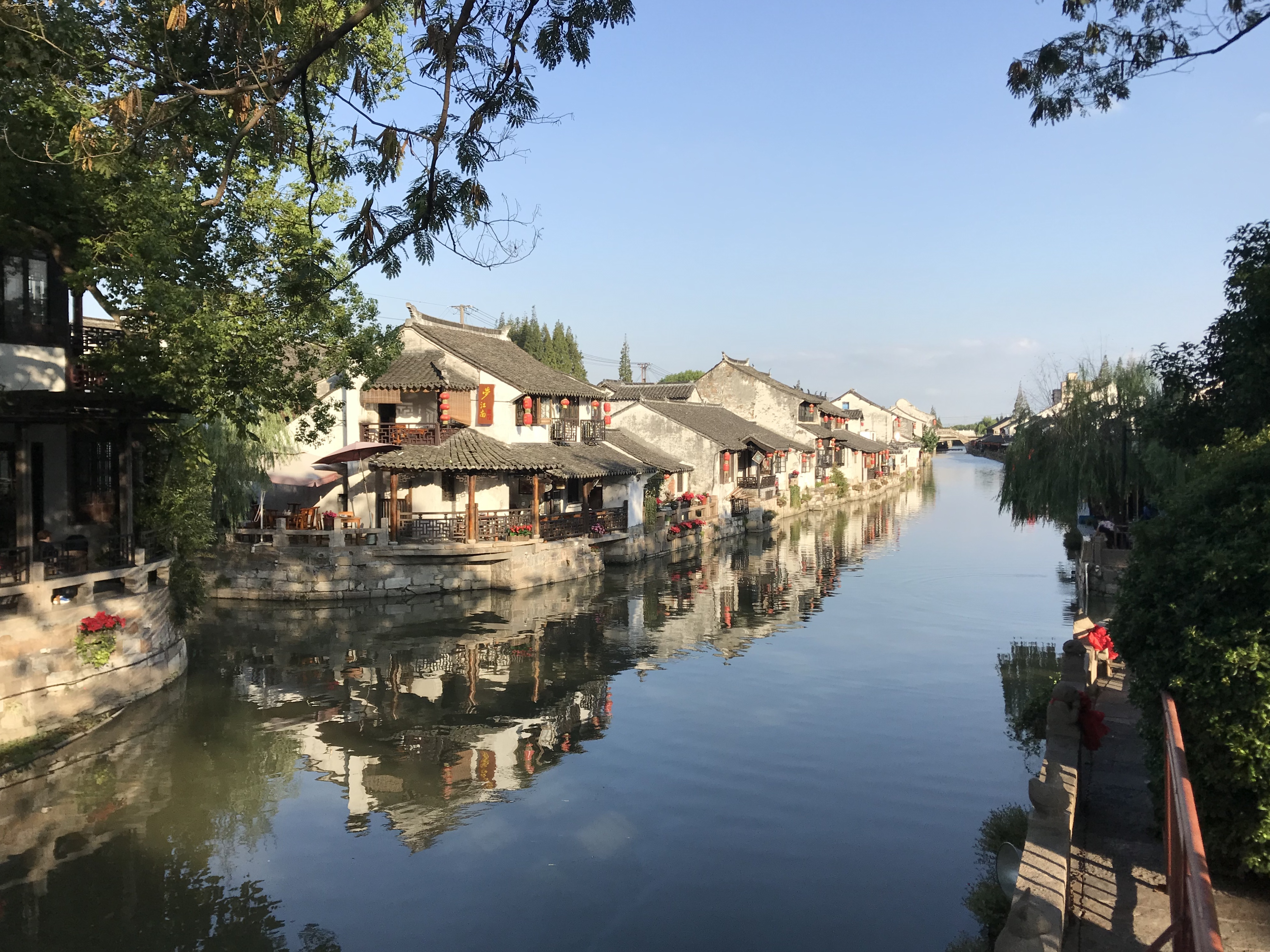
Fengjing

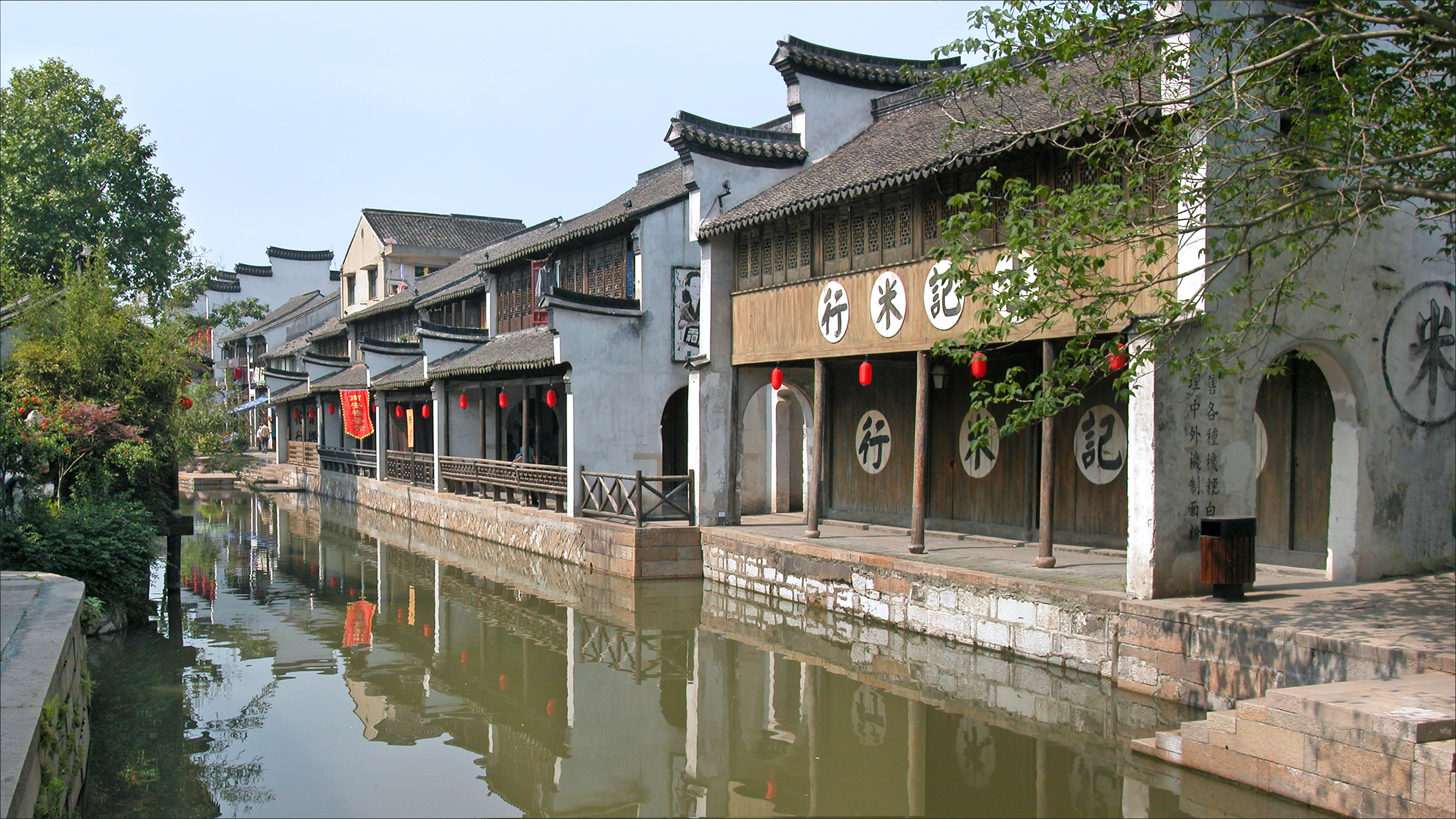
Nanxun

Water towns, also called canal towns (水乡), are certain ancient and historic towns in China known for their bridges, rivers, and canals. Such towns exist in many regions of China, although those in Jiangsu and Zhejiang provinces are often the most renowned.

Canal towns are generally concentrated in the Jiangnan area which includes the Jiangsu province, Zhejiang province, and Shanghai area. They are located towards the south of the Yangtze River. These river-based settlements are widely advertised as tourism destinations because of their historical and cultural representations of China. The idyllic small-town setting, which demonstrates the harmonious relationship between nature and its residents, is also another attractive factor.

The distribution of residential buildings in these water towns can be categorised into three types: against the water, by the water, and across the water. They are usually characterised by some of the traditional architectural features, including eaves gallery and patio.

Besides these vernacular dwellings, more contemporary structures also have begun to emerge in recent years due to the continual growth of tourism. Effectively integrating the modern and traditional is currently one of the main priorities of the local governments in some of the water towns.

Although some cities in Jiangnan such as Suzhou and Shaoxing have canals and bridges, they are not characterised as water towns as they are geographically larger. As a result, they are categorised as cities.

== Notable towns ==
Zhejiang:

- Anchang, Shaoxing
- Cicheng, Ningbo
- Nanxun, Huzhou
- Wuzhen, Jiaxing
- Xinshi, Huzhou
- Xitang, Jiaxing

Shanghai:

- Fengjing
- Qibao
- Zhujiajiao

Jiangsu:

- Bacheng, Kunshan
- Jinxi, Kunshan
- Luzhi, Suzhou
- Mudu, Suzhou
- Qiandeng, Kunshan
- Shuangfeng, Taicang
- Tongli, Suzhou
- Zhouzhuang, Kunshan

== See also ==
- Venice of the East
