= Nanxun Christian Church =

- 南浔基督教堂
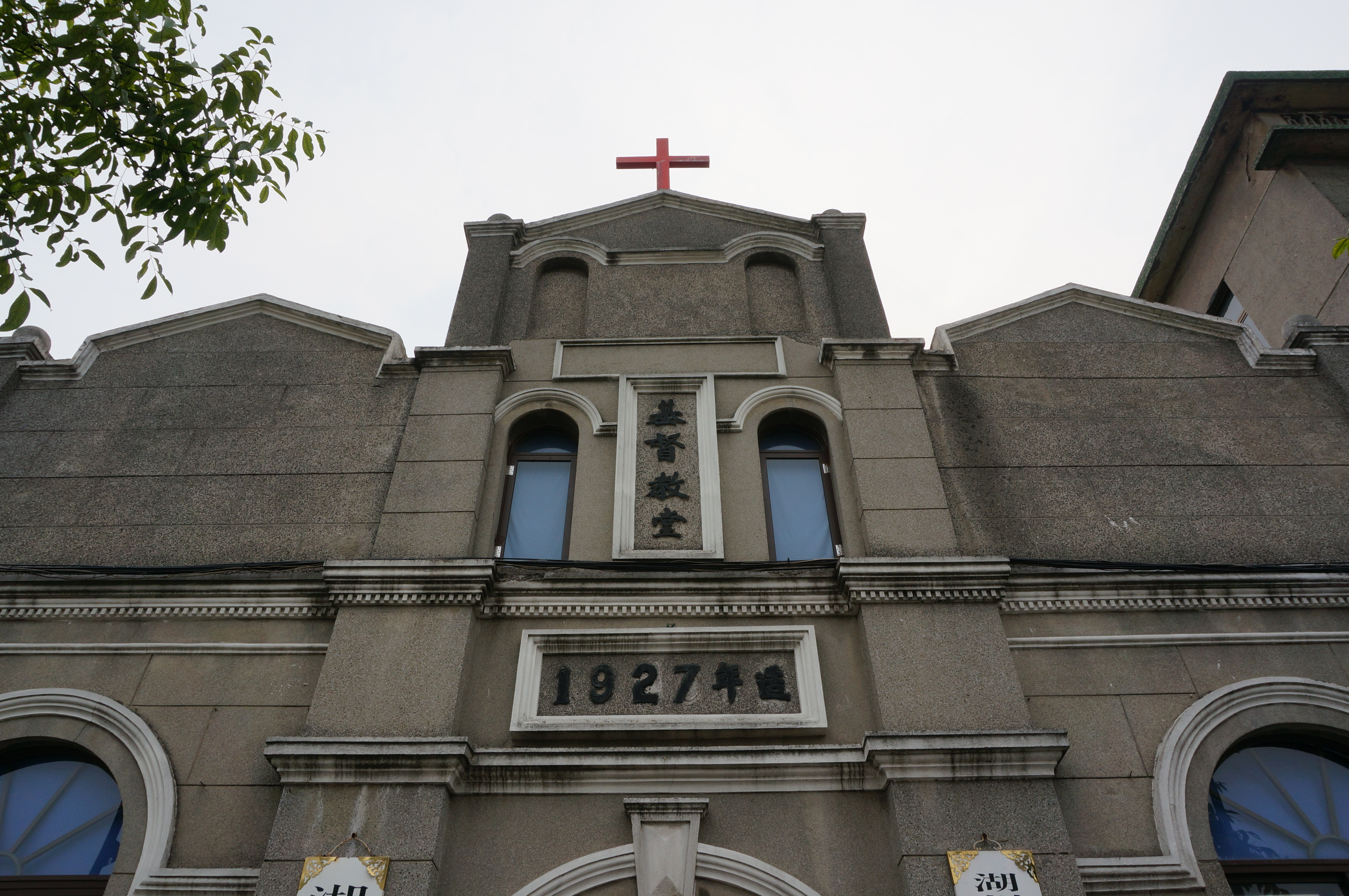
- Frontal view of Nanxun Christian Church.

- Location within Zhejiang
- 30°44′57″N 120°22′17″E
- Location: Nanxun District, Huzhou, Zhejiang
- Country: China
- Denomination: Protestantism

History
- Founder: Slote

Architecture
- Functional status: Active
- Architectural type: Church building
- Style: Modern
- Years built: 1927
- Construction cost: USD$ 30 million

Specifications
- Materials: Bricks and granite

Nanxun Christian Church (simplified Chinese: 南浔基督教堂; traditional Chinese: 南潯基督教堂; pinyin: Nánxún Jīdū Jiàotáng) is a Protestant church located in Nanxun District of Huzhou, Zhejiang, China.

== History ==
The introduction of Christianity into the Nanxun area began in 1860, belonging to the American Methodist Episcopal Mission.

In 1927, American Christian Slote appropriated US$30 million for building the Church. It was named Slote Church in memory of her after completion. Yu Zhizhai (俞志斋) was the first rectorship and Tang Musan (唐沐三) was the first archpriest.

After the defeat of the Nationalists by the Chinese Communist Party in Chinese Civil War in 1949, Nanxun Christian Church under the jurisdiction of the government. Religious activities had been forced to stop in the following year. In 1958 the Church was used as residential building for locals.

In 1966, Mao Zedong launched the ten-year Cultural Revolution, the Red Guards attacked the Church. It was spared destruction and was boarded up till 1986.

After the 3rd Plenary Session of the 11th Central Committee of the Chinese Communist Party, a policy of some religious freedom was implemented in 1986. On 29 March 1987, the Church held the first Sunday Services since 1950. In December that same year, Lü Haisheng (吕海生) was proposed as the new director of its Management Committee. In October 1992, Wang Jinkang (王金康) replaced Lü Haisheng as the second director.

== Gallery ==
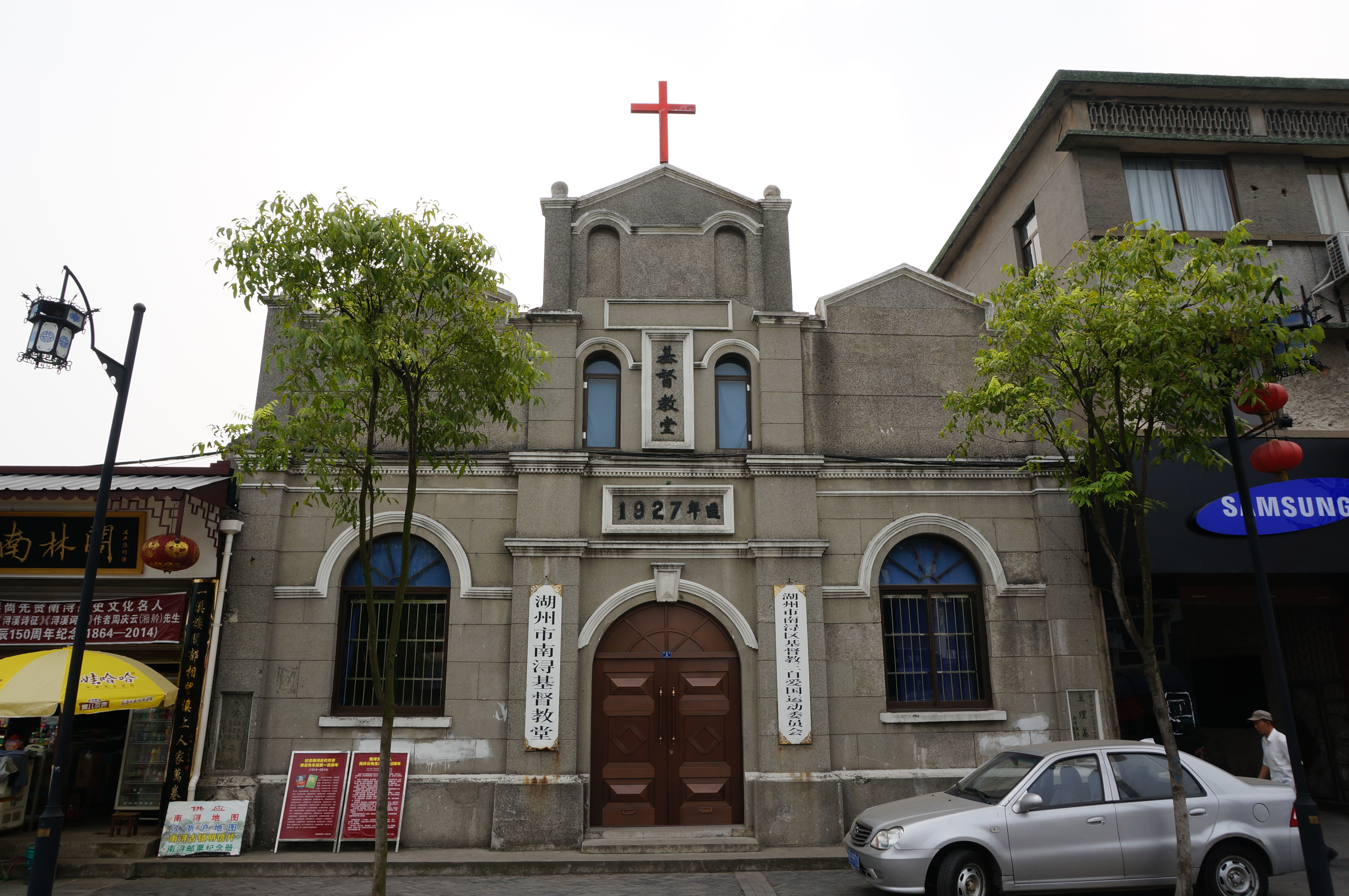
Frontal view of Nanxun Christian Church.

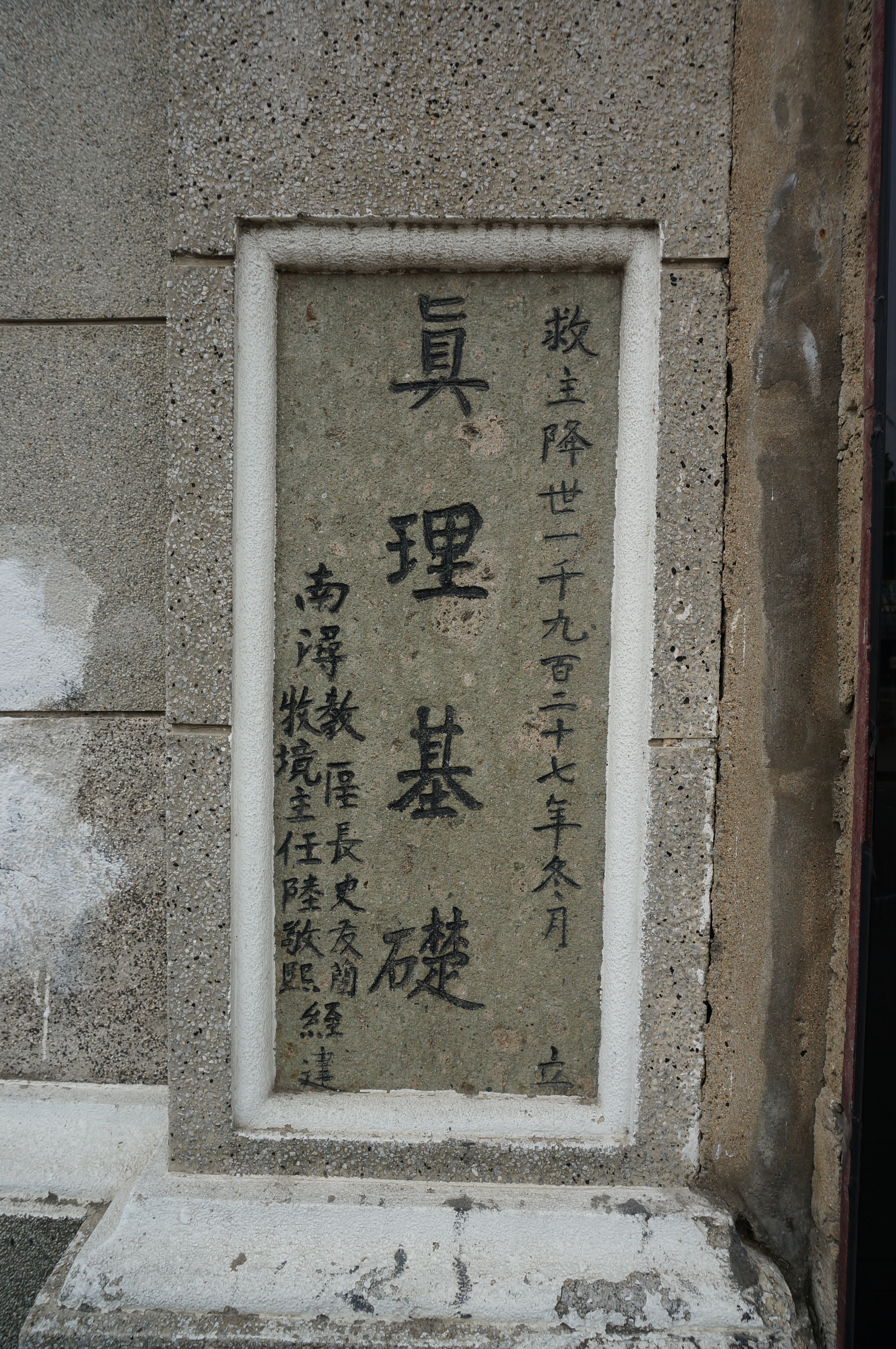
Cornerstone.
