= Guanghui Bridge =

Guanghui Bridge 广惠桥
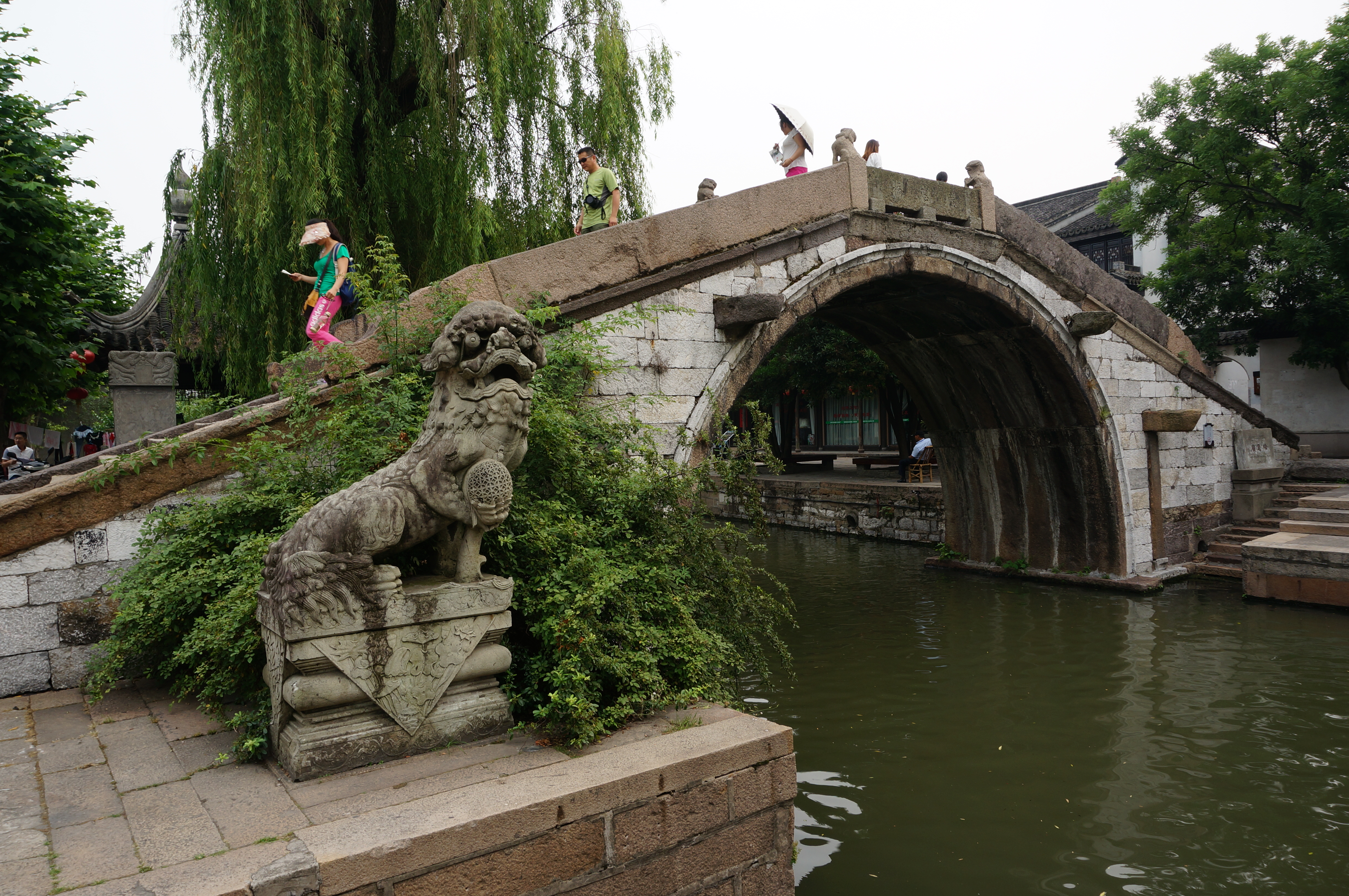
- Guanghui Bridge in June 2014.
- Coordinates: 30°52′36.12″N 120°25′33.96″E
- Crosses: Nanshi River
- Locale: Nanxun, Huzhou, Zhejiang, China

Characteristics
- Design: Arch Bridge
- Material: Stone
- Total length: 18 metres (59 ft)
- Width: 3.3 metres (11 ft)
- Height: 5.3 metres (17 ft)

History
- Construction start: 1800 (reconstruction)
- Construction end: 1800 (reconstruction)
- Opened: 1800

The Guanghui Bridge (simplified Chinese: 广惠桥; traditional Chinese: 廣惠橋; pinyin: Guǎnghuì Qiáo) is a historic stone arch bridge over the Nanshi River in Nanxun, Huzhou, Zhejiang, China. In is backed by the Taoist temple Guanghui Palace.

== History ==
The current bridge was rebuilt in 1800, in the 5th year of Jiaqing period of the Qing dynasty (1644–1911). It was renovated in 1866, in the reign of Tongzhi Emperor.

In March 1989, it was inscribed as a municipal cultural preservation unit by the Huzhou Municipal Government.

== Architecture ==
The bridge measures 18 metres (59 ft) long, 3.3 metres (11 ft) wide, and approximately 5.3 metres (17 ft) high.
