= Hongji Bridge =

Hongji Bridge 洪济桥
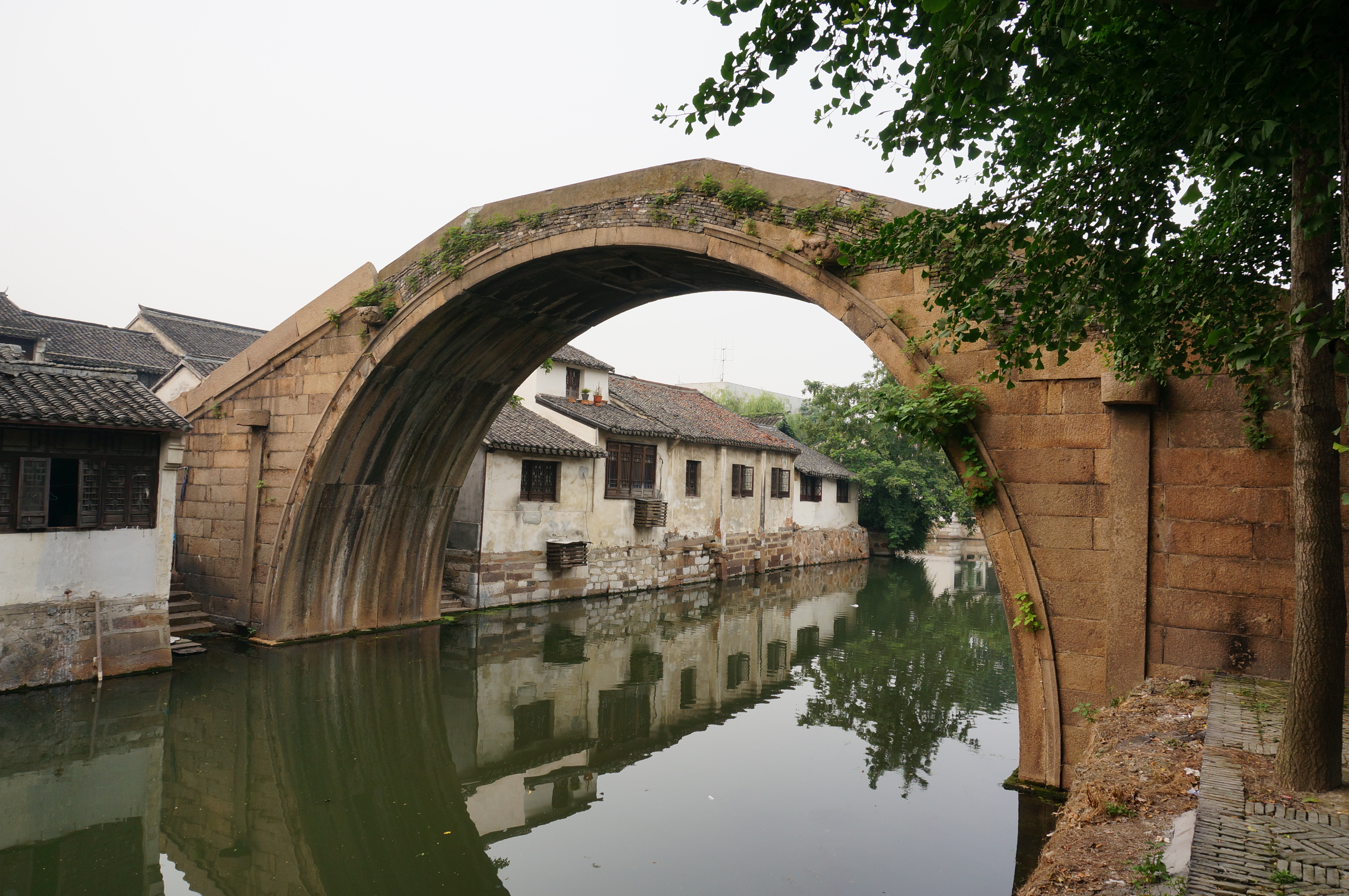
- Hongji Bridge in June 2014.
- Coordinates: 30°52′51.96″N 120°25′41.16″E
- Crosses: Dongshi River
- Locale: Nanxun, Huzhou, Zhejiang, China

Characteristics
- Design: Arch Bridge
- Material: Stone
- Total length: 28 metres (92 ft)
- Width: 3.5 metres (11 ft)
- Height: 7.2 metres (24 ft)

History
- Construction start: 1805
- Construction end: 1805
- Opened: 1805

The Hongji Bridge (simplified Chinese: 洪济桥; traditional Chinese: 洪濟橋; pinyin: Hóngjì Qiáo) is a historic stone arch bridge over the Dongshi River in Nanxun, Huzhou, Zhejiang, China.

== History ==
The bridge was first mentioned in the Prefecture Topography of Huzhou (Chinese: 湖州府志) during the reign of Wanli Emperor in the Ming dynasty (1368–1644). In 1805, in the ruling of Jiaqing Emperor of the Qing dynasty (1644–1911), it was rebuilt by local people. On November 15, 1937, in order to stop the attack of the Imperial Japanese Army, the National Army blew up part of the bridge deck.

== Architecture ==
The bridge measures 28 metres (92 ft) long, 3.5 metres (11 ft) wide, and approximately 7.2 metres (24 ft) high.
