= Nanxun, Huzhou =

Nanxun 南浔区
- District
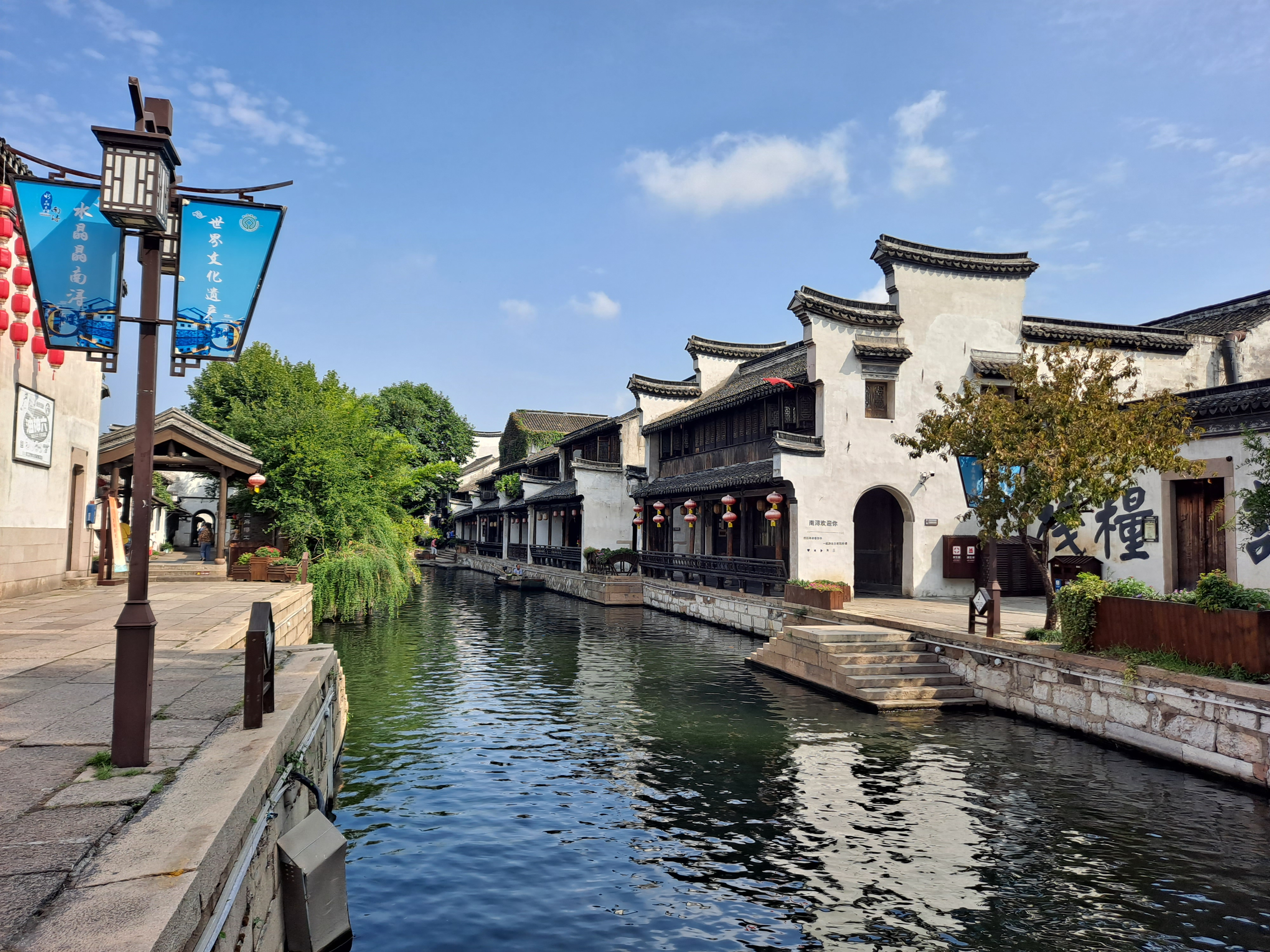
- Nanxun's canal

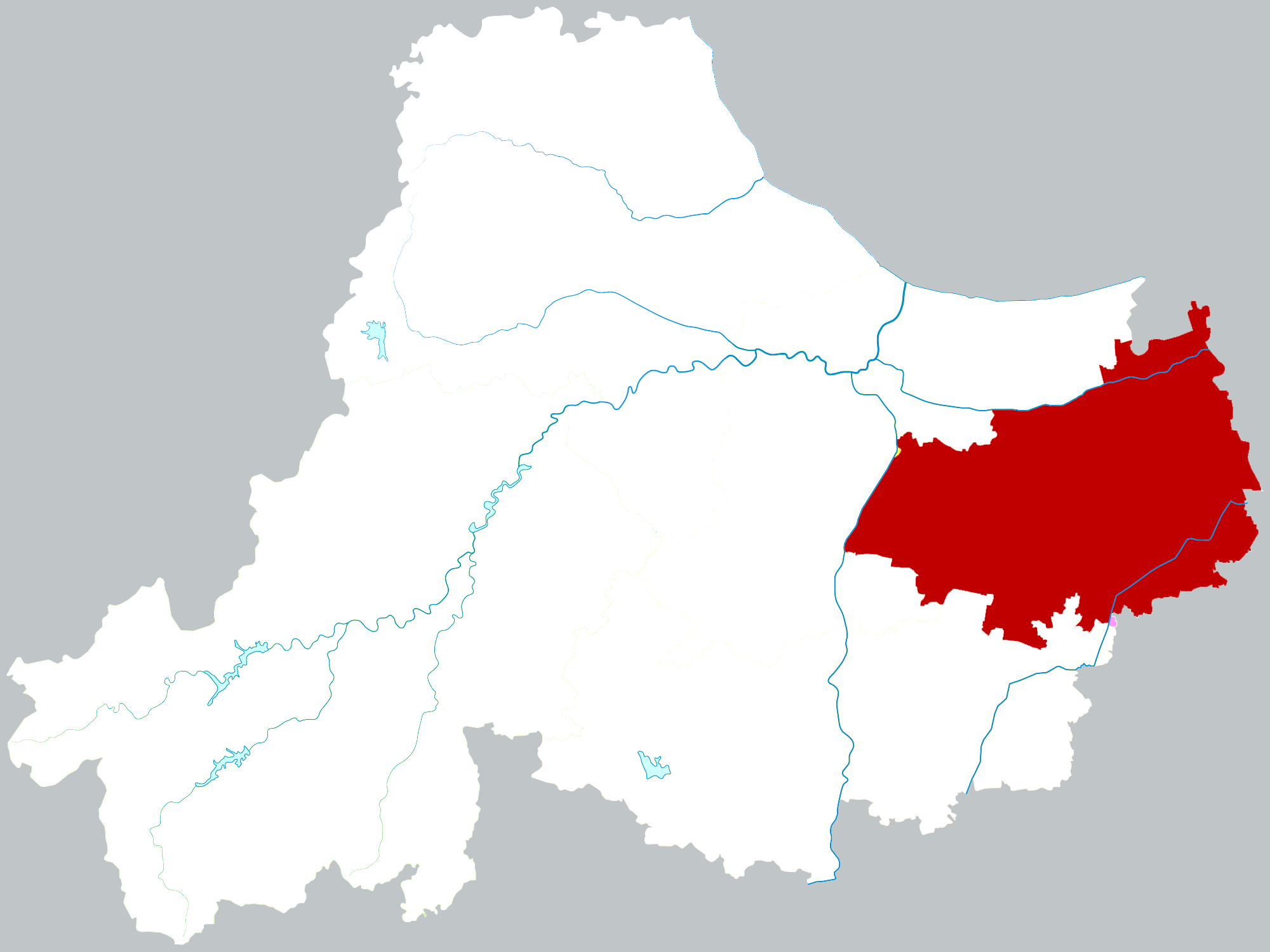
- Location of Nanxun District within Huzhou

- Location in Zhejiang
- Coordinates: 30°53′N 120°25′E
- Country: People's Republic of China
- Province: Zhejiang
- Prefecture-level city: Huzhou
- District seat: Nanxun

Area
  - Total: 702.24 km^{2} (271.14 sq mi)

Population (2020)
  - Total: 542,889
  - Density: 773.08/km^{2} (2,002.3/sq mi)
- Time zone: UTC+8 (China Standard)

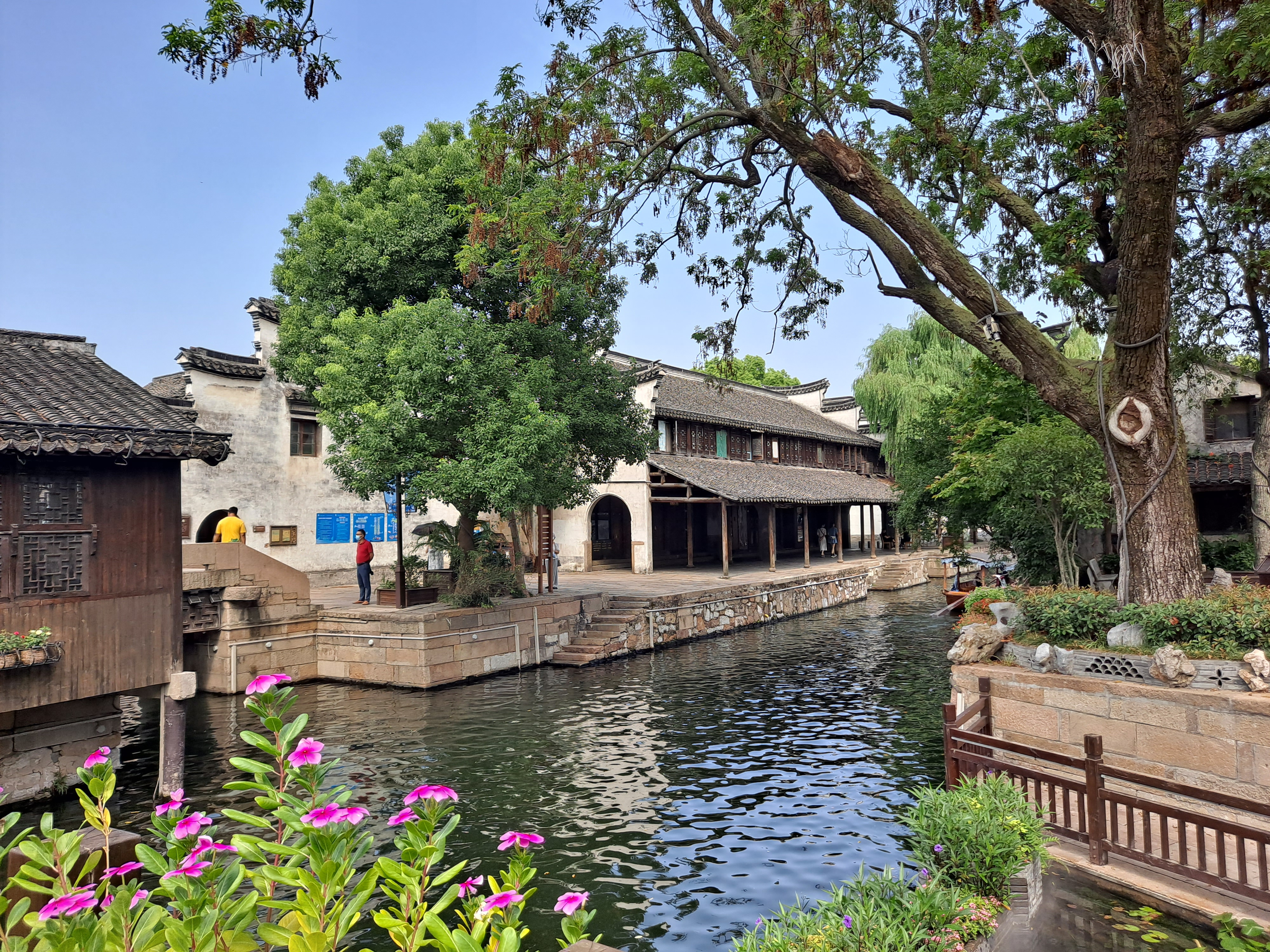
View of Nanxun

Nanxun District (simplified Chinese: 南浔区; traditional Chinese: 南潯區; pinyin: Nánxún Qū) is a district in the prefecture-level city of Huzhou, Zhejiang province, China. Nanxun Town, an ancient water town, is located in the district. It is one of the most well-preserved old towns in this region and is known for its cultural heritage. Other towns in the district include Shuanglin, Lianshi, Linghu, Shanlian, Qianjin and Shicong.

== History ==
It was called Xunxi in the 9th century; Nanxun was established in the 13th century. The town turned into an important distribution center of farm and other products due to convenient transportation by water. Between the 16th to 19th centuries. The area emerged as one of the first entrepreneurial regions in the regions south of the Yangtze River. Production of silkworm and silk reels flourished and the raw silk trade developed. Nanxun became a commodity economy situated between in Jiangsu and Zhejiang provinces.

== Site description ==
The ancient town looks like a cross when viewed from above, with a total area of 68 hectares. Two waterways intersect at the town, they are the Shihe River is from north to south, and that of the ancient Grand Canal from east to west.

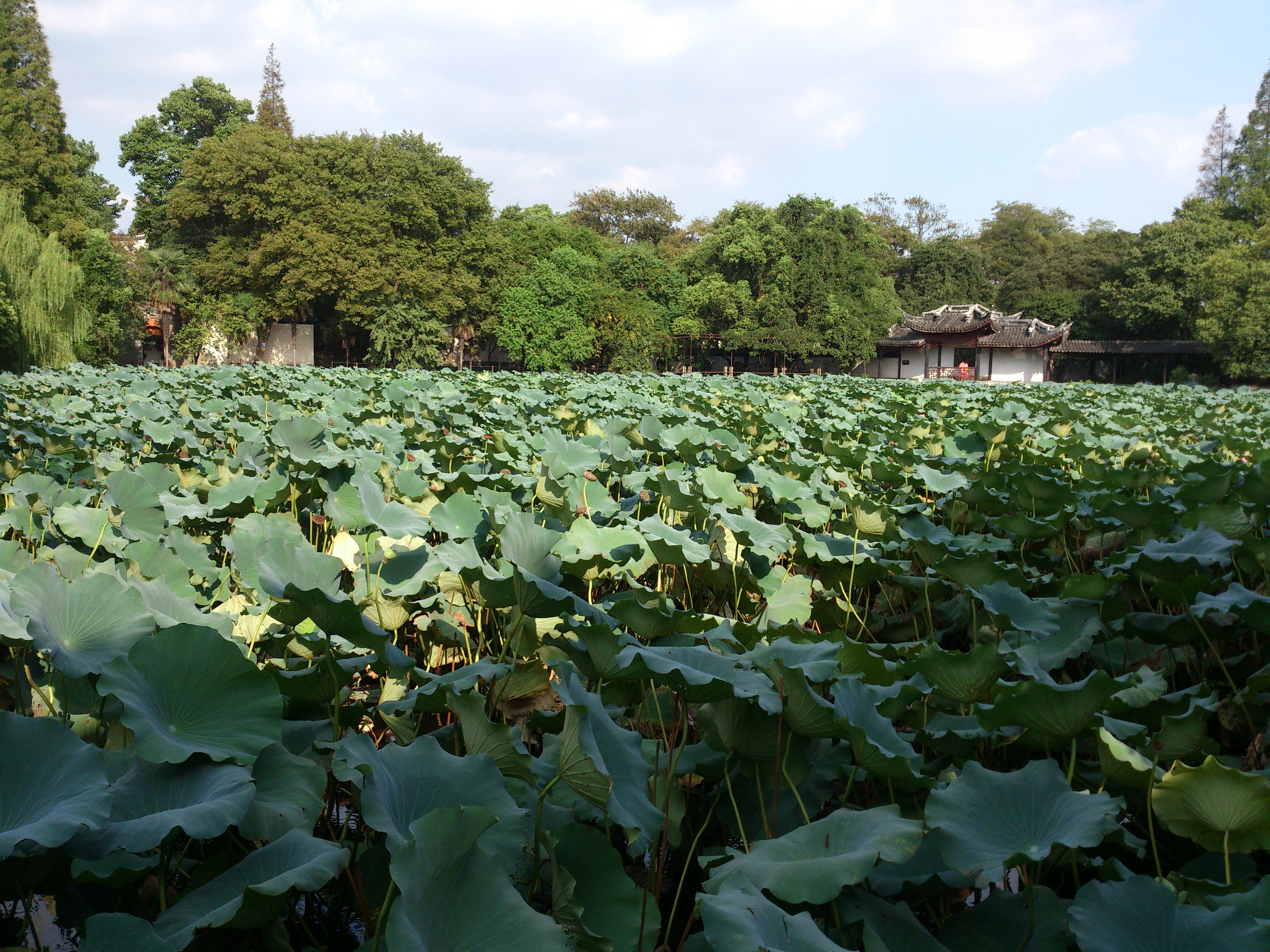
Nanxun Old Town

The town developed due to the waterways. The waterway became streets and houses were constructed beside the waterways. Boats were used for transportation.

The waterways intersected within the town, which is surrounded by an outer ring of waterway. The traffic pattern of the ancient town has the land traffic parallel to the water traffic; the street is in front and the waterway in the rear. In the whole town, the waterways has a total length of 4.5 kilometers. There still remain 15 old bridges from the Song, Yuan, Ming and Qing Dynasties; the traditional flagging streets is 3 kilometers in total length. The houses were built on both sides of the waterways. The style and features of the traditional streets have been preserved. The layout remains that of imposing dwellings and spacious courtyards, gardens and library, guild hall and chamber of commerce, sotto porticos crossing the streets, landing terraces and covered ways. Many traditional houses and carved-brick arches over gateways still stand today. Of these structures from the Ming and Qing Dynasties, there are about 100,000 square meters in floor area, four of which have been registered as cultural heritage relics of Zhejiang province (Two of them have applied for being listed as national cultural conservation relics); nine are the cultural conservation units of Huzhou Municipality, and 20 are the cultural conservation relics of Nanxun Town, which was named the Famous Historic and Cultural Town by the People's Government of Zhejiang Province.

The legend of NanXun

In the ancient China, there was a saying where the titles-'Four elephants, eight bulls and seventy-two golden dogs'-were given to individual families as a symbol and representation of being one of the most wealthy and powerful families in Nanxun.

== Administrative divisions ==
Towns:

- Nanxun Town (南浔镇), Lianshi (练市镇), Shuanglin (双林镇), Shanlian (善琏镇), Jiuguan (旧馆镇), Linghu (菱湖镇), Hefu (和孚镇), Qianjin (千金镇), Shicong (石淙镇)

== Notable inhabitants ==
- Tsar Teh-Yun (1905-2007), guqin master
