= Guanghui Palace =

Taoist temple in Nanxun, Zhejiang, China

- 广惠宫
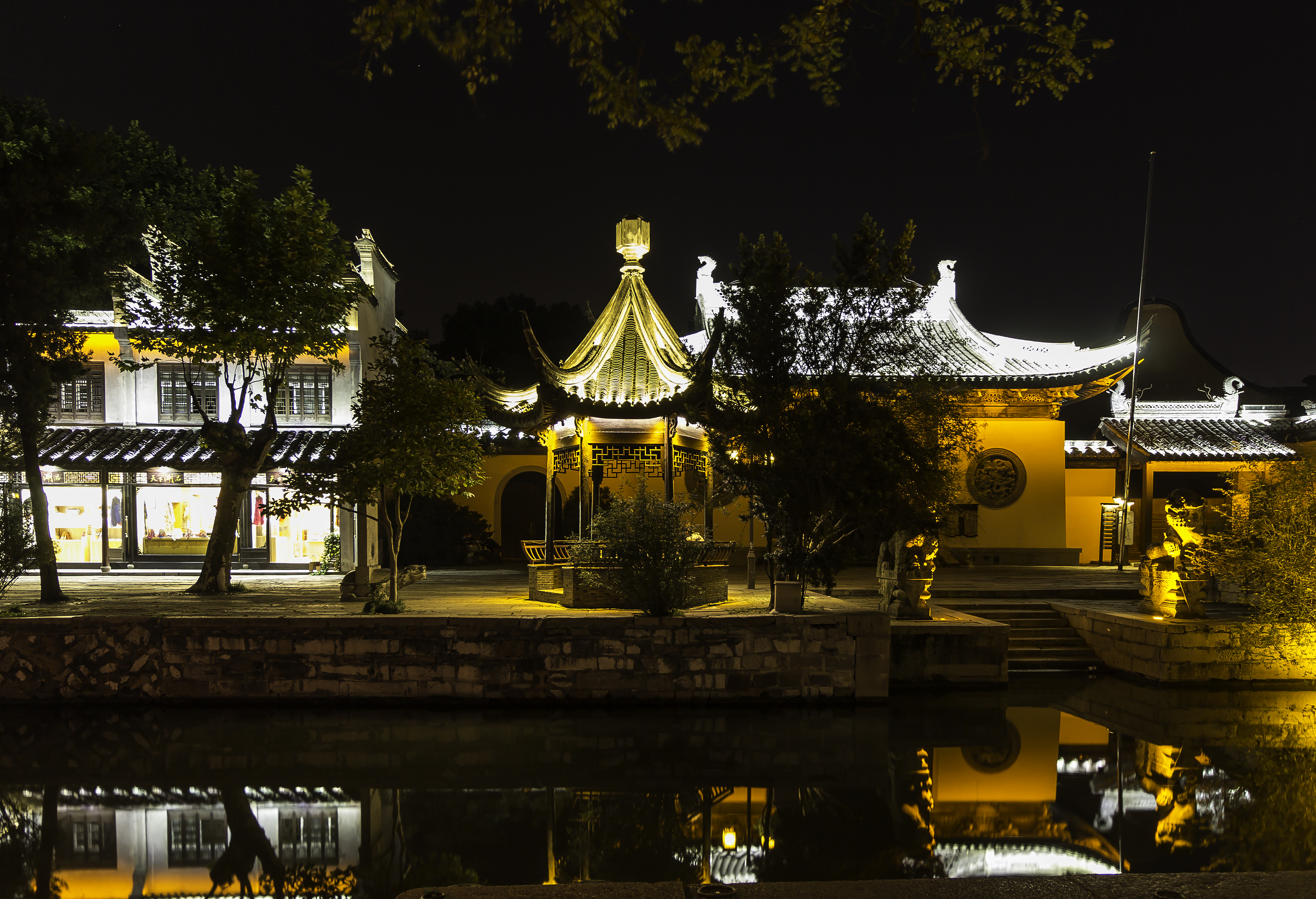
- Guanghui Palace

- Location within Zhejiang

Religion
- Affiliation: Taoism

Location
- Location: Nanxun, Huzhou, Zhejiang
- Country: China
- Interactive map of Guanghui Palace
- Coordinates: 30°52′33.81″N 120°25′34.74″E

Architecture
- Style: Chinese architecture
- Established: 1064–1067

Guanghui Palace (simplified Chinese: 广惠宫; traditional Chinese: 廣惠宮; pinyin: Guǎnghuì Gōng), commonly known as Zhang–Wang Temple (张王庙; 張王廟; Zhāng–Wáng Miào), is a Taoist temple located in Nanxun city, Huzhou, Zhejiang, China.

== History ==
The temple was first established in the reign of Emperor Yingzong of Song of the Song dynasty (960–1127). In late 12 century, Zhang Shicheng used the temple as his Xinggong (Chinese: 行宫; lit. 'imperial palace for short stays away from the capital'). The lower parts of the buildings were torn down and repaired several times, due wars and natural disasters. The current temple was repaired and renovated in 2003.

== Architecture ==
The statues of Three Pure Ones are enshrined in the main hall of the temple.
