= Tongjin Bridge =

Tongjin Bridge 通津桥
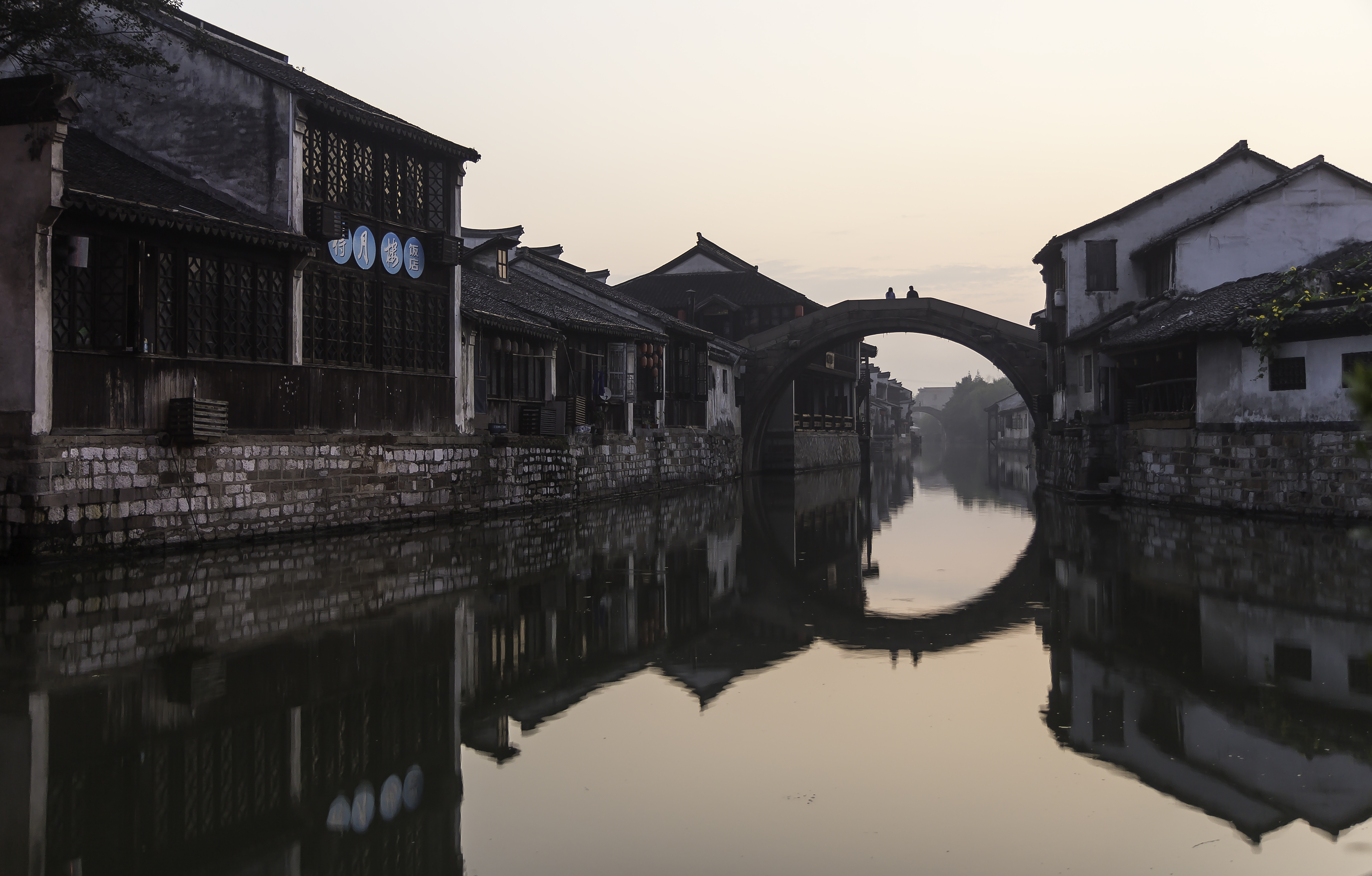
- Tongjin Bridge.
- Coordinates: 30°52′49.08″N 120°25′32.16″E
- Locale: Nanxun, Huzhou, Zhejiang, China

Characteristics
- Design: Arch Bridge
- Material: Stone
- Total length: 28 metres (92 ft)
- Width: 4 metres (13 ft)
- Height: 7.6 metres (25 ft)
- Longest span: 14 metres (46 ft)

History
- Construction start: Song dynasty
- Construction end: 1798 (reconstruction)
- Opened: 1798

Location
- Interactive map of Tongjin Bridge

The Guanyin Bridge (simplified Chinese: 通津桥; traditional Chinese: 通津橋; pinyin: Tōngjīn Qiáo) is a historic stone arch bridge in Nanxun, Huzhou, Zhejiang, China. It is the largest bridge in the town of Nanxun.

== History ==
The original bridge dates back to the Song dynasty (960–1279). The current bridge was reconstructed in 1798, during the reign of Jiaqing Emperor of the Qing dynasty (1644–1911). It underwent three renovations, respectively in the 5th year of Xianfeng period (1855) and in the 7th year of Xianfeng period (1857) and in the ruling of Tongzhi Emperor (1866). In the Ming (1368–1644) and Qing dynasties, a bustling silk fair was held near the bridge. In March 1989, it was designated as municipal level cultural heritage by the Huzhou Municipal Government.

== Architecture ==
The bridge is 28 metres (92 ft) long, 4 metres (13 ft) wide, and approximately 7.6 metres (25 ft) high.
