= Little Lotus Manor =

Botanical gardens in China

Coordinates: 30.8692°N 120.4295°E

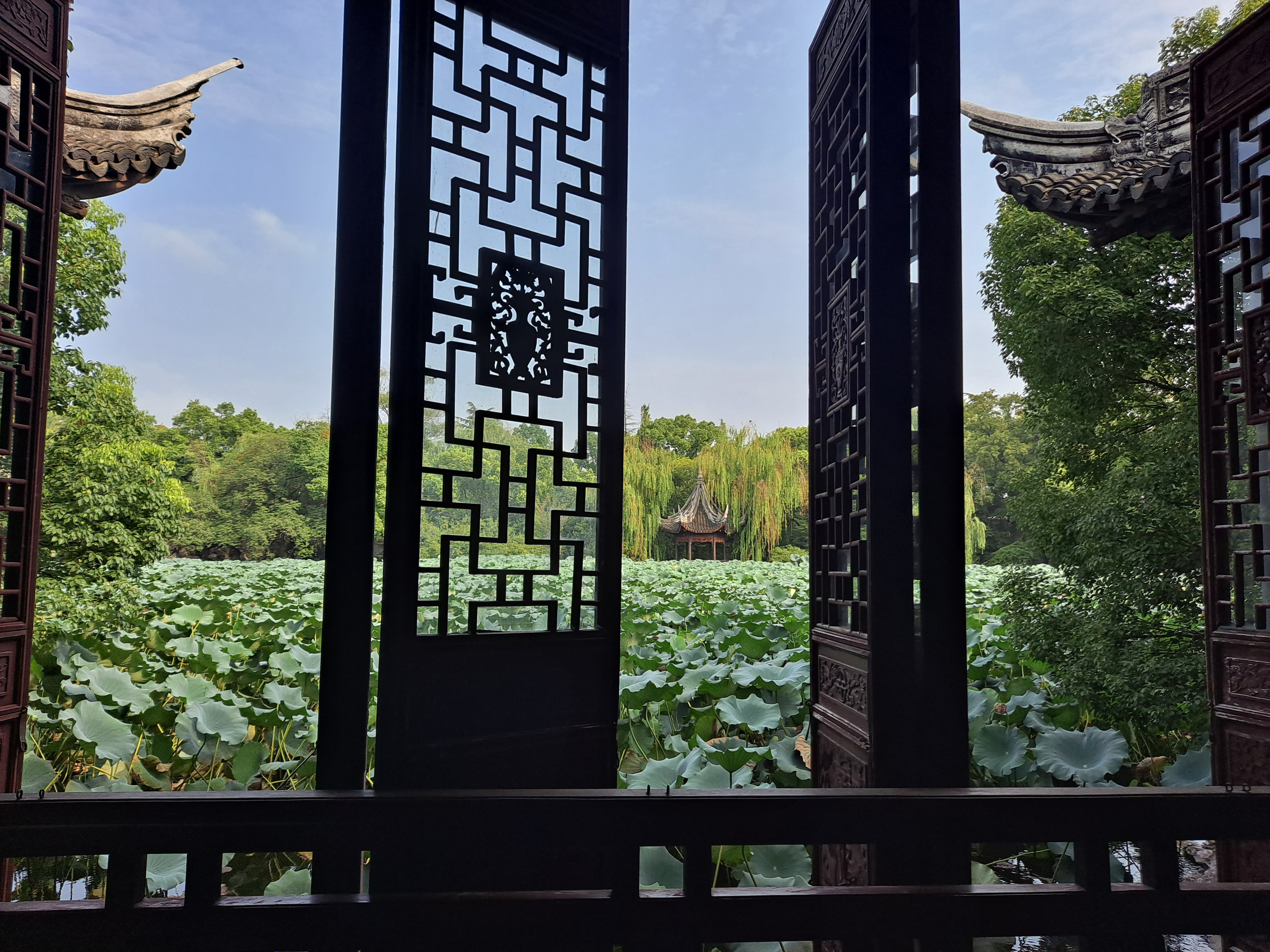
Little Lotus Manor

The Little Lotus Manor or Xiaolianzhuang (Chinese: 小莲庄) is a private garden in Huzhou, Zhejiang, China, built by the Qing dynasty merchant Liu Yong (1826–1899) in 1885. The center piece here is an immense lotus pond anchoring the southeastern end of the pond is a Western-style two-story red brick house that was used as a retreat for the women of the house. To the southeast are two stone memorial archways.

== See also ==
- List of Chinese gardens
