= Taiping Bridge (Shaoxing) =

Taiping Bridge 太平桥
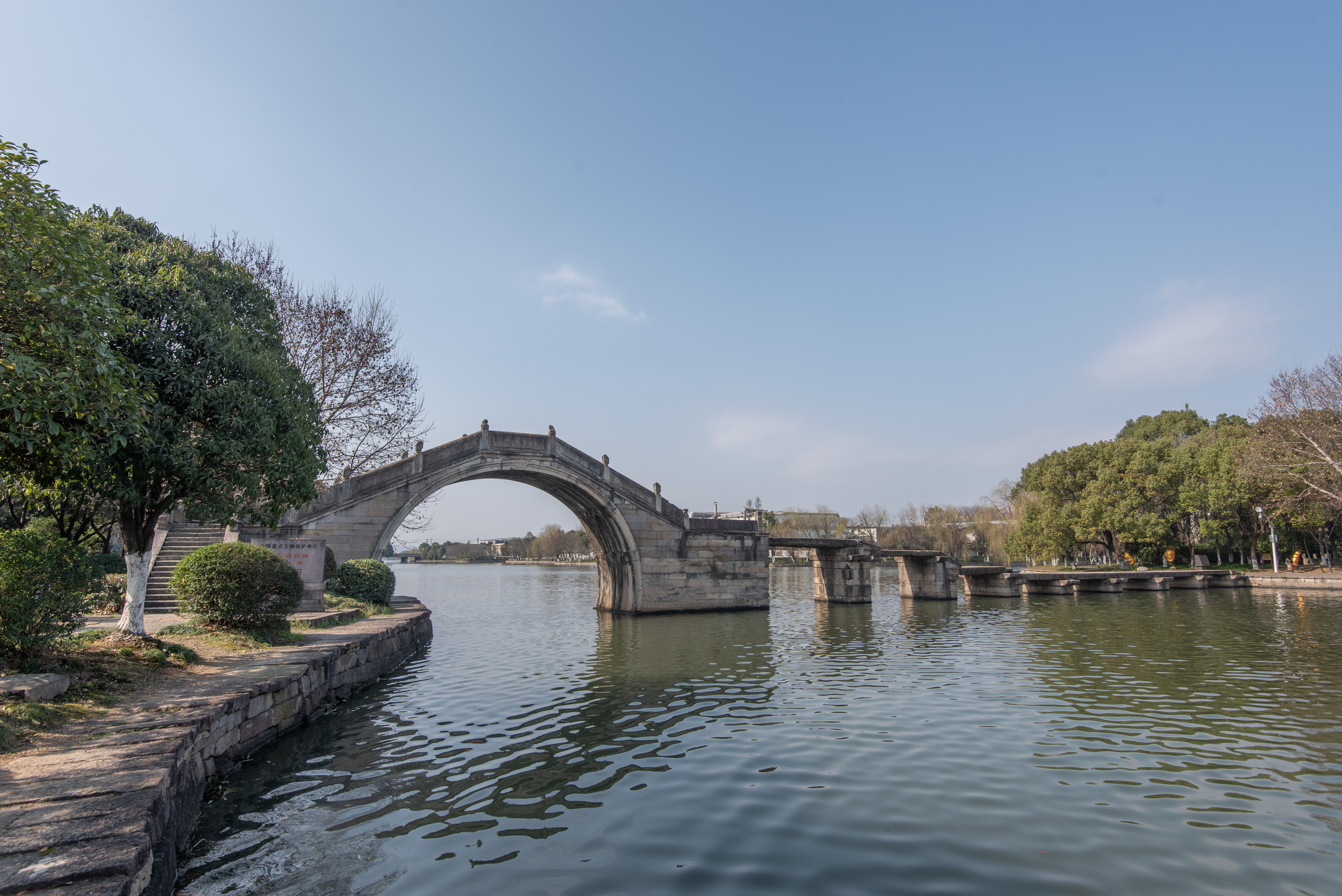
- Taiping Bridge in February 2021
- Coordinates: 30°05′12″N 120°27′48″E
- Carries: Pedestrians
- Crosses: Eastern Zhejiang Canal
- Locale: Keyan Subdistrict, Keqiao District of Shaoxing, Zhejiang, China

Characteristics
- Design: Arch bridge
- Material: Stone
- Total length: 40 metres (130 ft)
- Width: 3.5 metres (11 ft)

History
- Construction end: 1620
- Rebuilt: 1858

The Taiping Bridge (simplified Chinese: 太平桥; traditional Chinese: 太平橋; pinyin: Tàipíng Qiáo) is a historic stone arch bridge over the Eastern Zhejiang Canal in Keyan Subdistrict, Keqiao District of Shaoxing, Zhejiang, China.

== History ==
The bridge was first built in 1620 during the Wanli era of the Ming dynasty (1368–1644), and rebuilt in 1858 during the reign of Xianfeng Emperor of the Qing dynasty (1644–1911).

On 6 May 2013, it was listed among the seventh batch of "Major National Historical and Cultural Sites in Zhejiang" by the State Council of China.

== Gallery ==
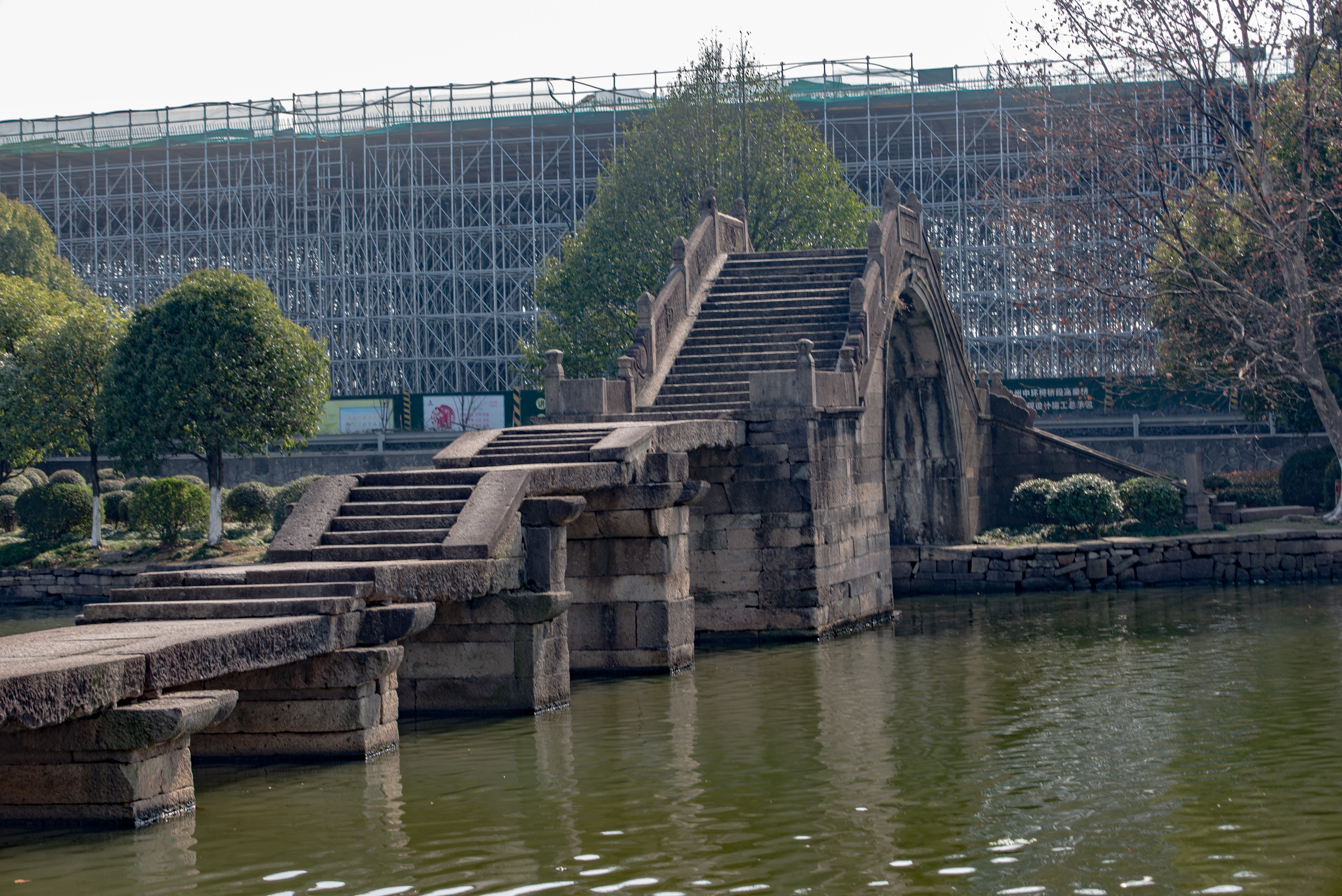
Taiping Bridge

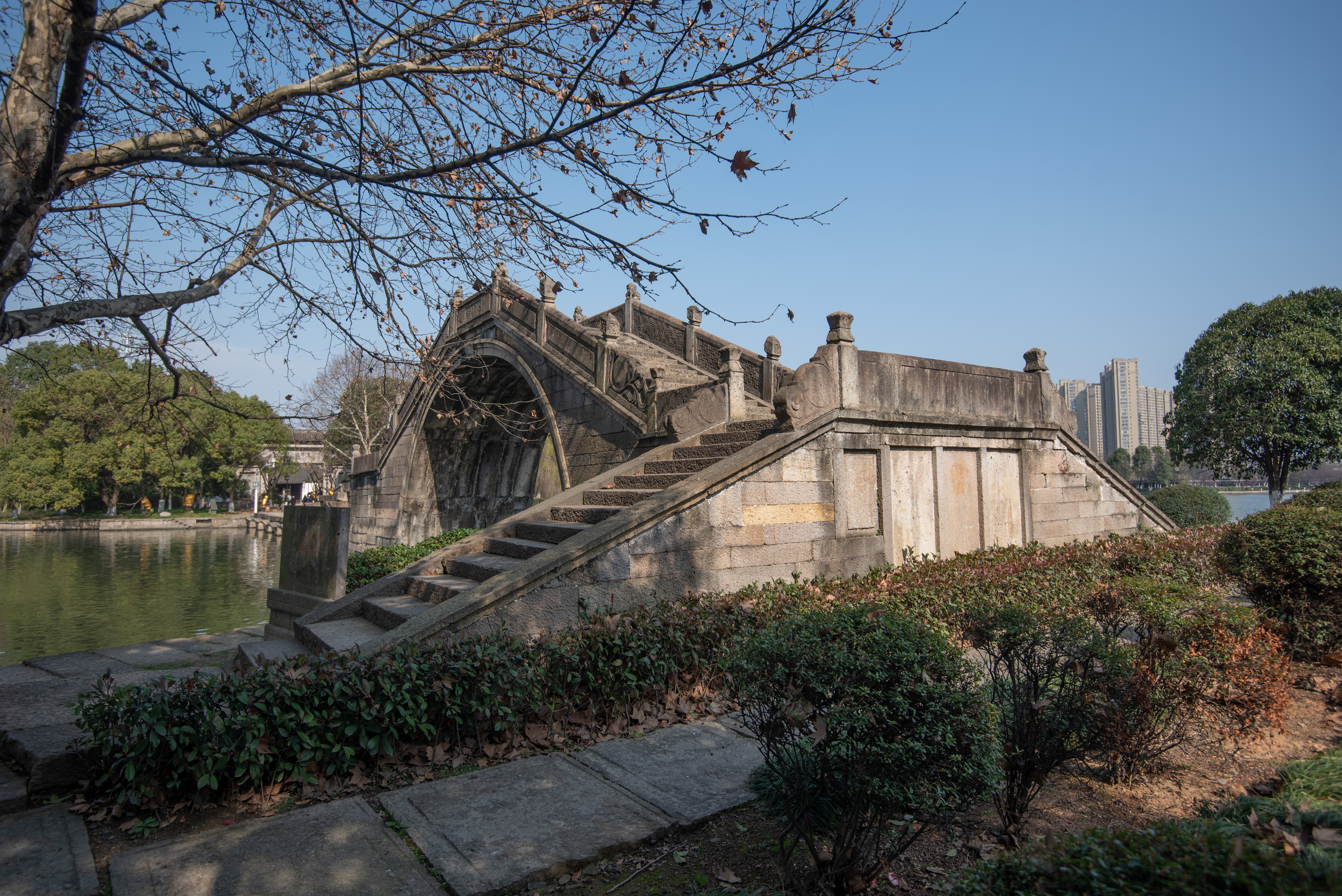
Taiping Bridge

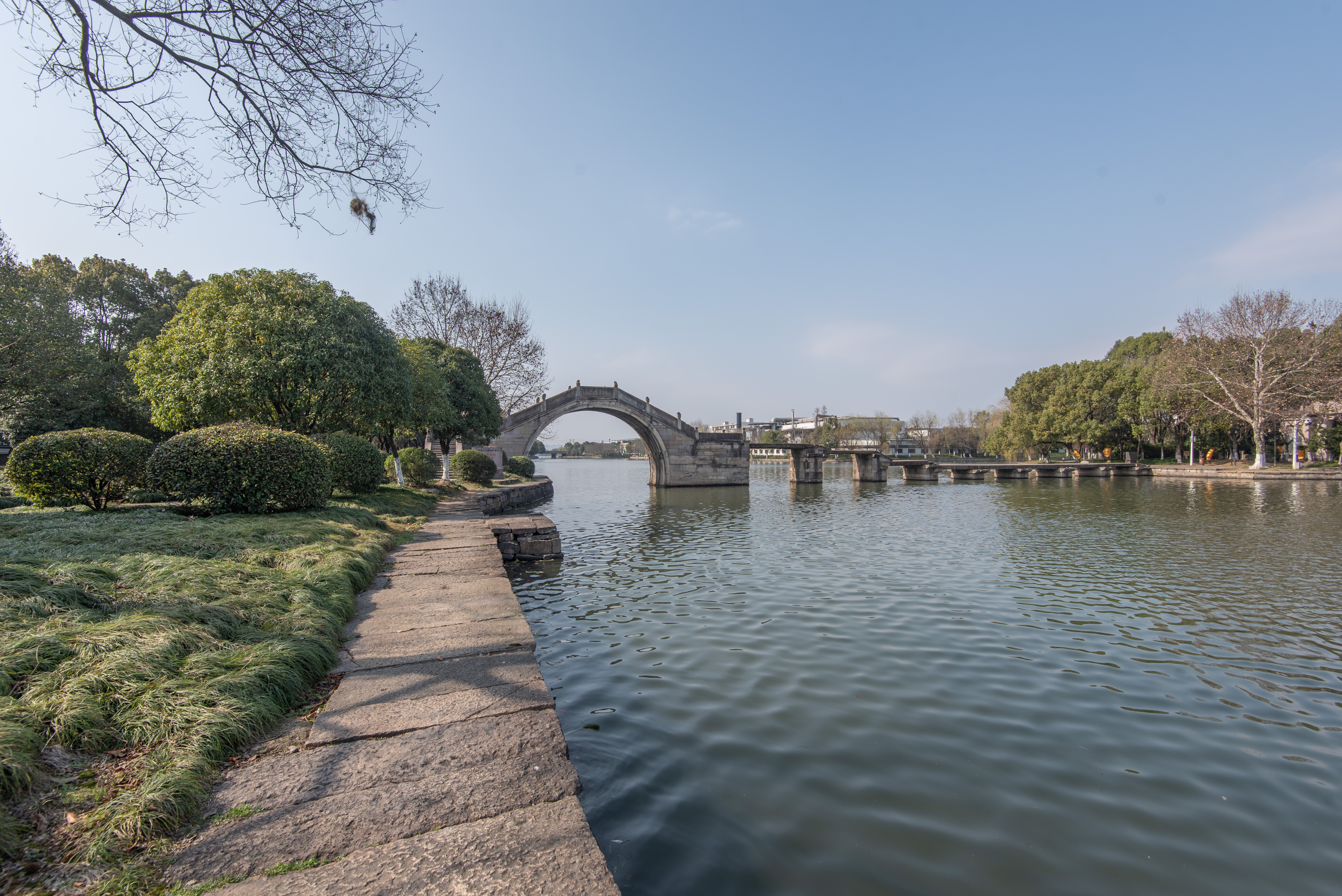
Taiping Bridge

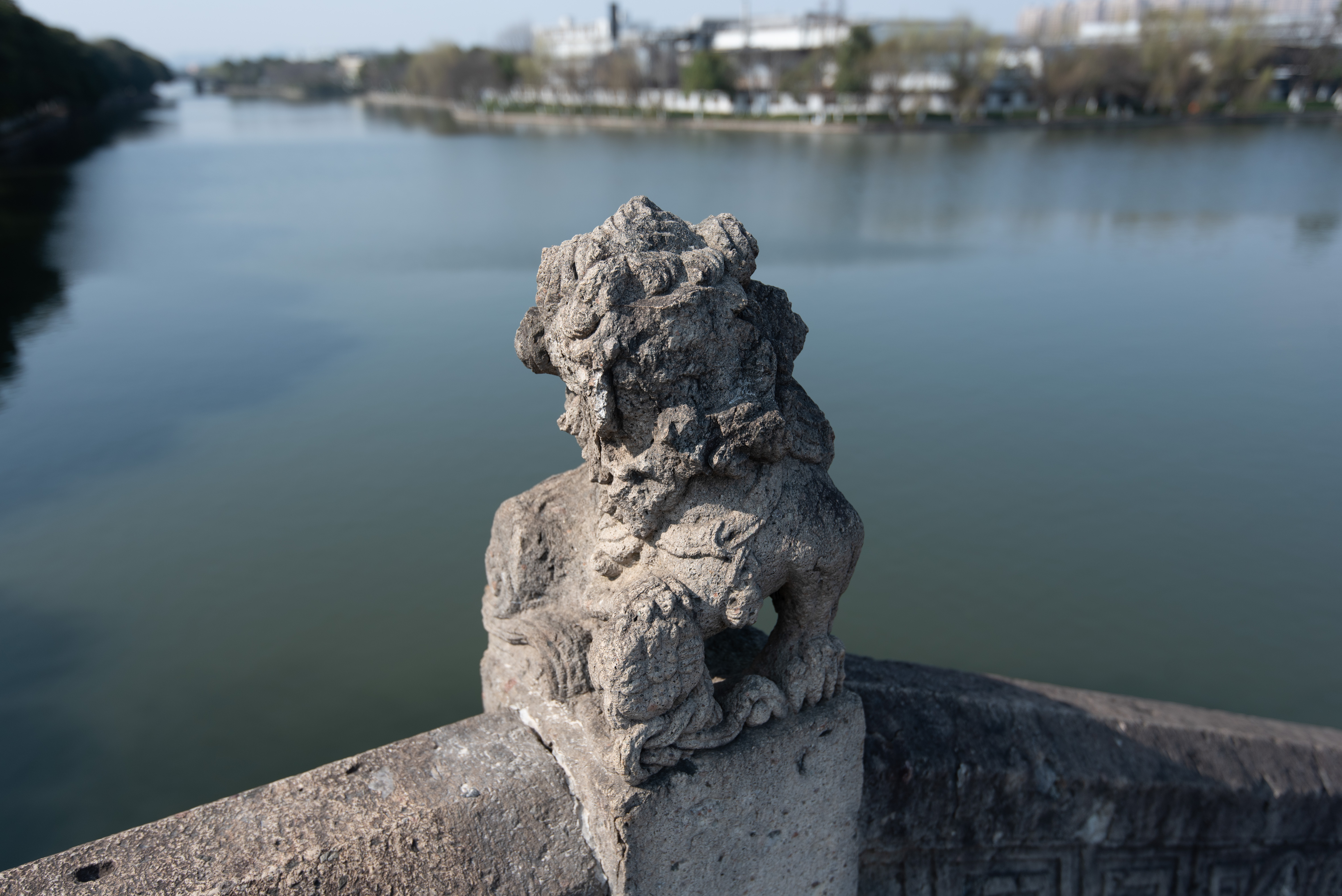
Stone lion on the post

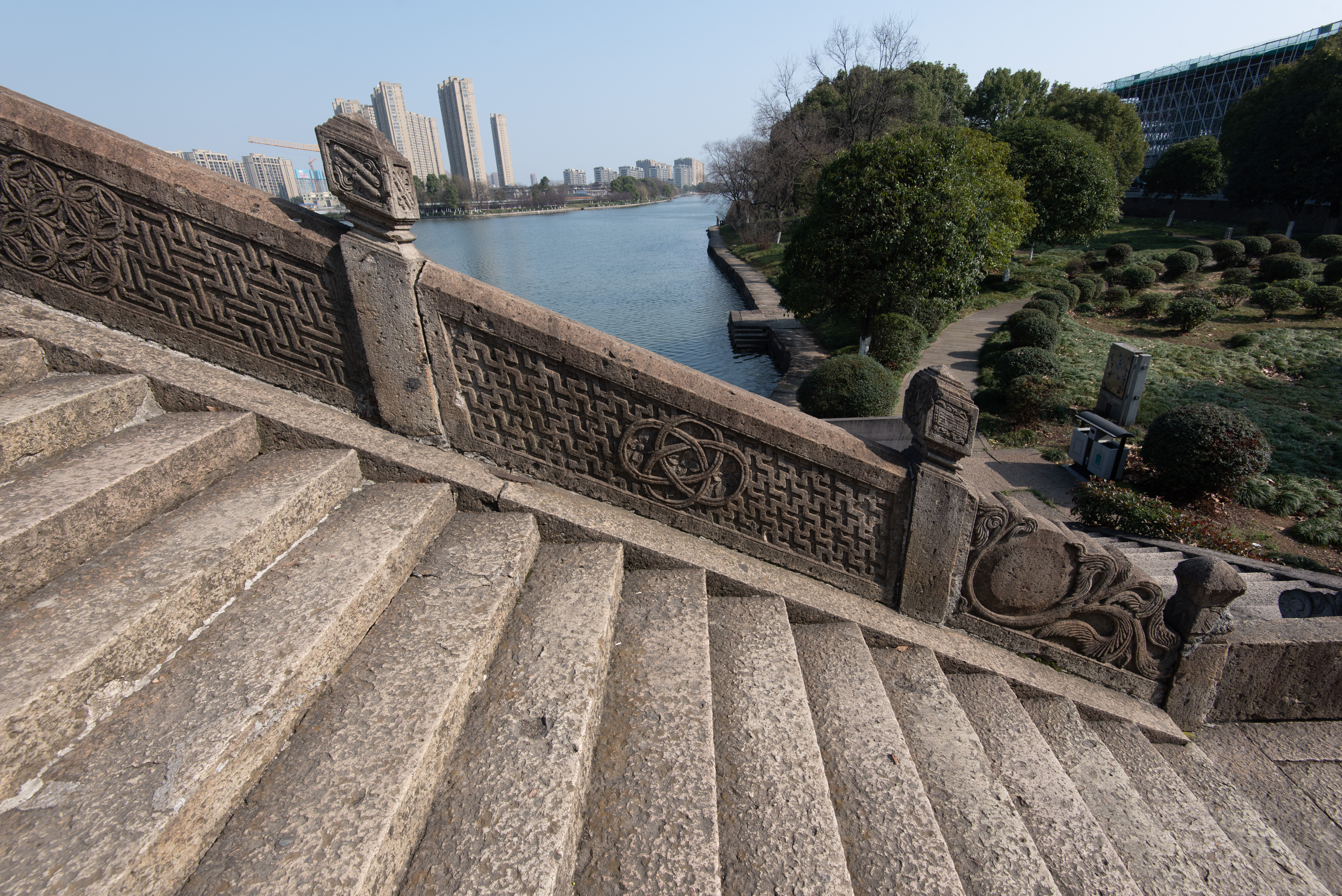
Stone carvings on the fence

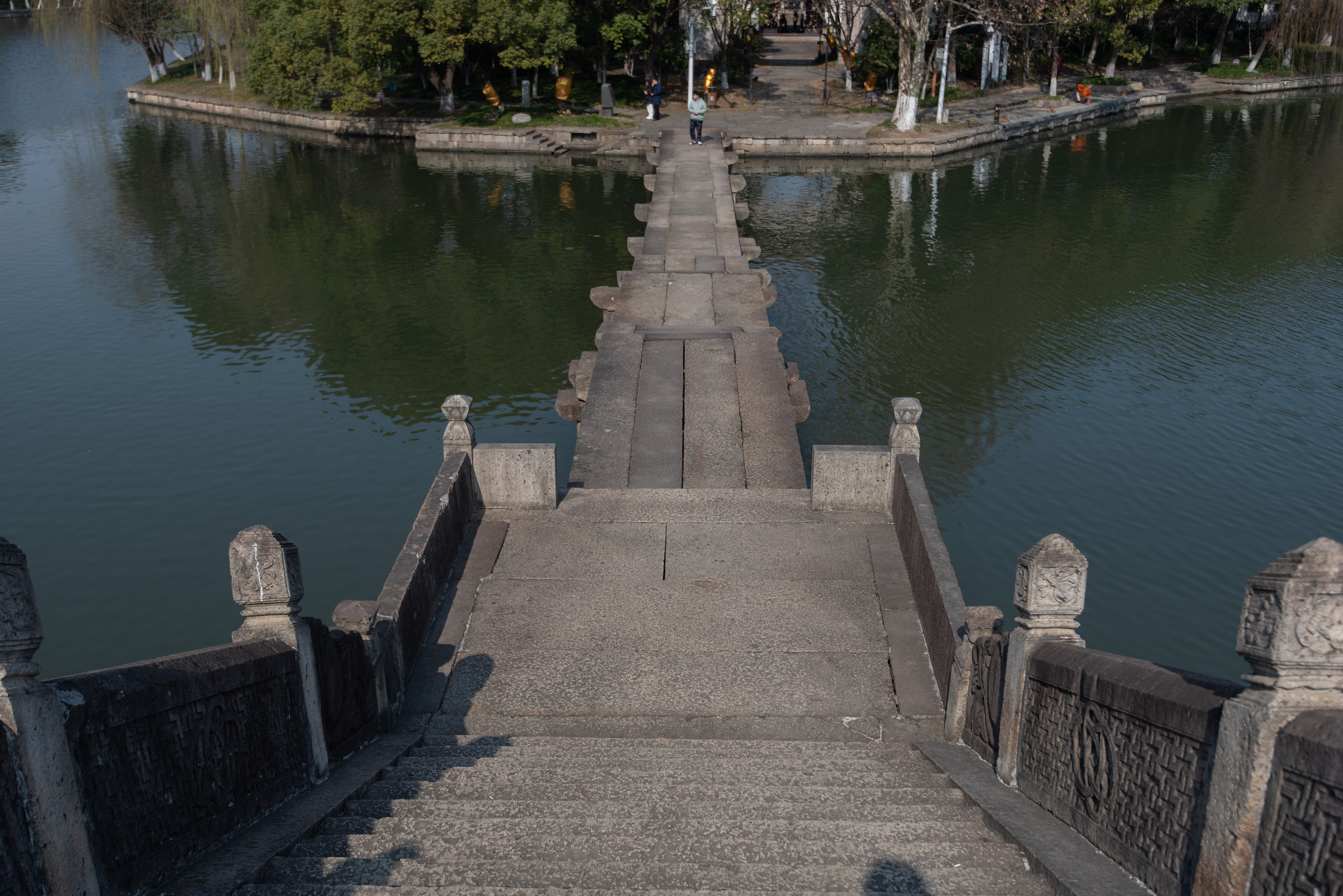
Taiping Bridge
