= Hongming Bridge =

Hongming Bridge 虹明桥
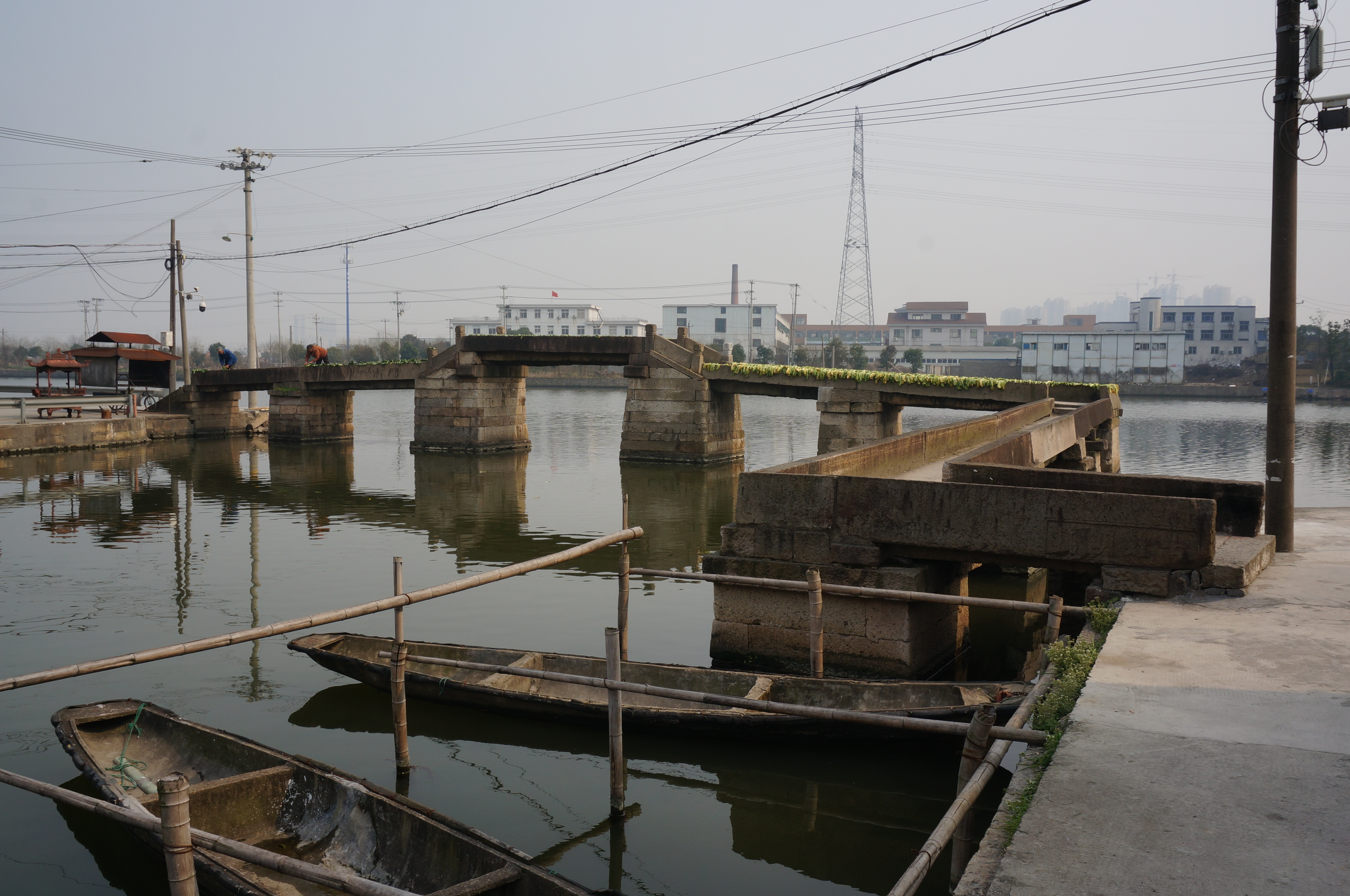
- Hongming Bridge in February 2017
- Coordinates: 30°00′11″N 120°32′02″E
- Carries: Pedestrians and bicycles
- Crosses: Xushan River (徐山大江)
- Locale: Keqiao District, Shaoxing, Zhejiang, China

Characteristics
- Design: Arch bridge
- Material: Stone
- Total length: 61 metres (200 ft)
- Height: 2.8 metres (9 ft 2 in)

History
- Construction end: Song dynasty (960–1279)
- Rebuilt: 1796

Location
- Interactive map of Hongming Bridge

The Hongming Bridge (simplified Chinese: 虹明桥; traditional Chinese: 虹明橋; pinyin: Hongming Qiáo) is a historic stone arch bridge over the Xushan River in Keqiao District, Shaoxing, Zhejiang, China.

== History ==
Originally built in the Song dynasty (960–1279), the bridge was rebuilt in 1796 during the era of Jiaqing Emperor of the Qing dynasty (1644–1911).

In January 2017, it has been designated as a provincial cultural relic preservation organ by the Government of Zhejiang.
