= Rongguang Bridge =

Historic stone arch bridge in Keqiao District, Shaoxing, Zhejiang, China

Rongguang Bridge 融光桥
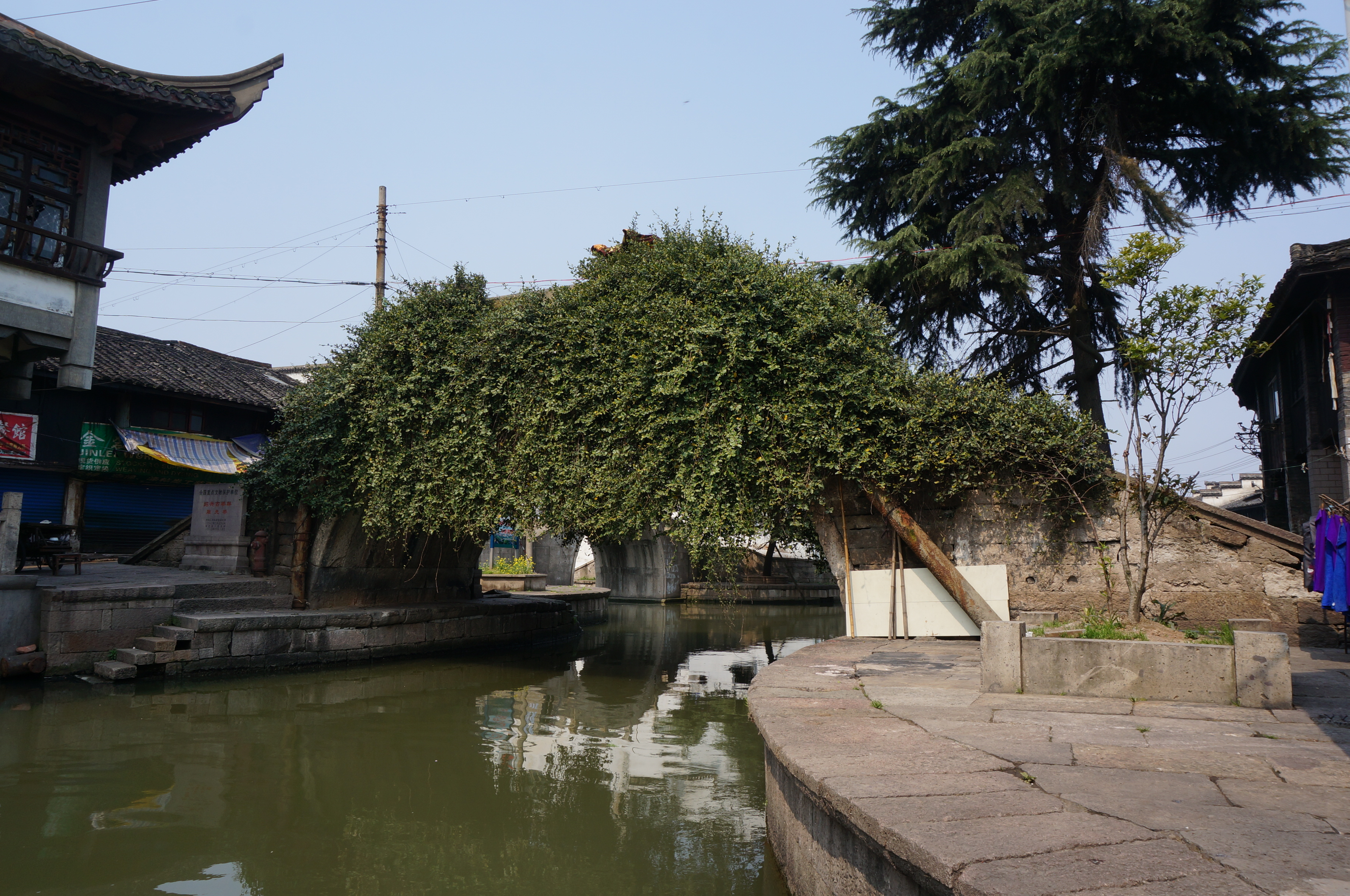
- The Rongguang Bridge in March 2016.
- Coordinates: 30°04′13″N 120°28′20″E
- Crosses: Eastern Zhejiang Canal
- Locale: Keqiao District, Shaoxing, Zhejiang, China
- Other name(s): Ke Bridge; Hongwei Bridge

Characteristics
- Design: Arch Bridge
- Material: Stone
- Total length: 15 metres (49 ft)
- Width: 3.6 metres (12 ft)
- Height: 7 metres (23 ft)
- Longest span: 10 metres (33 ft)

History
- Construction end: Chenghua period (1465–1487) of the Ming dynasty (1368–1644) (reconstruction)

Rongguang Bridge (simplified Chinese: 融光桥; traditional Chinese: 融光橋; pinyin: Róngguāng Qiáo) is a historic stone arch bridge over the Eastern Zhejiang Canal in Keqiao District, Shaoxing, Zhejiang, China.

== History ==
The present bridge was completed in the Chenghua period (1465–1487) of the Ming dynasty (1368–1644). Its name comes from a nearby Buddhist temple named "Rongguang Temple" (融光寺). In March 2013, it was listed among the seventh batch of "Major National Historical and Cultural Sites in Zhejiang" as a part of Historic Bridges in Shaoxing by the State Council of China.

== Architecture ==
The bridge measures 15 metres (49 ft) long, 3.6 metres (12 ft) wide, and approximately 7 metres (23 ft) high.
