= Roads in China =

Roads in China may refer to:

- Expressways of China
- China National Highways
- Other streets and roads in China

== See also ==
- History of transport in China
