= Eastern Zhejiang Canal =

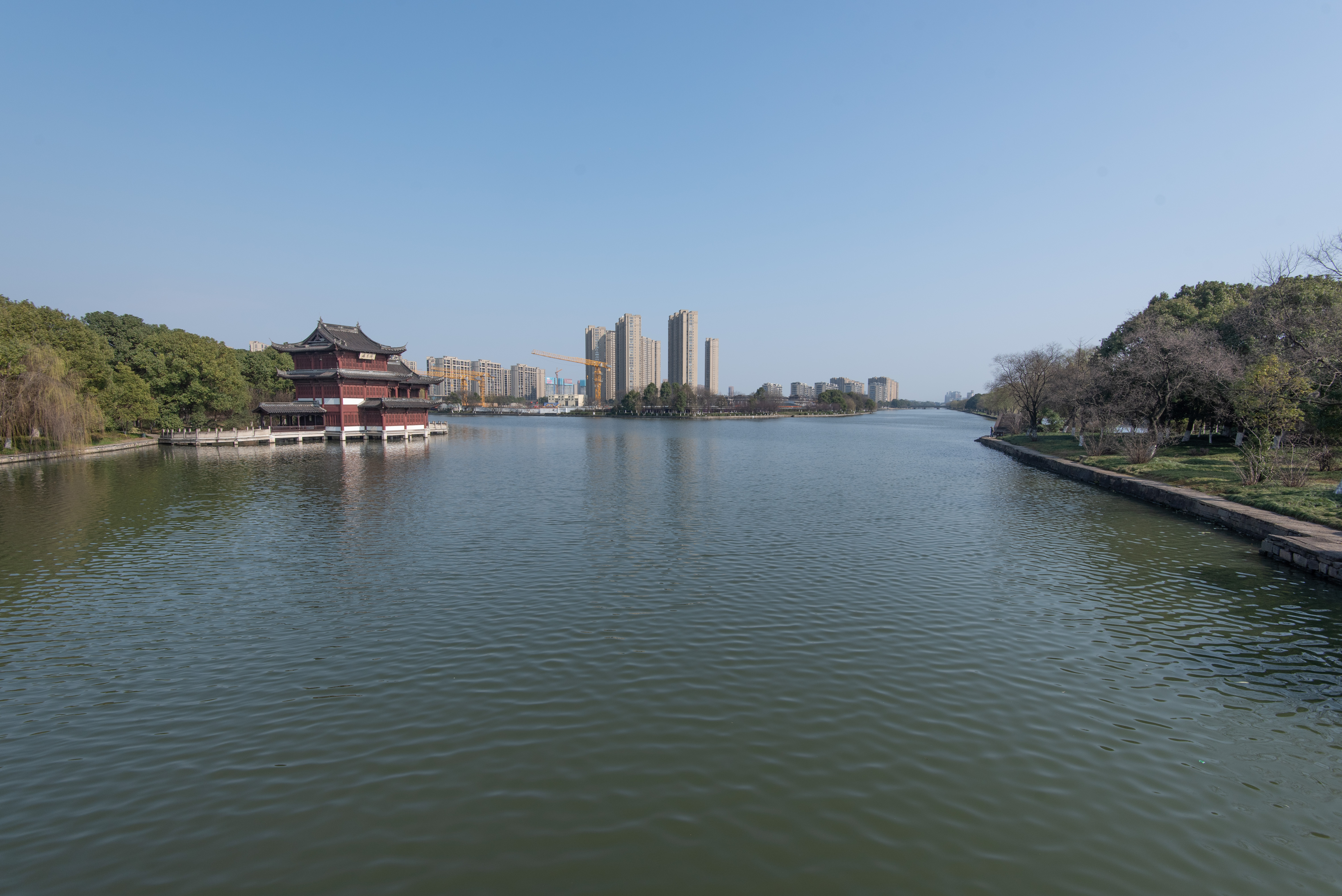
- View of the canal from Taiping Bridge, Shaoxing
- Interactive map of Eastern Zhejiang Canal

Specifications
- Length: 239 miles (385 km)

History
- Construction began: Spring and Autumn period
- Date restored: 29 December 2007

Geography
- Start point: Xixing, Binjiang District, Hangzhou
- End point: Yong River, Zhenhai District, Ningbo
- Connects to: Qiantang River, East China Sea

Eastern Zhejiang Canal
- Traditional Chinese: 浙東運河
- Simplified Chinese: 浙东运河
Transcriptions
Standard Mandarin
- Hanyu Pinyin: Zhèdōng Yùnhé
- Wade–Giles: Che-tung Yün-ho

Hangyong Canal
- Traditional Chinese: 杭甬運河
- Simplified Chinese: 杭甬运河
- Literal meaning: Hangzhou–Ningbo Canal
Transcriptions
Standard Mandarin
- Hanyu Pinyin: Hángyǒng Yùnhé; Háng–Yǒng Yùnhé
- Wade–Giles: Hang-yung Yün-ho; Hang–Yung Yün-ho

Eastern Zhejiang Canal
UNESCO World Heritage Site
- Interactive map of Eastern Zhejiang Canal
- Location: China
- Part of: The Grand Canal
- Criteria: Cultural: (i)(iii)(iv)(vi)
- Reference: 1443bis
- Inscription: 2014 (38th Session)
- Extensions: 2016

The Eastern Zhejiang or Zhedong Canal, also known as the Hangzhou–Ningbo or Hangyong Canal, is a major canal connecting Hangzhou, Shaoxing, and Ningbo in northern Zhejiang, China. It runs 239 kilometres (149 mi), connecting the Qiantang, Cao'e, and Yong watersheds with Hangzhou's terminus for the Grand Canal and Ningbo's ports on the East China Sea. Since 2013, it has been officially considered the southernmost section of the Grand Canal itself.

The terrain of this area of Zhejiang slopes down from mountains to the south to the coastal plain along Hangzhou Bay to the north. The oldest section of the present waterway was the Shanyin Canal constructed in Shaoxing by the Yue official Fan Li in the 5th century BC during the late Spring and Autumn period. Despite the need to create numerous locks and dams to allow boats to change levels at the various rivers crossed by the canal, the entire route was completed with the excavation of the Xixing Canal under the Jin official He Xun in the 3rd century AD.

The canal was an important artery of transport and supply during various periods of disunity in medieval China, notably under the Southern Song whose capital was at Lin'an within present-day Hangzhou. Despite its lesser importance under the Yuan, Ming, and Qing, the canal was kept navigable through the early modern period before being largely supplanted by railways and roads. Renovation of the canal began in 2002, providing navigability for modern barges except around Ningbo by 2009 and complete navigation of the entire canal by the end of 2013.

In November 2008, the Eastern Zhejiang Canal was added to the Grand Canal's nomination with the UNESCO World Heritage program as it served as an extension of the Beijing–Hangzhou Canal and provided an additional connection from the cities along the canal to Ningbo's ports and the Maritime Silk Road. In May 2013, the Eastern Zhejiang Canal was officially included as part of the Grand Canal within China and listed in the seventh group of Major Historical and Cultural Site Protected at the National Level. In 2014, it was inducted as a World Heritage Site alongside the Beijing–Hangzhou Grand Canal and the Sui and Tang Grand Canal.

== Layout ==
The west end of the Eastern Zhejiang Canal is Xixing in Hangzhou's Binjiang District. After passing Xixing, entering Xiaoshan District, following by Qianqing, Keqiao District, the canal crosses the old Qianqing River. The canal then goes southeast, entering Yuecheng District and lies across Cao'e River. The section ranging from Xixing to Cao'e is also known as the Shaoshao Canal. After passing the Cao'e River, the canal enters Shangyu District and diverges to two branches. From Shangyantou on the east side of Cao'e River to Caoshu Bridge in Yuyao. The northerly Yuyu Canal connects it to the Yao River. From Cao'e River to Tongming Dam, the southerly branch known as the Forty Mile River flows into the Yao River and runs parallel to the Houxin and Shibali Rivers. The main stem of the canal then enters the natural river. The tributary developed in Zhangting is named the Ci River, and the branch formed in Gaoqiao in Ningbo is called the Xitang River. After passing the Yao and Fenghua Rivers, the two tributaries meet at Sanjiangkou area in Ningbo and create the Yong River. The confluence flows into the East China Sea from the east side of Zhaobaoshan in Zhenhai District. From west to east, the Ci River divides at Shazigang, the south side of Cicheng, connecting with the Yao River at the Xiaoxi Dam. After passing Huazi Gate, the Ci River is called the Zhongda River and enters Zhenhai District from Jiangbei District, finally flowing into the Yong River. The Xitang river travels eastward to Wangjing Gate in Ningbo, meeting the moat and water system in its old town and links to Fenghua River. The design of the parallel inner and outer tributaries is meant to avoid the influence of tides from the outer tributary and causes the flow to cease meandering and to continue straight downstream.

The map of the Eastern Zhejiang Canal's layout

== History ==
Because of the abundant precipitation in Eastern Zhejiang Area, canal construction was relatively easy, though there are few records regarding the process of construction. The history of the Eastern Zhejiang Canal can be traced back to the Shanyin Canal during China's Spring and Autumn period. According to the Yuejue, it was begun by Fan Li during his time supervising the reconstruction of Shanyin's Dongguo Gate. From Dongguo Gate to Liantang in Shangyu District, the Shanyin Canal is 20.7 km (12.9 mi) in length.

During the reign of Emperor Hui of Jin dynasty (AD 290–301), due to the need for irrigation, the official He Xun supervised the construction of the Xixing Canal, from Xixing, the east shore of Qiantang River to Kuaiji City. From then on, this canal section, along with the channels east to Shangyu District, the natural waterways of Yao River and Yong River, constituted the Eastern Zhejiang Canal. During the Northern and Southern dynasties, under governmental and private management, the operation of the Eastern Zhejiang Canal was shaped. In the mid-Tang dynasty, because of the busy traffic along Jiangnan Canal, local officials of eastern Zhejiang were appointed to dredge the canal, increase water locks and dams, dig new waterways and dredge Jian Lake. Jian Lake thus became one important source of water to the canal.

The capital of the Southern Song dynasty was Lin'an (present-day Hangzhou). Because of the conflicts between Jurchen Jin and Chinese Song, the northern part of Beijing Hangzhou Grand Canal disconnected from Jiangnan, and Eastern Zhejiang Canal and Jiangnan Canal became vital to Southern Song people. Additionally, because the Southern Song people thought highly of overseas trading, and Qingyuan Prefecture (now Ningbo) was an important port for international trades, the government particularly paid attention to the maintenance of the canal. In the early years of the Southern Song dynasty, Emperor Gaozong (Zhao Gou) recruited laborers to reconstruct the Shaoxing and Yuyao sections. During the Southern Song dynasty, the Eastern Zhejiang Canal was restored several times, and its navigability was improved. According to Jiatai Kuaiji records, at that time the two canal sections in Xiaoshan County and Shangyu County could carry 200 vessels; the two canal sections in Shanyin County and Yao River could carry 500 vessels. At that time, the Eastern Zhejiang Canal was at its acme in respect of navigability and prosperity.

During the Yuan and Ming dynasties, the governmental repair works and preservation of the Eastern Zhejiang Canal were still ongoing, which retained its navigability, though it was not as prosperous as in the Southern Song dynasty. In the Ming dynasty, the natural environment in the Eastern Zhejiang changed. Qianqing River, previously an obstruction to the Eastern Zhejiang Canal, was blocked, and its north and south weirs were dismantled so there was no obstruction to the channel between Xiaoshan and Cao'e. With the construction of seawalls and the formation of tidal flats in Zhejiang, a water system with lakes densely covering the regions along the canal was developed. In the Qing dynasty, the Eastern Zhejiang Canal gradually lessened in importance; many courier stations along the canal were removed or combined with other stations. According to the records of Huang Zongxi, there were only dozens of larger-scale vessels serving the Eastern Zhejiang Canal in Qing dynasty, not comparable to the hundreds of vessels in the Southern Song dynasty. Particularly in the late Qing dynasty, with the emergence of steamships and the Xiaoshan-Ningbo Railway, the Eastern Zhejiang Canal was gradually replaced. After the Chinese Communist Revolution, the Eastern Zhejiang Canal was renovated several times. The channels were dredged and new facilities were built to facilitate transportation and irrigation.

At the end of the 20th century, due to the development of Ningbo port, the transportation cost increased, prompting the reconstruction of the Eastern Zhejiang Canal to be included on the political agenda. In 2009, the reconstruction of the Eastern Zhejiang Canal finished.

== Functions of the canal ==
The Eastern Zhejiang Canal mainly functioned in four ways throughout its history: shipping, irrigation, the Caoyun system and water stations.

=== Shipping ===
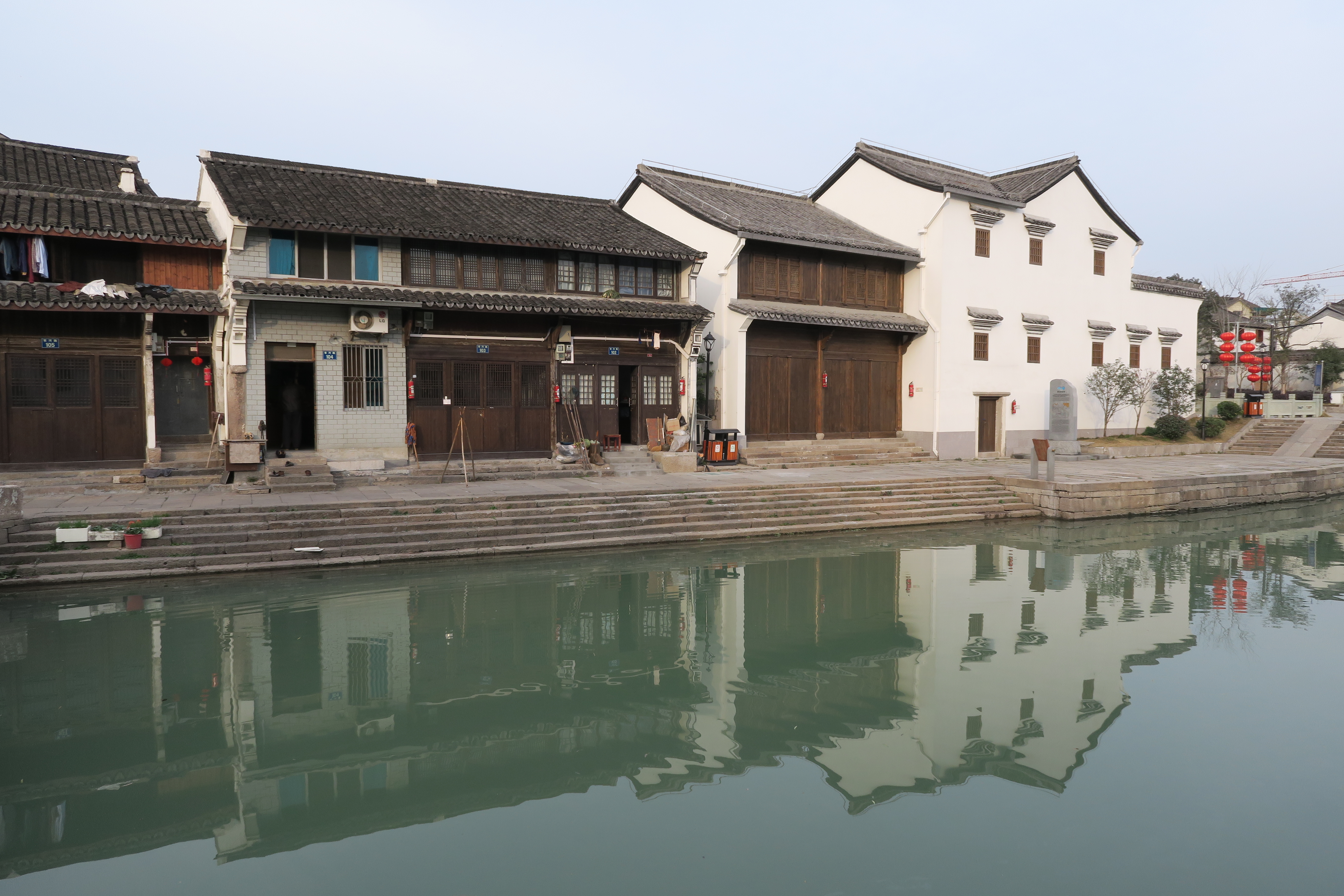
Relics of the Xixing Wharf

Shipping has been an important function of the Eastern Zhejiang Canal. In ancient times, ships from Eastern Zhejiang always went to Hangzhou by way of the canal to avoid the fierce tide of Hangzhou Bay (杭州湾). During the Southern Song dynasty (1127–1279), the canal became a significant channel for foreign trade. Exported products like porcelain were transported to Ningbo first via the canal then would be shipped to foreign countries by the Silk Road. Meanwhile, products from Japan, Vietnam, Goryeo and other countries were also transported to the capital city Lin’an from the canal. Foreign envoys always landed in Ningbo, then travelled to Lin’an via the canal. In the Ming dynasty (1368–1644), Ningbo was the only port receiving Japanese tributary ships, the tribute then transported to the capital city by the canal. Besides official trades, shipping for civil use was also developed along the canal. At the end of the 1950s, short-distance shipping still thrived. The canal's shipping function was largely replaced by the 1980s with the improvement of road conditions.

=== Irrigation ===
Irrigating cultivated land on both sides of the canal was another crucial function of the Eastern Zhejiang Canal. The Xixing Canal, which was built by the Western Jin dynasty (265–316), was mainly used for irrigation. During the Southern dynasties (420–589), four yandai structures (a kind of earth dam used for raising upstream water level to benefit shipping or irrigation in ancient China) were constructed. In the tenth year of Yuanhe of the Tang dynasty (815), canals in Jiangnan (Chinese: 江南) area were repaired. From this, the water storage and drainage functions of the Eastern Zhejiang Canal improved. From the Song dynasty (960–1279) to the Ming dynasty (1368–1644) and the Qing dynasty (1644–1912), the water storage and drainage facilities of the canal's river network went through repair each period. This largely completed the canal's gate dam control system.

=== Caoyun system ===
Eastern Zhejiang was important in collecting and transporting tribute grain, and the canal had a significant role in this process. In the Tang dynasty, canal facilities began to be controlled by officials; tribute grain was first shipped to Xixing via the canal, then sent by the Qiantang River to finally arrive in the capital city by way of the Beijing–Hangzhou Grand Canal. During the Southern Song dynasty (1127–1279), substantial goods and materials from the eastern Zhejiang area like salt and rice together with the tribute grain from Fujian Province (which arrived by sea transport) were shipped to Lin’an via the canal. Later, during the Yuan dynasty (1271–1368), tribute grain started to be shipped in a co-operative sea-river joint transportation method. The institution which managed the sea transportation of tribute grain was established, and the tribute grain which was transported by the canal would be shipped by sea after it arrived at Ningbo (called Qingyuan at that time) Port. Until the Ming dynasty (1368–1644), the Caoyun system of the Eastern Zhejiang Canal was still comparatively developed. During the reign of Xianfeng emperor in the Qing dynasty, once again, it was decreed that tribute grain was to be transported by sea and the canal started to lose its function in the Caoyun system.

=== Postal service ===
The Eastern Zhejiang Canal served as an important postal route. At the base of the canal there was a station called the Xixing Post. Official documents were sent to Shaoxing, Ningbo and Taizhou by post via the canal. The postal system was also responsible for service via delivery stores. In the Song dynasty (960–1279), 12 post houses were put up along the canal; these were reduced in number later in the Ming dynasty (1368–1644). After the twentieth year of Qianlong of the Qing dynasty, the Xixing Post was kept while setting up posts in other counties. In the thirty-second year of the reign of the Guangxu emperor, modern Chinese post was established and delivery stores abolished. In the third year of his reign, emperor Xuantong abdicated causing all post houses to close while certain post functions of the canal remained till the popularization of railways and roads.

Scholars such as Chen Qiaoyi, a professor from Zhejiang University, think the Eastern Zhejiang Canal should be included as part of ‘the Grand Canal of China’.

== Important remains ==
Along the Eastern Zhejiang Canal, you can find substantial cultural relics, including 3 national-level, nearly 20 provincial-level plus a number of city-level and county-level historical and cultural sites under protection. These are mainly water conservancy facilities, bridges and other utilities. Additionally, some ancient towns which are influenced by the canal also reside along both sides of the canal.

=== Water conservancy facilities ===
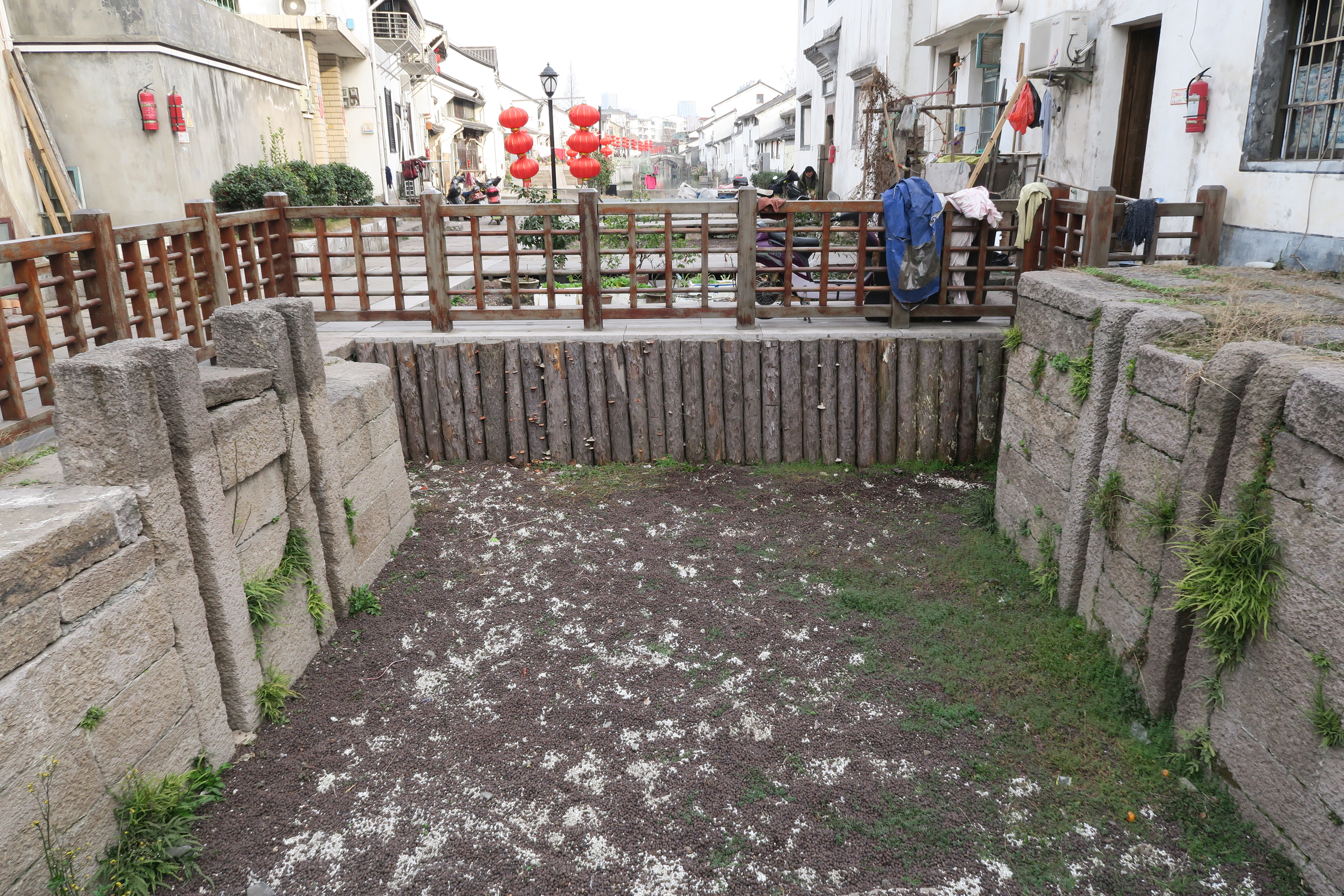
The relic of the Yongxing Gate

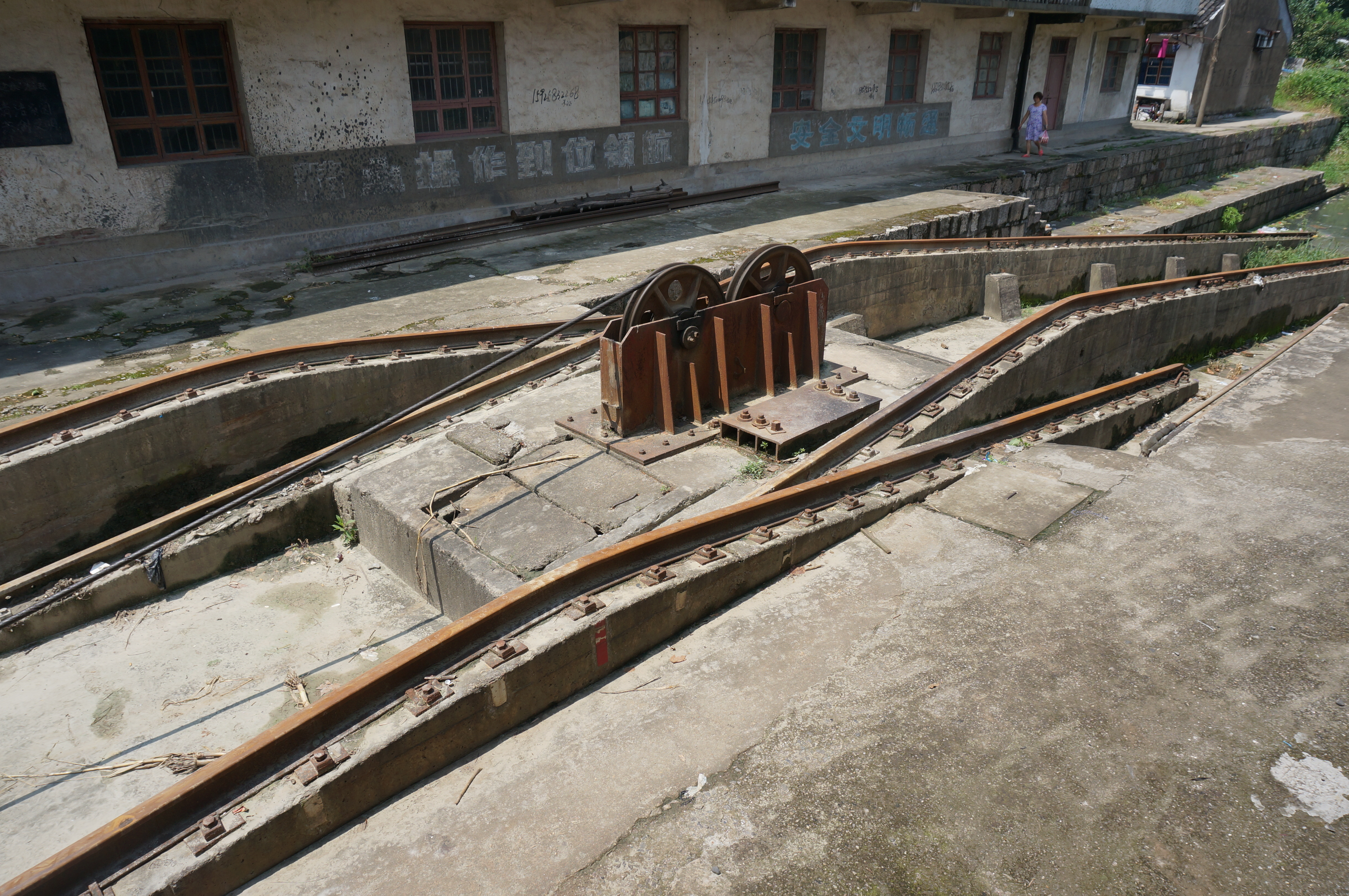
The bottom barrage of the old Cao'e Barrage

The Eastern Zhejiang Canal is made up of many natural rivers. To maintain the stable water levels and benefit agriculture along the banks, numerous water conservancy facilities were constructed along the canal. These are primarily composed of barrages, dams and gates. Among these, significant ones can be found on the central canal and tributaries of the canal such as the Yongxing Gate (located in Xiaoshan District, Hangzhou, Zhejiang Province), the Cao'e Barrage, the Lianghu Barrage, the Tongming Barrage, the Qingshui Gate (all located in Shangyu District, Shaoxing, Zhejiang Province), Doumen Gate, the Yunlou Xiaba Dam (both located in Yuyao, Zhejiang Province) and the Xidu Barrage (located in Ningbo, Zhejiang Province).

- The Yongxing Gate, which is also called the Longkou Gate, is located in Xixing. In the past, it was ten li (a Chinese unit of length, one li = 1/2 kilometre) away from Xiaoshan County and served as the western starting point of the canal. It used to be a barrage, which was then transformed into a gate in the fifteenth year during the reign of Wanli emperor to resist the tides from the Qiantang River (Chinese: 钱塘江). You can still see its remains today.
- The Cao'e Barrage lies on the west bank of the Cao'e River. In ancient times, it was 90 li away from Shaoxing city and used to be a gate while it functions as a barrage nowadays. A ship lift now operates on the barrage.
- The Lianghu Barrage, which lies on the east bank of the Cao'e River, used to connect the Cao'e River and the Sishili River. It moved multiple times in history and the current location is in Wailianghu Village, Lianghu Town. Due to the reconstruction of the canal, this barrage is not in use any more.
- The Tongming Barrage is located in Fenghui Town, Shangyu District, Shaoxing. There are two barrages near it, named the North Barrage and the South Barrage respectively.
- The Qingshui Barrage is located in Haoba town, Shangyu District, Shaoxing. During the period of Jiatai in the Southern Song dynasty, the Qingshui Sluice Gate was built, with a sluice gate beneath. Since then, it was reconstructed during every dynasty.
- The Doumen Barrage is located in Yuyao. Its history can be seen in record from the Southern Song dynasty. Its old barrage still remains today but is of no use. In 1983, the ship lift was installed. Its history is a reflection of the continual evolution of the canal's water conservancy facilities.
- The Xiaba Dam is located in Yuyao and is also named Dajiangkou Dam. It was 40 li away from Yuyao county in ancient times and was a necessary route to take from Ningbo to Shaoxing, connecting the Shibali River and the Yao River. Its remains still exist today and a ship lift was built later.
- The Xidu Barrage also called the Daxi Dam, which is located in Haishu District, Ningbo. It was originally built in the Song dynasty while the current construction was built during the period of Zhengtong in the Ming dynasty. As a connection of the Yao River and the Xitang River, it served as an important path from Mingzhou to the capital in ancient times. It has been preserved well.

Currently, these constructions are included in the sixth batch of historical and cultural sites protected at the provincial level in Zhejiang Provence under the following projects – The Water Conservancy and Shipping Facilities of the Qiantang River and Canal Ports, The Water Conservancy, Shipping and Service Facilities of the Cao'e River's Ports, Relic Sites Group of the Tongming Barrage, The Water Conservancy and Shipping Facilities from Yiting to Wufu, The Qingshui Gate and Management Facilities, The Water Conservancy and Shipping Facilities of the Yao river and Relevant Heritage Groups etc.

=== Ancient towpaths ===
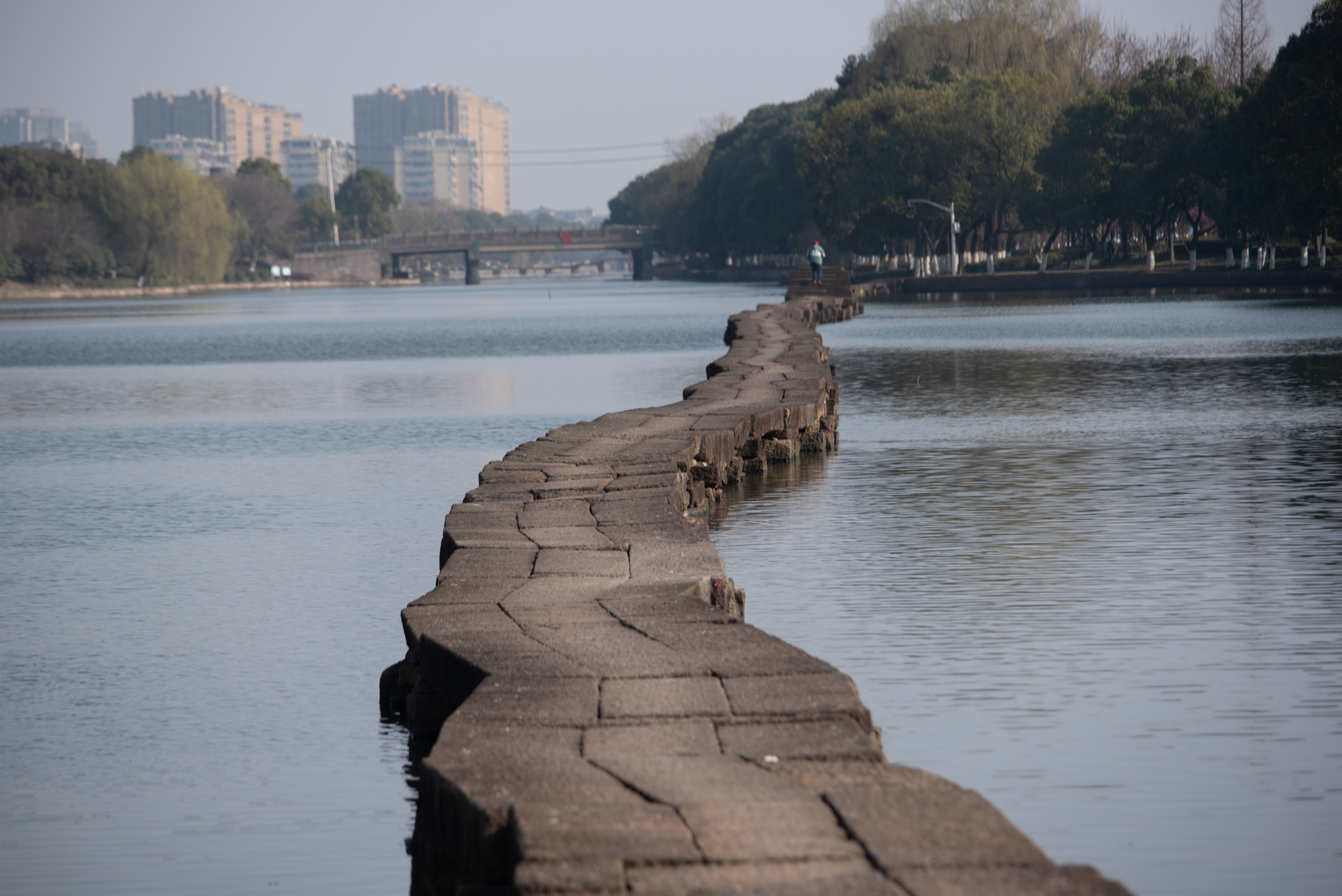
Ancient towpath in Keqiao, Shaoxing

A towpath is the road that canal boat trackers walk along as they towed boats. There are many towpaths located in different reaches while mainly converge in Xiaoshan and Shaoxing. These ancient towpaths were originally built in the tenth year of Yuanhe in the Tang dynasty (815). They cover nearly one hundred li in total. Especially the towpath which connects the Qianqing Slab Bridge and the Shangxie Bridge, with a length of 7.5 kilometers, is well preserved. These towpaths are either against the canal bank on one side or surrounded by the canal on both sides. The latter form can be divided into entity towpath and stone pier towpath styles. You can always see bridges located after certain distances as they help ships pass through safely. These are well known as the White-Jade-liked Long Embankment.

Currently, the towpath, located in Shaoxing, connecting the slab bridge in Qingqian Town and the Shangxie Bridge in Keqiao, is recognized as a major historical and cultural site protected at the national level. Additionally, the Xiaoshan Towpath, the Yuhou Bridge Towpath (located in Shaoxing), the Gaobu Towpath (located in Shaoxing) and the towpath in Shangyu are protected as historical and cultural sites at the provincial level in Zhejiang Province.

=== Ancient bridges ===
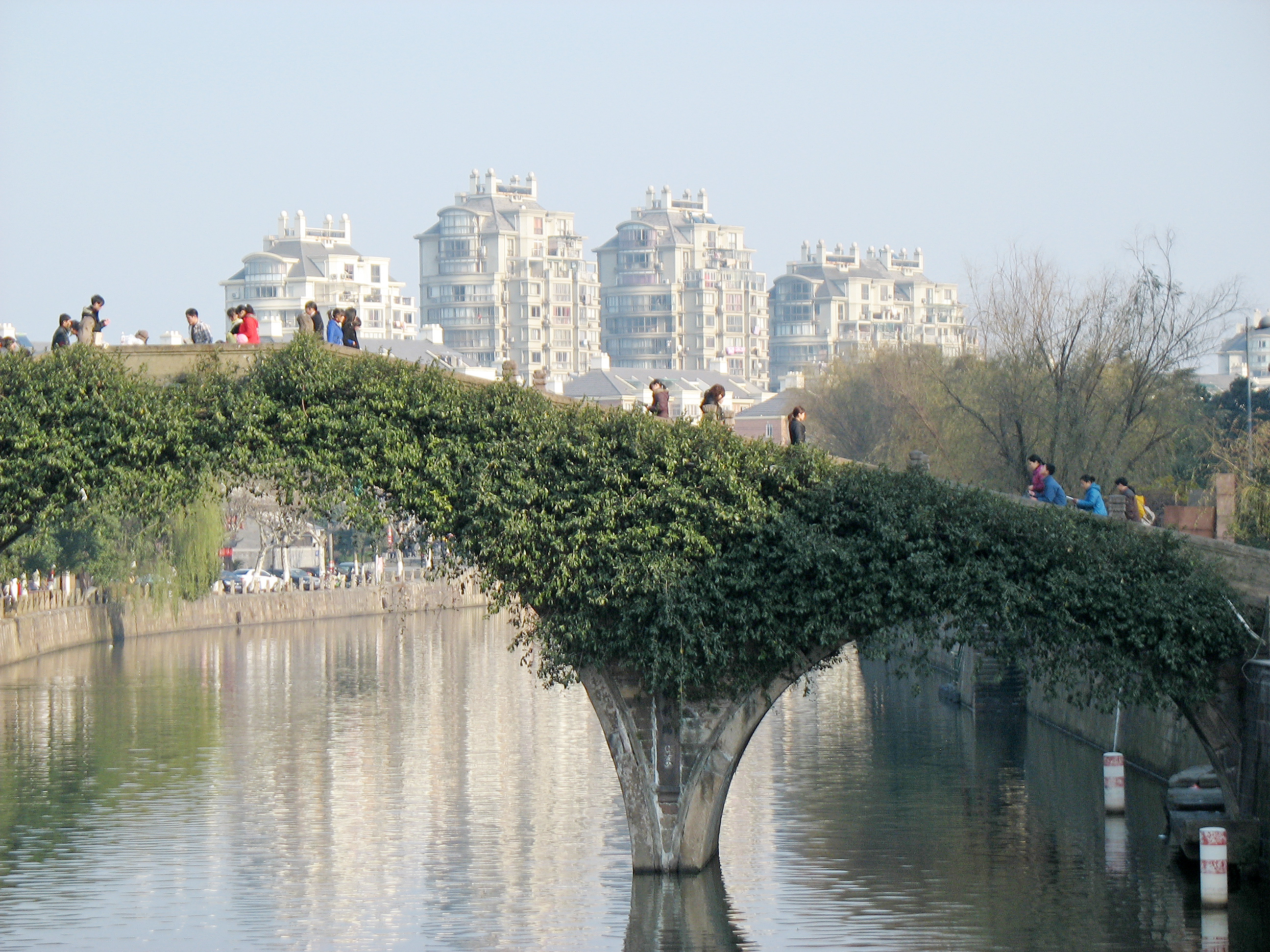
The Tongji Bridge of Yuyao

Numerous ancient bridges stand across the Eastern Zhejiang Canal with various bridge forms, including semicircular arch, seven-polygonal arch, U-shaped arch, overpass and other forms. Many bridges are now protected as historical and cultural sites. Among these bridges, under the name of Ancient Bridge Groups of Shaoxing, some bridges of this city are protected as key historical and cultural sites at national level.

- The Bazi Bridge is located in Yuecheng District, Shaoxing. It was originally constructed in the Southern Song dynasty and the bridge was reinforced in 1982. It stands across three water courses with two slopes on both sides.
- The Taiping Bridge is located in Shaoxing. Its construction was first started in the forty-eighth year during the reign of the Wanli emperor and was reconstructed in the eighth year during the reign of the Xianfeng emperor. It is a combination of single-span bridge and eight-span stone beam bridge design. You can see gallery roads beneath the bridge. Its construction form is viewed as representative of early overpasses in ancient China.
- The Guangning Bridge is located in Shaoxing, which was originally constructed in the Northern Song dynasty and reconstructed during the reign of Wanli in the Ming dynasty. It is the longest single-span seven-polygonal arch in Shaoxing.
- The Jingkou Bridge is located in Keqiao District, Shaoxing. It is a combination of three-span U-shaped arch bridge and three-span stone beam bridge design. The current bridge was reconstructed during the reign of the Xuantong emperor in the Qing dynasty.
- The Rongguang Bridge is a single-arch stone bridge from the Chenghua period, located in Keqiao District, Shaoxing.
- The Tongji Bridge is located in Yuyao, the current bridge was reconstructed during the reign of the Yongzheng emperor in the Qing dynasty. It is a stone arch bridge which is made up of two piers and three spans and became famous because of its big central/main span. People used to call it the Most Prominent Bridge of Eastern Zhejiang.

=== Ancient towns ===
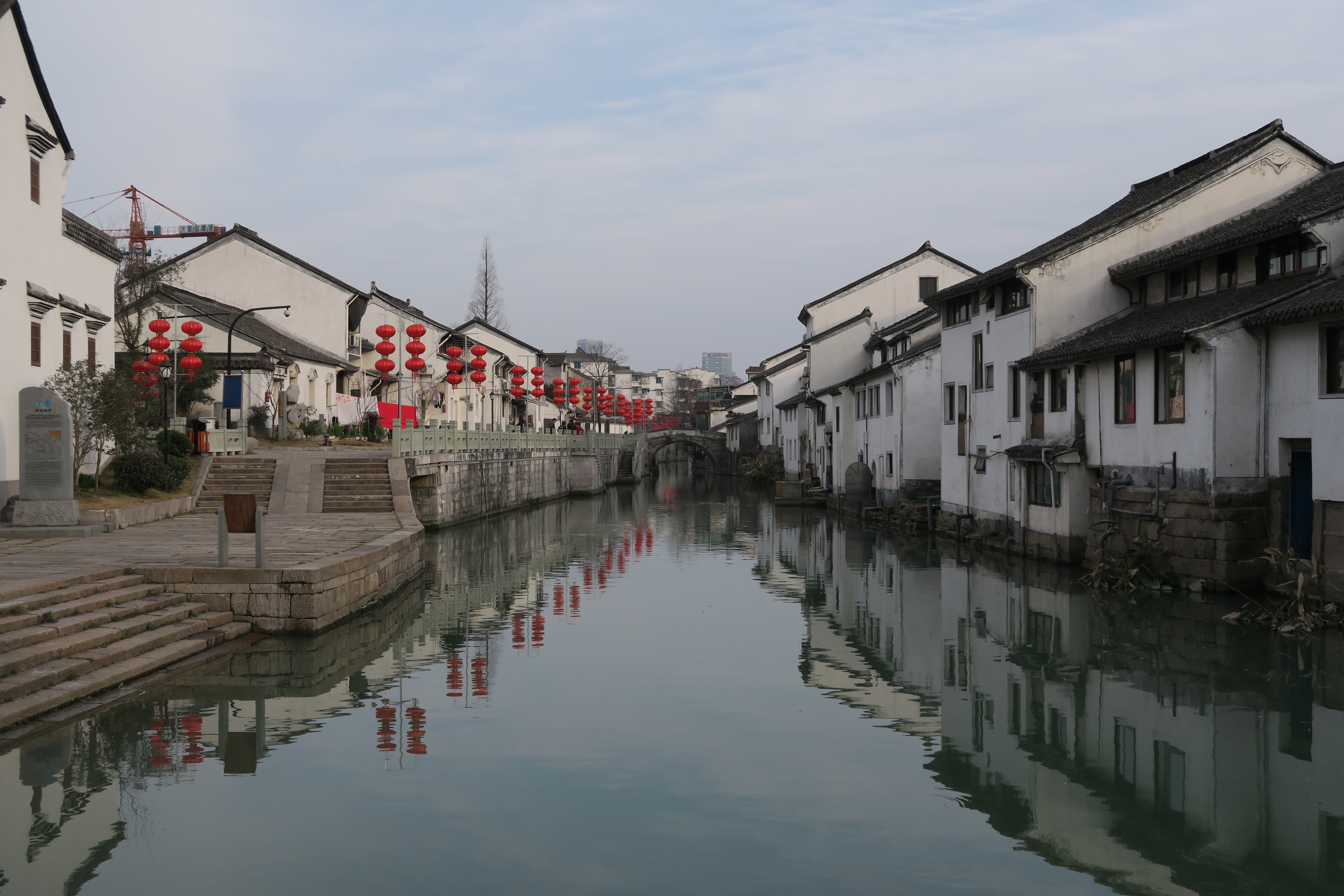
The Xixing Ancient Town which located along the canal

The Eastern Zhejiang Canal deeply influences many cities and towns on both its sides. Cities that it passed by included Xiaoshan, Shanyin, Kuaiji, Shangyu (refer to old maps), Yuyao, Cixi (refer to old maps) and Ningbo. Most of them used to install water gates to give convenience to the incoming and outgoing of ships. With the development of modern cities, most of these cities or towns have undergone drastic changes. However, some ancient towns still exist until day due to insufficient re-development.

- The Xixing Ancient Town is the western starting point of the canal and its appearance was mainly finalized in the Ming dynasty. Many people ran a special business called Guotangxing, it was a canal transportation business that only existed in Zhejiang Province.
- The Cicheng Ancient County used to be the county of Cixi, Ningbo. It was originally constructed in the twenty-sixth year of Kaiyuan in the Tang dynasty. It shows people the typical county construction style of the Jiangnan area (Jiangnan means area of the southern side of the Yangtze River while currently it refers to the area between the southern side of the Yangtze River and the northern side of the Qiantang River, namely an area covering Jiangsu Province, Shanghai, Zhejiang Province).

=== Other relics ===
- The Xixing Guotangxing is a kind of transit business of both people and goods in Xixing. It appeared during the reign of Wanli in the Ming dynasty and reached the most prosperous time from the end of the Qing dynasty to the beginning of the Republic of China (1912–1949). At its peak, the business had 72.5 stores, while it declined during the time of the Second Sino-Japanese War (July 7, 1937 – September 9, 1945). Currently, partial constructions used in this old type business are protected as historical and cultural sites at a provincial level in Zhejiang Province.
- The Jian Lake is located in Shaoxing, which was originally excavated in the Han dynasty (206 BC–220 AD) and undertook the important function of restoring water and controlling flood. After the Southern Song dynasty, due to cultivation, the size of the lake gradually shrank, its functions thus lost.
- The Shuize Stone Tablet of the Pingqiao River is located in Ningbo which was constructed in the Ming dynasty. The tablet used to be underwater with a Chinese character ‘平’ (which means flat and peaceful) carved in it and serve as an observation facility of water level.

== Cultural influence ==
In the Chinese legend the Butterfly Lovers, the protagonist Liang Shanbo looked for Zhu Yingtai along the Eastern Zhejiang Canal. More than forty famous poets from the Tang dynasty had visited the west part of the canal, including Li Bai (701–762), Du Fu, He Zhizhang, Wang Wei, etc. Thus, the canal constitutes A Road of Tang Poetry in the Eastern Zhejiang along with the Cao'e River (曹娥江) After the Tang dynasty, many famous men of letters have since passed the canal, including Lu You, Fan Chengda, Qin Guan, Zhu Yizun, Lu Xun, a number of great works were created and left till now. In the year of 1488, because of heavy storms, the Korean official Choe Bu (1454–1504) drifted to Taizhou, China. Later, he went to Hangzhou from Ningbo via the canal and came back to Korea from Beijing by way of the Beijing–Hangzhou Grand Canal. He wrote a book named the Geumnam pyohaerok (錦南漂海錄; 금남표해록; lit. 'A Record of Drifting Across the Southern Brocade Sea') to record his journey. This book provides an important account of the Ming dynasty for historians.

== Contemporary development ==
In 2007, the Ministry of Transport of the People's Republic of China enacted a document named "The National Inland Waterway and Port Layout Plan." In this document, the canal composing of the Eastern Zhejiang Canal and the Beijing–Hangzhou Grand Canal was recognized as the most important waterway in the Yangtze River Delta. The proposal of reconstructing the Eastern Zhejiang Canal was raised in 1983. Back then, after partial construction, the navigation capacity remained 40 tons. In 2002, to manage problems including too many barrages on the canal and the low navigation tonnage which would not satisfy the demand of modern logistics, the reconstruction project of the canal began. This project set grade four waterways (which can navigate 500-ton freighters) as the standard and took the Sanbo Navigation Lock which located on the west bank of the Qiantang River as its starting point. The canal would flow through the Qiantang River, the Puyang River, the Xixiao River, the Cao’e River, the Sishili River, the Yao River and the Yong River and would finally empty into the East China Sea in the mouth of the Yong River. More than 130 bridges and 8 navigation blocks were constructed in this project. Some reconstructions were also completed along the canal, including railways, roads, constructions which would be affected by this project and aids for navigation. By September 2009, this project was completed. It turned out to be the single inland waterway reconstruction project with the biggest investment scale in the history of mainland China. Before the completion, in December 2007, partial canal had been put into use, especially the part in Hangzhou and Shaoxing, which had already become the busiest waterway. However, in Ningbo, due to bridges across the Yao River not satisfying the demand of navigation, large investments needed to be put into reconstruction. The uncompleted canal of Ningbo used to attract attention from the media in mainland China.

== World Heritage ==
In 2006, the Beijing–Hangzhou Grand Canal started to apply to be classified as a World Heritage Site. At the very beginning, only the Canal of the Sui and Tang dynasties and the Canal of the Ming and the Qing dynasties were included in the plan. With the appeal of relevant experts and media, in November 2008, the Eastern Zhejiang Canal was brought into this application. Shan Jixiang, the director of the State Administration of Cultural Heritage back then, used to comment on this alteration as, the join of the Eastern Zhejiang Canal made the Beijing–Hangzhou Grand Canal connect to the maritime silk road. The starting point of the Canal of the Sui and Tang dynasties, Luoyang, is also the starting point of the land silk road. All these would form ‘a remarkable and inevitable integration which is made up of culture, commodity and information and a big circle’.

In 2004, in the 38th time of the World Heritage Committee conference, which was held in Doha, the Beijing–Hangzhou Grand Canal, which included the Eastern Zhejiang Canal was officially added into the Lists of World Heritage Sites. The world heritage sites which were listed include:

- The Xiaoshao Canal, including Waterways of the Xiaoshao Canal, the Xixing wharf and relics of Guotangxing, the Bazi Bridge The community of the Bazi Bridge, the ancient towpaths of Shaoxing.
- The Yuyu Canal
- The Ningbo part of the Eastern Zhejiang Canal
- The Mouth of the Three Rivers of Ningbo, including the East Zhejiang Maritime Affairs/Folk Custom Museum (Chinese: 庆安会馆)
