= Wangtan, Zhejiang =

Wangtan 王坛镇
- Town
- Location in Zhejiang
- Coordinates: 29°47′07″N 120°40′33″E
- Country: People's Republic of China
- Province: Zhejiang
- Prefecture-level city: Shaoxing
- District: Keqiao District
- Time zone: UTC+8 (China Standard)

Wangtan (simplified Chinese: 王坛; traditional Chinese: 王壇; pinyin: Wángtán) is a town in Keqiao District, Shaoxing, Zhejiang, China. As of 2020, it administers Shunjiangyuan Residential Community (舜江源社区) and the following 24 villages:

- Wangtan Village
- Zhaohu Village (肇湖村)
- Kanshang Village (坎上村)
- Shadi Village (沙地村)
- Jiangxiang Village (蒋相村)
- Tenghao Village (腾豪村)
- Wangcheng Village (王城村)
- Dong Village (东村)
- Changling Village (长岭村)
- Shu Village (舒村)
- Shangwang Village (上王村)
- Zhangjiang Village (张蒋村)
- Sun'ao Village (孙岙村)
- Yuzhai Village (喻宅村)
- Yinsha Village (银沙村)
- Danjia Village (丹家村)
- Xinjian Village (新建村)
- Qingtan Village (青坛村)
- Xinhua Village (新华村)
- Yuelian Village (越联村)
- Nan'an Village (南岸村)
- Xinlian Village (新联村)
- Shunhuang Village (舜皇村)
- Wanqiao Village (万乔村)
