= Jiedu Bridge =

Jiedu Bridge 接渡桥
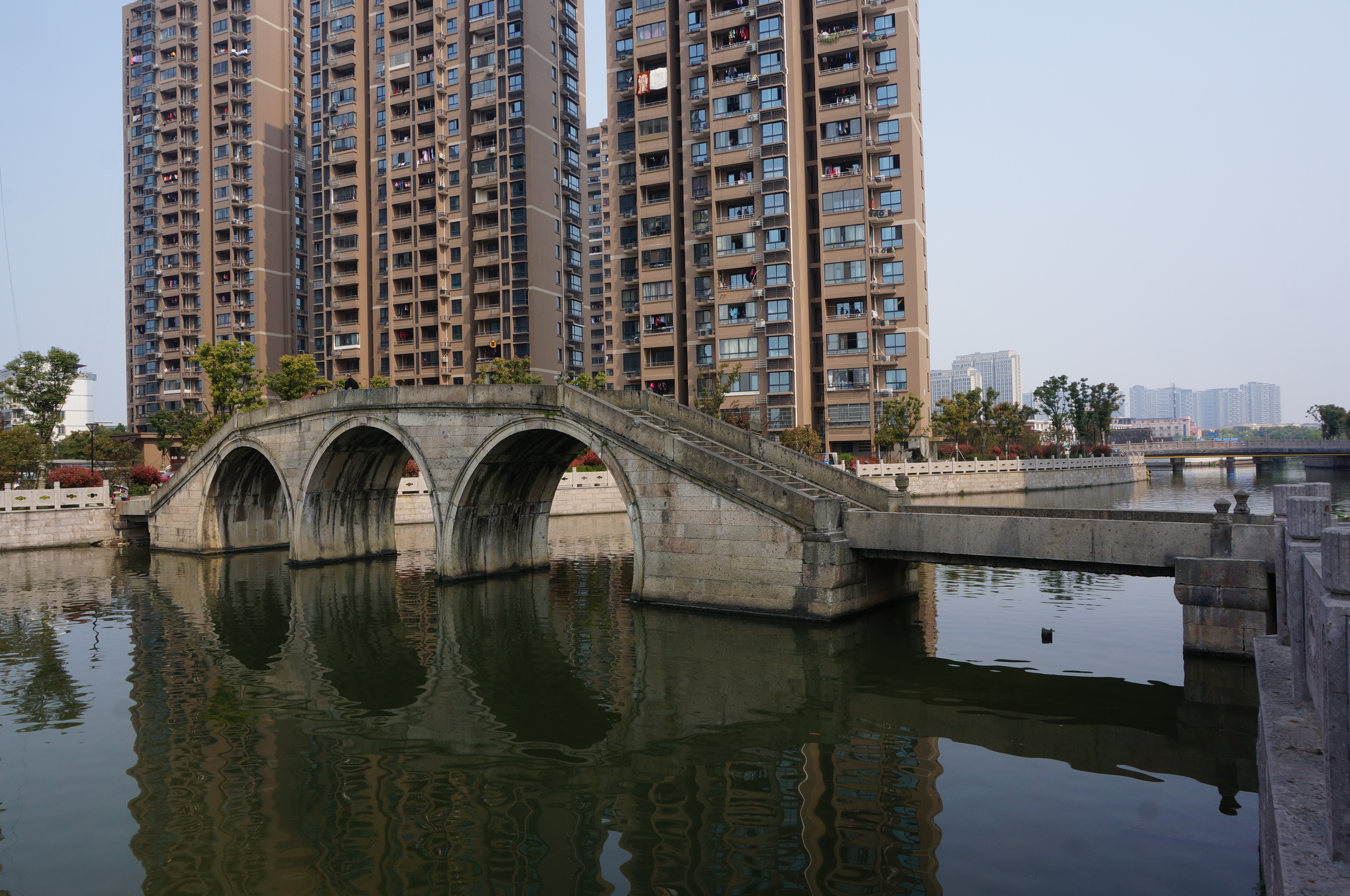
- Jiedu Bridge in March 2016
- Coordinates: 30°04′43″N 120°28′13″E
- Carries: Pedestrians
- Crosses: Jilong River
- Locale: Keyan Subdistrict, Keqiao District of Shaoxing, Zhejiang, China

Characteristics
- Design: Arch bridge
- Material: Stone
- Total length: 50 metres (160 ft)
- Width: 3.2 metres (10 ft)

History
- Rebuilt: Qing dynasty (1644–1911)

The Jiedu Bridge (simplified Chinese: 接渡桥; traditional Chinese: 接渡橋; pinyin: Jiēdù Qiáo) is a historic stone arch bridge over the Jilong River (鸡笼江; 'Chicken Coop River') in Keyan Subdistrict, Keqiao District of Shaoxing, Zhejiang, China.

== History ==
Jiedu Bridge was originally built in the Qing dynasty (1644–1911). On 6 May 2013, it was listed among the seventh batch of "Major National Historical and Cultural Sites in Zhejiang" by the State Council of China.

== Gallery ==
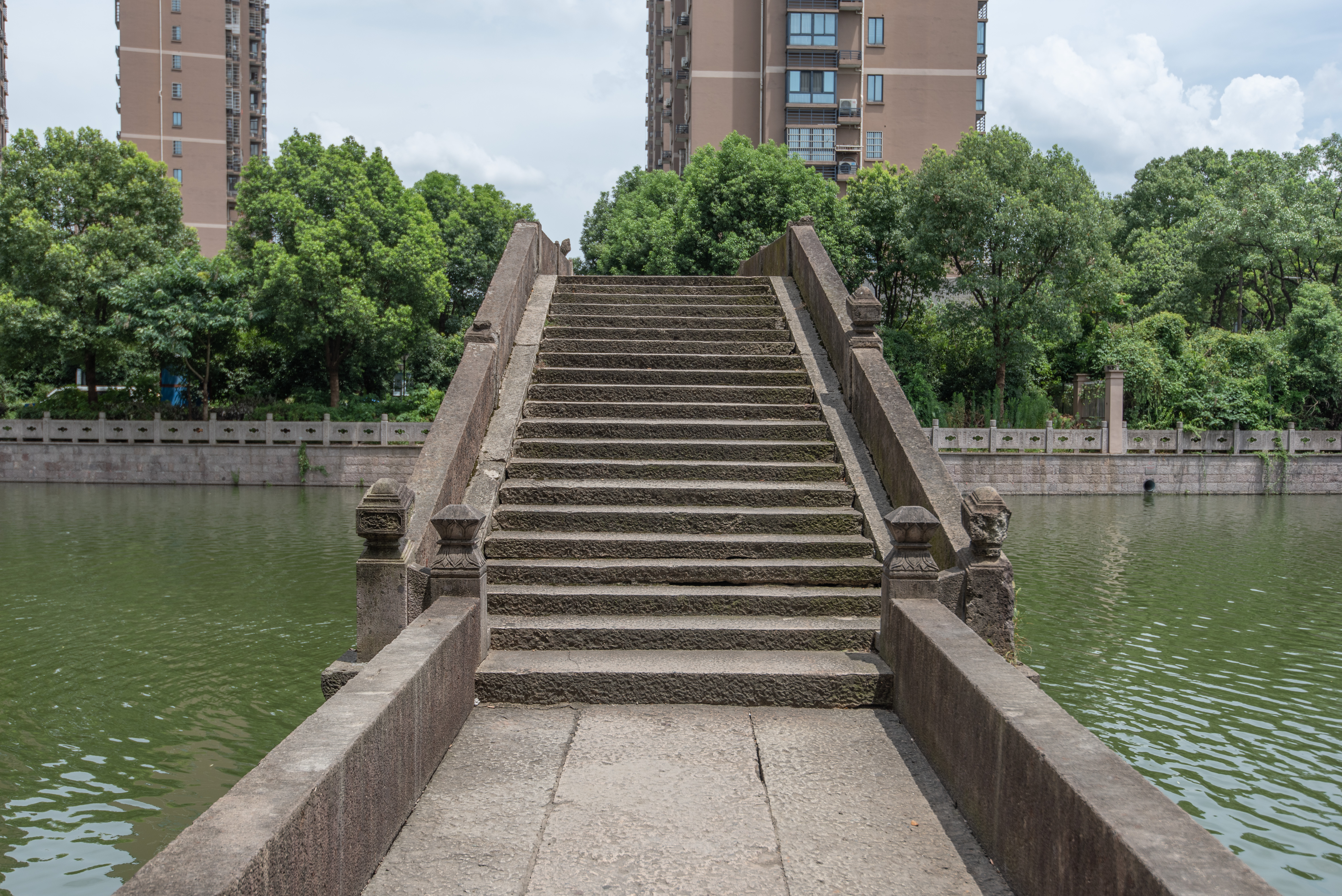
Jiedu Bridge in July 2021

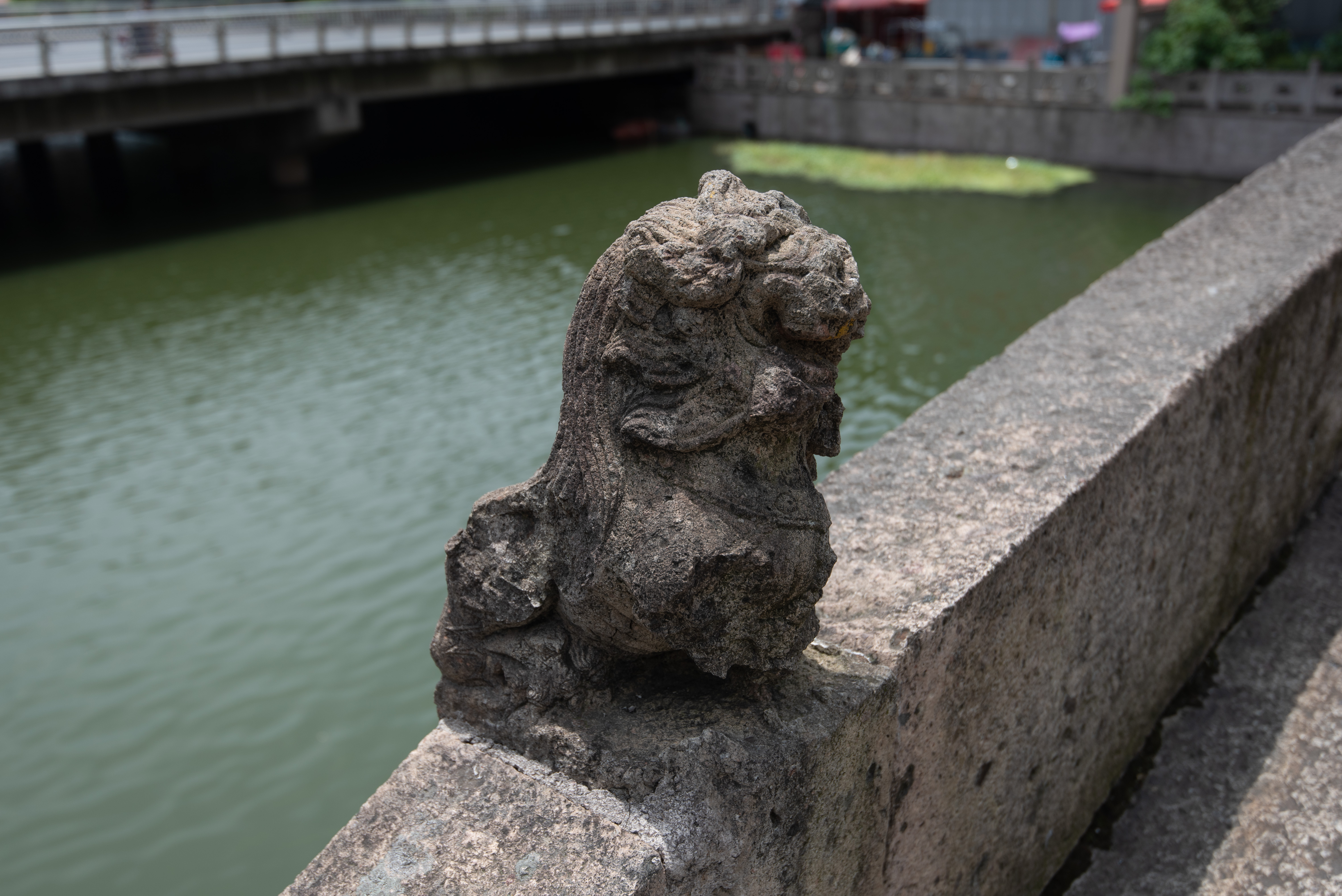
Stone lion on the bridge

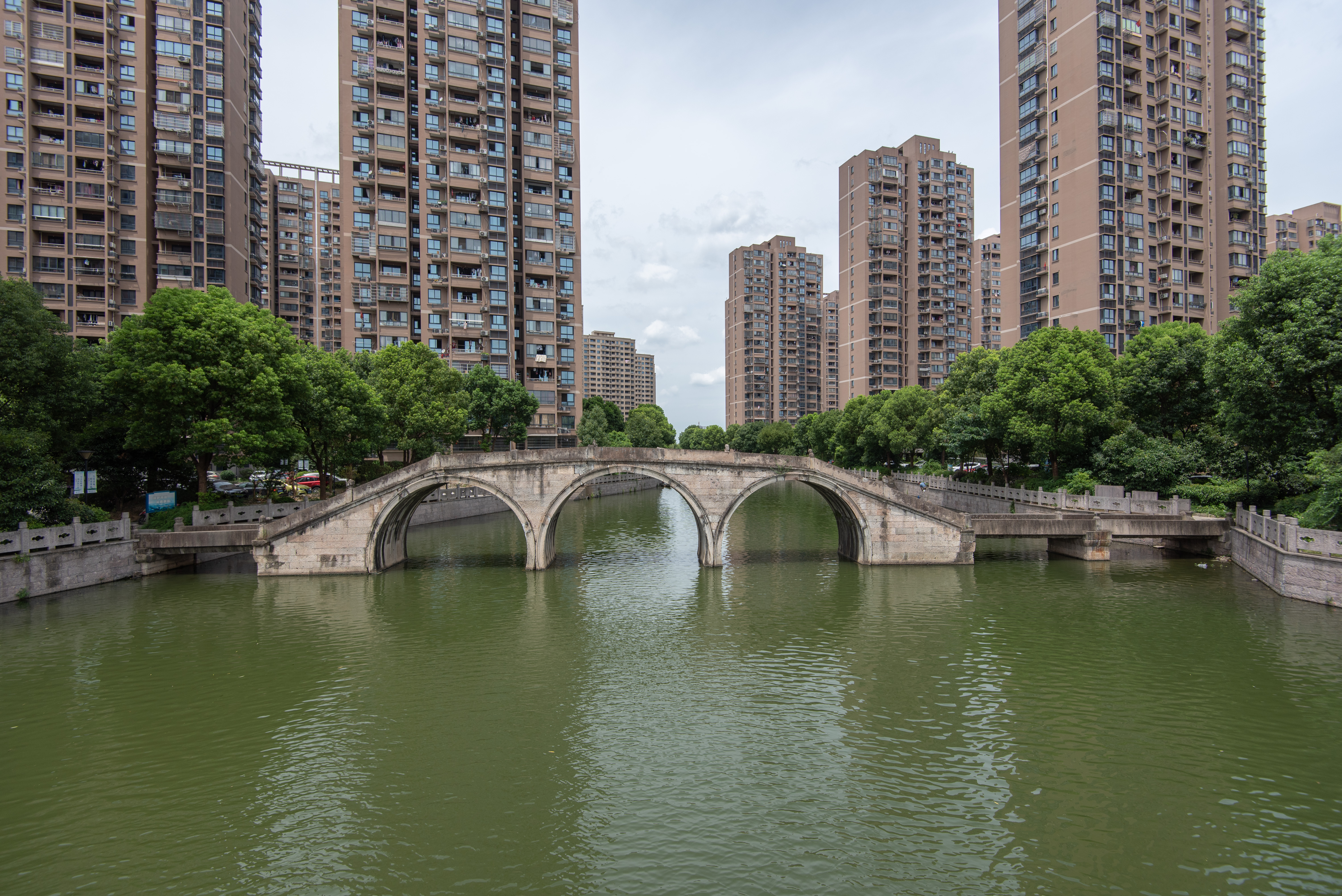
Jiedu Bridge in July 2021
