= History of transport in China =

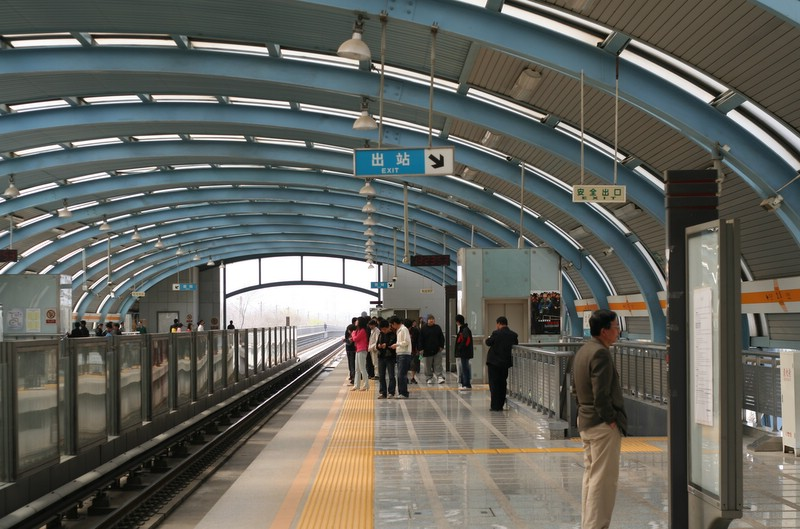
Beijing Subway, Longze station

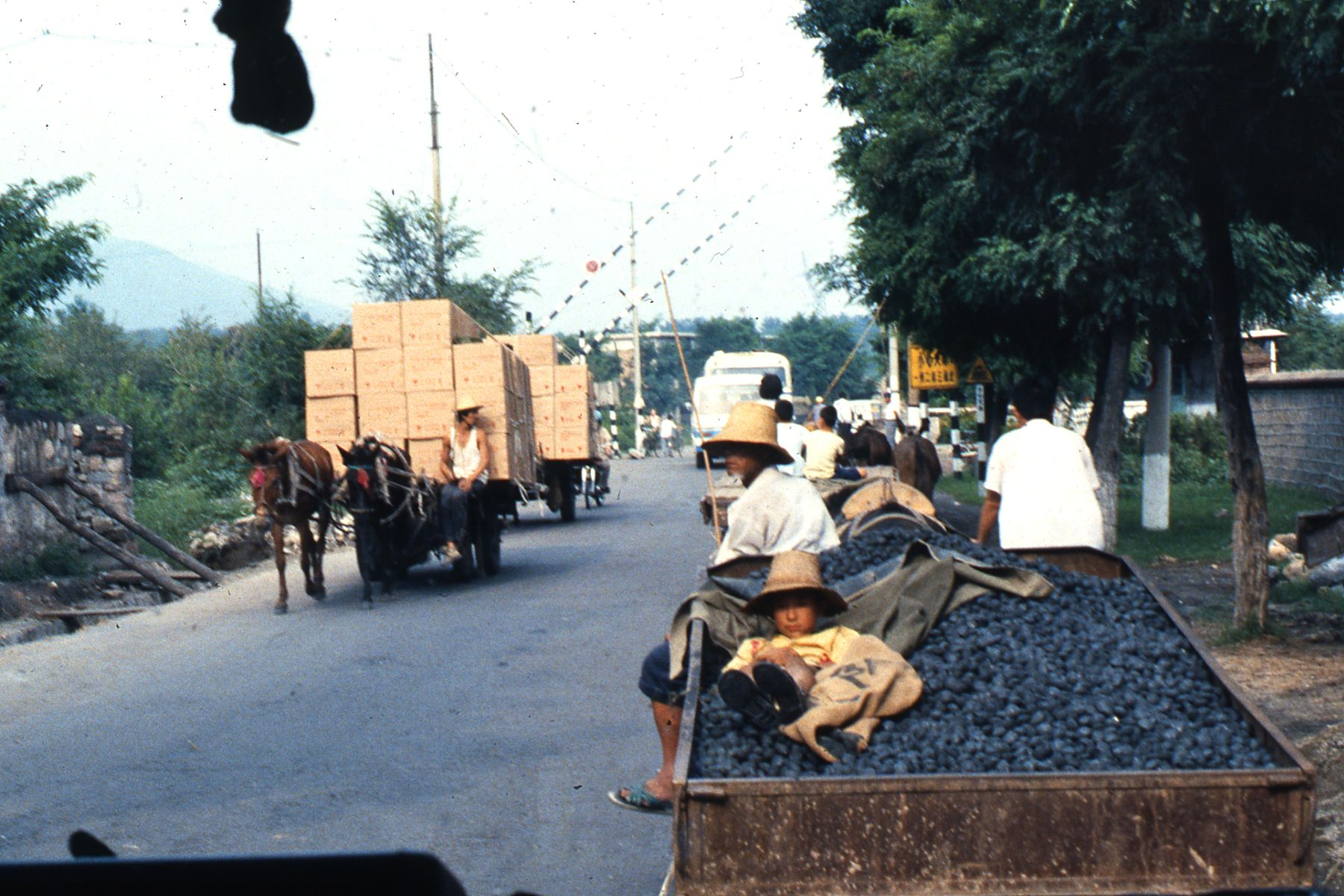
Horse-drawn conveyances bearing goods and coal on a road in China, 1987.

Since 2018, transport occupied a relatively low priority in China's national development. In the twenty-five years that followed the founding of the People's Republic in 1949, China's transportation network was built into a partially modern but somewhat inefficient system. The drive to modernize the transport system, that began in 1978, required a sharp acceleration in investment. Though despite increased investment and development in the 1980s, the transport sector was strained by the rapid expansion of production and the exchange of goods.

Inadequate transport systems hindered the movement of coal from mine to user, the transport of agricultural and light industrial products from rural to urban areas, and the delivery of imports and exports. As a result, the underdeveloped transport system constrained the pace of economic development throughout the country. In the 1980s the updating of transport systems was given priority, and investment and improvements were made throughout the transport sector.

== Bridges ==
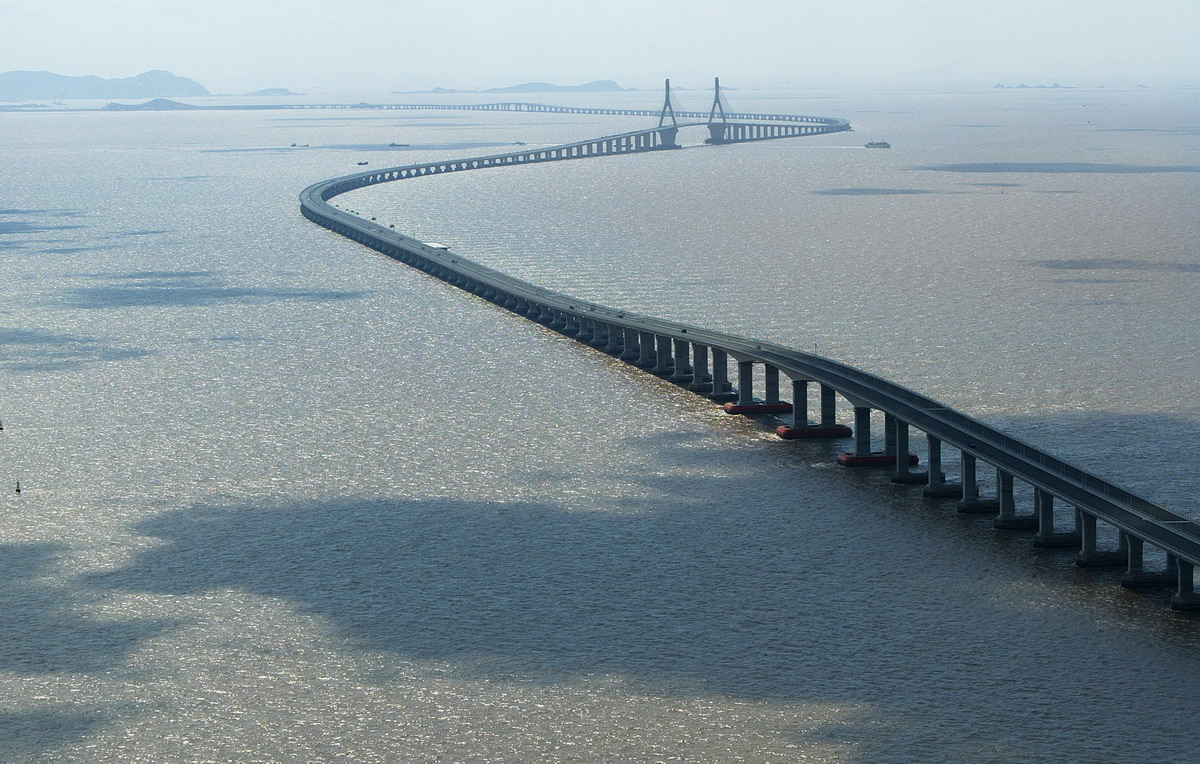
Donghai Bridge

In the late 1980s, China had more than 140,000 highway bridges. Their length totaled almost 4,000 kilometers. Among the best known were the Yellow River Bridge in Inner Mongolia, the Liu Jiang Bridge in Guangxi, the Ou Jiang Bridge in Zhejiang, the Quanzhou Bridge in Fujian, and four large bridges along the Guangzhou-Shenzhen highway. Five major bridges — including China's longest highway bridge, the 5,560-meter-long Yellow River Bridge at Zhengzhou — were under construction during the mid-1980s, and a 10,282-meter-long railroad bridge across the Yellow River on the Shandong-Henan border was completed in 1985.

== Inland waterways ==
China's canal system, whose greatest accomplishment was the Sui dynasty's 1,794-kilometer (1,115 mi) 7th-century Grand Canal between Hangzhou and Beijing, was an essential aspect of its civilization, used for irrigation, flood control, taxation, commercial and military transport, and colonization of new lands from the Zhou dynasty until the end of the imperial era. There was widespread destruction of the canal system throughout the wars of the first half of the 20th century. Beginning in 1960 the network of navigable inland waterways decreased because of the construction of dams and irrigation works and the increasing sedimentation. But by the early 1980s, as the railroads became increasingly congested, the authorities came to see water transport as a much less expensive alternative to new road and railroad construction.

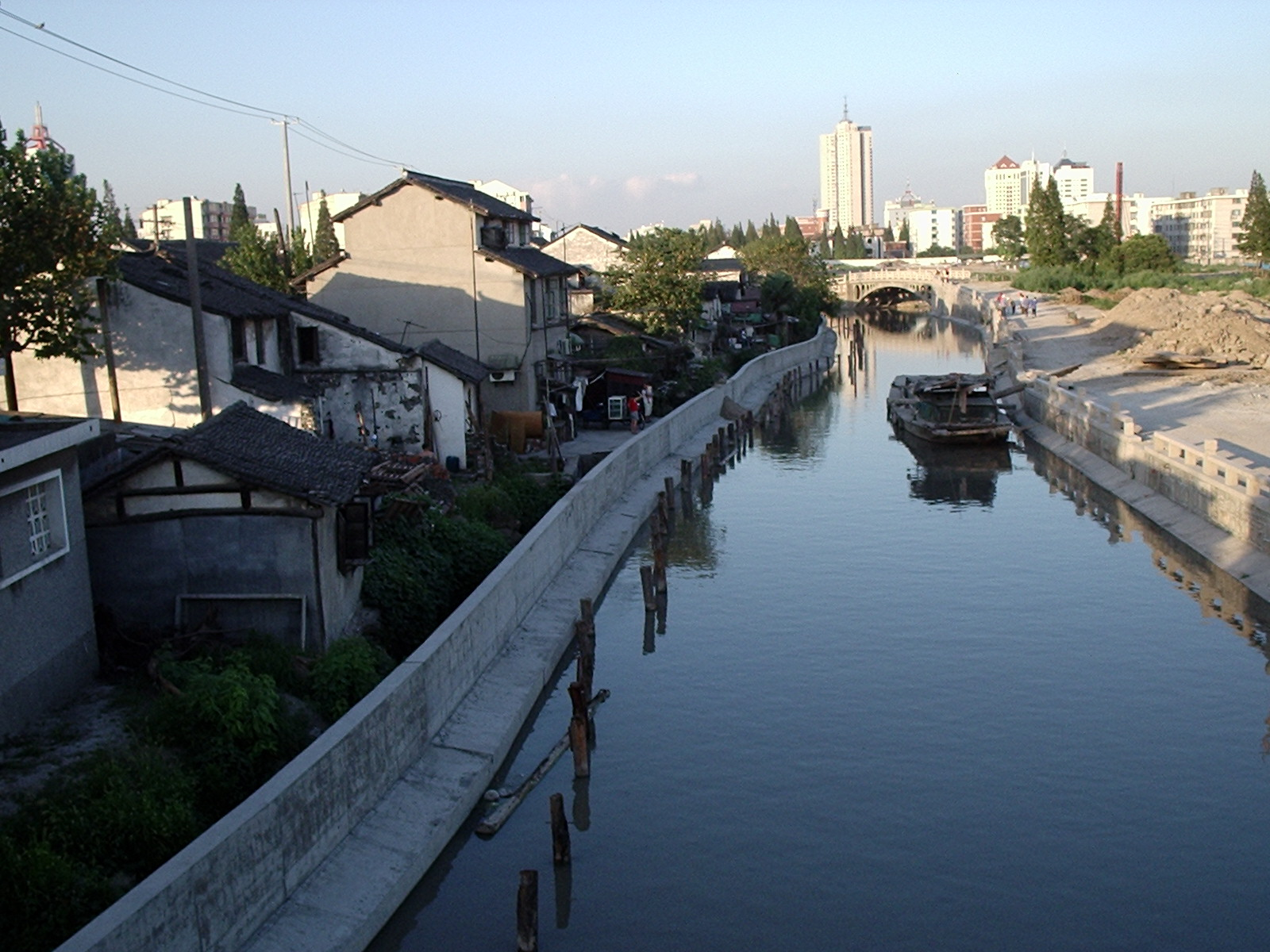
A canal in Jiading, Shanghai

The central government set out to overhaul the inefficient inland waterway system and called upon localities to play major roles in managing and financing most of the projects. By 1984 China's longest river, the Yangtze River, with a total of 70,000 kilometers of waterways open to shipping on its main stream and 3,600 kilometers on its tributaries, became the nation's busiest shipping lane, carrying 72 percent of China's total waterborne traffic. An estimated 340,000 people and 170,000 boats were engaged in the water transport business. More than 800 shipping enterprises and 60 shipping companies transported over 259 million tons of cargo on the Yangtze River and its tributaries in 1984. Nationally, in 1985 the inland waterways carried some 434 million tons of cargo. In 1986 there were approximately 138,600 kilometers of inland waterways, 79 percent of which were navigable.

The Cihuai Canal in northern Anhui opened to navigation in 1984. This 134-kilometer canal linking the Ying River, a major tributary of the Huai River, with the Huai He's main course, had an annual capacity of 600,000 tons of cargo. The canal promoted the flow of goods between Anhui and neighboring provinces and helped to develop the Huai River Plain, one of China's major grain-producing areas.

== Maritime shipping ==
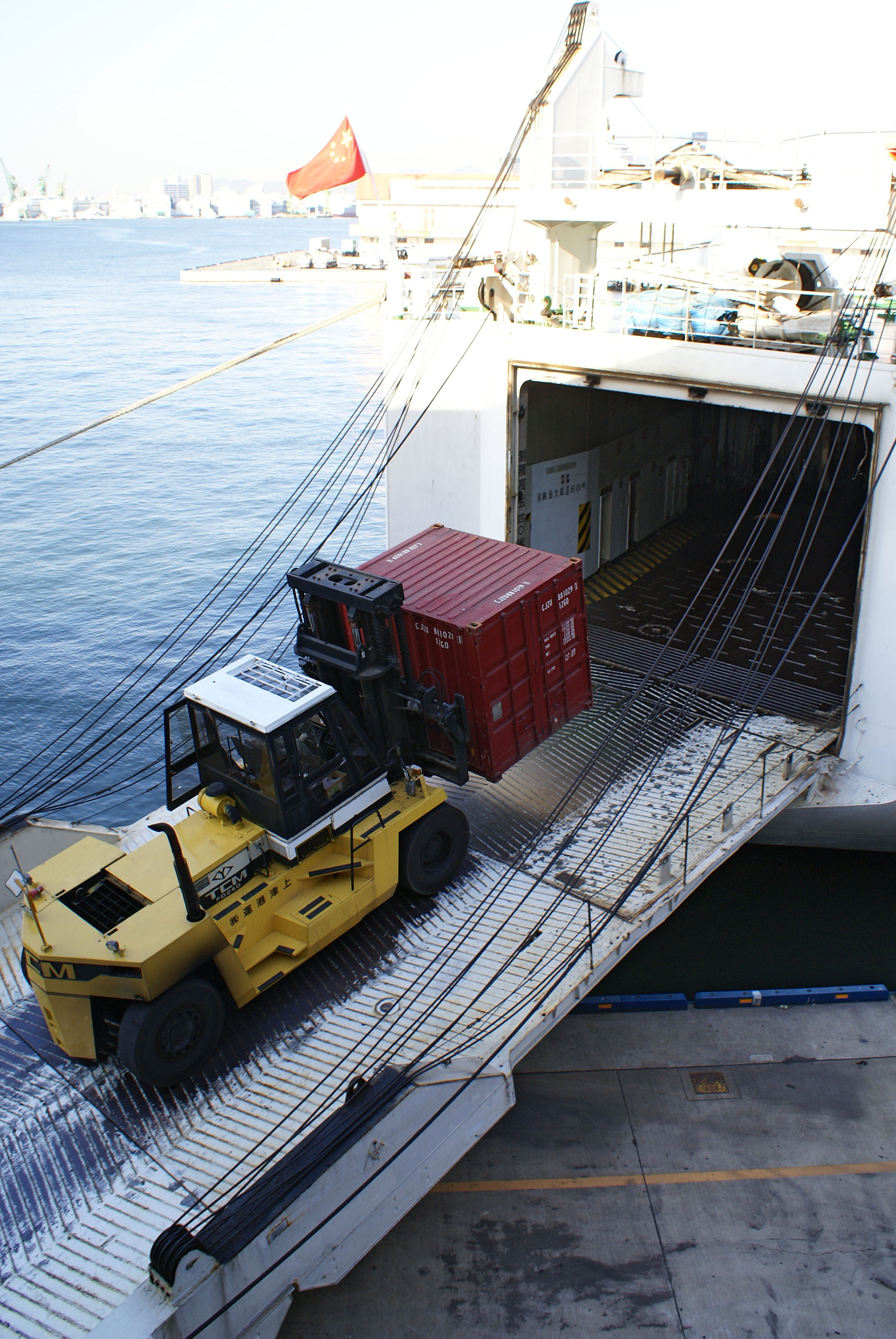
Xinjianzhen, a Chinese ship anchored in Kobe harbor, Japan

During the early 1960s, China's merchant marine had fewer than thirty ships. By the 1970s and 1980s, maritime shipping capabilities had greatly increased. In 1985 China established eleven shipping offices and jointly operated shipping companies in foreign countries. In 1986 China ranked ninth in world shipping with more than 600 ships and a total tonnage of 16 million, including modern roll-on and roll-off ships, container ships, large bulk carriers, refrigerator ships, oil tankers, and multipurpose ships. The fleet called at more than 400 ports in more than 100 countries.

The container ship fleet also was expanding rapidly. In 1984 China had only fifteen container ships. Seven more were added in 1985, and an additional twenty-two were on order. By the early 1980s, Chinese shipyards had begun to manufacture a large number of ships for their own maritime fleet. The China Shipping Inspection Bureau became a member of the Suez Canal Authority in 1984, empowering China to sign and issue seaworthiness certificates for ships on the Suez Canal and confirming the good reputation and maturity of its shipbuilding industry. In 1986 China had 523 shipyards of various sizes, 160 specialized factories, 540,000 employees, and more than 80 scientific research institutes. The main shipbuilding and repairing bases of Shanghai, Dalian, Tianjin, Guangzhou, and Wuhan had 14 berths for 10,000-ton-class ships and 13 docks.

The inadequacy of port and harbor facilities was a longstanding problem for China but has become a more serious obstacle because of increased foreign trade. Beginning in the 1970s, the authorities gave priority to port construction. From 1972 to 1982, port traffic increased sixfold, largely because of the foreign trade boom. The imbalance between supply and demand continued to grow. Poor management and limited port facilities created such backups that by 1985 an average of 400 to 500 ships were waiting to enter major Chinese ports on any given day. The July 1985 delay of more than 500 ships, for instance, caused huge losses. All of China's major ports are undergoing some construction. To speed economic development, the Seventh Five-Year Plan called for the construction by 1990 of 200 new berths — 120 deep-water berths for ships above 10,000 tons and 80 medium-sized berths for ships below 10,000 tons — bringing the total number of berths to 1,200. Major port facilities were developed all along China's coast.

== Civil aviation ==
In 1987 China's civil aviation system was operated by the General Administration of Civil Aviation of China (CAAC). By 1987 China had more than 229,000 kilometers of domestic air routes and more than 94,000 kilometers of international air routes. The more than 9 million passengers and 102,000 tons of freight traffic represented a 40 percent growth over the previous year. The air fleet consisted of about 175 aircraft and smaller turboprop transports. CAAC had 274 air routes, including 33 international flights to 28 cities in 23 countries, such as Tokyo, Osaka, Nagasaki, New York City, San Francisco, Los Angeles, London, Paris, Frankfurt, East Berlin, Zurich, Moscow, Istanbul, Manila, Bangkok, Singapore, Sydney, and Hong Kong. Almost 200 domestic air routes connected such major cities as Beijing, Shanghai, Tianjin, Guangzhou, Hangzhou, Kunming, Chengdu and Xi'an, as well as a number of smaller cities. The government had bilateral air service agreements with more than 40 countries and working relations with approximately 386 foreign airline companies. CAAC also provided air service for agriculture, forestry, communications, and scientific research.

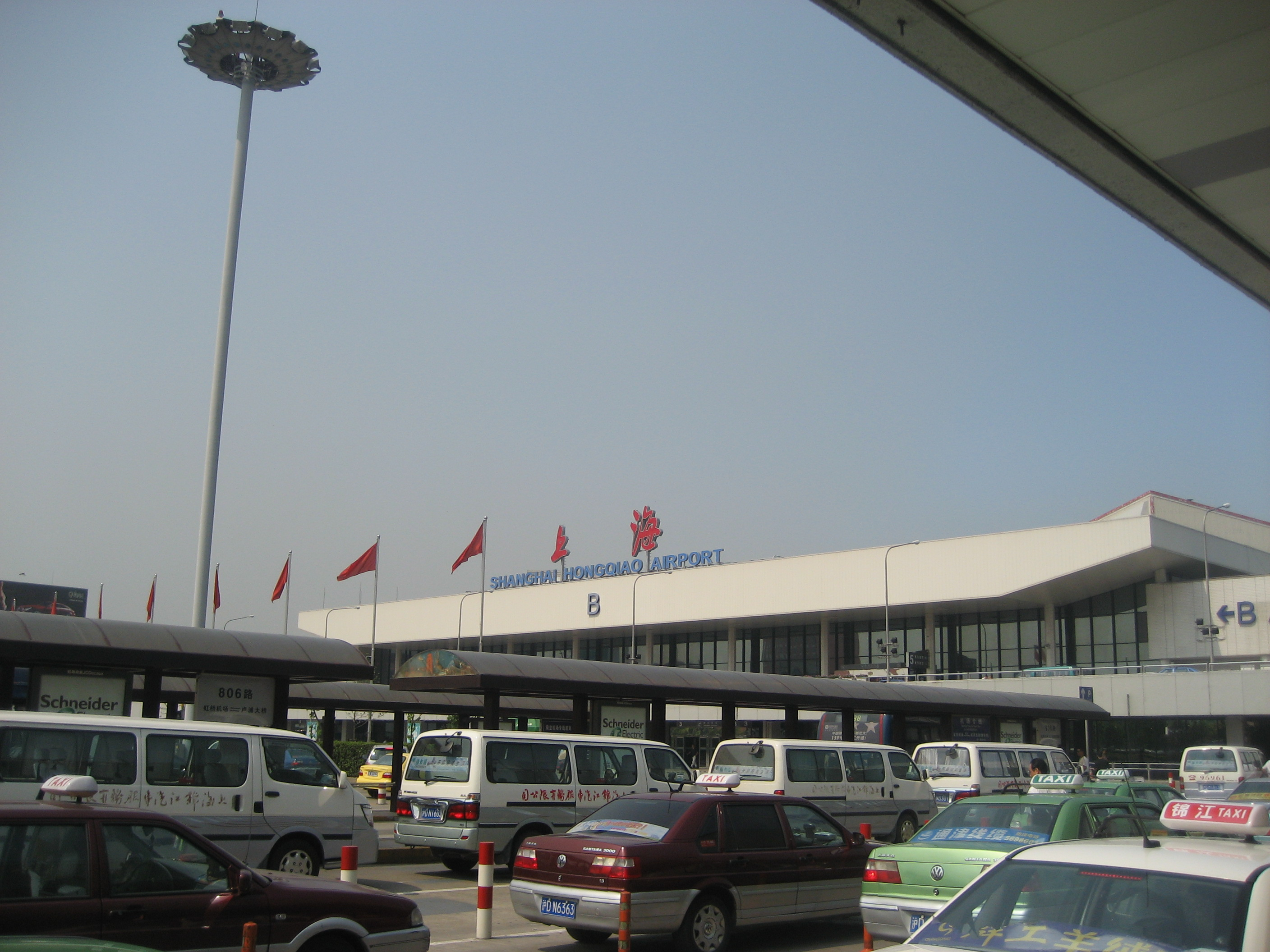
Shanghai Hongqiao International Airport

The staff of CAAC was estimated at 50,000 in the 1980s. The administration operated three training colleges to educate future airline personnel. In a bid to improve CAAC's services, more ticket offices were opened in major cities for domestic and international flights.

In the mid-1980s regional airlines began operations under the general aegis of CAAC. Wuhan Airlines, run by the Wuhan municipal authorities, started scheduled passenger flights to Hubei, Hunan, Guangdong, and Sichuan provinces in May 1986. Xizang also planned to set up its own airline to fly to Kathmandu and Hong Kong.

In the 1980s the central government increased its investment in airport construction, and some local governments also granted special funds for such projects. Lhasa Airport in Tibet, Jiamusi Airport in Heilongjiang, and Kashgar airport and Yining airports in Xinjiang were expanded, and new airports were under construction in Xi'an, Luoyang and Shenzhen. An investment of ¥500 million was planned for expanding runways and building new terminals and other airport facilities. In 1986 China had more than ninety civilian airports, of which eight could accommodate Boeing 747s and thirty-two could accommodate Boeing 737s and Tridents.

== See also ==
- Ministry of Transport of the People's Republic of China
