= Keqiao, Shaoxing =

Keqiao 柯桥区
- District
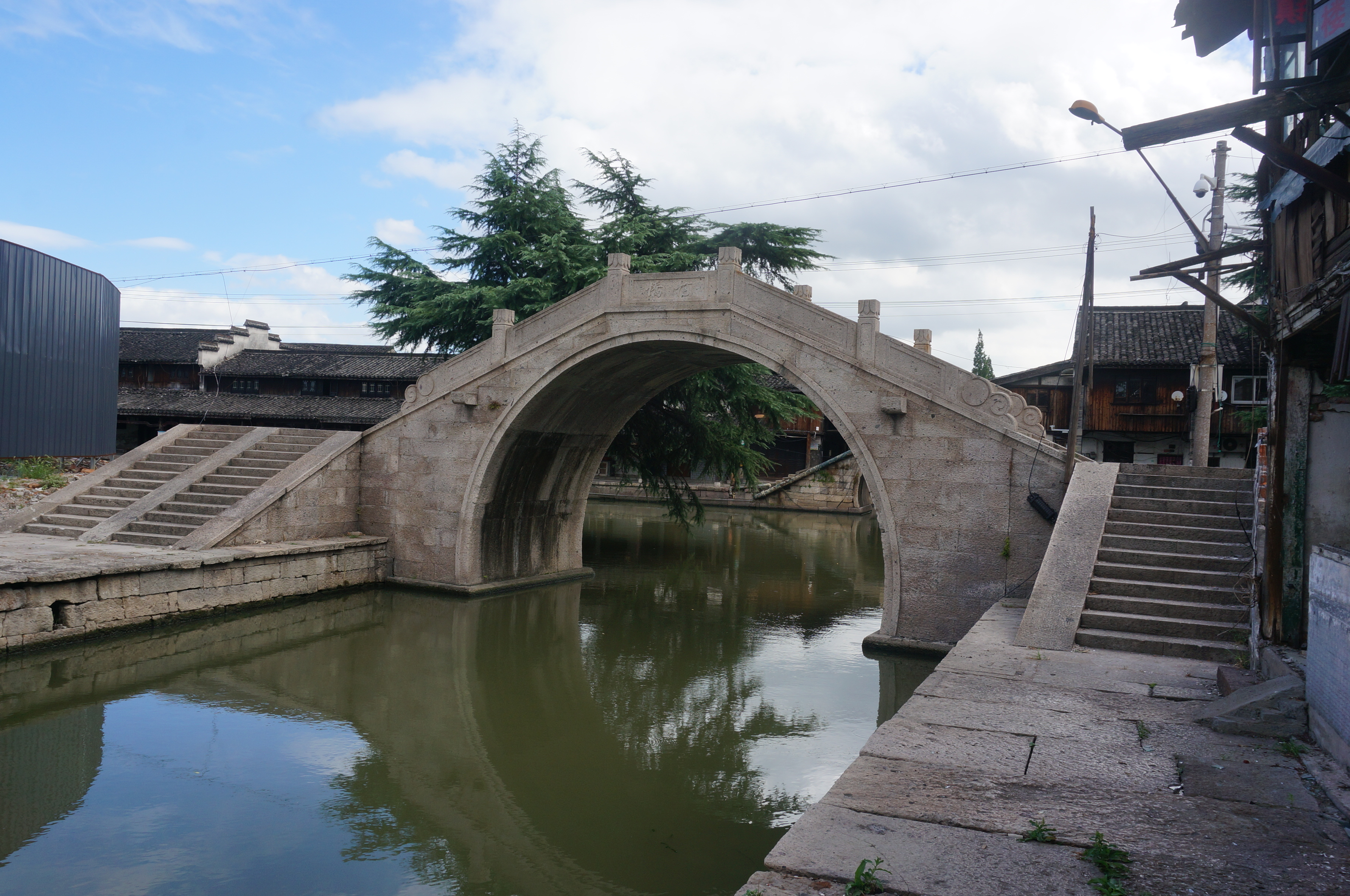
- Ke Bridge (柯桥)

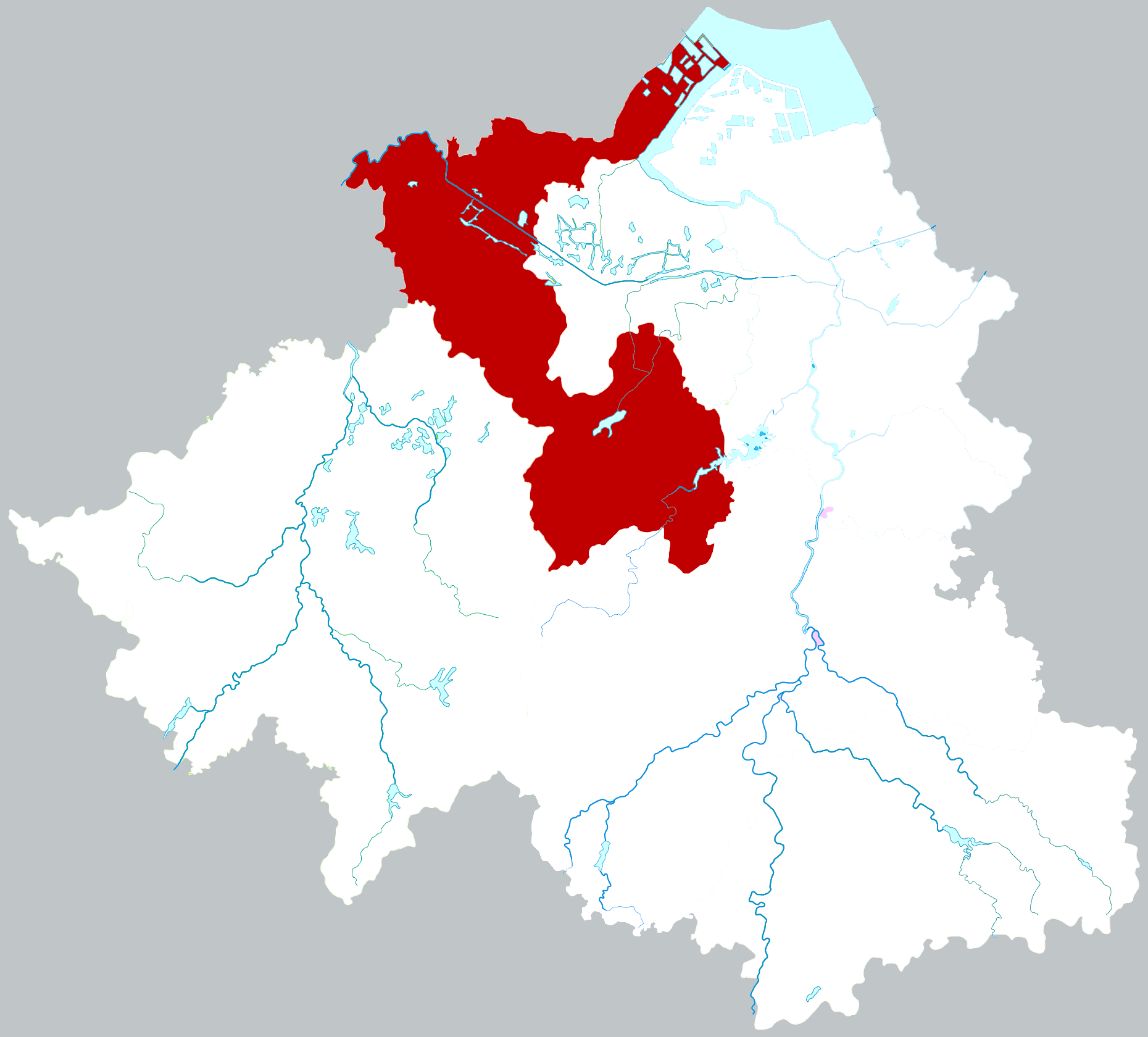
- Location in Shaoyang

- Location in Zhejiang
- Coordinates: 30°04′55″N 120°29′41″E
- Country: People's Republic of China
- Province: Zhejiang
- Prefecture-level city: Shaoxing

Area
  - District: 1,040 km^{2} (400 sq mi)
  - Urban: 77 km^{2} (30 sq mi)
- Time zone: UTC+8 (China Standard)
- Website: www.kq.gov.cn/col/col1529800/index.html

Keqiao District (simplified Chinese: 柯桥区; traditional Chinese: 柯橋區; pinyin: Kēqiáo Qū), formerly Shaoxing County, is a district of the city of Shaoxing in Zhejiang province, China.

The Keqiao section of the Eastern Zhejiang Canal is one of the best preserved, having historic bridges of the ancient towpath.

== Geography ==
Keqiao District, located in the south of Yangtze Delta, meets Shanghai in north, Hangzhou in west and Ningbo in east. It is 20 km (12 mi) from Xiaoshan International Airport, 230 km (140 mi) to Pudong International Airport and 150 km (93 mi) to Ningbo port. It has an area of 1,040 km^{2} (400 sq mi).

== Climate ==
Climate data for Keqiao (1981−2010)
Month	Jan	Feb	Mar	Apr	May	Jun	Jul	Aug	Sep	Oct	Nov	Dec	Year
Mean daily maximum °C (°F)	8.3 (46.9)	10.4 (50.7)	14.8 (58.6)	21.1 (70.0)	26.3 (79.3)	28.9 (84.0)	33.6 (92.5)	32.4 (90.3)	27.7 (81.9)	22.9 (73.2)	17.4 (63.3)	11.2 (52.2)	21.3 (70.2)
Mean daily minimum °C (°F)	1.7 (35.1)	3.4 (38.1)	6.9 (44.4)	12.4 (54.3)	17.7 (63.9)	21.6 (70.9)	25.5 (77.9)	25.1 (77.2)	20.9 (69.6)	15.1 (59.2)	9.1 (48.4)	3.3 (37.9)	13.6 (56.4)
Average precipitation mm (inches)	85.9 (3.38)	86.6 (3.41)	144.0 (5.67)	125.0 (4.92)	136.6 (5.38)	199.6 (7.86)	146.6 (5.77)	176.0 (6.93)	150.7 (5.93)	79.5 (3.13)	80.7 (3.18)	58.7 (2.31)	1,469.9 (57.87)
Source: National Meteorological Center of CMA

== Administrative divisions ==
Subdistricts:

- Keqiao Subdistrict (柯桥街道), Keyan Subdistrict (柯岩街道), Huashe Subdistrict (华舍街道), Hutang Subdistrict (湖塘街道), Qixian Subdistrict (齐贤街道), Fuquan Subdistrict (福全镇), Anchang Subdistrict (安昌街道), Lanting Subdistrict (兰亭街道), Qianqing Subdistrict (钱清街道), Yangxunqiao Subdistrict (杨汛桥街道), Ma'an Subdistrict (马鞍街道)

Towns:

- Pingshui (平水镇), Wangtan (王坛镇), Jidong (稽东镇), Lizhu (漓渚镇), Xialü (夏履镇),

== Demographics ==
Keqiao District contains 302 administrative villages, 70 neighborhood committees (community), and has a registered population of 714,600 and a non-registered population of 606,800.

It is home to around 5,000 Indian textile traders.

== Economy ==
Keqiao District has experienced rapid economic and social development, and repeatedly entered the top ten counties. In 2008, the county's GDP reached 60.8 billion yuan with a growth rate of 8.8% from 2007, per capita GDP reached RMB 85,368 yuan (US$12,075); financial revenues reached 7.57 billion yuan, of which the local financial revenue 3.85 billion yuan, respectively, an annual increase of 13.0% and 17.5%, total fixed asset investment of 24.2 billion yuan, an annual increase of 12.9%, of which 14.1 billion yuan of industrial inputs, an annual growth of 0.2%; urban residents per capita disposable income reached 26,155 yuan, the per capita net income of farmers 13,372 yuan, respectively, the average annual growth of 12.5% and 12.6%.

The textile industry contributes a significant part to the local economy. Keqiao is one of the largest textile dyeing and printing bases in China. It is also home to the China Textile City, a 3.65 million square metre marketplace with 29,000 sellers.

== Transport ==
Keqiao District is served by Shaoxing Metro Line 1, which offers an interchange with Hangzhou Metro Line 5 at Guniangqiao station.

== Tourist attractions ==
The district houses many ancient bridges, such as Taiping Bridge and Jiedu Bridge.
