= Dashan (disambiguation) =

Dashan is a Canadian comedian and television personality popular in China.

Dashan may also refer to:

- Dashan Island, an island of Shandong Province, China
- Dashan Pagoda, a pagoda in Shaoxing, Zhejiang Province, China
- Dashan railway station, a railway station on the Taiwan Railways Administration West Coast line
- Dashan Village (大山里), Houlong, Miaoli County, Taiwan
- Dashan Village (大山村), Puyi Township, Guangxi, China
- Ras Dashan, the highest mountain in Ethiopia
- Jamil Dashan Wilson (born 1990), an American professional basketball player
- Daxiushan, also referred as dashan (Chinese: 大衫), a form of shan

== See also ==
- Daisen (disambiguation), Japanese on'yomi reading of 大山
- Ōyama (disambiguation), Japanese kun'yomi reading of 大山
