= Big Mountain =

Big Mountain may refer to:

== Places ==
=== United States ===
- Big Mountain Air Force Station, Lake and Peninsula Borough, Alaska
  - Big Mountain, Alaska, the location of the Air Force station
- Big Mountain, Arizona, another name for Black Mesa, Arizona
- Big Mountain (Broadwater County, Montana), a mountain in Broadwater County, Montana
- Big Mountain (Flathead County, Montana), a mountain in Flathead County, Montana
- Big Mountain (Jefferson County, Montana), a mountain in Jefferson County, Montana
- Big Mountain (Madison County, Montana), a mountain in Madison County, Montana
- The Big Mountain, a ski resort in Montana
- Big Mountain (Oklahoma), a mountain ridge in Pushmataha County, Oklahoma
- Big Mountain (Pennsylvania), a mountain ridge in Pennsylvania
- Big Mountain Pass, a mountain pass in Utah

=== Falkland Islands ===
- Big Mountain (Falkland Islands), a mountain in East Falkland Island.

== Entertainment ==
- Big Mountain (band), an American reggae band
- Big Mountain 2000, a video game
- Big Mountain Short Film Festival, held in Ohakune, New Zealand
- Big Mountain, the main location of the Old World Blues add-on for the action role-playing game Fallout: New Vegas

== Other ==
- Big mountain skiing, a type of freestyle skiing
- Big mountain palm, Hedyscepe canterburyana

== See also ==
- 大山
