= 大山 =

大山, literally meaning "Big Mountain", may refer to:

- Dashan (disambiguation), the Chinese transliteration
- two Japanese transliterations
  - Daisen (disambiguation)
  - Ōyama (disambiguation)
