= BMX (disambiguation) =

BMX is a sport of racing on bicycles on motocross style tracks.

BMX can also refer to:

- BMX bike, a bicycle used for casual use and sport, and designed mainly for dirt and motocross cycling
- Big Mountain Air Force Station (IATA: BMX), a military use airstrip located near Big Mountain, Alaska
- Cytoplasmic tyrosine-protein kinase BMX, an enzyme that in humans is encoded by the BMX gene
- BMX (quadraphonic sound), a quadrophonic sound system
