= Oyama =

Oyama, Ōyama or Ohyama may refer to:

- Oyama, Tochigi (Japanese: 小山市), a city in Japan
- Ōyama, Ōita (Japanese: 大山町), a town in Japan
- Oyama, Shizuoka (Japanese: 小山町), a town in Japan
- Ōyama, Toyama, (Japanese: 大山町), a former town in Japan
- Mount Ōyama (Kanagawa) (Japanese: 大山), a mountain in Japan
- Oyama, British Columbia, a town in Lake Country, British Columbia, Canada
- Oyama (Japanese theatre), male actors who play female roles in kabuki theatre, also known as onnagata
- Oyama (crater), in Mars
- 14922 Ohyama, an inner main-belt asteroid
- Oyama Station, a station in Oyama, Tochigi
- Ōyama Station (disambiguation), stations with that name

== People with the surname ==
- Aemu Oyama (大山 愛笑; born 2004), Japanese footballer
- Anza Ohyama (born 1976), Japanese singer and actress
- Arthur Henrique Ricciardi Oyama, or simply Arthur Henrique (born 1987), Brazilian footballer
- Erica Oyama (born 1981), American television writer
- Harue Oyama McVay (born 1928), American ceramist
- Heiichiro Ohyama (大山 平一郎; born 1947), Japanese conductor and violinist
- Ōyama Iwao (Japanese: 大山 巌), Japanese field marshal
- Ikuo Oyama (大山 郁夫; 1880–1955), Japanese academic and politician
- Judi Oyama, American skateboarder
- Kana Oyama (born 1984) (Japanese: 大山 加奈), Japanese volleyball player
- Katsura Ōyama (大山 桂; 1917–1995), Japanese paleontologist and zoologist
- Keiji Oyama (小山 桂; born 1980), Japanese former baseball player
- Keisuke Oyama (大山 啓輔; born 1995), Japanese footballer
- Kyosuke Oyama (小山 恭輔; born 1987), Japanese swimmer
- Luís Oyama (born 1997), Brazilian footballer
- Mana Ohyama (大山 真奈; born 1992), Japanese handball player
- Mary Oyama Mittwer (1907–1994), American journalist
- Mas Oyama (Japanese: 大山 倍達), Zainichi Korean karate master
- Motoi Oyama (尾山 基; born 1951), Japanese businessman
- Mikio Oyama (大山 三喜雄; born 1955), Japanese speed skater
- Musashi Oyama (大山 武蔵; born 1998), Japanese footballer
- Nina Oyama (born 1993), Australian comedian
- Nobuyo Ōyama (大山 のぶ代; born 1933), Japanese actress
- Reiji Oyama (尾山 令仁; 1927–2023), Japanese pastor
- Ruan Ohyama (大山 琉杏; born 2003), Japanese singer known professionally as Ruann
- Shigeru Oyama (大山 茂; 1936–2016), Japanese karateka
- Shigetaka Oyama (大山 重隆; born 1981), Japanese sports shooter
- Shiho Oyama (大山 志保, Ōyama Shiho; born 25 May 1977), Japanese golfer
- Shuka Oyama (小山 修加; born 1980), Japanese volleyball player
- Shungo Oyama (Japanese: 大山 峻護), Japanese mixed martial artist
- Shunsuke Oyama (大山 俊輔; born 1986), Japanese former footballer
- Susan Oyama (born 1943), American psychologist and philosopher
- Oyama Susumu (born 1952), Japanese sumo wrestler
- Ōyama Sutematsu (大山 捨松; 1860–1919), first Japanese woman to receive a college degree
- Tadanari Ōyama (大山 忠成, Ōyama Tadanari), Japanese former footballer, more well-known as Tadanari Lee (李 忠成; born 1985)
- Taeko Oyama (大山 妙子; born 1974), Japanese basketball player
- Takanori Ōyama (大山 鎬則; born 1974), Japanese voice actor
- Takao Ōyama (大山 高男; 1944–2019), Japanese voice actor
- Takashi Ohyama (大山 喬史), Japanese dentist
- Takashi Ohyama, Japanese dentist
- Oyama Tomomasa (小山 朝政; 1155–1238), Japanese samurai
- Tsunamasa Ōyama (大山 綱昌; 1853-1934), Japanese politician
- Yasuharu Ōyama (Japanese: 大山 康晴), Japanese shogi player
- Yoshimatsu Oyama (大山 義松), Japanese footballer
- Yūsuke Ōyama (大山 悠輔; born 1994), Japanese baseball player
- Zac Oyama (born 1987), a CollegeHumor cast member

== Fictional characters ==
- Gorou Ohyama (大山 吾郎) and Haruka Ohyama (大山 春夏), characters from the manga series Mix
- Kota Oyama (大山 こうた), a character from the manga series Please Go Home, Miss Akutsu!
- Mahiro Oyama (緒山 真尋/まひろ) and Mihari Oyama (緒山 みはり), characters from the manga series Onimai: I'm Now Your Sister!
- Naojiro Oyama (大山 直次郎), a character from the manga series Shutendoji
- Takeru Ooyama (大山 タケル), a character from the manga series Maken-ki!
- Tochirō Ōyama (大山 トチロー), a character from the Space Pirate Captain Harlock series

== See also ==
- Oyama v. California (1948), a United States Supreme Court case
- Mount Daisen (Japanese: 大山), written with the same characters as "Ōyama", but using on'yomi reading
- Koyama (disambiguation) (Japanese: 小山), written with the same characters as the geographical "Oyama", but using an alternative kun'yomi reading
