= Shaoxing =

Shaoxing 绍兴市 Shaohsing
- Prefecture-level city
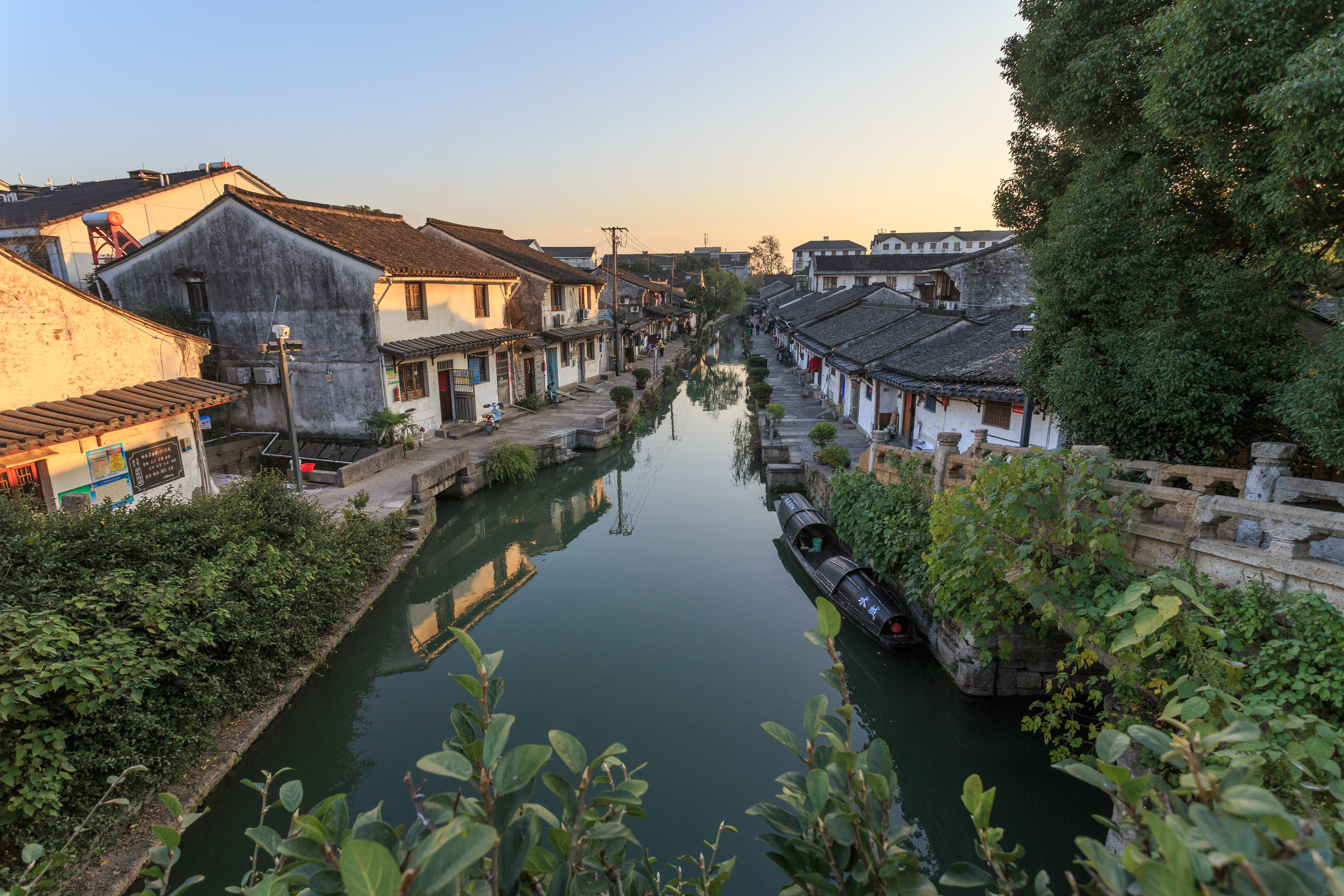
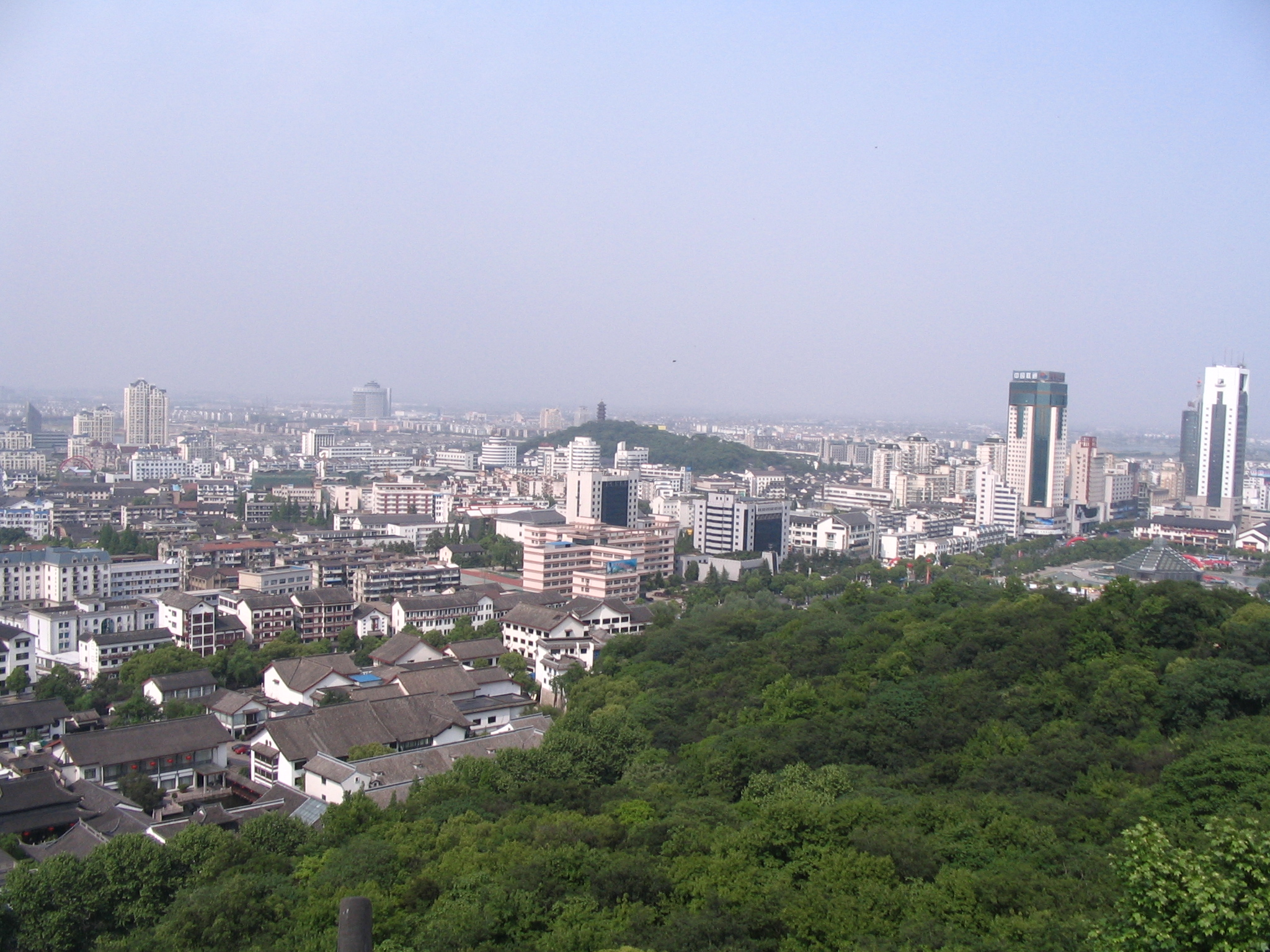
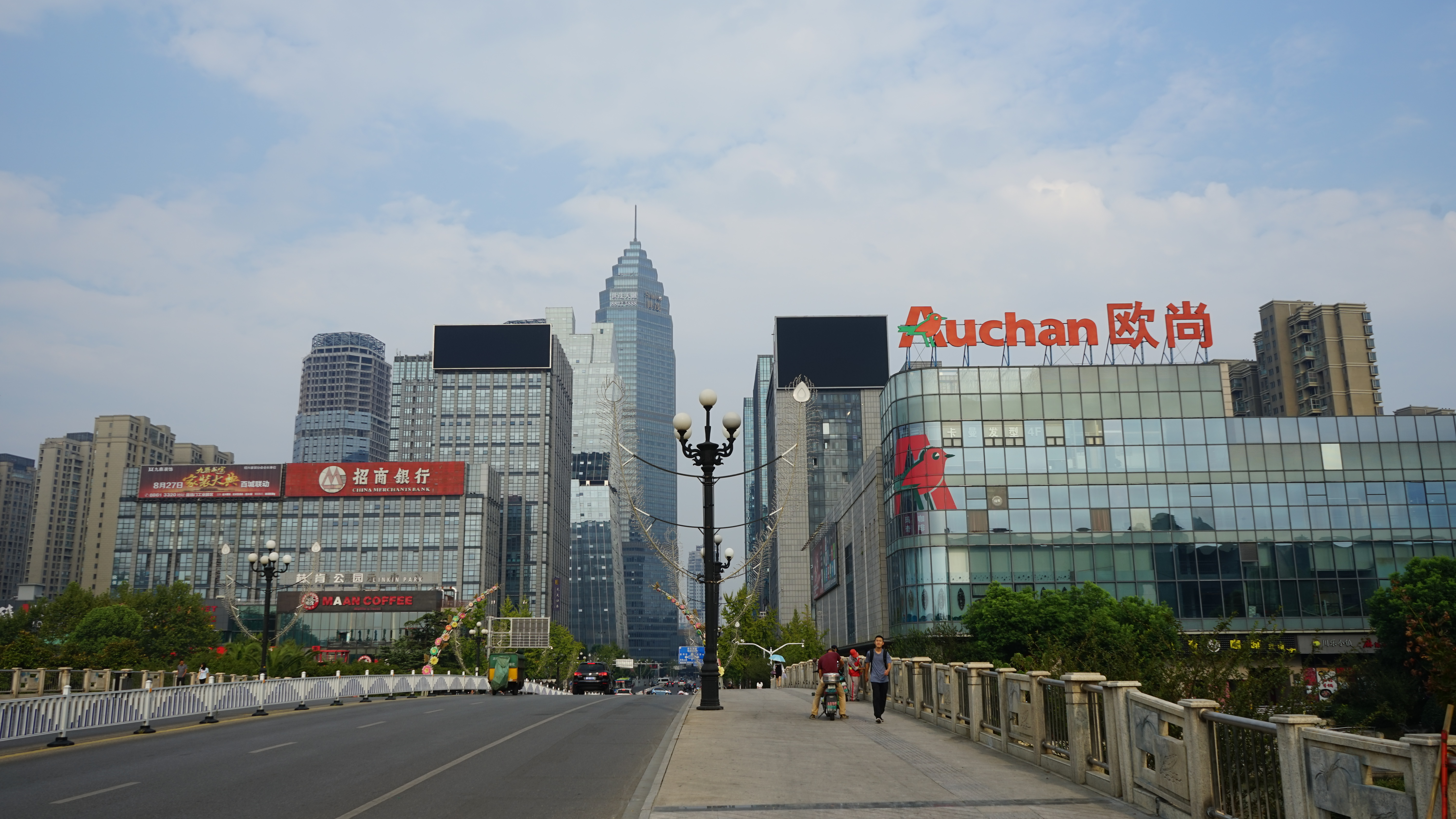
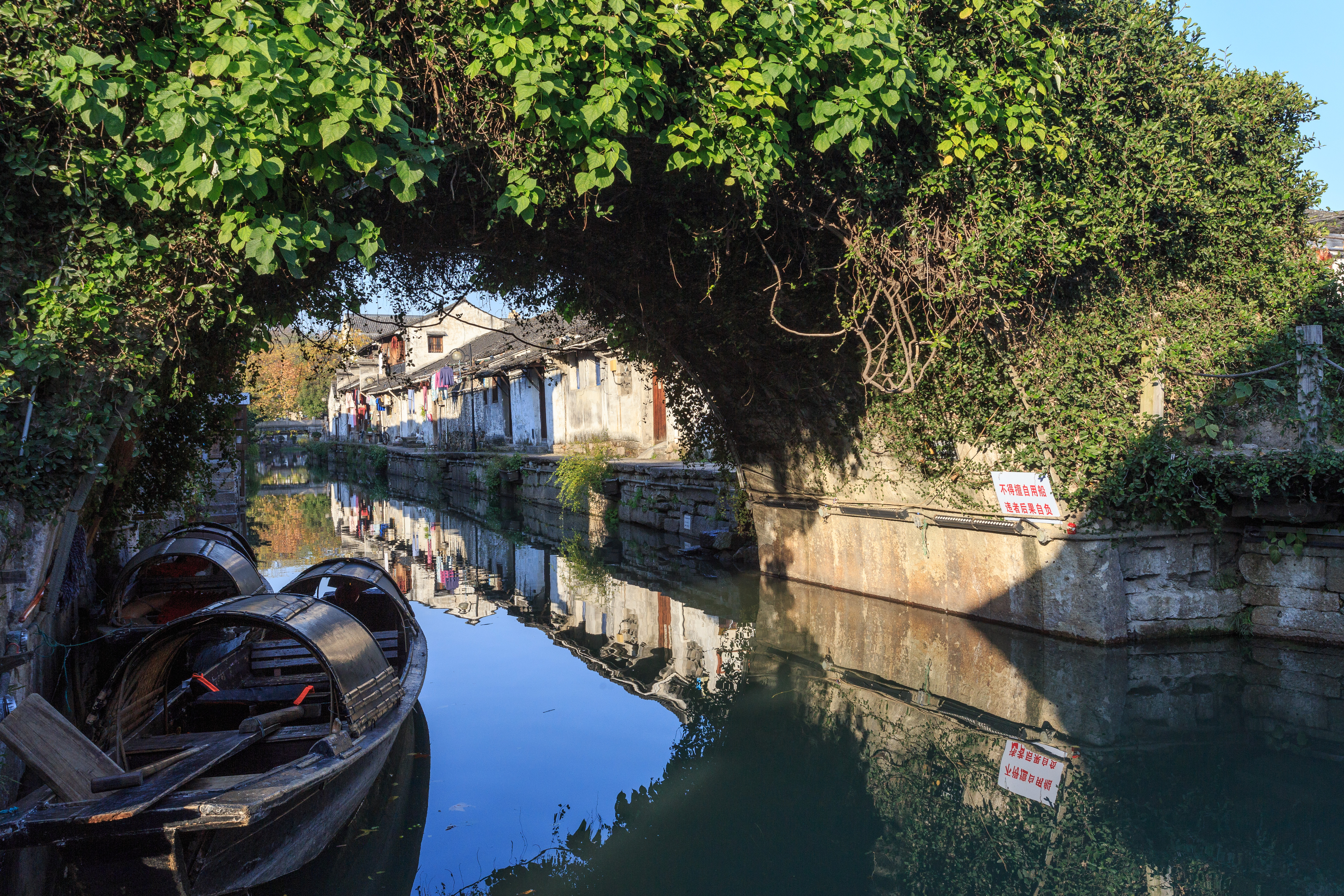
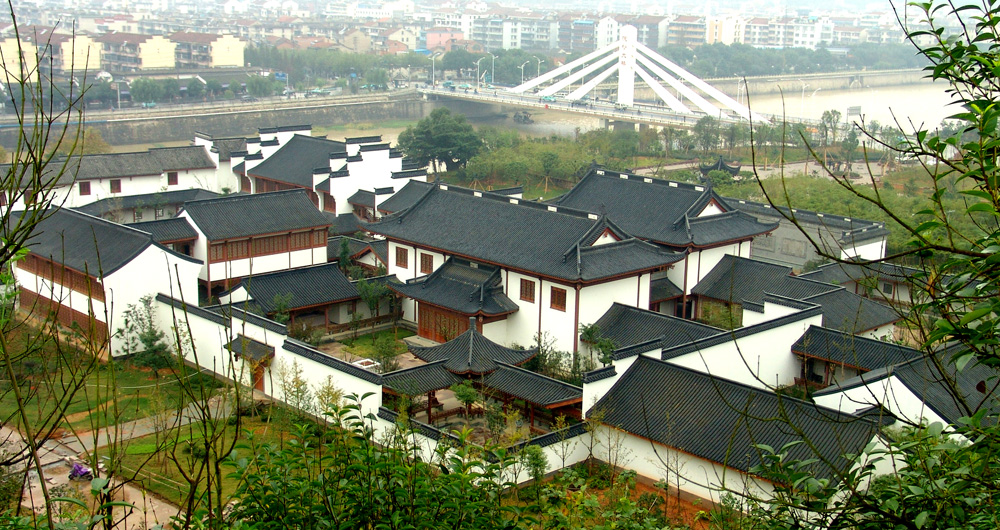
- Left to right, top to bottom: Bazi Bridge over the Eastern Zhejiang Canal, Shaoxing cityscape, Didang subdistrict, Tishan Bridge, traditional houses in Zhuji.

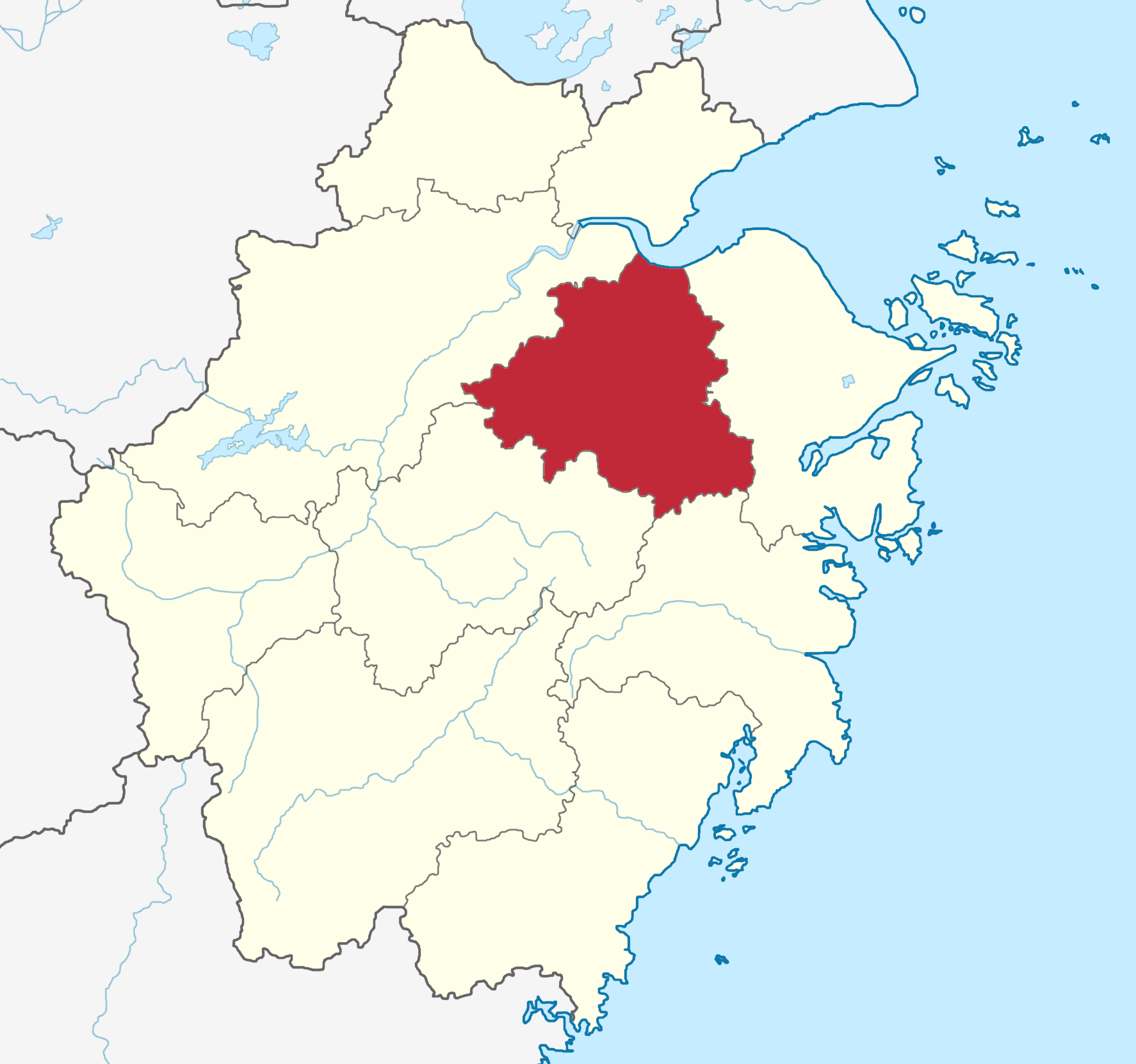

- Location within Zhejiang Location within China
- Country: People's Republic of China
- Province: Zhejiang
- County-level divisions: 6
- Municipal seat: Yuecheng District

Government
  - Mayor: Yu Zhihong (俞志宏)

Area
  - Prefecture-level city: 8,279.1 km^{2} (3,196.6 sq mi)
  - Urban: 2,965.1 km^{2} (1,144.8 sq mi)
  - Metro: 8,107.9 km^{2} (3,130.5 sq mi)

Population (2020 census)
  - Prefecture-level city: 5,270,977
  - Density: 636.66/km^{2} (1,648.9/sq mi)
  - Urban: 2,958,643
  - Urban density: 997.82/km^{2} (2,584.3/sq mi)
  - Metro: 13,035,326
  - Metro density: 1,607.7/km^{2} (4,164.0/sq mi)

GDP (2025)
  - Prefecture-level city: CN¥ 893.2 billion US$ 130.77 billion
  - Per capita: CN¥ 164,314; US$ 23,004
- Time zone: UTC+8 (China Standard)
- Area code: 0575
- ISO 3166 code: CN-ZJ-06
- License Plate Prefix: 浙D
- Website: www.sx.gov.cn

Shaoxing
- "Shaoxing" in Simplified (top) and Traditional (bottom) Chinese characters
- Simplified Chinese: 绍兴
- Traditional Chinese: 紹興
- Postal: Shaohing
- Literal meaning: (An era of the Song dynasty)
Transcriptions
Standard Mandarin
- Hanyu Pinyin: Shàoxīng
- Gwoyeu Romatzyh: Shawshing
- Wade–Giles: Shao^{4}-hsing^{1}
- IPA: [ʂâʊɕíŋ]
Wu
- Romanization: Soh-shing
Yue: Cantonese
- Yale Romanization: Siuh-hīng
- Jyutping: Siu^{6}-hing^{1}
- IPA: [siw˨hɪŋ˥]
Southern Min
- Tâi-lô: Siāu-heng
Middle Chinese
- Middle Chinese: d͡ʒjèw xing

Kuaiji
- Simplified Chinese: 会稽
- Traditional Chinese: 會稽
- Postal: Kwaiki
Transcriptions
Standard Mandarin
- Hanyu Pinyin: Kuàijī
- Gwoyeu Romatzyh: Kuayji
- Wade–Giles: Kʻuai^{4}-chi^{1}
- IPA: [kʰwâɪtɕí]
Wu
- Romanization: Kwae-ji
Yue: Cantonese
- Yale Romanization: Kui-kāi
- Jyutping: Kui^{3}-kai^{1}
Southern Min
- Tâi-lô: Kuè-ke

Shanyin
- Simplified Chinese: 山阴
- Traditional Chinese: 山陰
- Postal: Shanyin
Transcriptions
Standard Mandarin
- Hanyu Pinyin: Shānyīn
- Gwoyeu Romatzyh: shan'in
- Wade–Giles: Shan^{1}-yin^{1}
Wu
- Romanization: Sae-yin
Yue: Cantonese
- Jyutping: saan^{1}jam^{1}

Shaoxing (Note: Chinese: 绍兴; [ʂâʊɕíŋ]) is a prefecture-level city on the southern shore of Hangzhou Bay in northeastern Zhejiang province, China. Located on the south bank of the Qiantang River estuary, it borders Ningbo to the east, Taizhou to the southeast, Jinhua to the southwest, and Hangzhou to the west. As of the 2020 census, its population was 5,270,977 inhabitants, among which 2,958,643 (Keqiao, Yuecheng and Shangyu urban districts) lived in the built-up (or metro) area of Hangzhou–Shaoxing, with a total of 13,035,326 inhabitants.

Notable residents of Shaoxing include Wang Xizhi, the parents of Zhou Enlai, Lu Xun, and Cai Yuanpei. It is also noted for Shaoxing wine, meigan cai, and stinky tofu, and was featured on A Bite of China. Its local variety of Chinese opera sung in the local dialect and known as Yue opera is second in popularity only to Peking opera. In 2010, Shaoxing celebrated the 2,500th anniversary of the founding of the city.

Economically, the city is driven by manufacturing of textiles, electronics, and energy-efficient lighting. Zhejiang has the fifth highest per capita GDP in the nation among all the provinces and provincial-level municipalities. The city itself ranks at 18th nationally by GDP per capita among all Chinese cities. According to Southern Weekly's Cities Comfort Index, Shaoxing ranked China’s most comfortable city for four consecutive years, due to its rare combination of high incomes, relatively affordable housing, and short commutes.

== Etymology ==
The city was first named Shaoxing in 1131 A.D. during the Southern Song dynasty. The name comes from the Shaoxing reign period of Emperor Gaozong of Song, and is a poetic term meaning "inheriting the imperial task and resurging to prosperity".

== History ==
=== Early history ===
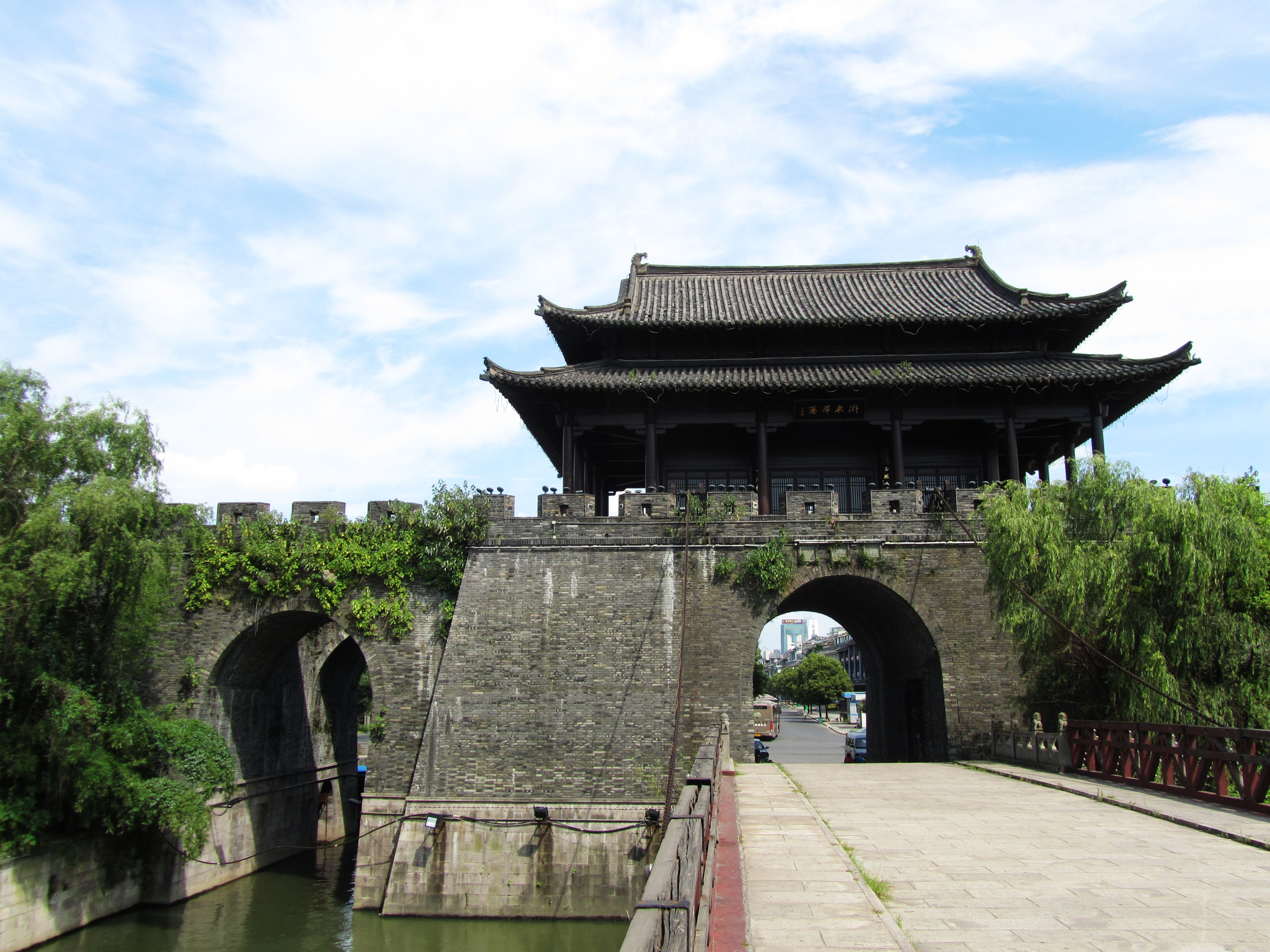
A city gate of Shaoxing built in 1223 during the Song dynasty

Modern-day Shaoxing lies north of the Kuaiji Mountains, which were an important center of the people of Yue during ancient China's Spring and Autumn period. Chinese legend connected them with events in the life of Yu the Great, the founder of the Xia. Around the early 5th century BC, the time of Yue's famous king Goujian, his people began establishing permanent centers in the alluvial plain north of the hills. Following his freedom from captivity in Wu, Goujian commissioned his advisor Fan Li to erect a major triangular fortification in the area of present-day Shaoxing's Yuecheng District. Following Yue's conquest of Wu, though, its royal court was removed to its former rival's capital (present-day Suzhou) until its own conquest by Chu in 334 BC.

Following the area's conquest in 222 BC, the Qin Empire's Kuaiji Commandery was also established in Wu (which then took the name "Kuaiji" from this role) but the First Emperor visited the town in the last year of his reign (210 BC), ascending Mount Kuaiji (present-day Mount Xianglu) and sacrificing to the spirit of Yu. The commemorative stele he erected is now lost but was visited by Sima Qian during his 1st-century BC pilgrimage of China's historical sites and was preserved in his Records of the Grand Historian. By the time of the Later Han, the lands between the Yangtze and Hangzhou Bay received their own commanderies and administration of Kuaiji—then stretching along the south shore of the bay from Qiantang (present-day Hangzhou) to the East China Sea. The area's capital in present-day Yuecheng was then known as Kuaiji until the 12th century, when it was renamed Shaoxing during the Song dynasty. The present site of Yu's mausoleum dates to the 6th-century Southern dynasties period.

=== Ming and Qing dynasties ===
Under the Ming and Qing dynasties, the area was organized as a prefecture containing the following eight counties: urban Kuaiji and Shanyin and rural Yuyao, Zhuji, Xiaoshan, Shangyu, Xinchang, and Cheng (or Sheng). From the later Ming through the Qing, Shaoxing was famous (or notorious) for its network of native sons throughout the Chinese government bureaucracy, cooperating out of native-place loyalty. In addition to the substantial number of Shaoxing natives who succeeded in becoming officials via the regular civil-service examination route, this vertical Shaoxing clique also included county-level jail wardens, plus unofficial legal specialists (muyou) working privately for officials at the county, prefectural, and provincial levels, plus clerks working in Beijing's Six Boards (central administrative offices), especially the Boards of Revenue and Punishment. The legal experts were also known as Shaoxing shiye (Shaoxing masters), and they were indispensable advisers to the local and regional officials who employed them, since their knowledge of the detailed Qing legal code permitted the officials, whose education was in the Confucian Classics, to competently perform one of their major functions, that of judging local civil and criminal cases. Coming from the same gentry social class as the officials, the legal experts were expected to adhere to the ethical dictum enunciated by Wang Huizu, Shaoxing's most famous muyou: "If not in accord [with your employer], then leave" (Bu he ze qu).

During the Taiping Rebellion, Shaoxing was home to a local militia leader named Bao Lisheng who organized an armed resistance to the Taiping army in his home village of Baochun. Bao was a martial arts expert and recruited thousands of people from the surrounding area to his cause by convincing them he had supernatural powers. However, after a months-long siege, Baochun was captured by the Taiping.

=== People's Republic of China ===
Under the Republic of China during the early 20th century, the prefecture was abolished and the name Shaoxing was applied to a new county comprising the former Shanyin and Kuaiji. Currently, Shaoxing is a municipality with a somewhat smaller land area than its Ming-Qing namesake prefecture, having lost Xiaoshan county to Hangzhou on the west and Yuyao county to Ningbo on the east.

== Climate ==
Climate data for Shaoxing, elevation 8 m (26 ft), (1991–2020 normals, extremes 1981–present)
Month	Jan	Feb	Mar	Apr	May	Jun	Jul	Aug	Sep	Oct	Nov	Dec	Year
Record high °C (°F)	24.3 (75.7)	29.1 (84.4)	34.1 (93.4)	35.0 (95.0)	36.7 (98.1)	38.0 (100.4)	41.3 (106.3)	42.5 (108.5)	39.0 (102.2)	34.9 (94.8)	31.5 (88.7)	24.9 (76.8)	42.5 (108.5)
Mean daily maximum °C (°F)	8.7 (47.7)	11.2 (52.2)	15.8 (60.4)	22.1 (71.8)	26.9 (80.4)	29.2 (84.6)	34.0 (93.2)	33.1 (91.6)	28.4 (83.1)	23.4 (74.1)	17.9 (64.2)	11.5 (52.7)	21.9 (71.3)
Daily mean °C (°F)	5.0 (41.0)	7.1 (44.8)	11.2 (52.2)	17.2 (63.0)	22.3 (72.1)	25.3 (77.5)	29.6 (85.3)	29.0 (84.2)	24.5 (76.1)	19.2 (66.6)	13.4 (56.1)	7.3 (45.1)	17.6 (63.7)
Mean daily minimum °C (°F)	2.3 (36.1)	4.0 (39.2)	7.8 (46.0)	13.2 (55.8)	18.5 (65.3)	22.1 (71.8)	26.1 (79.0)	25.8 (78.4)	21.5 (70.7)	15.9 (60.6)	10.1 (50.2)	4.2 (39.6)	14.3 (57.7)
Record low °C (°F)	−6.6 (20.1)	−5.5 (22.1)	−2.0 (28.4)	0.5 (32.9)	8.2 (46.8)	12.1 (53.8)	17.4 (63.3)	19.0 (66.2)	12.5 (54.5)	2.9 (37.2)	−2.4 (27.7)	−10.2 (13.6)	−10.2 (13.6)
Average precipitation mm (inches)	99.3 (3.91)	89.5 (3.52)	137.4 (5.41)	120.3 (4.74)	139.4 (5.49)	231.7 (9.12)	140.5 (5.53)	193.8 (7.63)	132.8 (5.23)	80.7 (3.18)	80.7 (3.18)	72.6 (2.86)	1,518.7 (59.8)
Average snowy days	2.9	2.1	0.6	0.1	0	0	0	0	0	0	0.1	1.3	7.1
Average relative humidity (%)	78	77	75	72	72	80	73	76	80	78	78	76	76
Mean monthly sunshine hours	105.2	106.0	128.9	154.4	168.1	136.9	230.2	214.3	159.2	147.8	120.2	116.7	1,787.9
Percentage possible sunshine	32	34	35	40	40	33	54	53	43	42	38	37	40
Source: China Meteorological Administration all-time extreme temperatureall-time Jul high temperature

== Administration ==
The prefecture-level city of Shaoxing administers three districts, two county-level cities and one county.

Map
Name	Hanzi	Hanyu Pinyin
Yuecheng District	越城区	Yuèchéng Qū
Keqiao District	柯桥区	Keqiao Qū
Shangyu District	上虞区	Shàngyú Qū
Zhuji City	诸暨市	Zhūjì Shì
Shengzhou City	嵊州市	Shèngzhōu Shì
Xinchang County	新昌县	Xīnchāng Xiàn

== Sights at downtown ==
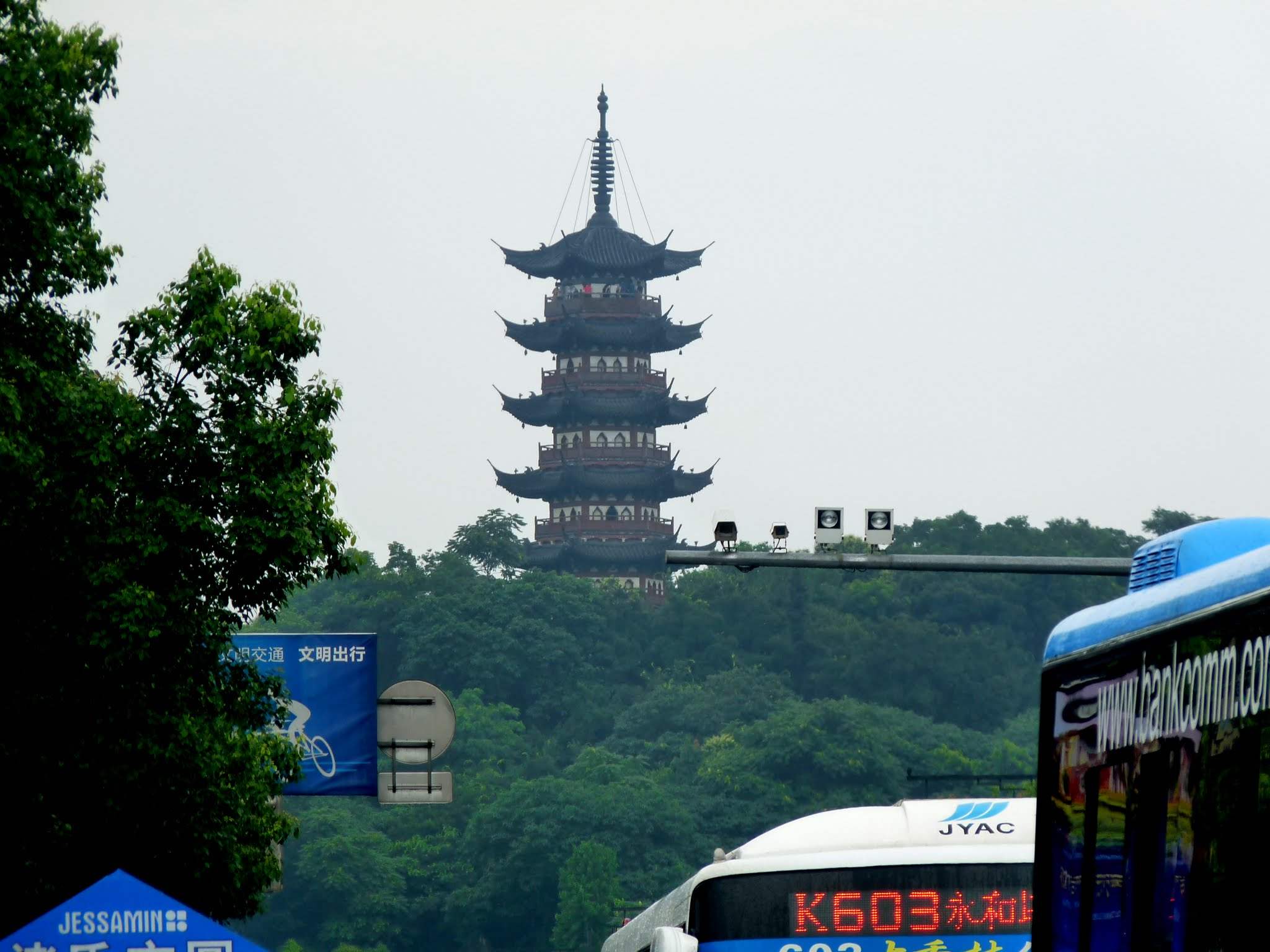

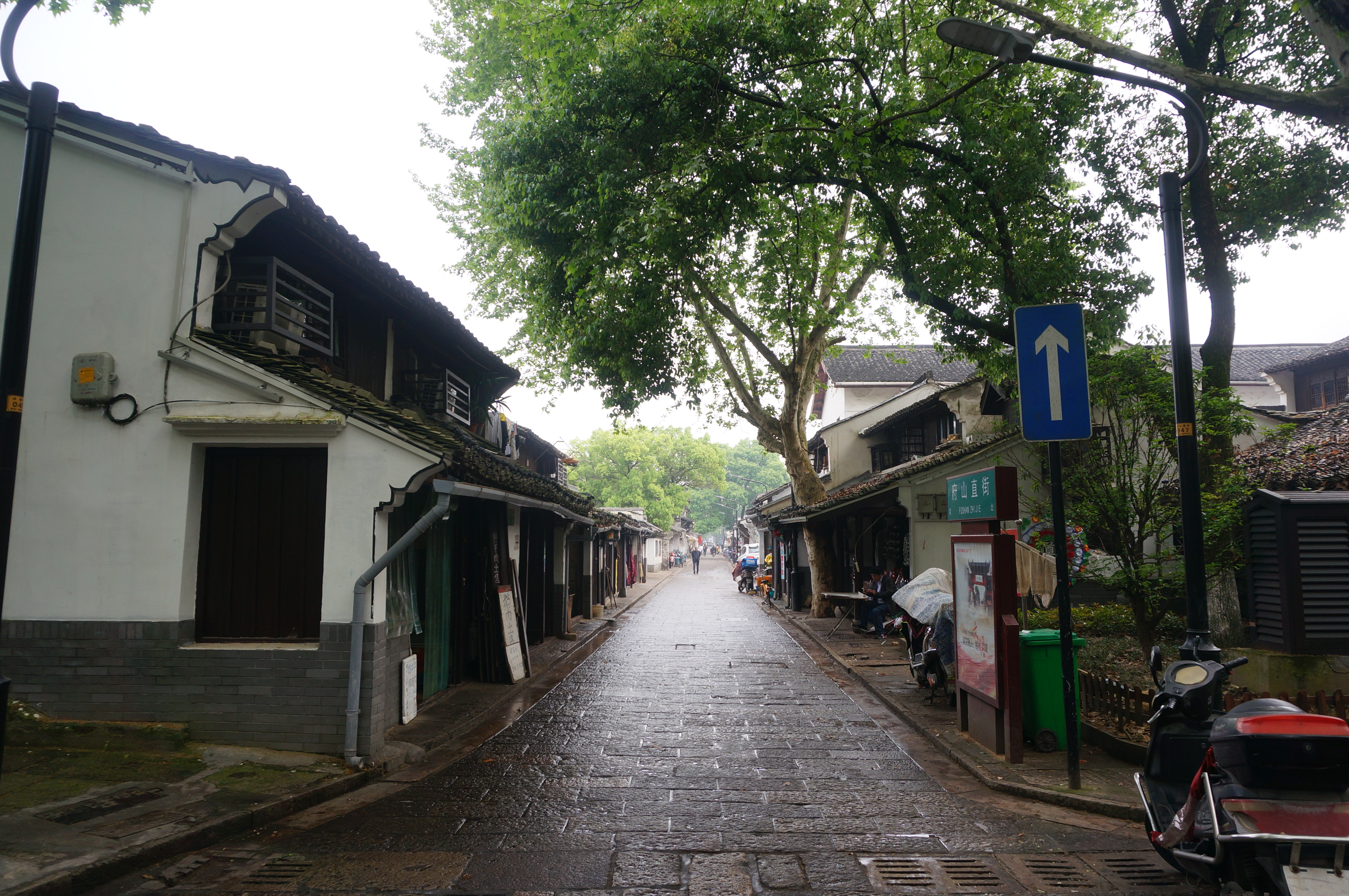
Fushanzhi Street

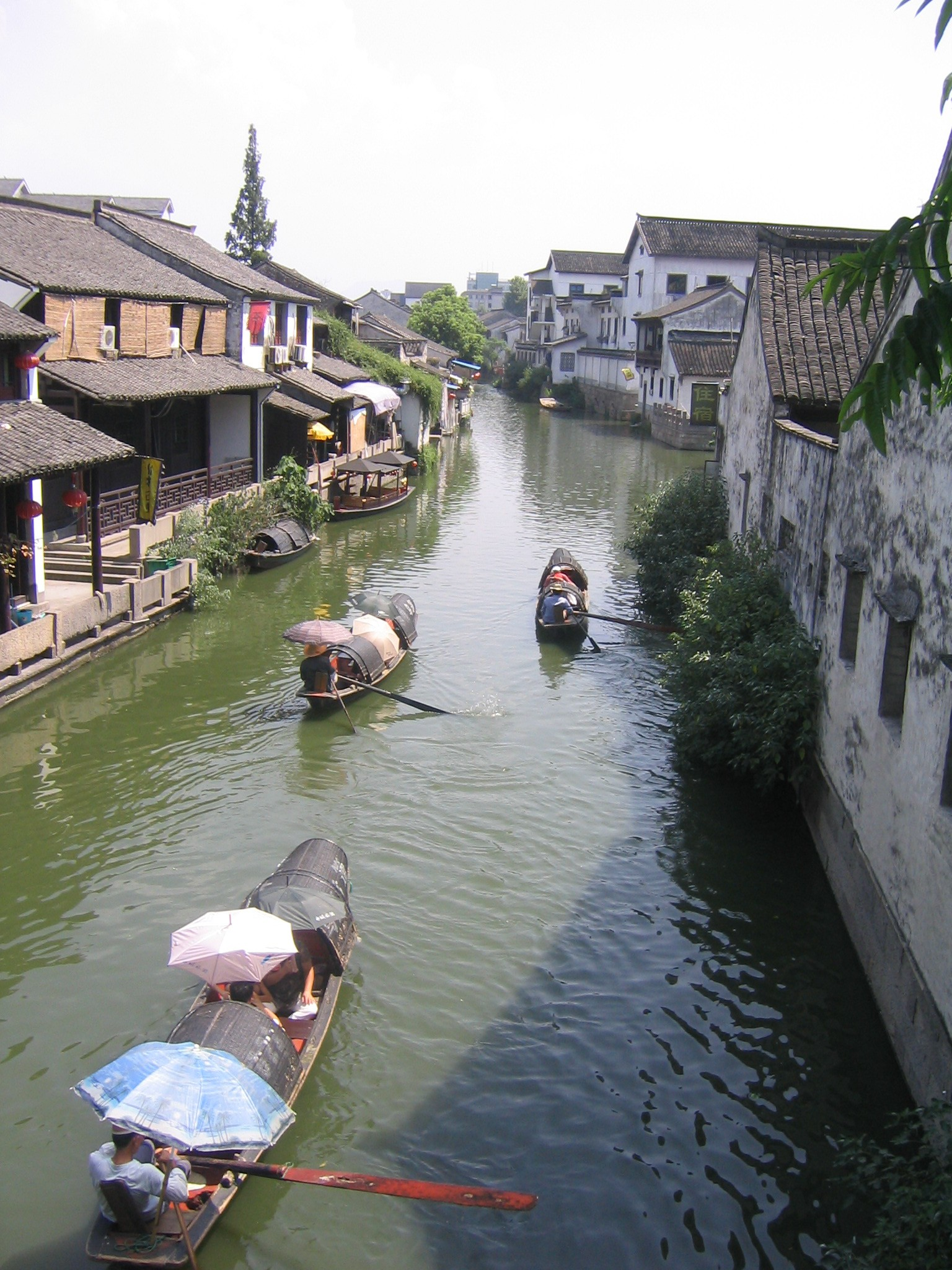

There are a number of historical places connected with the writer Lu Xun:

- Lu Xun Native Place (鲁迅故居) near the centre of the city.
- Xianheng Hotel (咸亨酒店), founded in 1894, mentioned in works by the novelist. In front of the gate is a statue of Kong Yiji, a character in one of his stories.
- Sanwei School (三味书屋), built around 1890, at the end of the Qing dynasty. It was used by the Zhou clan. The writer was born there and grew up in the house, where he studied both western economics and literature as well as Chinese subjects. After he returned to China, he turned it into a primary school, believing that education could inspire national regeneration. He introduced advanced ideas, and technical knowledge to provide opportunities for children in Shaoxing.
- Baicao Garden (百草园)

Historical sites:

- Mount Fu (府山), also called Mount Wolong (卧龙山): Palace of King Yue (越王殿), Stadium of King Yue (越王台), King Yue (越王勾践; c.520–465 BC) lived there for 19 years. Tomb of WenZhong (文種墓), the right minister of King Yue. Spring of Innocence (清白泉) discovered and named by Fan Zhongyan (范仲淹), one of the most famous philosopher and poet during his one-year commissioner in the State of Yue. Old dragon Spruce (龙头古柏) said was planted by Emperor Zhao Gou (赵构) in South Song dynasty.
- Shen Garden (沈园), in Yan'an Road, associated with the poet Lu You and his love for his first wife Tang Wan. The garden dates back to the Southern Song dynasty.
- Green Vine Studio (青藤書屋), former home of the Ming period painter and calligrapher Xu Wei.
- Qiu Jin's House (秋瑾故居), Qing period.
- Zhou Enlai's ancestral home (周恩來祖居), Ming period.

== Suburban sites ==
- Tomb of Yu the Great (大禹陵), legendary founder of the Xia dynasty.
- Orchid Pavilion (兰亭), commemorating one of the most famous calligrapher, general Wang Xizhi and his famous work Lantingji Xu (蘭亭集序), written in Shaoxing in 353 AD.
- East Lake (东湖), scenic area outside the city.
- Tomb of Wang Yangming (1472–1529), general, and Neo–Confucian philosopher. Located on S308, South of Lanting.
- Keyan Scenic Area, a natural scenery scenic park located in the Keqiao section of Shaoxing City.

== Special events ==
Shaoxing was the location of the official World Choir Games in 2010. It also hosted the world Korfball championship in late October 2011.

== Shaoxing wine ==
- Chinese rice wine is also known as Shaoxing wine or simply Shao Wine (绍酒). The brewery utilizes a natural process using the "pure" water of the Jianhu-Mirror Lake. It has a unique flavour and a reputation both nationally and internationally. It is used as a liquor and in cooking as well as a solvent for Chinese herbal medicated ointments. The China Shaoxing Yellow Wine Group Corporation produces 110,000 tons annually for domestic and overseas markets.

== Zhufu folk customs ==
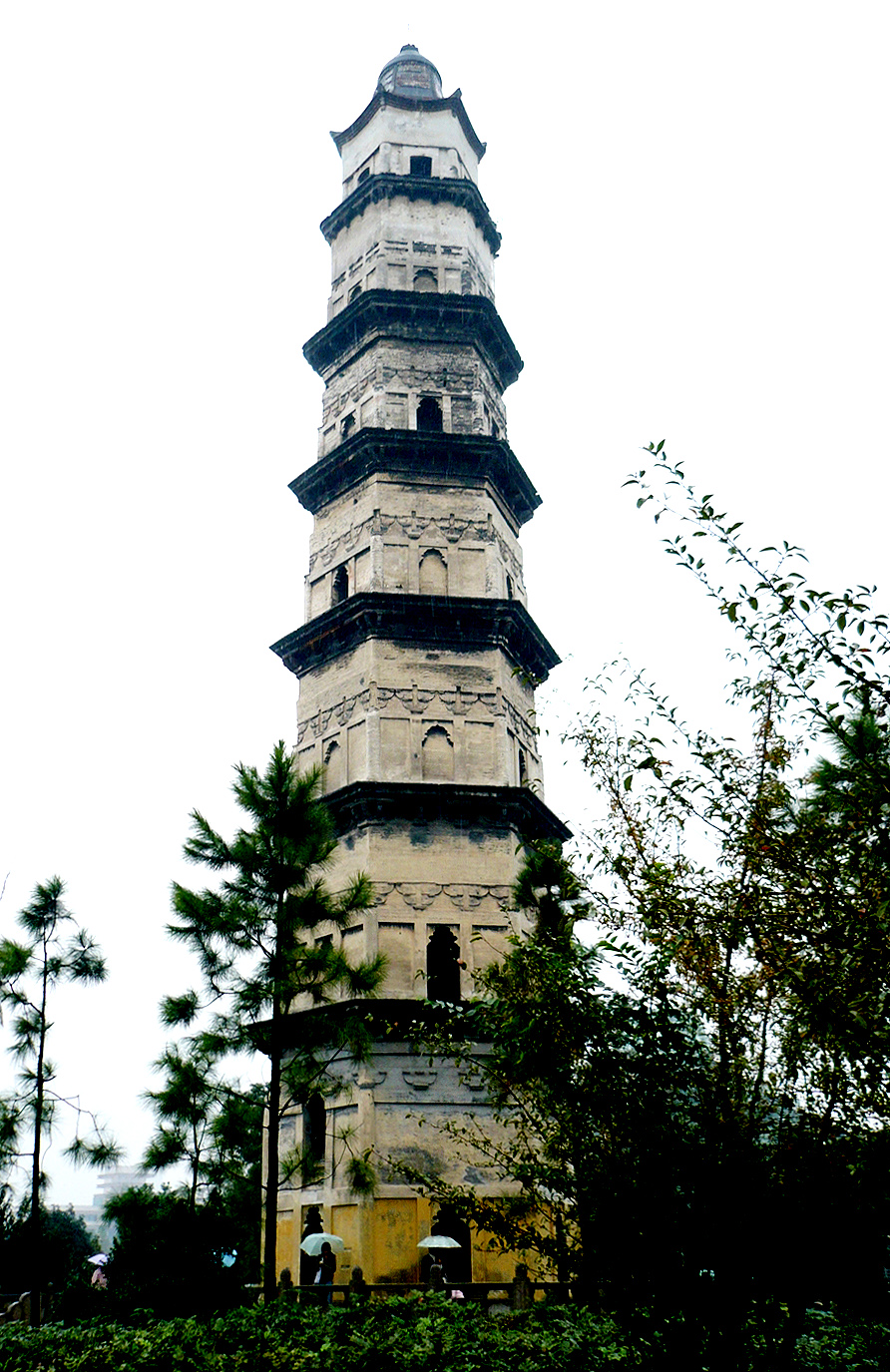
The Dashan Pagoda in Shaoxing

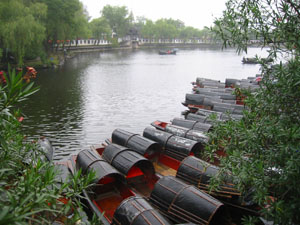
Boats in Donghu (east lake), a lake in Shaoxing

Due to its long history, Shaoxing has accumulated and handed down a characteristic culture known as "Yue Culture". As an important part of Yue Culture and a traditional folk custom of Shaoxing, Zhufu (Chinese: 祝福; lit. 'worshipping the God of Blessing') still has great influence on Shaoxing people and their lives.

=== History and background ===
Zhufu is also called Zuofu and is the most prominent annual sacrificial ceremony in Shaoxing. The gods worshipped are Nanchao Shengzhong (南朝圣众) and Huangshan Xinan (黄山西南). They have been worshipped since the Yuan dynasty (1279–1368 CE). Legend holds that when the government of the Song dynasty (960–1279 CE) was overthrown by the Mongolian army and replaced by the Yuan dynasty, the original Song citizens, namely the Han people, were extremely afraid of the newly established minority political power. They secretly offered sacrifices at midnight to the emperors of South Song dynasty and those patriotic martyrs who died to save the nation.

Nanchao Shengzhong refers to a group of martyrs, who died in the war of resistance against the Mongolian invasion, including Emperor Huaizong of Song, last emperor of the Southern Song dynasty, Wen Tianxiang, scholar-general of Southern Song dynasty, who was captured but didn't give in to the enemy and later was killed by the Yuan Government, and Lu Xiufu, the Southern Song Prime Minister who committed suicide, together with Emperor Huaizong and 800 other officials and members of the imperial court. Huangshan Xinan refers to two anonymous brothers who sacrificed their lives to save civilians from being killed by the Mongolian army. In memory of the brothers, the local people named the place where they were killed after them and offered sacrifice to a portrait or statue of the brothers.

Records show that the Mongolian nobility, the ruling class of the Yuan dynasty, treated the Han people harshly, such that the Han people created and cleverly disguised their gods Nanchao Shengzhong and Huangshan Xinan in order to mourn for the lost nation and its patriotic martyrs whilst praying for their blessing. The ruling class knew only of the ostensible purpose of the annual sacrificial ceremony, believing it was the means to entertain the God of Blessing and pray for a good harvest the next year as well as harmony. The ceremony was handed down from generation to generation and finally became a convention whilst its political meaning gradually dimmed. It became a pure sacrificial ceremony, held annually to offer thanks to the God of Blessing for all his blessings and to pray for the next year's blessing.

=== Dates ===
Zhufu is often held during the period between 24 December and 28 December according to the Chinese lunar calendar. Shaoxing people first choose an auspicious day according to the Chinese lunar calendar to hold the ceremony. In Shaoxing, the days between 20 December and 30 December of the Chinese lunar calendar are called nights instead of days so as to remind homemakers that the Spring Festival is approaching and they should hurry up to prepare for Zhufu and the Spring Festival.

=== Ceremonial rite ===
Thereafter, the officiant of the ceremony who is usually the man of the house, lights incense and red candles, hangs golden and silver Taiding made of paper on the left and right candleholders, puts cushions for kneeling on the ground in order, and inserts a Mazhang Stick, which represents Nanchao Shengzhong or Huangshan Xinan into the prepared holder. Females are not allowed to be present whilst the sacrifice is underway. After tasks are completed, the male members of the family successively kneel down facing the main door and kowtow to the god. At that moment there are many taboos. For example, the wine should not be poured from a cup, and chopsticks should not fall into the ground. Silence is also maintained to avoid taboos.

When all is prepared, the officiant pours wine for those present. They hold their wine cups high as quickly as possible to see the god out. Then the officiant burns the Mazhang Stick together with golden and silver Taiding in the courtyard. He cuts the tongues from the chicken and goose then throws them on to the roof of the house at the same time and praying to the god to take away the tongues which symbolize possible calamities emanating from the spoken word. Finally, the officiant put a cup of wine with tea onto the ashes of Mazhang Stick signifying the end of Zhufu. Ancestor worship follows the ceremony and, although similar to Zhufu, differences do exist. After worship, the family sits down at tables and eat Fuli together, which they call Sanfu or sharing the blessings.

As a featured folk custom, Zhufu has been handed down and well protected as part of Shaoxing's cultural heritage. It is reputable because of its special origin. It was widely popularized by Lu Xun (1881–1936, Shaoxing-born) in his short story Zhufu (祝福), which he named after the sacrificial ceremony. Whilst deeply moved by the ill-fated leading character of the novel, readers get to learn the details of the Zhufu tradition.

== Sports ==
The Shaoxing Baseball & Softball Sports Centre is the largest baseball and softball venue in China conforming to international competition standards. The stadium was built for the 2022 Asian Games, which hosted the baseball and softball events.

In September 2024, Shaoxing hosted the 2024 U-23 Baseball World Cup, which was the first international baseball world cup held in mainland China.

== Metro ==
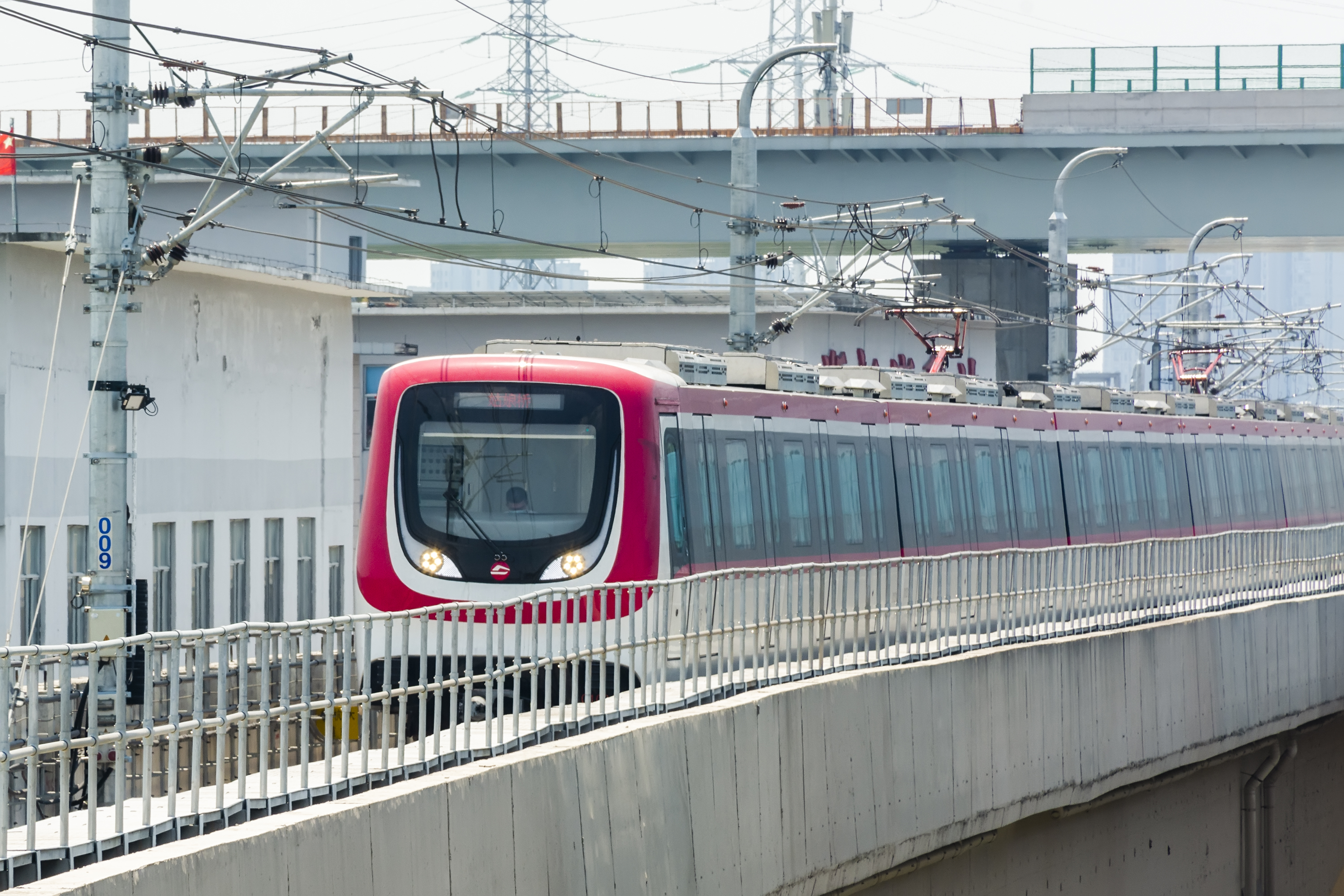
A line 1 train of the Shaoxing metro

Shaoxing has a metro system with 3 operational lines (one branch line), one under construction line and two extension projects. It has 61.9 km of total mileage and 43 stations in total. Line 1 of the Shaoxing Metro connects the Yuecheng and Keqiao districts with Line 5 of the Hangzhou Metro at its western terminus station Guniangqiao. This created a direct metro link between the two cities. Phase 2 of the Shaoxing Metro Line 2 will connect the Yuecheng and Shangyu districts.

== Notable people ==
- Yu the Great c.2123–2025 BC, a legendary ruler in ancient China who was famed for his introduction of flood control, his establishment of the Xia dynasty which inaugurated dynastic rule in China, and his upright moral character. Died and buried in Shaoxing.
- Gou Jian c.520BC–465BC, King of Yue Kingdom.
- Fan Li 536-448BC, politician, philosopher, military theorist, and economist, helped King Yue conquer Wu.
- Xi Shi 506 BC–?, one of the Four Beauties of ancient China, who was born and lived in Zhuji county, Shaoxing.
- Wang Xizhi, 303–361, calligrapher, lived in Shaoxing.
- Lu You, 1125–1209, poet and literati of the Southern Song period, who famously encountered his former wife in Shen Garden.
- Xu Wei, 1521–1593, Ming dynasty painter, born in Shaoxing.
- Wang Shouren, 1472–1529, Ming dynasty politician and scholar.
- Liu Zongzhou 1578–1645, also known as Jishan, later Ming politician and scholar, born in Shaoxing.
- Zhang Dai, 1597–1684, essayist and historian of the later Ming period, born in Shaoxing.
- Cai Yuanpei, 1868–1940, educator and thinker, born in Shaoxing.
- Qiu Jin, 1875–1907, feminist republican revolutionary, raised in Shaoxing.
- Lu Xun, (aka Zhou Shuren) 1881–1936, writer, leading figure of modern Chinese literature, born in Shaoxing.
- Ma Yinchu, 1882–1982, educator and economist, born in Shengzhou, Shaoxing.
- Chen Yi, 1883–1950, Kuomintang soldier and politician, born in Dongpuzhen (東浦鎮), Shaoxing.
- Zhou Zuoren, 1885–1967, essayist and translator, brother of Lu Xun, born in Shaoxing.
- Chu Kochen, 1890–1974, meteorologist, geographer, and educator, born in Shaoxing
- Zhou Enlai, 1898–1976, first Premier of the People's Republic of China, family ancestral roots in Shaoxing
- Zhao Zhongyao, 1902–1998, theoretical physicist.
- Hsu Tao-Chiuh (1917–2003), cell biologist, geneticist, cytogeneticist, was born in Shaoxing
- Wong Tin Lam, 1927–2010, Hong Kong screenwriter, producer, director, and actor, father of Wong Jing.
- Tong Jinquan, 1954–, real estate billionaire.
- Dai Xiangyu, 1984–, actor.

== See also ==
- Jiangnan
- Shaoxing Metro
