= Tong Jinquan =

Chinese businessman

- Born: 1954 (age 71–72); Shaoxing, Zhejiang Province, China
- Occupations: Chairman, Summit Property Development
- Children: 2

Tong Jinquan (Chinese: 童锦泉; born 1954) is a Chinese businessman and real estate developer who is the chairman of Summit Property Development.

== Early life ==
Tong was born in Shaoxing, Zhejiang Province, China in 1954, the seventh of nine children of parents who ran a grocery store.

== Career ==
Tong started work in 1975, at a local table tennis equipment factory. By 1983, Tong had become general manager at another sporting goods company. In 1992, Tong founded Summit Property Development in Shanghai, China.

Tong's company, Summit, has invested more than US$1 billion in a commercial complex in Chengdu. He has significant stakes in three Singapore REITs: Viva Industrial, Cambridge Industrial, Sabana Shari'ah Compliant Industrial Trust, and Suntec. According to Forbes, Tong has a net worth of $4.7 billion, as of January 2015.

== Personal life ==
Tong is married with two children and lives in Shanghai.
