= Matsunobori Shigeo =

Japanese sumo wrestler

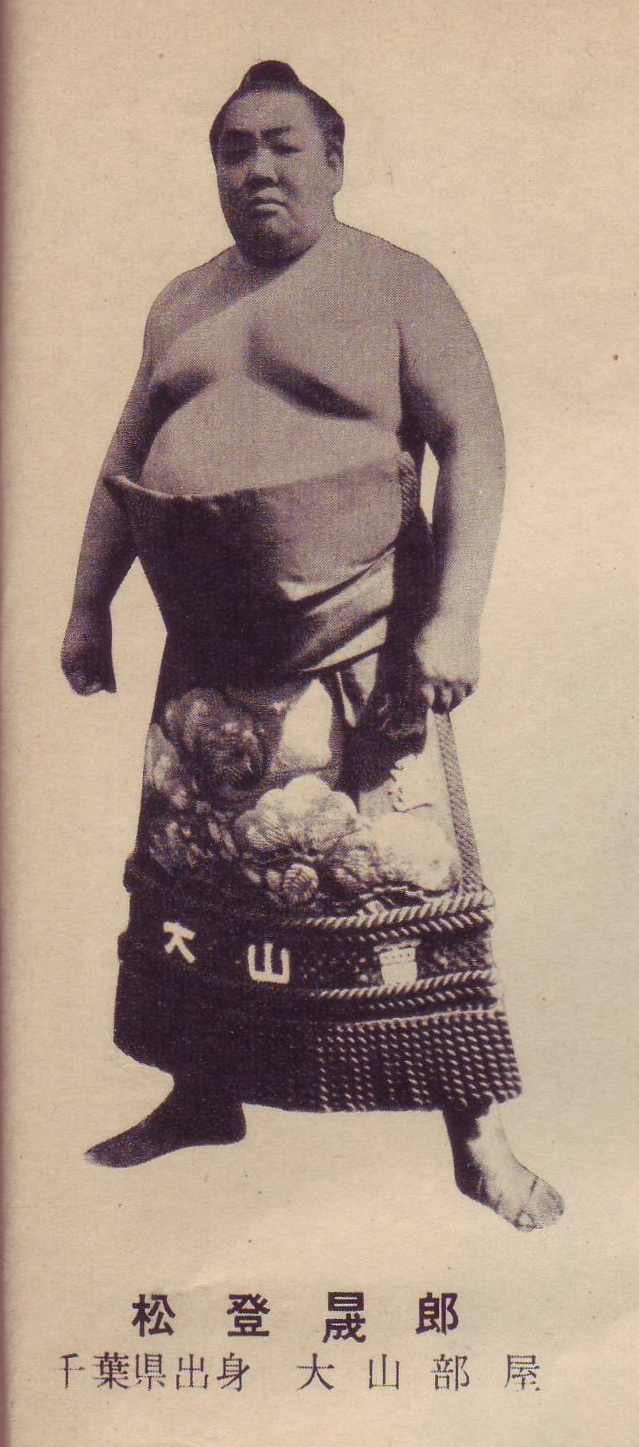

Personal information
- Native name: 松登 晟郎
- Born: Fukutarō Nagai; 20 July 1924 Matsudo, Chiba, Japan
- Died: 21 April 1986 (aged 61)
- Height: 1.72 m (5 ft 7 1/2 in)
- Weight: 154 kg (340 lb)

Sport
- Sport: Sumo
- Retired: November 1961
- Heya: Ōyama
- Record: 469–442–29
- Debut: January 1941
- Highest rank: Ōzeki (January 1956)
- Elder name: Ōyama
- Special Prizes: Outstanding Performance (2); Fighting Spirit (1)
- Gold Stars: 2 (Haguroyama, Chiyonoyama)
- Updated on June 2020

Matsunobori Shigeo (20 July 1924 – 21 April 1986) was a sumo wrestler from Matsudo Chiba, Japan. He fought for the now defunct Ōyama stable, joining in 1941. He reached the top makuuchi division in 1951 and made the second highest ōzeki rank (alongside Wakanohana) in 1956, after finishing as a runner-up to Kagamisato in the September 1955 tournament. He was an ōzeki for fifteen tournaments, although he lost the rank at the end of 1958. He retired in November 1961, and in his role as an elder of the Japan Sumo Association he became the head of Ōyama stable in January 1962 upon the death of his old stablemaster, ex-sekiwake Takanobori. He produced one sekitori, the maegashira Daihi, who retired in 1983. Shortly after Ōyama's death in April 1986 the stable was wound up and its two remaining wrestlers retired.

== Pre-modern top division record ==
- The New Year tournament began and the Spring tournament returned to Osaka in 1953.

Matsunobori Shigeo
-	Spring Haru basho, Tokyo	Summer Natsu basho, Tokyo	Autumn Aki basho, Tokyo
1951	East Jūryō #3; 8–7	West Jūryō #1; 11–4	East Maegashira #16; 10–5
1952	East Maegashira #7; 7–8	West Maegashira #8; 8–7	East Maegashira #4; 9–6 ★
Record given as wins–losses–absences Top division champion Top division runner-up Retired Lower divisions Non-participation Sanshō key: F=Fighting spirit; O=Outstanding performance; T=Technique Also shown: ★=Kinboshi; P=Playoff(s); Divisions: Makuuchi — Jūryō — Makushita — Sandanme — Jonidan — Jonokuchi Makuuchi ranks: Yokozuna — Ōzeki — Sekiwake — Komusubi — Maegashira

-	New Year Hatsu basho, Tokyo	Spring Haru basho, Osaka	Summer Natsu basho, Tokyo	Autumn Aki basho, Tokyo
1953	East Komusubi #1; 9–6	East Komusubi #1; 6–9	East Maegashira #3; 10–5	West Sekiwake #1; 6–9
1954	West Maegashira #2; 11–4; F★	West Sekiwake #1; 8–7	East Sekiwake #2; 9–6; O	East Sekiwake #2; 9–6
1955	West Sekiwake #2; 8–7	West Sekiwake #2; 11–4	East Sekiwake #1; 8–7	East Sekiwake #1; 13–2; O
1956	West Ōzeki #1; 5–10	East Ōzeki #2; 9–6	East Ōzeki #2; 9–6	East Ōzeki #2; 9–6
Record given as wins–losses–absences Top division champion Top division runner-up Retired Lower divisions Non-participation Sanshō key: F=Fighting spirit; O=Outstanding performance; T=Technique Also shown: ★=Kinboshi; P=Playoff(s); Divisions: Makuuchi — Jūryō — Makushita — Sandanme — Jonidan — Jonokuchi Makuuchi ranks: Yokozuna — Ōzeki — Sekiwake — Komusubi — Maegashira

== Modern top division record ==
- Since the addition of the Kyushu tournament in 1957 and the Nagoya tournament in 1958, the yearly schedule has remained unchanged.

Year	January Hatsu basho, Tokyo	March Haru basho, Osaka	May Natsu basho, Tokyo	July Nagoya basho, Nagoya	September Aki basho, Tokyo	November Kyūshū basho, Fukuoka
1957	West Ōzeki #1; 9–6	West Ōzeki #1; 9–6	East Ōzeki #2; 8–7	Not held	East Ōzeki #2; 6–9	East Ōzeki #2; 9–6
1958	East Ōzeki #2; Sat out due to injury 0–0–15	West Ōzeki #1; 6–9	West Ōzeki #2; 8–7	West Ōzeki #2; 5–10	West Ōzeki #2; 1–5–9	West Ōzeki #2; 6–9
1959	West Sekiwake #1; 3–12	West Maegashira #2; 9–6	East Komusubi #1; 6–9	East Maegashira #1; 5–10	West Maegashira #5; 6–9	East Maegashira #10; 8–7
1960	East Maegashira #7; 7–8	West Maegashira #8; 6–9	West Maegashira #11; 7–8	West Maegashira #11; 8–7	West Maegashira #6; 7–8	West Maegashira #7; 4–11
1961	West Maegashira #15; 10–5	East Maegashira #9; 7–8	West Maegashira #9; 8–7	West Maegashira #7; 7–8	West Maegashira #6; 5–10	East Maegashira #11; Retired; 4–11
Record given as wins–losses–absences Top division champion Top division runner-up Retired Lower divisions Non-participation Sanshō key: F=Fighting spirit; O=Outstanding performance; T=Technique Also shown: ★=Kinboshi; P=Playoff(s); Divisions: Makuuchi — Jūryō — Makushita — Sandanme — Jonidan — Jonokuchi Makuuchi ranks: Yokozuna — Ōzeki — Sekiwake — Komusubi — Maegashira

== See also ==
- Glossary of sumo terms
- List of past sumo wrestlers
- List of ōzeki
