= Dashan Pagoda =

Chinese pagoda

- 大善塔
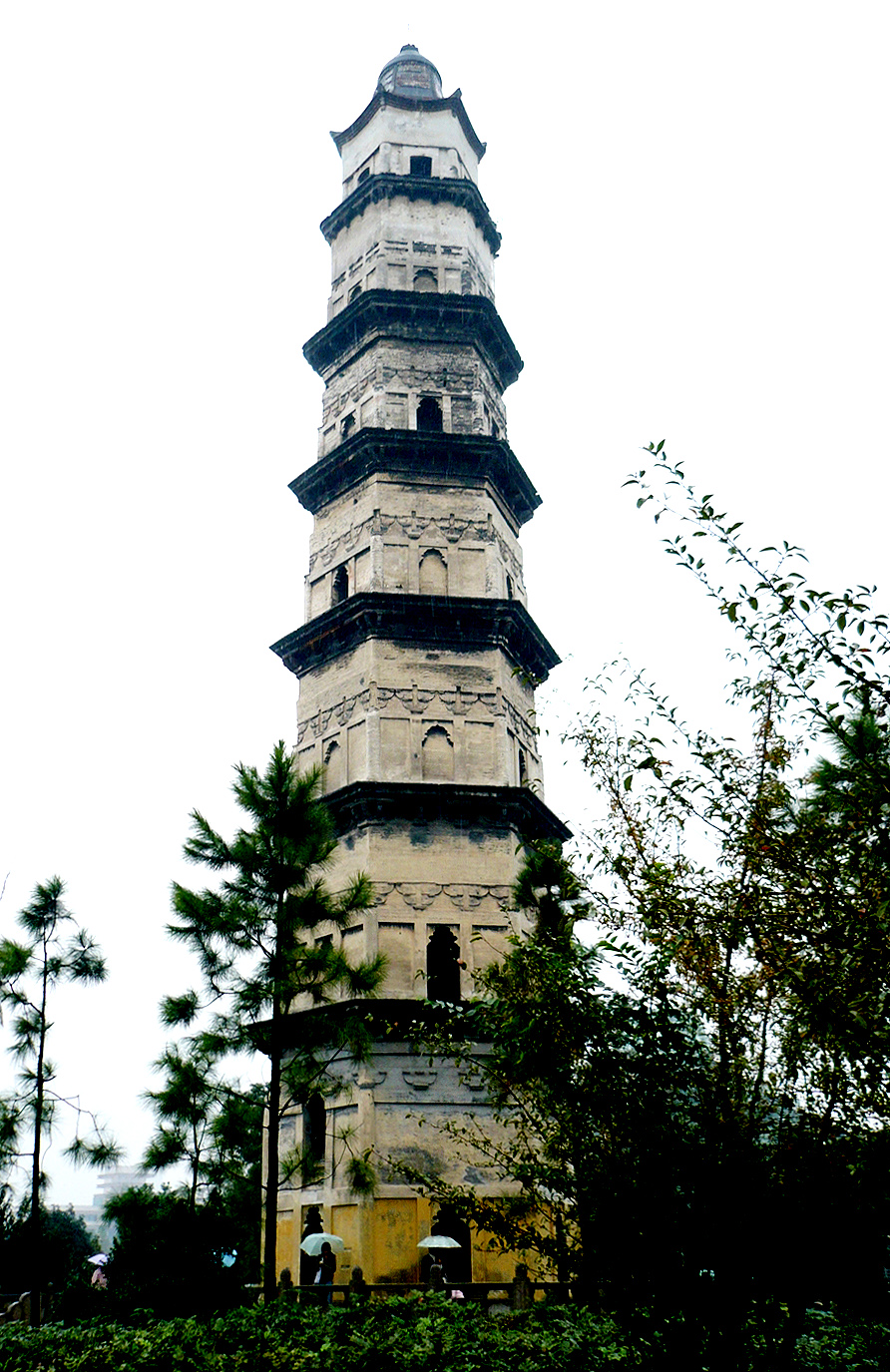

- Location within Zhejiang Location within China

Religion
- Affiliation: Buddhism

Location
- Location: Shaoxing, Zhejiang Province
- Country: China
- Coordinates: 30.005225°N 120.576431°E

Dashan Pagoda
- Simplified Chinese: 大善塔
- Traditional Chinese: 大善塔
Transcriptions
Standard Mandarin
- Hanyu Pinyin: Dàshàn tǎ

Dashan Pagoda is a pagoda in Shaoxing, Zhejiang Province, China. Originally built during the Song dynasty in 504, the tower has been destroyed and rebuilt many times. The current incarnation of the tower was built during the Qing dynasty in 1669, and renovated in 1957.
