= Daihi Susumu =

Sumo wrestler

Personal information
- Native name: 大飛 進
- Born: Susumu Ogura; 16 October 1952 (age 74) Nagoya, Aichi, Japan
- Height: 1.84 m (6 ft 1/2 in)
- Weight: 123 kg (271 lb)

Sport
- Sport: Sumo
- Retired: May, 1983
- Heya: Oyama
- Record: 468-468-5
- Debut: March, 1968
- Highest rank: Maegashira 2 (May, 1977)
- Elder name: Oyama
- Championships: 1 (Sandanme)
- Updated on Sep. 2012

Daihi Susumu (born 16 October 1952 as Susumu Ogura) is a former sumo wrestler from Nagoya, Aichi, Japan.

== Career ==
He made his professional debut in March 1968, and reached the top division in January 1977. His highest rank was maegashira 2. For much of his active career he was known under the shikona of Onobori, before switching to Daihi in 1978.

== Retirement from sumo ==
He retired in May 1983 and became an elder in the Japan Sumo Association under the name Yamahibiki and coached at Oyama stable. In April 1986 his old stablemaster (ex-ōzeki Matsunobori) died and Daihi took over the stable and the Oyama name. The stable was shut down in June 1986 and he became a coach at Takasago stable. He was involved in expanding the number of official sumo techniques from 70 to 82 in 2000, the first major changes for 40 years. He moved to the now defunct Azumazeki stable in December 2011. He reached the retirement age for elders of 65 in October 2017, but stayed with the Sumo Association for an additional five years as a consultant. In February 2020 he moved to the Hakkaku stable. The Japan Sumo Association announced his retirement effective August 31, 2022, slightly ahead of what would have been his 70th birthday.

== Fighting style ==
Daihi preferred grappling techniques (yotsu-sumo). His favoured grip on his opponent’s mawashi was hidari-yotsu, a right hand outside, left hand inside position. His most common winning kimarite were yori-kiri (force out) and uwatenage (outer arm throw).

== Career record ==
Daihi Susumu
Year	January Hatsu basho, Tokyo	March Haru basho, Osaka	May Natsu basho, Tokyo	July Nagoya basho, Nagoya	September Aki basho, Tokyo	November Kyūshū basho, Fukuoka
1968	x	(Maezumo)	East Jonokuchi #12; 4–3	West Jonidan #88; 4–3	West Jonidan #60; 3–4	West Jonidan #63; 4–3
1969	West Jonidan #46; 3–4	West Jonidan #52; 4–3	West Jonidan #33; 4–3	West Jonidan #10; 3–4	West Jonidan #19; 5–2	West Sandanme #85; 2–5
1970	East Jonidan #8; 5–2	East Sandanme #67; 4–3	West Sandanme #49; 4–3	West Sandanme #30; 2–5	East Sandanme #50; 4–3	East Sandanme #39; 3–4
1971	West Sandanme #47; 4–3	West Sandanme #35; 3–4	East Sandanme #45; 5–2	West Sandanme #18; 4–3	East Sandanme #8; 2–5	East Sandanme #30; 4–3
1972	West Sandanme #17; 3–4	East Sandanme #29; 5–2	West Sandanme #6; 3–4	West Sandanme #12; 4–3	East Sandanme #5; 7–0; Champion	West Makushita #23; 3–4
1973	East Makushita #29; 2–5	East Makushita #49; 4–3	West Makushita #43; 3–4	East Makushita #56; 5–2	West Makushita #35; 5–2	East Makushita #20; 3–4
1974	East Makushita #28; 5–2	West Makushita #15; 5–2	West Makushita #4; 6–1	West Jūryō #12; 6–9	East Makushita #2; 3–4	West Makushita #5; 3–4
1975	East Makushita #10; 4–3	East Makushita #7; 3–4	West Makushita #11; 5–2	West Makushita #3; 5–2	East Makushita #1; 4–3	West Jūryō #13; 8–7
1976	East Jūryō #10; 7–8	East Jūryō #12; 8–7	West Jūryō #9; 8–7	East Jūryō #6; 7–8	East Jūryō #9; 7–7	East Jūryō #4; 10–5
1977	West Maegashira #12; 8–7	East Maegashira #8; 9–6	East Maegashira #2; 2–13	East Maegashira #12; 9–6	East Maegashira #8; 4–10–1	West Jūryō #1; 6–9
1978	West Jūryō #3; 7–8	West Jūryō #6; 8–7	East Jūryō #5; 6–9	West Jūryō #8; 2–11–2	West Makushita #10; 3–4	East Makushita #17; 5–2
1979	West Makushita #8; 3–4	West Makushita #14; 6–1	East Makushita #2; 5–2	East Jūryō #8; 7–8	East Jūryō #9; 8–7	West Jūryō #7; 6–9
1980	West Jūryō #10; 8–7	West Jūryō #8; 6–9	West Jūryō #12; 8–7	West Jūryō #10; 9–6	East Jūryō #5; 7–8	West Jūryō #6; 6–7–2
1981	West Jūryō #8; 8–7	East Jūryō #4; 4–11	West Jūryō #11; 9–6	West Jūryō #5; 8–7	West Jūryō #3; 10–5	East Maegashira #12; 7–8
1982	West Maegashira #14; 5–10	West Jūryō #2; 6–9	East Jūryō #7; 7–8	West Jūryō #7; 6–9	East Jūryō #11; 7–8	West Makushita #1; 2–5
1983	West Makushita #14; 4–3	East Makushita #11; 2–5	West Makushita #32; Retired; 3–4	x	x	x
Record given as wins–losses–absences Top division champion Top division runner-up Retired Lower divisions Non-participation Sanshō key: F=Fighting spirit; O=Outstanding performance; T=Technique Also shown: ★=Kinboshi; P=Playoff(s); Divisions: Makuuchi — Jūryō — Makushita — Sandanme — Jonidan — Jonokuchi Makuuchi ranks: Yokozuna — Ōzeki — Sekiwake — Komusubi — Maegashira

== See also ==
- Glossary of sumo terms
- List of past sumo wrestlers
- List of sumo elders
