= Takashi Ohyama =

Japanese dentist

Takashi Ohyama (大山喬史, Ōyama Takashi) has been the President of Tokyo Medical and Dental University since April 2008. He became a professor in their Stomatognathic dysfunction Department in May 1987 and Vice-President of the University in November 2005.
