= Ōyama Station =

Ōyama Station (大山駅) is the name of multiple train stations in Japan:

- Ōyama Station (Kagoshima)
- Ōyama Station (Tokyo)

== See also ==
- Oyama Station
