= Big Mountain Air Force Station =

- IATA: BMX; ICAO: PABM; FAA LID: 37AK

Summary
- Airport type: Military
- Owner: U.S. Air Force
- Location: Big Mountain, Alaska
- Elevation AMSL: 663 ft (202 m)
- Coordinates: 59°21′44″N 155°15′32″W

Map
- Location of airport in Alaska

Runways
Direction	Length		Surface
Direction	ft	m	Surface
7/25	4,200	1,280	Gravel
- Source: Federal Aviation Administration

Big Mountain Air Force Station (IATA: BMX, ICAO: PABM, FAA LID: 37AK) is a military use airstrip located near Big Mountain, in the Lake and Peninsula Borough of the U.S. state of Alaska. The airstrip was built to support the Big Mountain Radio Relay Station, an abandoned Air Force facility located 220 miles (350 km) southwest of Anchorage on the south shore of Iliamna Lake.

== History ==
Big Mountain RRS was constructed in 1956 as part of the White Alice Communication System (WACS), a defense communication network and aircraft warning system established across Alaska during the Cold War. Advances in technology made the Big Mountain installation obsolete and it was abandoned in 1979. The United States Air Force still owns 440 acres (1.8 km^{2}) at the site, which consists of a Lower Camp alongside the airstrip and an Upper Camp on the top of Big Mountain. There is also a barge landing site at Reindeer Bay that is now owned by the University of Alaska, with surrounding land owned by the State of Alaska.

== Facilities ==
Big Mountain has one runway designated 7/25 with a 4,200 by 145 ft (1,280 x 44 m) gravel surface.
