= Daisen =

Daisen can refer to:

- Mount Daisen (大山) in Tottori Prefecture, Japan
- Daisen, Tottori (大山町), a town in Tottori Prefecture, Japan
- Daisen, Akita (大仙市), a city in Akita Prefecture, Japan
