= Wuyi County, Zhejiang =

Wuyi 武义县
- County
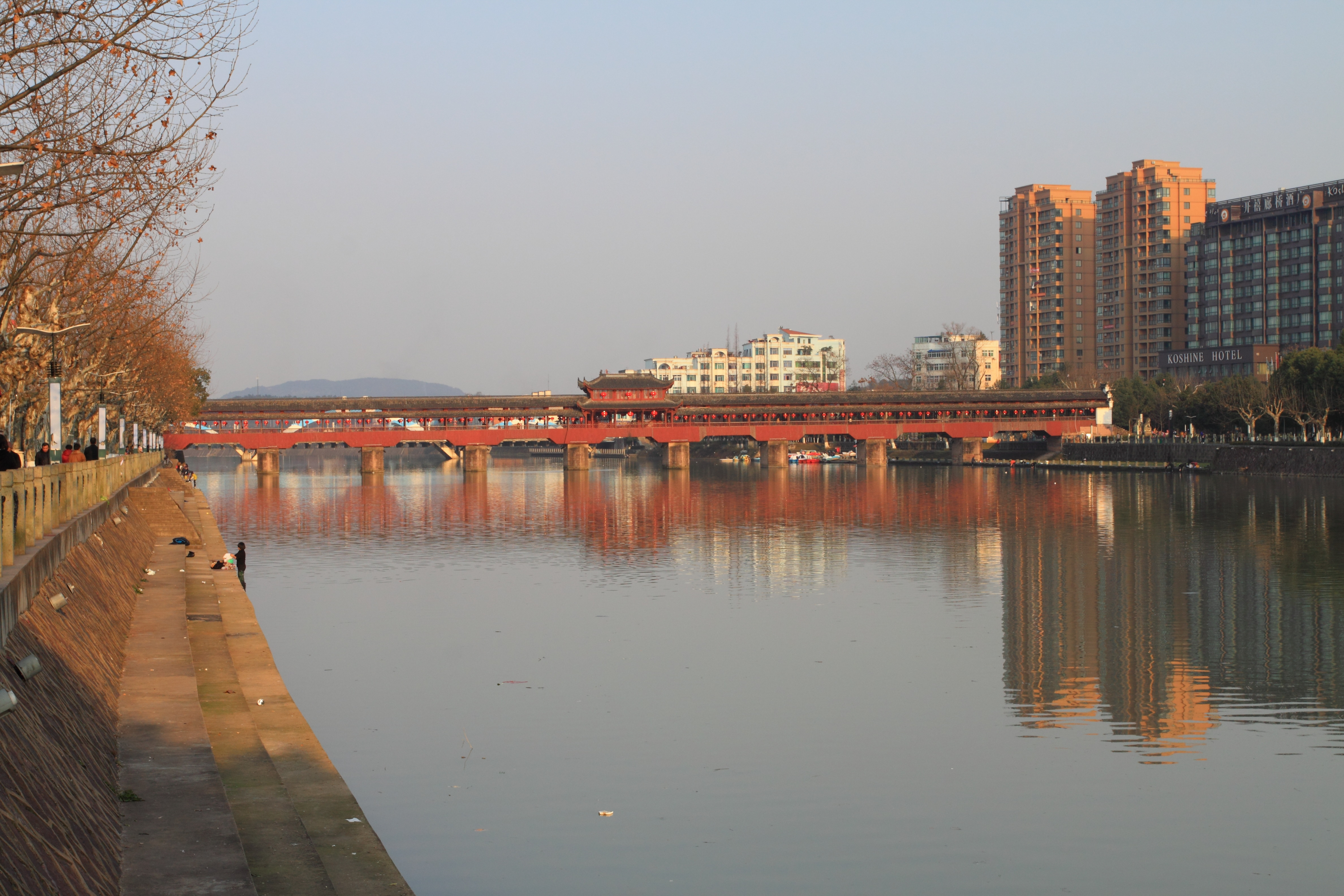

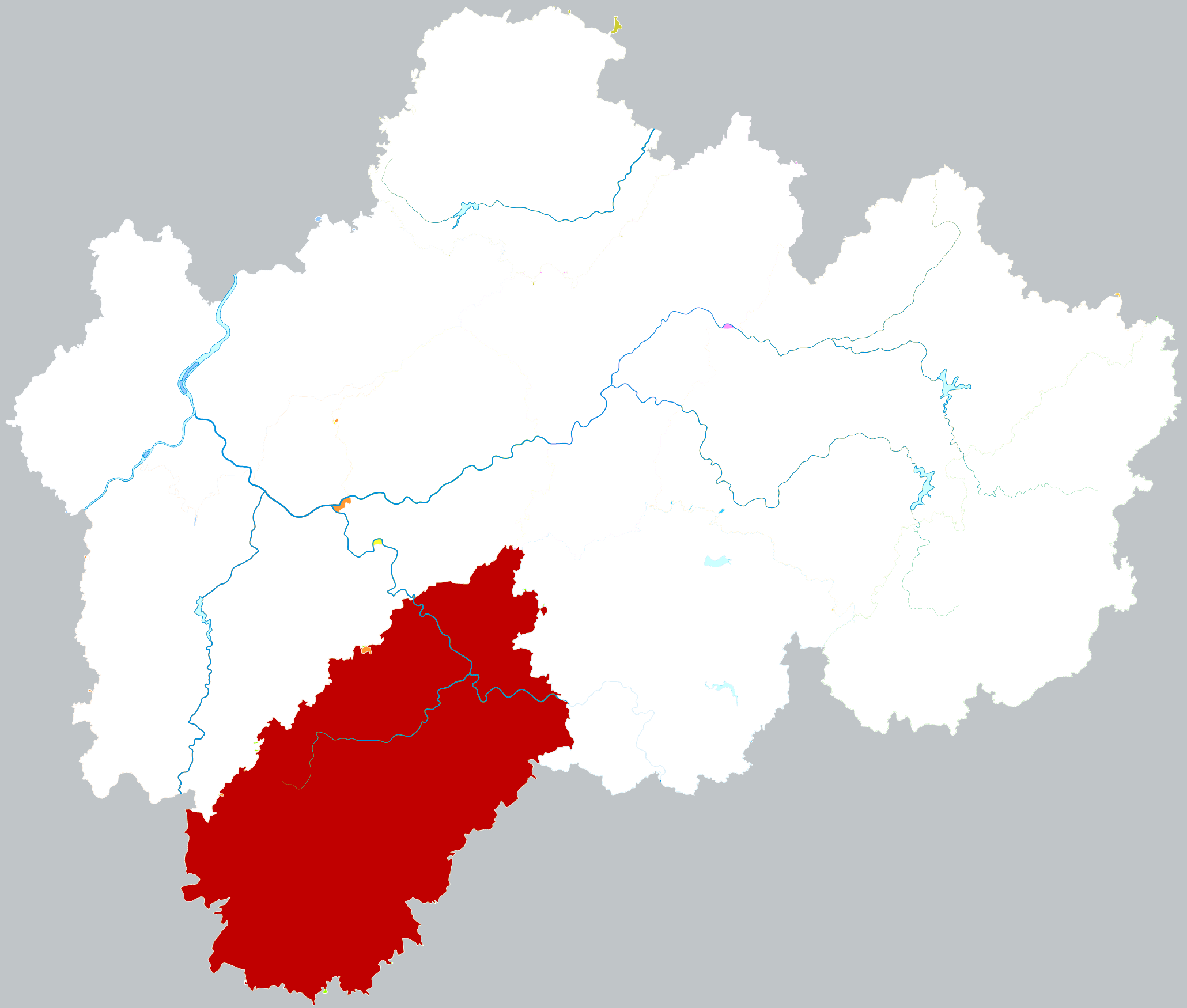
- Location of Wuyi County within Jinhua

- Location of the seat in Zhejiang
- Coordinates: 28.9006°N 119.806°E
- Country: People's Republic of China
- Province: Zhejiang
- Prefecture-level city: Jinhua

Area
  - Total: 1,568.18 km^{2} (605.48 sq mi)

Population (2020)
  - Total: 462,462
- Time zone: UTC+8 (China Standard)
- Postal code: 321200
- Area code: (0)579

Wuyi County (simplified Chinese: 武义县; traditional Chinese: 武義縣; pinyin: Wǔyì Xiàn) is a county in southwest-central Zhejiang province, China. It is under the administration of Jinhua city. It is rich in Fluorite and hot spring resorts.

The local government is located in Lushan avenue.

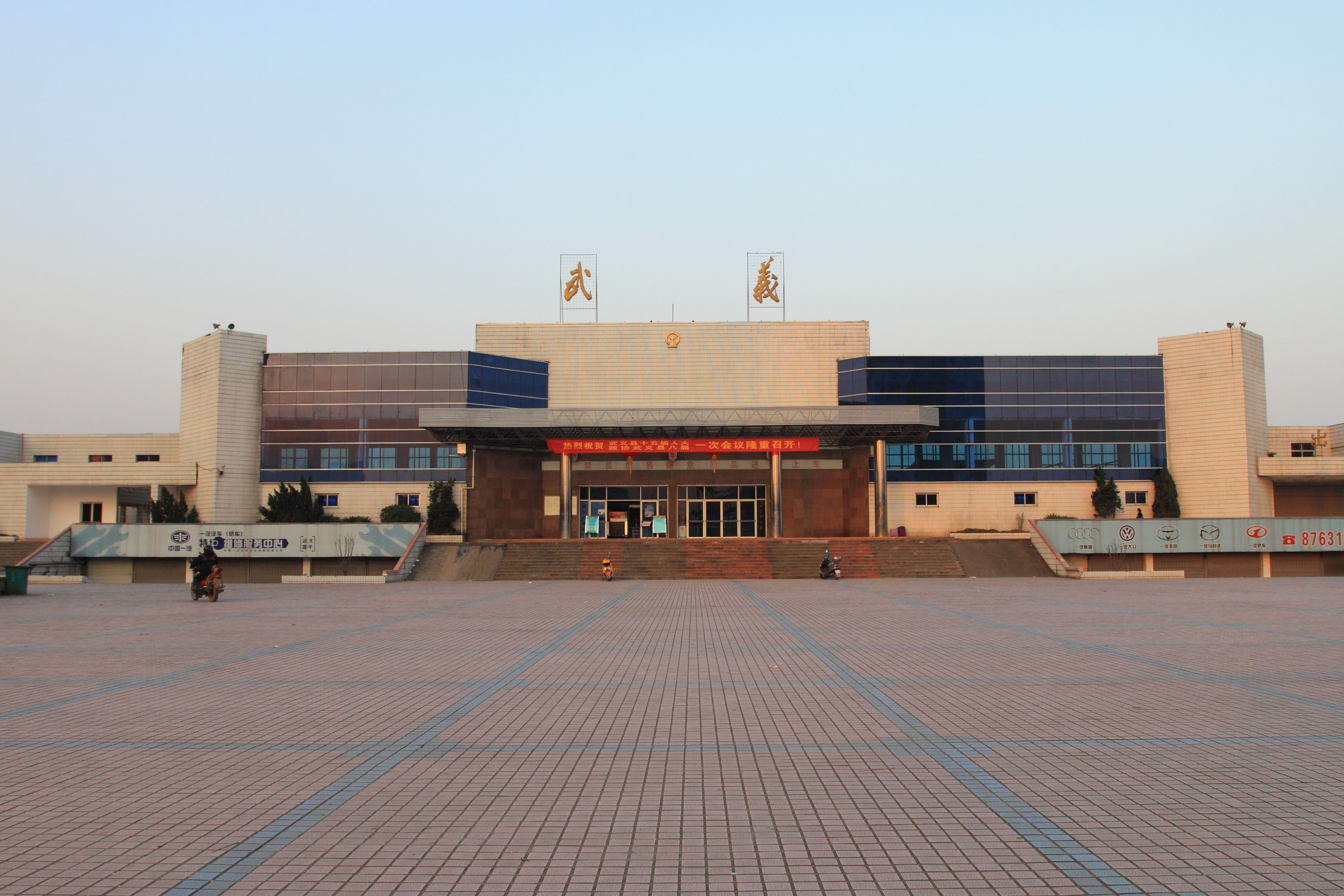
Wuyi Railway Station

== Geography ==
The north and west sides of Wuyi are surrounded by mountains. The most important one, called Niutoushan is 1,560.2 m (5,119 ft) high.

== History ==
At the Autumn period in Chinese history, Wuyi belonged to Yue. During the Qin dynasty until the Han dynasty, it belonged to Wushang. In 691, it was renamed as Wuyi. In 1958, Suanping county became a part of Wuyi, increasing the importance of the city.

== Administrative divisions ==
Subdistricts:

- Baiyang Subdistrict (白洋街道), Hushan Subdistrict (壶山街道), Shuxi Subdistrict (熟溪街道)

Towns:

- Lütan (履坦镇), Tongqin (桐琴镇), Wangzhai (王宅镇), Taoxi (桃溪镇), Quanxi (泉溪镇), Xinzhai (新宅镇), Jiaodao (茭道镇), Liucheng She Ethnic Town (柳城畲族镇)

Townships:

- Datian Township (大田乡), Baimu Township (白姆乡), Yuyuan Township (俞源乡), Tanhong Township (坦洪乡), Xilian Township (西联乡), Sangang Township (三港乡), Daxikou Township (大溪口乡)

== Climate ==
Climate data for Wuyi, elevation 105 m (344 ft), (1991–2020 normals, extremes 1981–2010)
Month	Jan	Feb	Mar	Apr	May	Jun	Jul	Aug	Sep	Oct	Nov	Dec	Year
Record high °C (°F)	26.1 (79.0)	29.7 (85.5)	35.4 (95.7)	34.8 (94.6)	36.8 (98.2)	37.9 (100.2)	41.5 (106.7)	41.9 (107.4)	39.8 (103.6)	37.0 (98.6)	32.9 (91.2)	25.7 (78.3)	41.9 (107.4)
Mean daily maximum °C (°F)	10.2 (50.4)	13.1 (55.6)	17.3 (63.1)	23.5 (74.3)	27.9 (82.2)	30.0 (86.0)	34.8 (94.6)	34.1 (93.4)	29.6 (85.3)	24.6 (76.3)	18.9 (66.0)	12.8 (55.0)	23.1 (73.5)
Daily mean °C (°F)	5.6 (42.1)	7.9 (46.2)	11.9 (53.4)	17.7 (63.9)	22.4 (72.3)	25.3 (77.5)	29.2 (84.6)	28.5 (83.3)	24.5 (76.1)	19.1 (66.4)	13.5 (56.3)	7.5 (45.5)	17.8 (64.0)
Mean daily minimum °C (°F)	2.5 (36.5)	4.4 (39.9)	8.0 (46.4)	13.4 (56.1)	18.2 (64.8)	21.7 (71.1)	24.8 (76.6)	24.5 (76.1)	20.8 (69.4)	15.2 (59.4)	9.8 (49.6)	4.0 (39.2)	13.9 (57.1)
Record low °C (°F)	−7.5 (18.5)	−5.9 (21.4)	−4.2 (24.4)	1.3 (34.3)	8.3 (46.9)	12.1 (53.8)	18.3 (64.9)	18.0 (64.4)	11.4 (52.5)	1.9 (35.4)	−2.9 (26.8)	−9.5 (14.9)	−9.5 (14.9)
Average precipitation mm (inches)	83.6 (3.29)	86.9 (3.42)	156.8 (6.17)	157.0 (6.18)	174.9 (6.89)	291.6 (11.48)	147.2 (5.80)	150.6 (5.93)	109.8 (4.32)	61.5 (2.42)	75.7 (2.98)	66.5 (2.62)	1,562.1 (61.5)
Average precipitation days (≥ 0.1 mm)	13.7	13.2	17.6	16.0	16.7	18.8	13.1	15.1	11.9	8.6	10.8	10.7	166.2
Average snowy days	3.2	2.1	0.7	0	0	0	0	0	0	0	0	1.4	7.4
Average relative humidity (%)	80	78	77	75	76	82	74	75	78	77	80	78	78
Mean monthly sunshine hours	90.9	94.5	110.5	136.8	147.4	127.6	227.7	211.4	158.5	155.2	120.6	116.4	1,697.5
Percentage possible sunshine	28	30	30	35	35	31	54	52	43	44	38	37	38
Source: China Meteorological Administration

== Economy ==
Wuyi's economy is mainly based on agriculture and tourism.

Industrial districts were limited in an attempt to keep the city focused on tourism. However, some of the most important European manufacturers are located in the Huang Long industry area. Wuyi was chosen by companies such as Littlecherry, Ocean Hardware & Plastics, Australian Sino Paper or Sedeenchina that prefer to produce in this small village over other nearby options such as Yiwu.

Some of Wuyi tourist attractions are:

- Guo Donggu ecologic village.
- Shouxian Valley
- Qingfeng Zai mountain
- Yanfu temple
- Yuyuan village
- Shuxi bridge
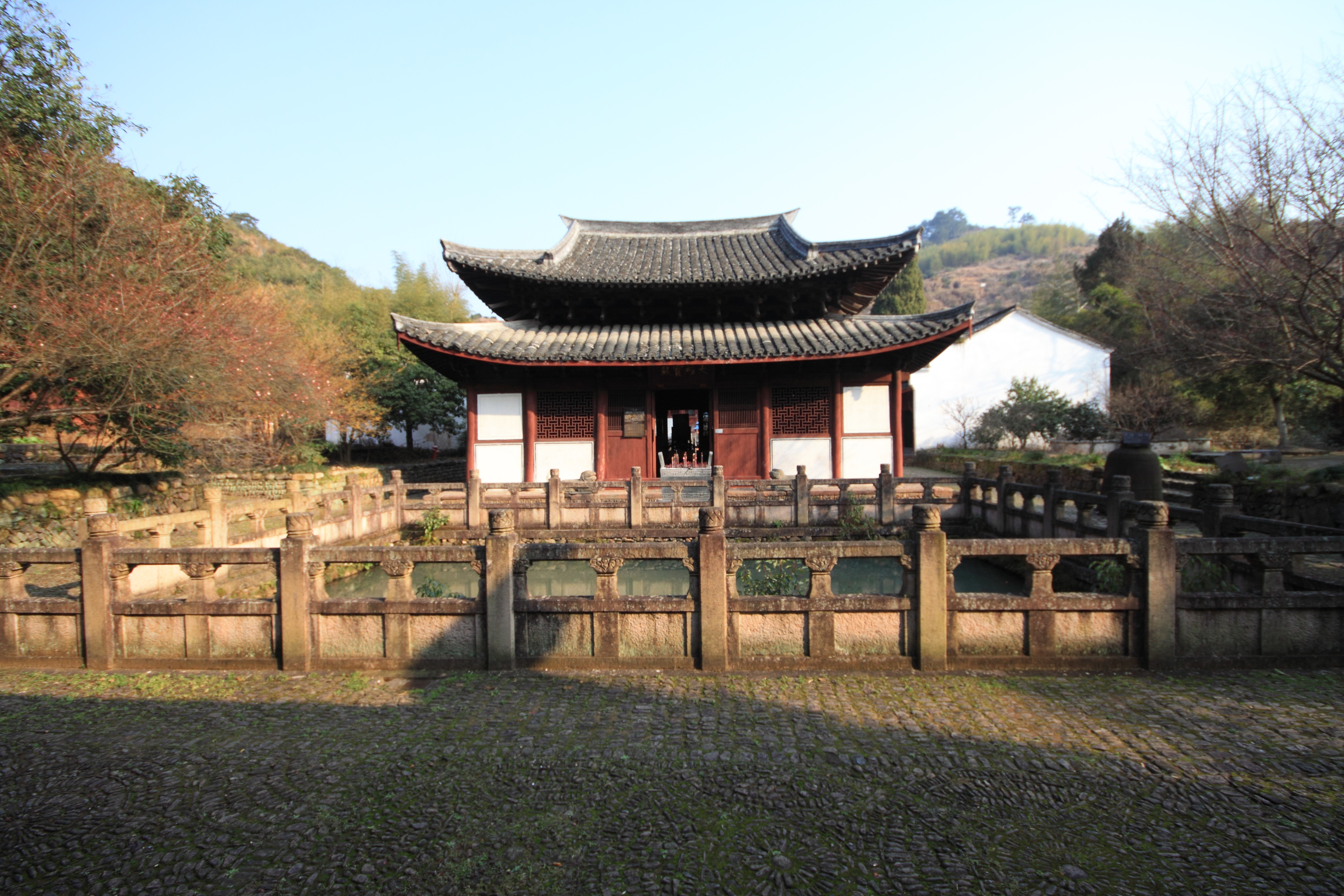
Yanfu Temple (延福寺)

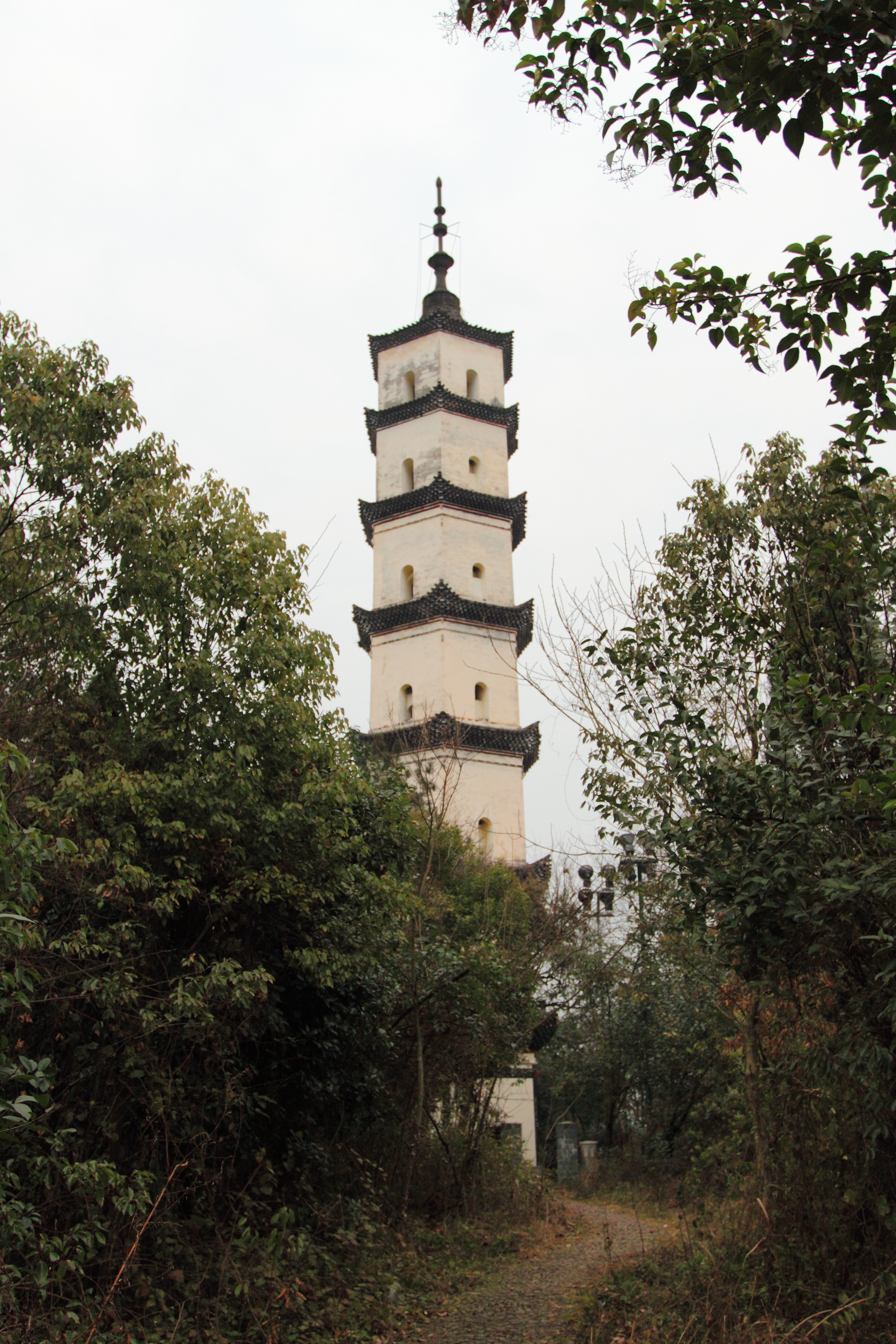
Fabao Xianglong Pagoda (发宝象龙塔)

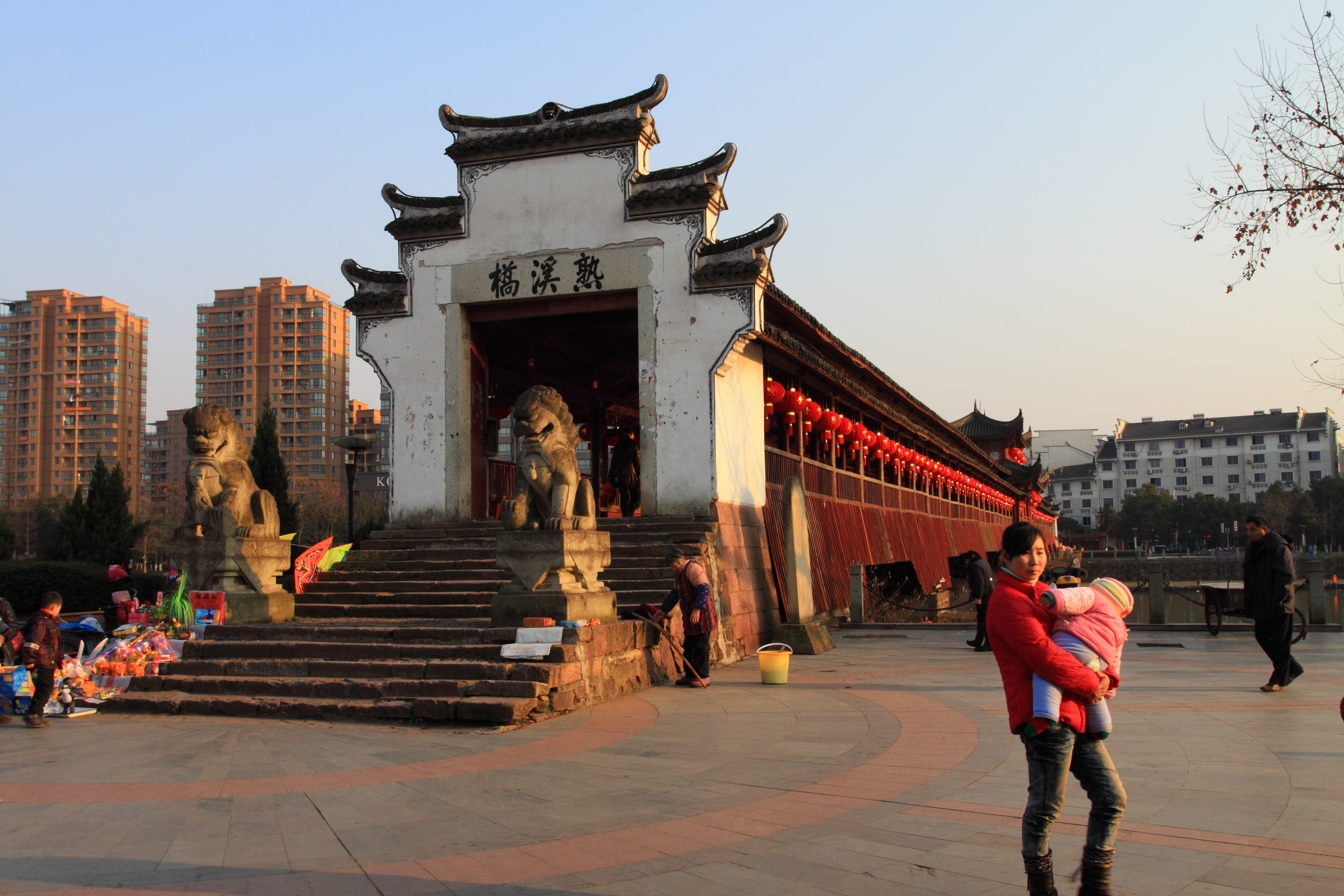
Shuxi Bridge (熟溪桥)

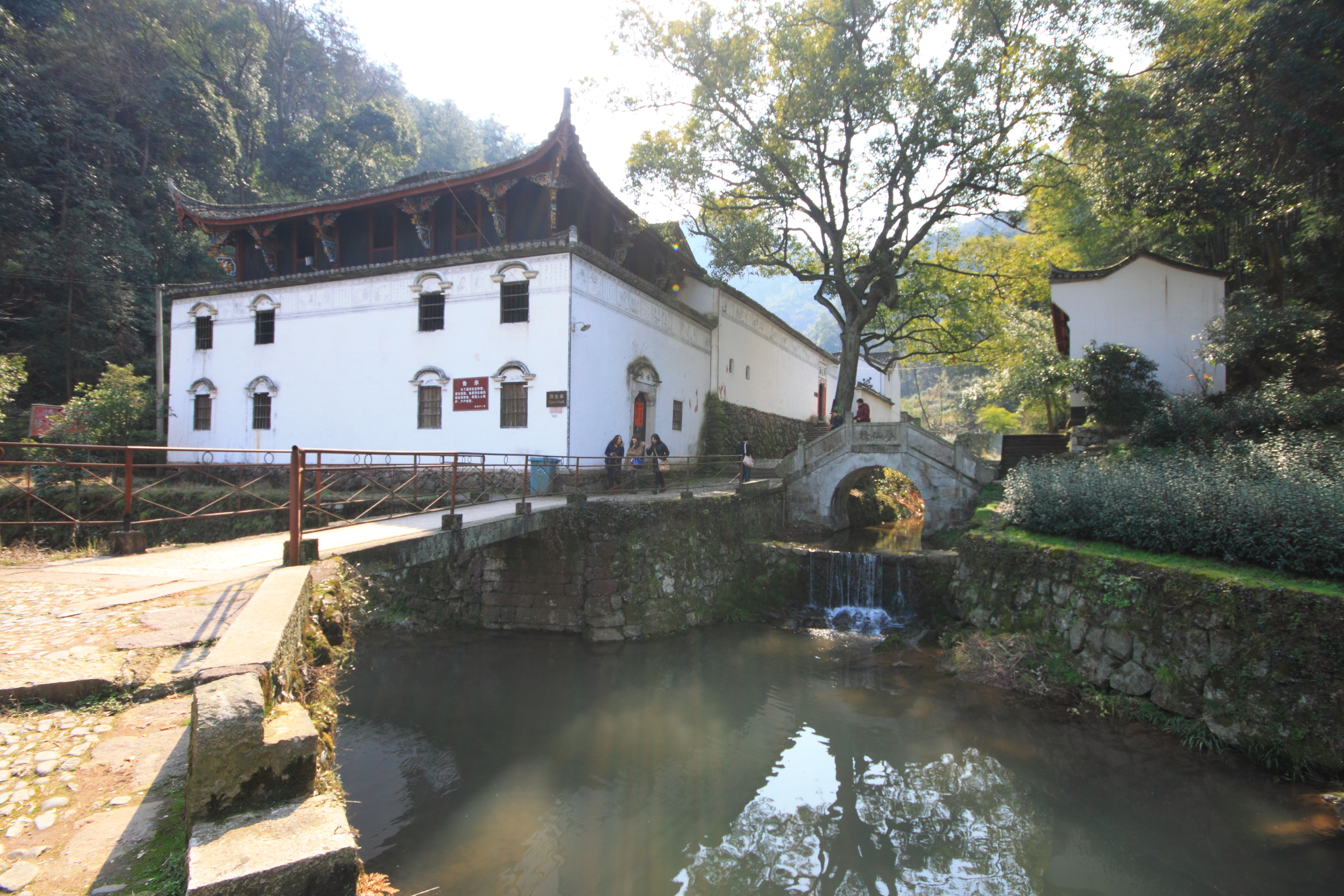
Yuyuan Village (俞源村)
