= Yanfu Temple (Wuyi County) =

Buddhist temple in Zhejiang, China

- 延福寺
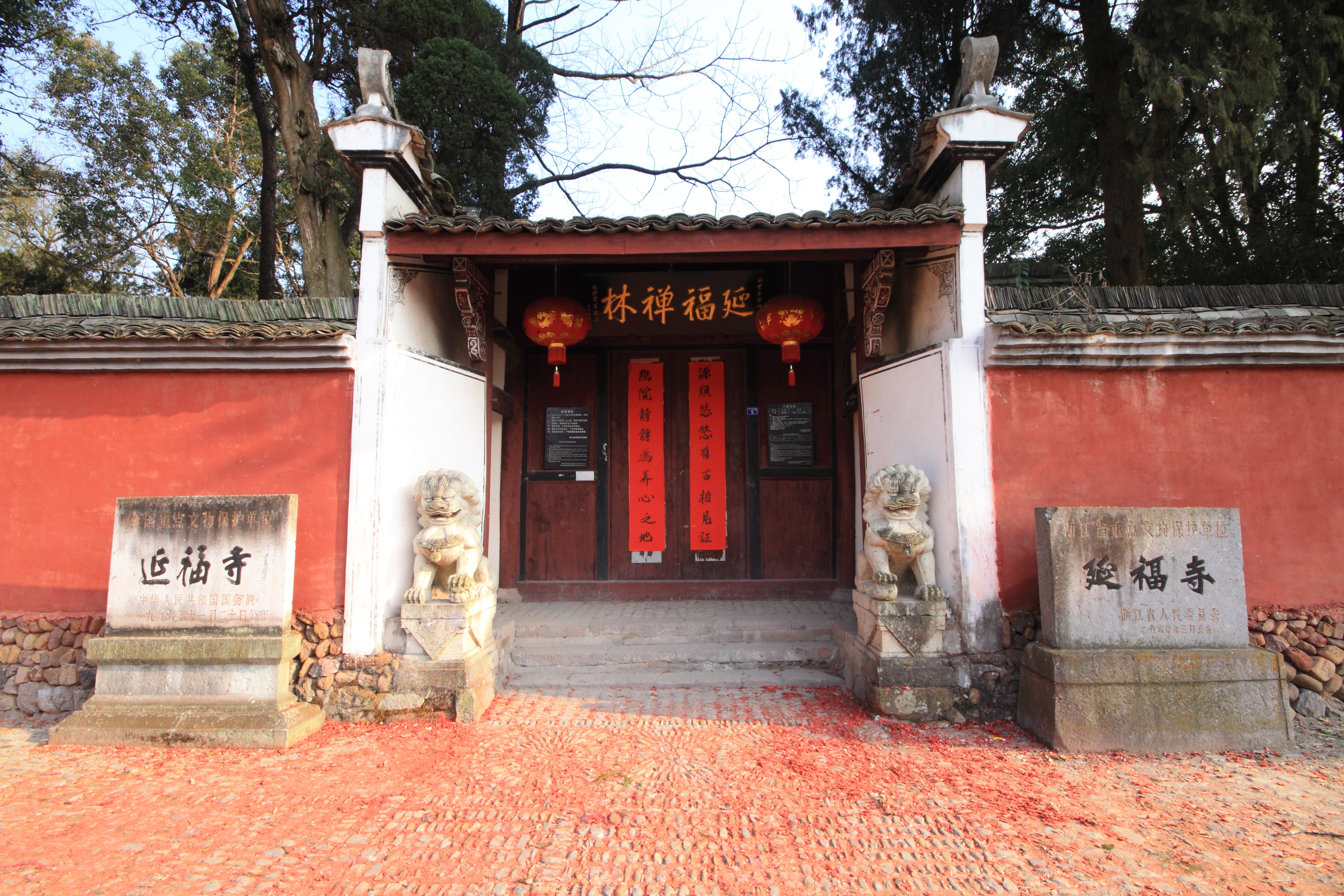
- The Shanmen at Yanfu Temple.

- Location within Zhejiang

Religion
- Affiliation: Buddhism
- Deity: Chan Buddhism

Location
- Location: Wuyi County, Zhejiang
- Country: China
- Coordinates: 28°42′43.92″N 119°36′06.84″E

Architecture
- Style: Chinese architecture
- Established: 937

Yanfu Temple or Yanfu Chan Temple (Chinese: 延福寺; pinyin: Yánfú Sì) is a Buddhist temple located in Wuyi County, Zhejiang, China. The Mahavira Hall is the earliest Yuan dynasty (1271–1368) architecture and one of the three Yuan dynasty wooden architecture in Jiangnan.

== History ==
The temple was originally built in 937 in the Later Jin dynasty (936–947) with the name of "Futian Temple" (福田寺) and was renamed "Yanfu Temple" (延福寺) by Emperor Guangzong in the Southern Song dynasty (1127–1279).

During the Republic of China, Liang Sicheng and Lin Huiyin investigated the temple and made a detailed record of the Mahavira Hall.

After the establishment of the Communist State, the temple was used as a pigsty.

Yanfu Temple was added to Zhejiang Provincial Cultural Heritage List in 1960. In November 1996, it was listed among the fourth group of "Major National Historical and Cultural Sites in Zhejiang" by the State Council of China.

A modern restoration of the entire temple complex was carried out at the end of 2014 and was completed in December 2016.

== Architecture ==
Along the central axis of the temple stand four buildings including the Shanmen, Hall of Four Heavenly Kings, Mahavira Hall and Hall of Guanyin. Subsidiary structures were built on both sides of the central axis including the Bell tower, Drum tower, and Free Life Pond.

=== Mahavira Hall ===
The Mahavira Hall was rebuilt in 1317, under the Yuan dynasty (1271–1368), it is the earliest Yuan dynasty architecture in Jiangnan. It is rectangular in shape and five rooms wide and has double-eaves gable and hip roofs. Inner walls are painted with paintings and calligraphies of the Ming dynasty (1368–1644).

== Gallery ==
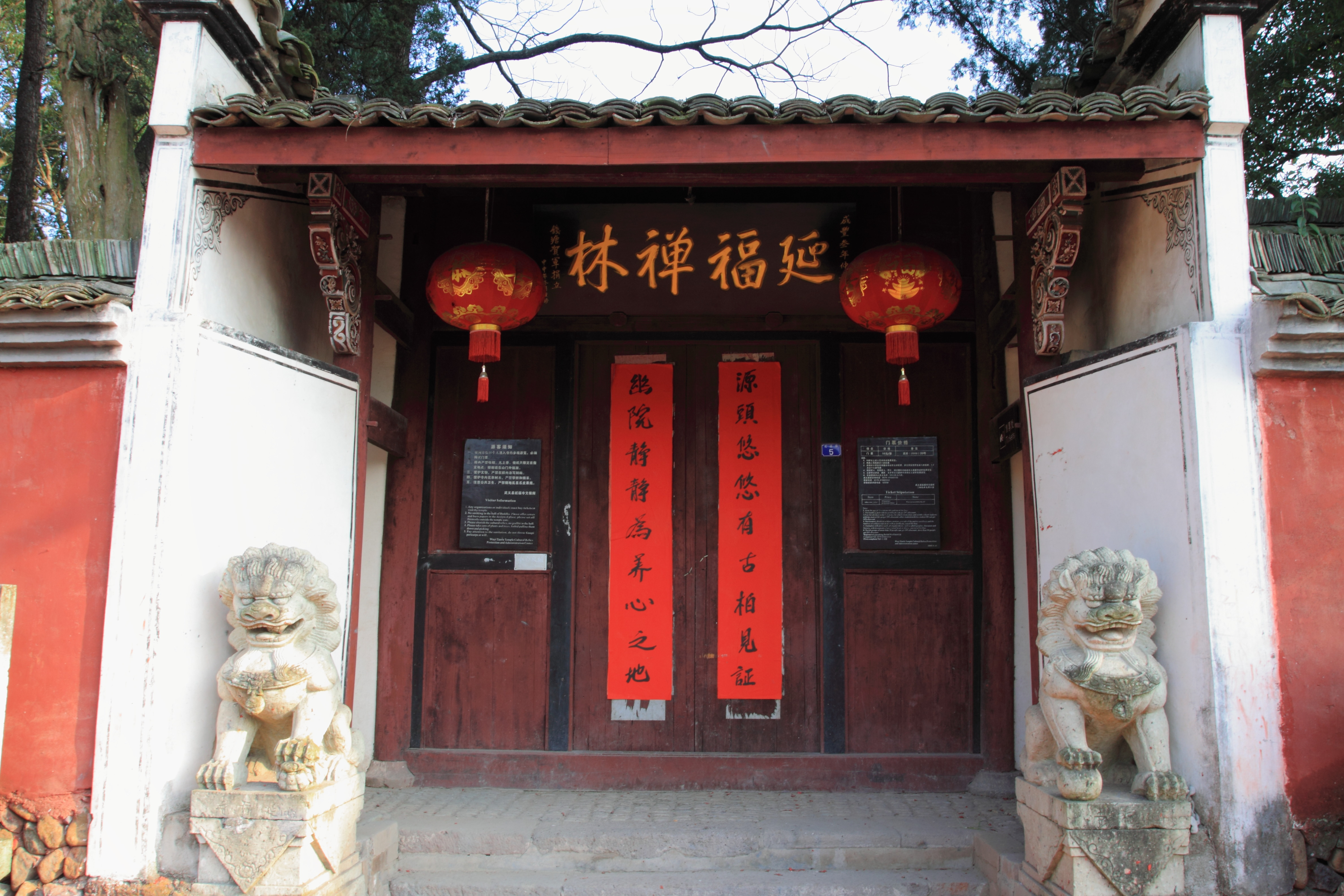
The Shanmen at Yanfu Temple.

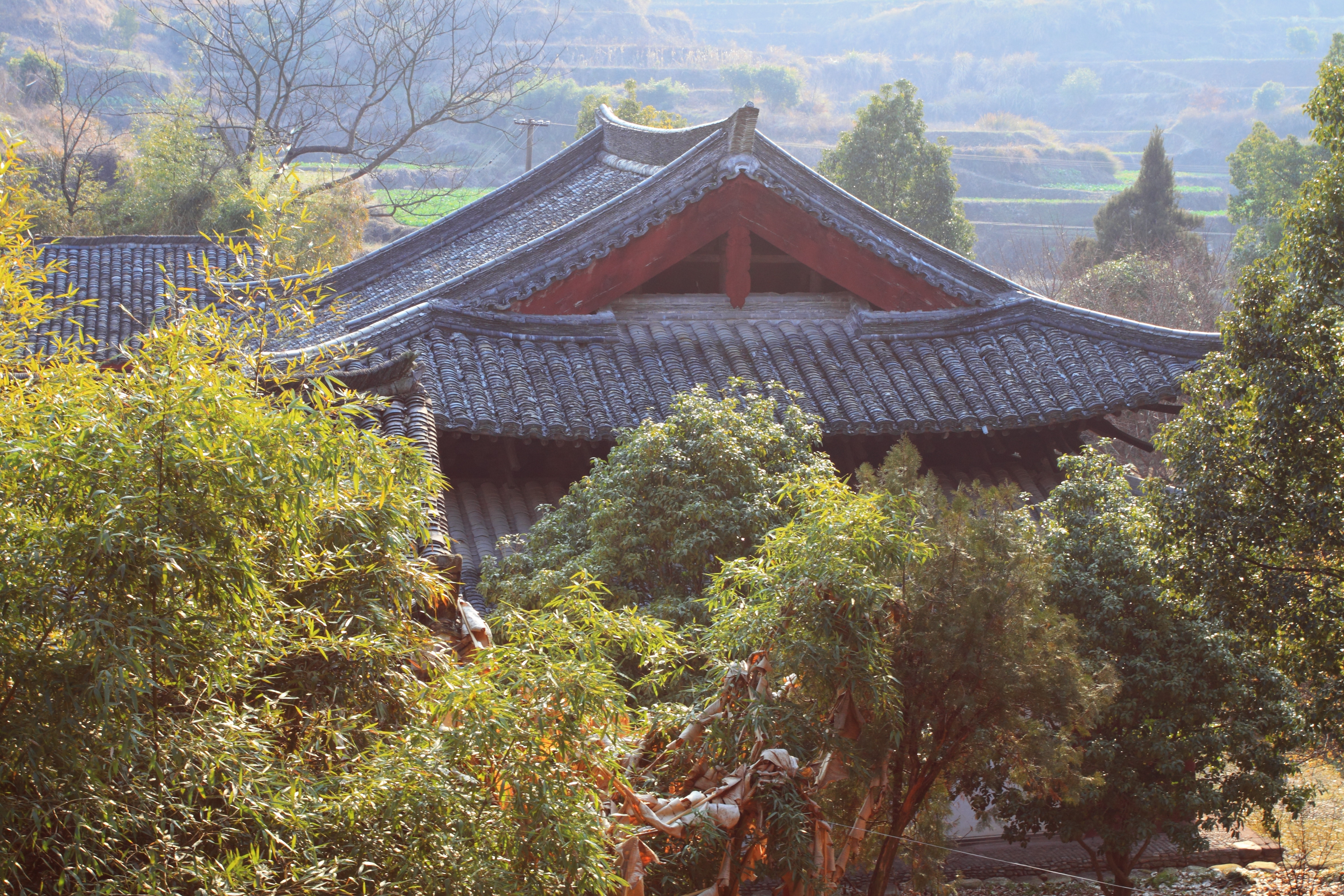
A command view of Yanfu Temple.

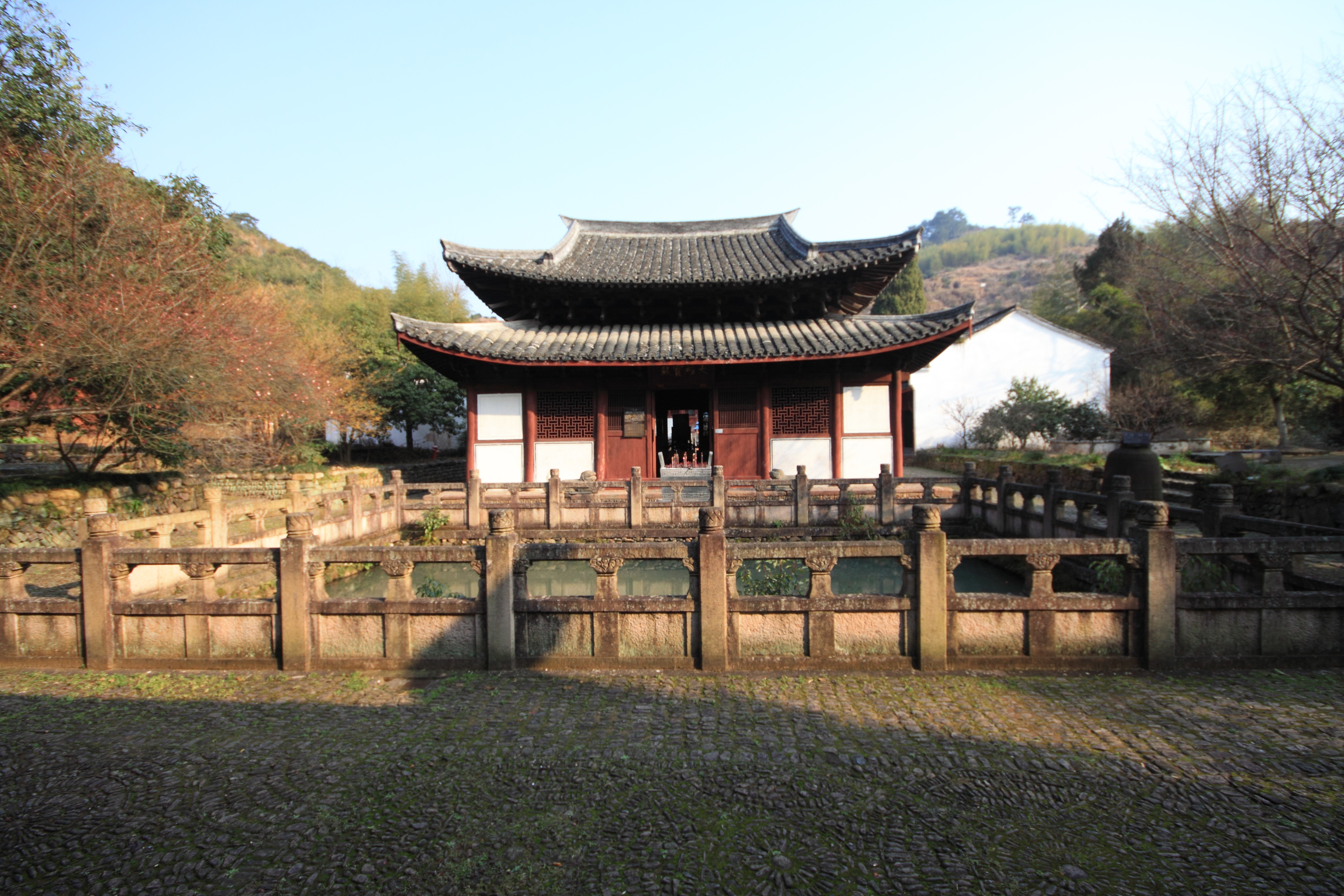
Mahavira Hall.

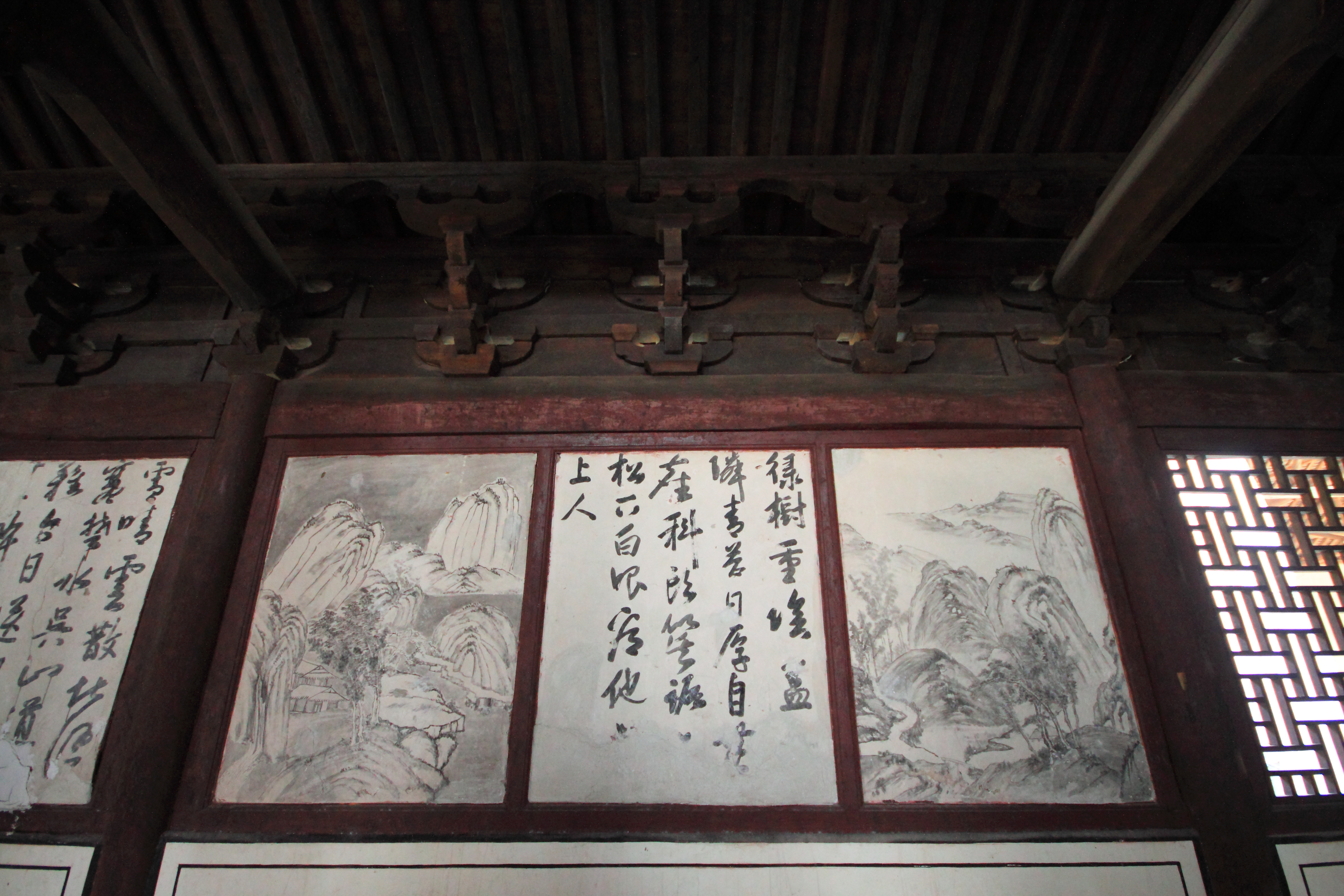
Paintings and calligraphies on the inner walls of the Mahavira Hall.

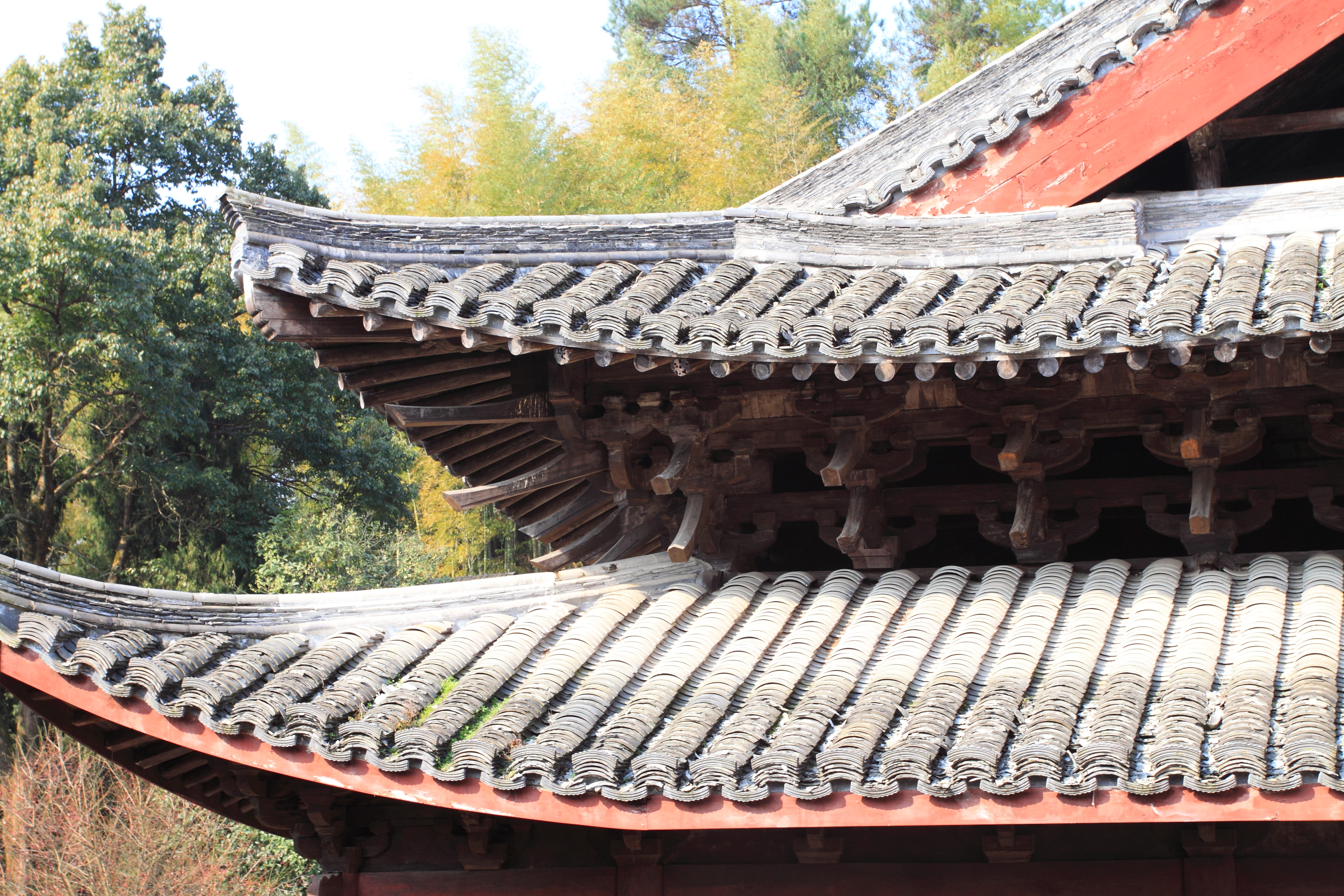
Eaves of the Mahavira Hall.

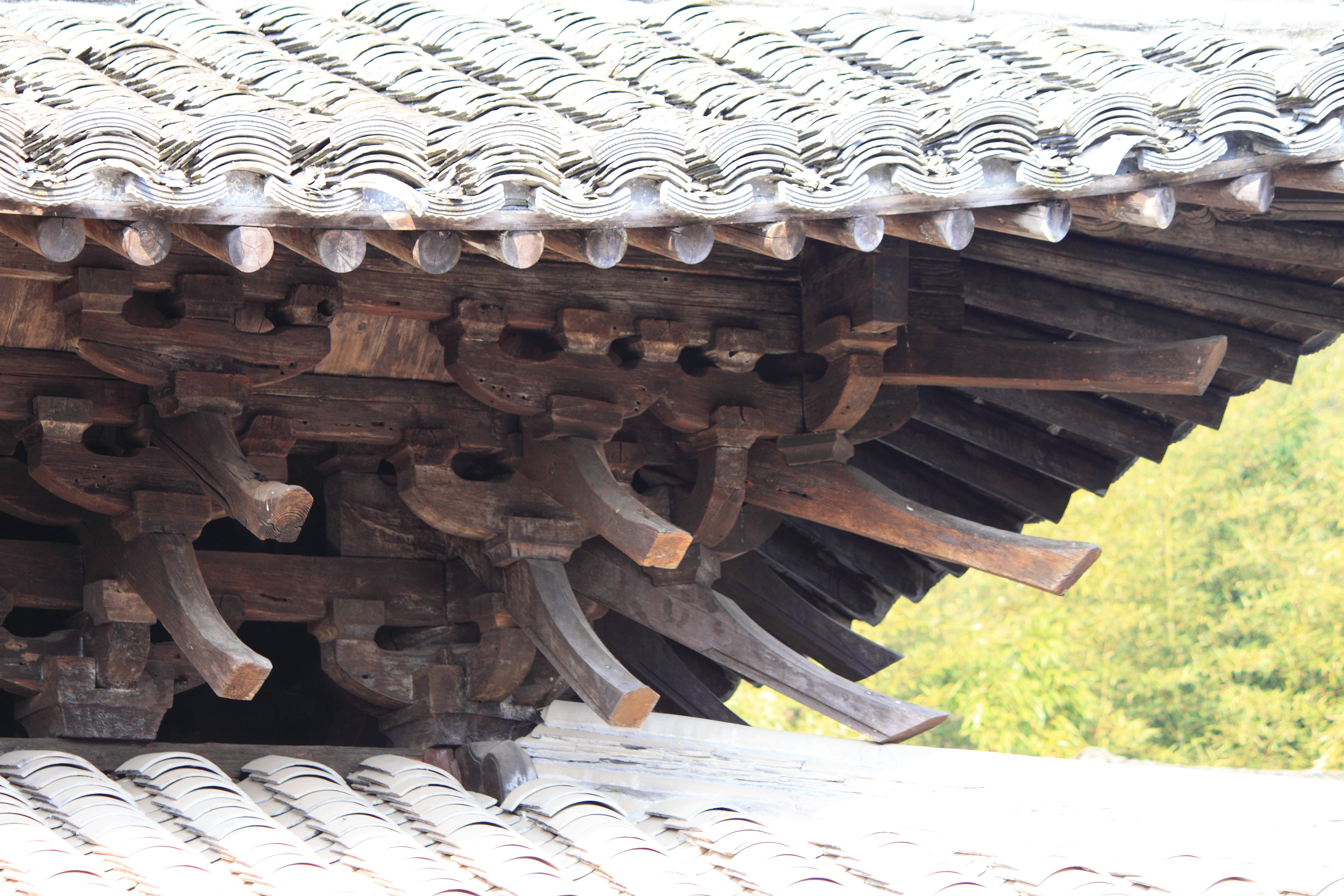
Eaves.
