= Athens of the West =

Athens of the West may refer to:

- Angers, Maine-et-Loire, France
- Cincinnati, Ohio
- Faribault, Minnesota
- Jacksonville, Illinois
- Lexington, Kentucky
- Old Pasadena, in Pasadena, California
- Carmarthen, in Wales, United Kingdom
- Athens, Georgia
- Sacramento

== See also ==
- West Athens (disambiguation)
- Athens of the North, … South
- Paris of the East, … South, … West
- Rome of the West, Second Rome, Third Rome
