= Venice of the East =

The following is a list of places which have been nicknamed Venice of the East (a reference to the city of Venice, Italy).

== List ==
City/Town	Country	Photo	References
Bandar Seri Begawan (Kampong Ayer)	Brunei		
Barisal	Bangladesh		
Dhaka	Bangladesh		
Dalian	China		
Fengjing	China		
Lijiang	China		
Luzhi	China		
Nanxun	China		
Suzhou	China		
Tongli	China		
Xitang	China		
Zhouzhuang	China		
Zhujiajiao	China		
Wuzhen	China		
Tai O	Hong Kong		
Alleppey	India		
Srinagar	India		
Udaipur	India		
Banjarmasin	Indonesia		
Palembang	Indonesia		
Semarang	Indonesia		
Basra	Iraq		
Hiroshima	Japan		
Imizu	Japan		
Ine	Japan		
Kurashiki	Japan		
Kyoto	Japan		
Matsue	Japan		
Otaru	Japan		
Osaka	Japan		
Sakai	Japan		
Tamayu, Shimane (Tamatsukuri Onsen)	Japan		
Yanagawa	Japan		
Malacca	Malaysia		
Nan Madol	Micronesia		
Manila	Philippines		
Sitangkai, Tawi-Tawi	Philippines		
Cheongna	South Korea		
Chuncheon	South Korea		
Jinhae	South Korea		
Tongyeong	South Korea		
YeoSu	South Korea		
Ayutthaya	Thailand		
Bangkok	Thailand		

== Similar ==
- Kampong Phluk
- Ko Panyi

== See also ==
- Venezuela, country whose name means "Little Venice"
- Venice of the North
- Venice of the South
- Little Venice
- Paris of the East
- Paris of the North
- Paris of the West
- Little Paris
