= Venice of the North =

List of settlements nicknamed Venice of the North

The following is a list of settlements nicknamed Venice of the North.

The term Venice of the North refers to various cities in Northern Europe that contain canals, comparing them to Venice, Italy, which is renowned for its canals, such as the Grand Canal. Some of these nicknames, e.g. in the case of Amsterdam, date back centuries, while others like Birmingham are recently given and invented as self-promotion by the cities' own residents or representatives.

== List ==
City/Town	Country	Photo	References
Ålesund	Norway		
Amiens	France		
Amsterdam	Netherlands		
Arendal	Norway		
Bamberg	Germany		
Birmingham	United Kingdom		
Bourton-on-the-Water	United Kingdom		
Bruges	Belgium		
Bulandet and Værlandet	Norway		
Bydgoszcz	Poland		
Colmar	France		
Cork	Ireland		
Copenhagen	Denmark		
Emden	Germany		
Friedrichstadt	Germany		
Gdańsk	Poland		
Giethoorn	Netherlands		
Glasgow-Maryhill	United Kingdom		
Haapsalu	Estonia		
Hamburg	Germany		
Henningsvær	Norway		
Kalisz	Poland		
Leeds	United Kingdom		
London-Paddington	United Kingdom		
Lübeck	Germany		
Manchester	United Kingdom		
Papenburg	Germany		
Passau	Germany		
Rochdale	United Kingdom		
Saint Petersburg	Russia		
Schwerin	Germany		
Skipton	United Kingdom		
Stockholm	Sweden		
Stralsund	Germany		
Strasbourg	France		
Svolvær	Norway		
Wolfenbüttel	Germany		
Wrocław	Poland		

== See also ==
- Monasterevin, Irish town nicknamed "Venice of Ireland"
- Venezuela, country whose name means "Little Venice"
- Venice of the East
- Venice of the South
- Little Venice
- Paris of the East
- Paris of the North
- Paris of the West
- Little Paris
