= Athens of the North =

Athens of the North may refer to one of several cities in Northern Europe that, due to their prominence in science and culture, were likened to Classical Athens:

- A nickname for Edinburgh, Scotland, see: Etymology of Edinburgh
- A nickname for Huddersfield, England
- A nickname for Jyväskylä, Finland, and especially the University of Jyväskylä
- The motto of King's Cove, Newfoundland and Labrador, Canada
- A nickname for Liège, Belgium, especially during the Prince-Bishopric of Liège
- A nickname for Stockholm, Sweden, especially in the time of Christina, Queen of Sweden
- A nickname for Valenciennes, France
- A nickname for Vilnius, Lithuania
- A nickname for the 18th-century Warrington Academy, in England

== See also ==
- North Athens (regional unit), an administrative division in Athens, Greece
- Athens of Africa
- Athens of the West, … South
- Paris of the East, … South, … West
- Rome of the West, Second Rome, Third Rome
