= Paris of the Orient =

Paris of the Orient may refer to:

- Hanoi
- Harbin
- Saigon
- Manila
- Shanghai

== See also ==
- Paris of the East
