= Shen Wansan =

Chinese businessman (1330–1379)

- Born: Shen Fu; 1330; Suzhou, Jiangsu Province
- Died: 1379

Shen Wansan (Chinese: 沈万三) was a businessman during the beginning of Ming Dynasty.

== Achievements ==
Shen used to be one of the richest men at the area south of the Yangtze river by doing foreign commerce and he took the most advantage of the convenient waterway in Suzhou. After he became rich, he made Suzhou the important place to do his business. Shen lived in the period of the end of Yuan Dynasty and the beginning of the Ming Dynasty. At the beginning of the Ming Dynasty, the Hongwu Emperor chose Nanjing as the capital. Shen helped to build one third of the wall of the capital.

== Experience ==
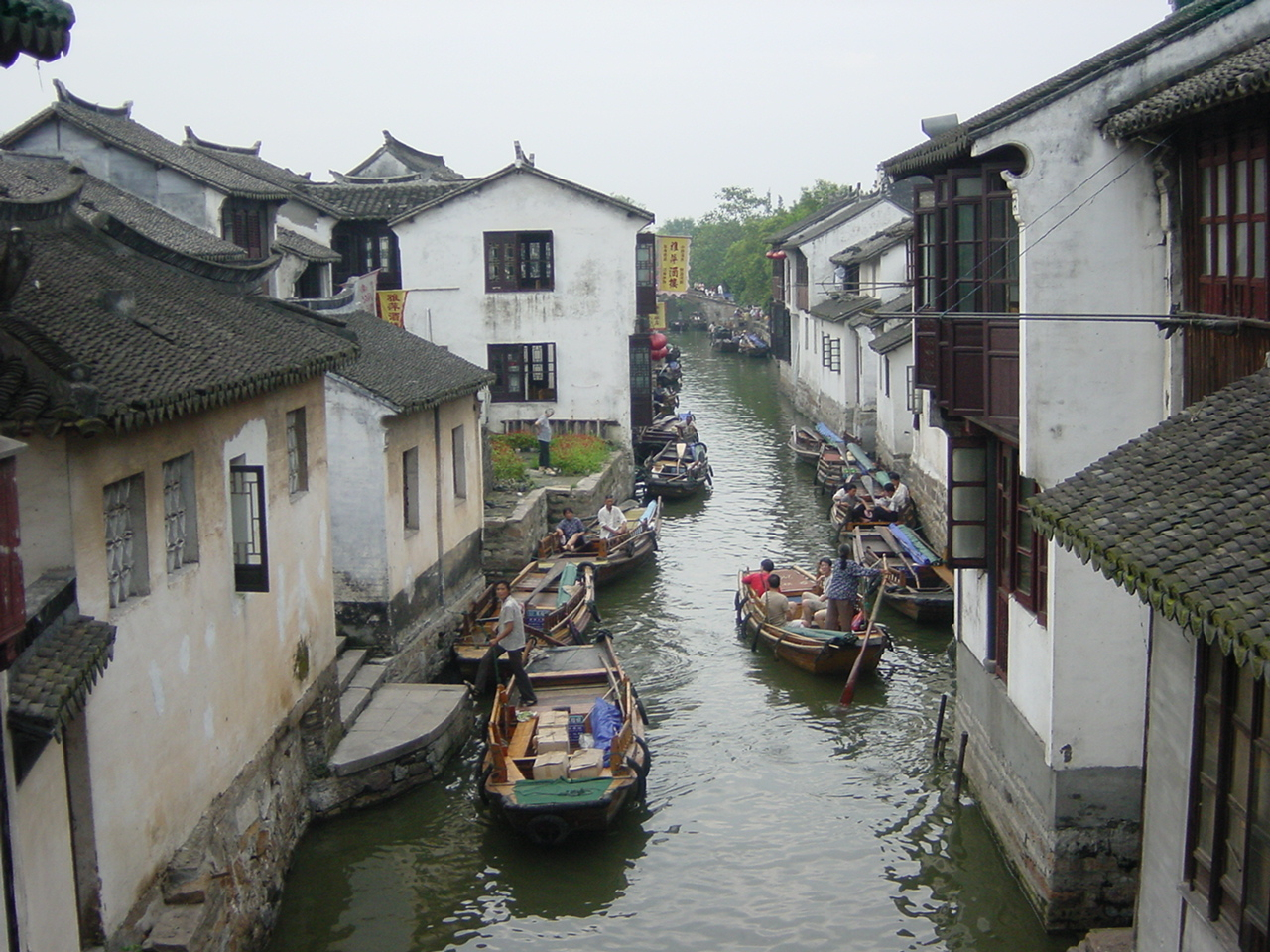
Zhouzhuang.

Shen had been to Zhouzhuang, Suzhou, Nanjing, Yunnan and many other places. Shen always considered Zhouzhuang as the place where his career started. "The residence of Shen is in the north-west of the town which has storehouse, garden and pavilion along the Yinze river""the magnificent house of Shen is still in Zhouzhuang" But the Hongwu Emperor, Zhu Yuanzhang, was envious of his property and concerned about the threat posed by this wealthy man. Shen was finally exiled to Yunnan and spent the rest of his life there. The people liked Shen very much and they preferred to believe that Shen would never die and became immortal. In the Qing Dynasty, someone still claimed that he met ageless Shen in Yunnan.

== How Shen made a fortune ==
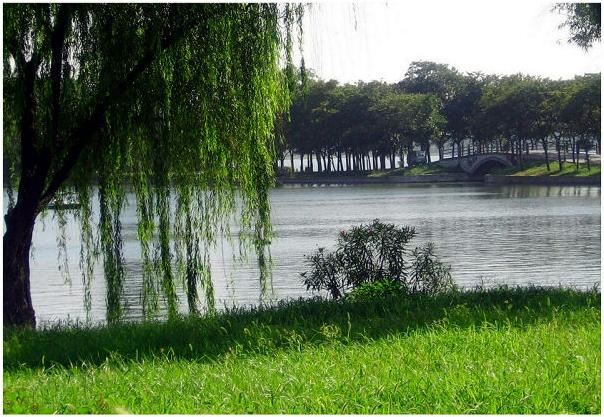
Xuanwu lake.

He started his career with farming in Zhouzhuang. Zhouzhuang has a warm climate and easy irrigation which is suitable for farming. Shen followed his father here and made money through agriculture. "Shen liked buying land and houses to grow wealth." There was a rich man called Lu Deyuan in Suzhou. He appreciated the talents of Shen and trusted him. He passed large amounts of money to Shen. With the help of Lu, Shen had more ability to create more money. "Shen Wansan has the fortune passed by a man named Lu, who was one of the richest men in this area." Shen developed a farming, as well as silk and tea business. As water transport was quite convenient in Zhouzhuang, he exported tea, silk, china, food, imported jewels, ivory items, and spices. In this way, he accumulated great wealth. The story goes that Shen had a treasure trove so great that it could not be counted. He helped to build the walls of Nanjing and other facilities with this money. It is said that the very large Xuanwu Lake formed his rear garden.

== Ancient Tea Route ==
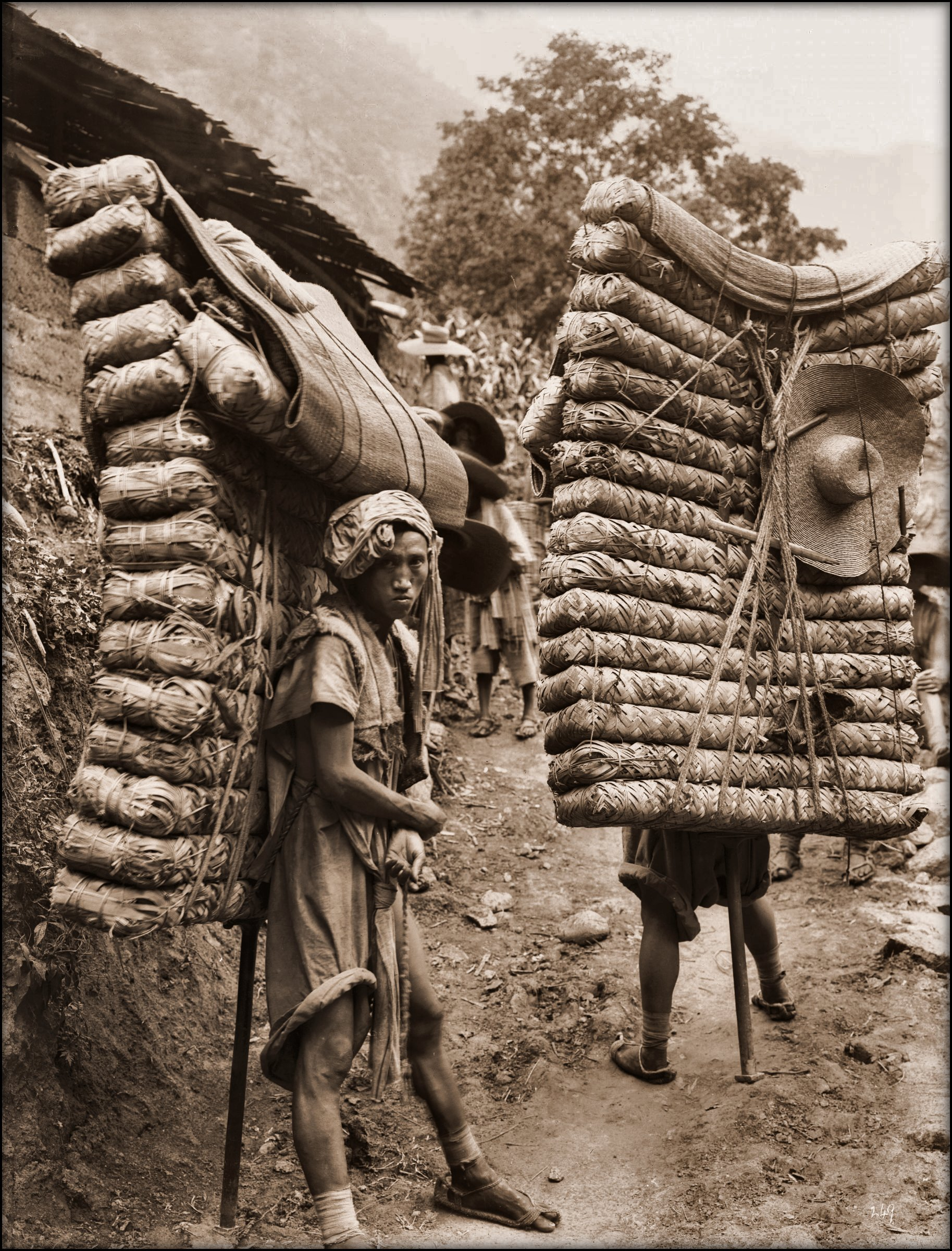
Men Laden With Tea, Sichuan Sheng, China; Ernest H. Wilson (1908).

After he was exiled to Yunnan, many of Shen's friends went to visit him. They found a new route to earn money: they could transport tea, china, and handcrafts, among other things, to the North-western area and Tibet. The route is now called ancient tea route. Although the weather there was cold and the passes were rough and rugged, Shen thought it had potential to be developed. With his experience and commercial initiative, he transported the typical products from south of the river to Tibet, India, Burma and more.

== Historic evaluation ==
Among all the historic events, the story of Zhu Yuanzhang and Shen Wansan is the only one which is about the battle between a great politician and a great businessman. The imperial power above everything won the battle inevitably.
