= Retreat & Reflection Garden =

The Retreat & Reflection Garden
UNESCO World Heritage Site
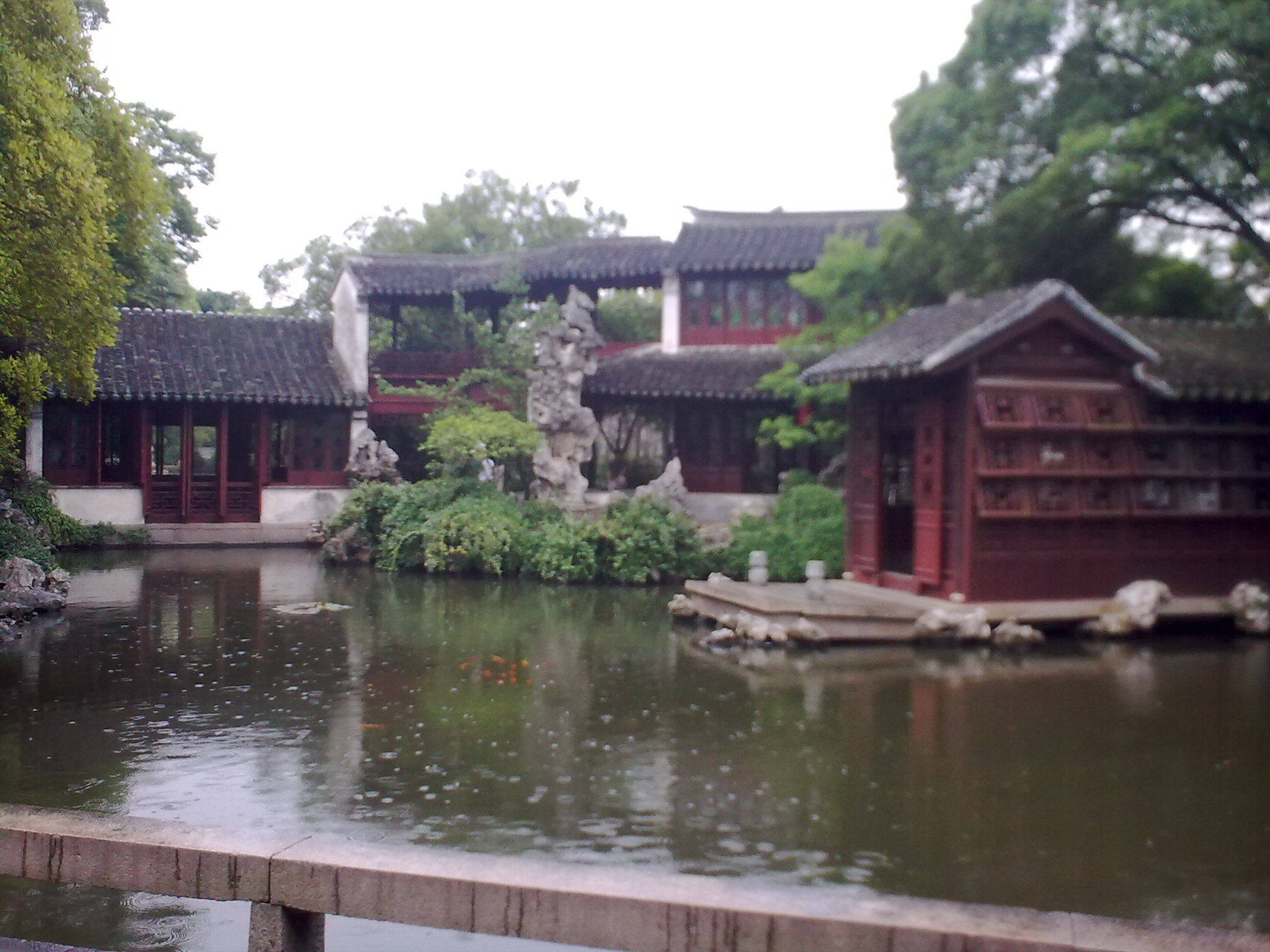
- The Retreat & Reflection Garden

- Location within Jiangsu Location within China
- Location: Suzhou, Jiangsu, China
- Part of: Classical Gardens of Suzhou
- Criteria: Cultural: (i)(ii)(iii)(iv)(v)
- Reference: 813bis-009
- Inscription: 1997 (21st Session)
- Extensions: 2000
- Area: 0.421 ha (1.04 acres)
- Buffer zone: 1.531 ha (3.78 acres)
- Coordinates: 31°9′35.5″N 120°42′55.4″E

The Retreat & Reflection Garden (Chinese: 退思园; pinyin: Tuìsī Yuán; Suzhou Wu, Wugniu: the^{5} sy^{1} yoe^{2}, Wu Chinese pronunciation: [tʰe̞ sz̩ ɦyø]) is a notable classical garden in China. It is located in Tongli, Wujiang, Jiangsu, China. In 2001, it was recognized with the other Classical Gardens of Suzhou as a UNESCO World Heritage Site.

== History ==
The garden was built in 1885 by Ren Lansheng, an imperial official working in Anhui province who was impeached. The name of the garden comes from a verse by Zho Zhuan in Zhuo Qiuming's Chronicles, "Lin Fu really is a gentleman when he forwards proposals, he shows loyalty to his country, when he retreats he reflects and mends his ways". The garden was designed by Yuan Long (袁龙), a painter of the Wumen school.

== Design ==
The 6,600 square metres (71,000 sq ft) garden is divided into an eastern residential area, a western main garden court with two minor courtyards attached to it. The design of this garden is innovative in that is uses an east–west axis as the main axis as opposed to the traditional north–south axis. The layout of buildings around the pool in the main courtyard uses the near-the-water style of placing the buildings back from the waters edge and keeping the water level high. This part of the garden is named: "The Garden Floating on Water."

Garden Design Elements with Description
East Garden
Gathering Beauty Tower A tower attached to the wall of the East Garden, without a first level. It is hexagonal and has a roofline with flying eves tapering to a single point.
Entry Gate Entry Gate on street in Tongli
Entry Hall Entry Hall and courtyard
Guesthouse A six bay hall with full gable roofline and portico facing into Reception Courtyard. The hall is sited opposite the Lasting Spring and Moon Viewing Tower.
Land Boat A boat hall opposite the Leisure Snatching Round Gate used for music performances. It has a front portico with hipped gable roofline and flying eves.
Lasting Spring and Moon Viewing Tower A two-story six bay structure with front portico facing into the Reception Courtyard on both levels and a roofline. This building has stairs which access the Tower of Gathering Beauty.
Reception Courtyard Courtyard which functions as the antechamber of the East Garden section, which is connected by the Leisure Snatching Round Gate. The courtyard is planted with several specimen trees.
Wan Xiang Hall Named after the pseudnym, Wang Xiang used By Ren Langsheng. it is a formed by a north and south two story five bays tower joined by a galleries to form a larger U-shaped structure around a contained courtyard. This was the primary residential quarters of the family. Both halls have a portico which faces into the courtyard. The roofline is.
West Garden
A Secular Boat A boat building on the pond.
Celestial Bridge An elevated covered corridor that connects the Soft Rain Brings Coolness Terrace and Hardship Tower. It is accessed by a cloud stairway at the Soft Rain Brings Coolness Terrace. This building complex and scholar stone is considered to be one of the famous scenes of Suzhou gardens.
Hardship Tower A three bay two level tower with portico on the first level and a full gable flat eve roofline.
Lotus Blossoms Pavilion A square attached pavilion with hipped gable roofline and flying eves. It is sited on piers in the pool.
Music Terrace A three bay hall with full gables and flat eves.
Osmanthus Hall A three bay hall with portico and full gables with flat eves which anchors the minor courtyard. Named for the grove of Osmanthus fragrans trees located there.
Sleeping Cloud Pavilion A square pavilion built atop a rockery with a grotto room underneath it. It is accessed by a cloud stairway built into the rockery. It has a hipped gable flying eve roofline
Soft Rain Brings Coolness Terrace A three bay hall with full gable roofline and flat eves. A horse head wall on one side of the structure attaches to the celestial bridge and cloud stairway.
The Pond The Pond in the West Garden.
Thatched Hall of Retreat and Reflection The main hall of the west garden. A three bay hall with hipped gable roofline and flying eves. A stone terrace at the front of the building affords a panoramic view of the garden. The views constructed to be seen from this vantage point simulate an unrolling landscape scroll painting.

== See also ==
- Chinese garden
- Suzhou
