= Tongli =

Town in Jiangsu, China

Coordinates: 31°9′35.00″N 120°42′54.00″E

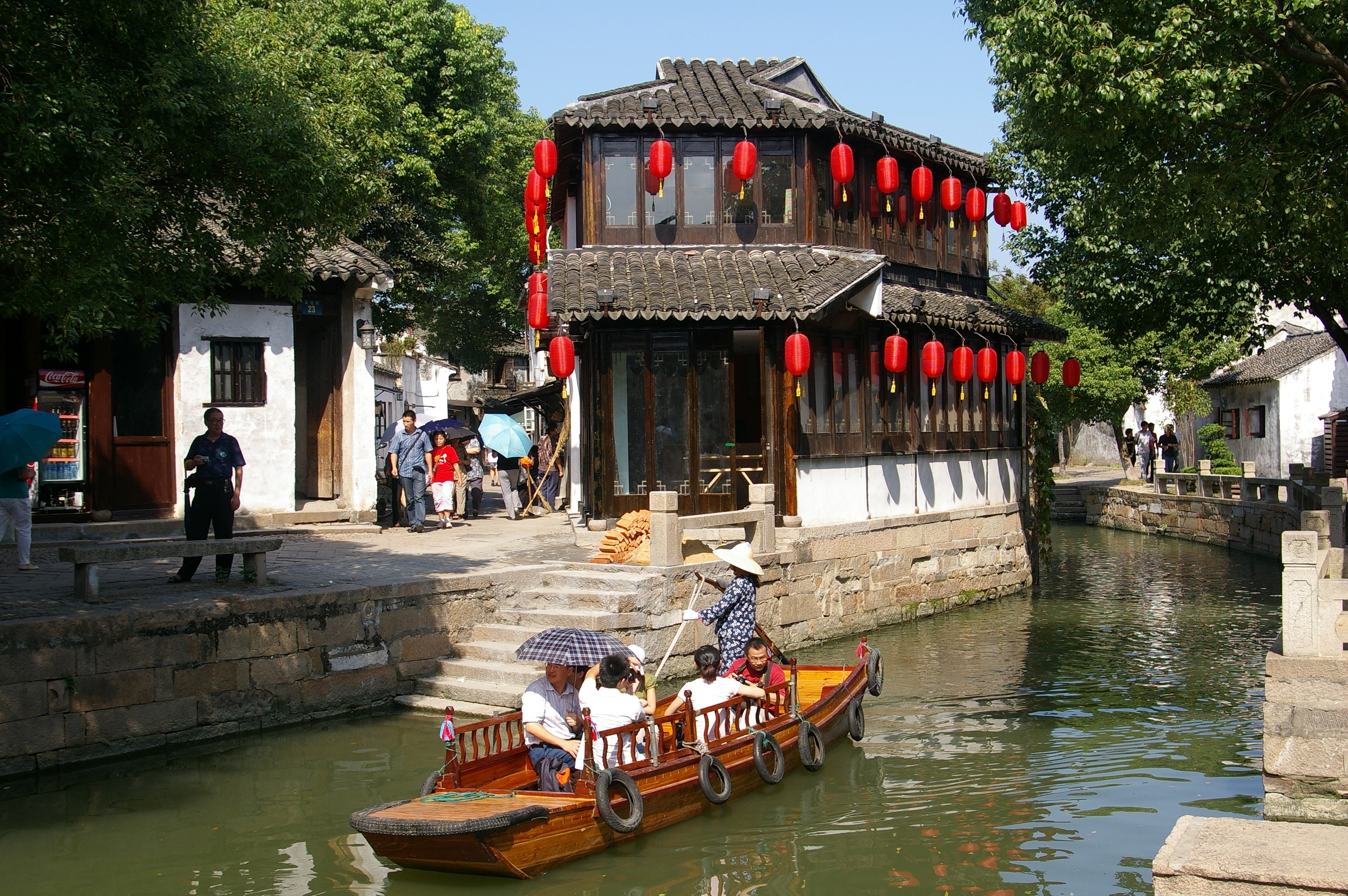
Tongli

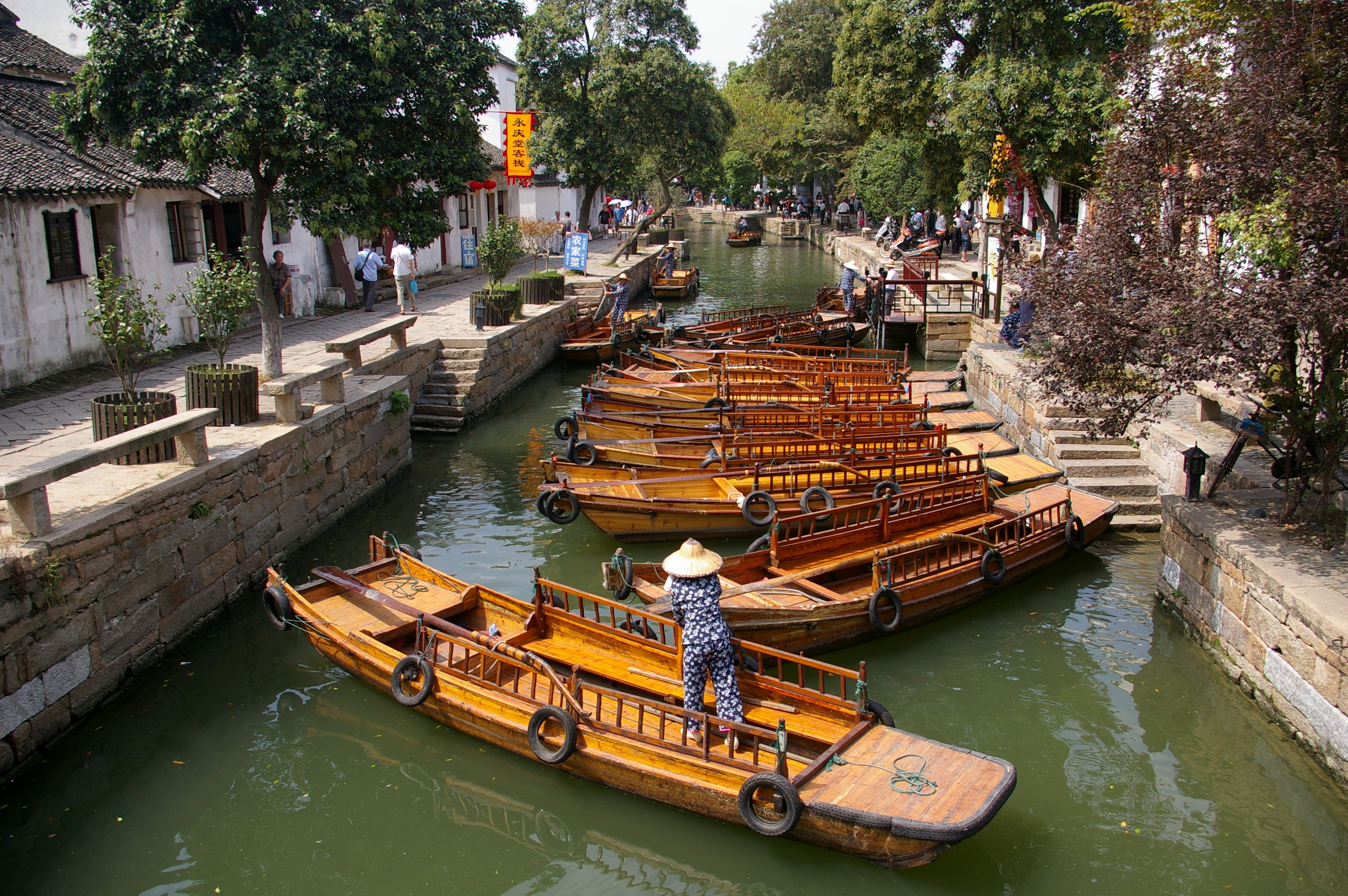
Canals

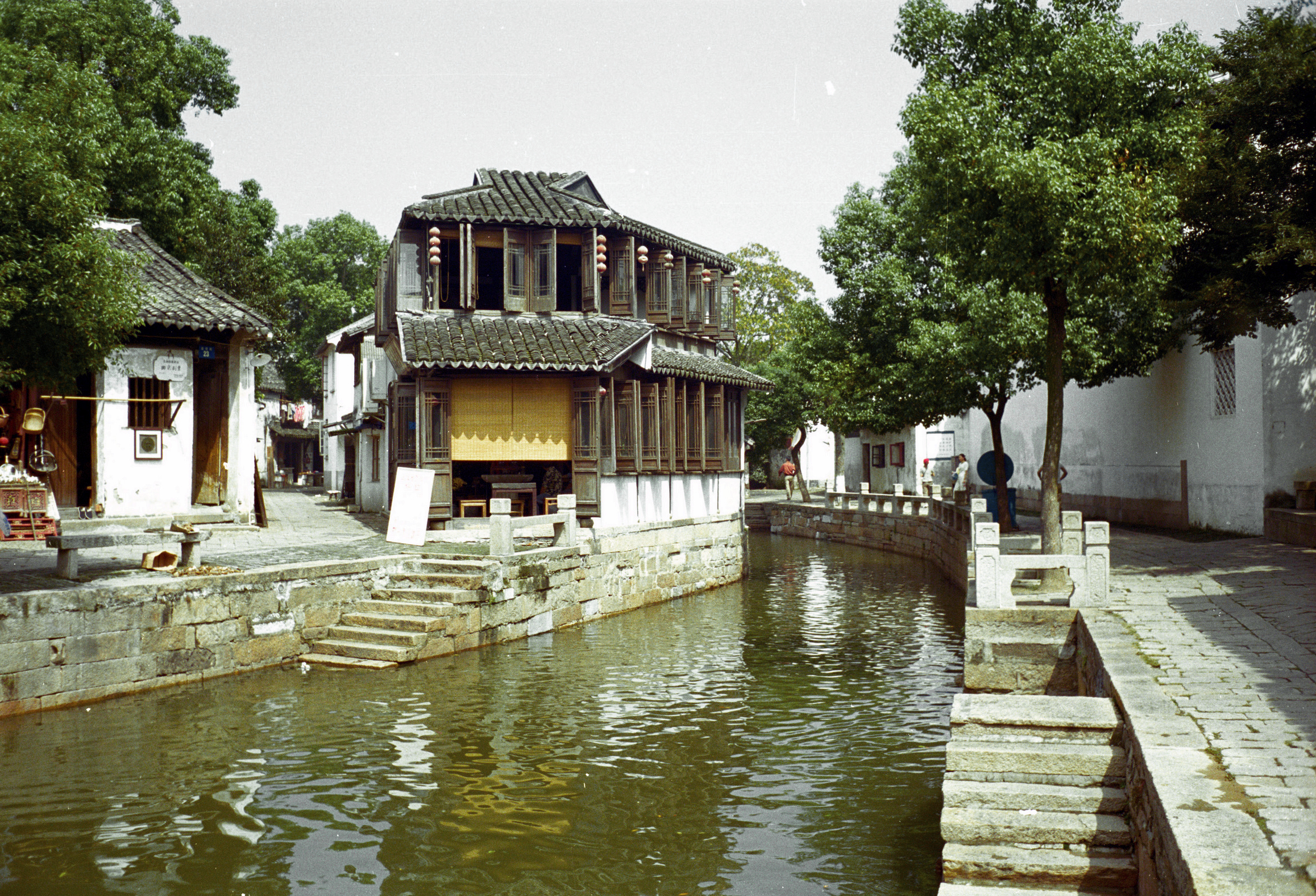
Tea houses

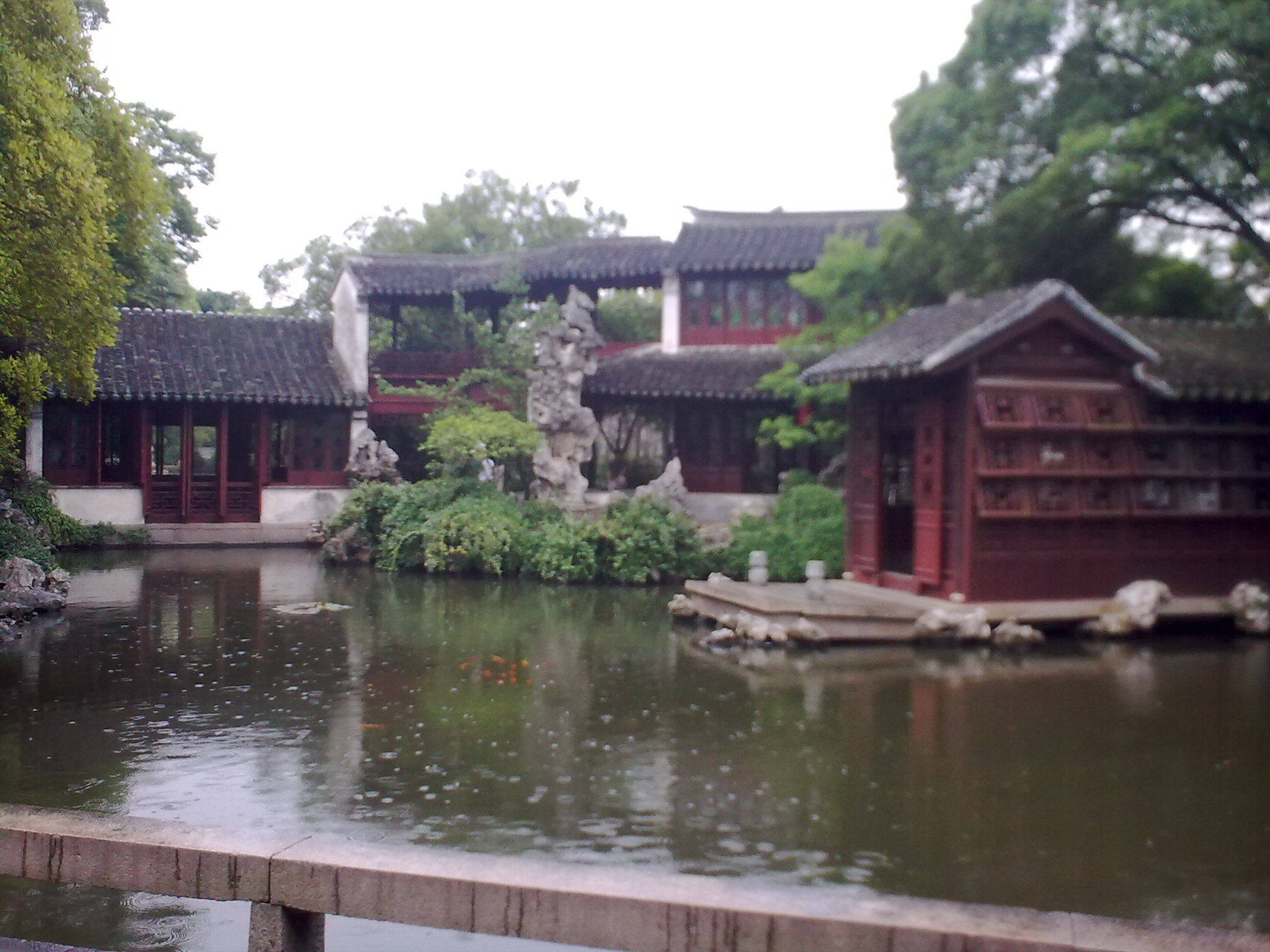
Retreat & Reflection Garden

Tongli, alternately Tong-Li (Chinese: 同里; pinyin: Tónglǐ; Wu, Wugniu: Don^{2} li^{6}, Wu Chinese pronunciation: [doŋ li]) is a town in Wujiang district, on the outskirts of Suzhou, Jiangsu province. It is known for a system of canals, it has been given the nickname "Venice of the East". The place retains many of the features of an ancient Wu provincial town.

Tongli is half an hour away from Suzhou city and about two hours from Shanghai by buses. The town is also accessible by Suzhou Metro (Line 4).

== Attractions ==
=== The Retreat & Reflection Garden ===
One of the most notable attractions is the Retreat & Reflection Garden (退思园). It was designed by the artist Yuanlong for Ren Lansheng and built in 1885–1887. In 2001, the Retreat & Reflection Garden was recognized with other classical Suzhou gardens as a UNESCO World Heritage Site.

=== Luoxing Zhou ===
It is an island on the lake. There are Buddhism, Taoism and Confucianism in this place. Its scenery is very beautiful. During the Spring Festival, people will go there to strike the bell to pray.

=== The Pearl Tower ===
It is a not real tower and it is just a model made up of pearls. Also, it's the name of a famous drama. It is in this place that the moving story between Fangqin and Chen Cui’e happened. Fangqin's father was banished by the court. So he came to his aunt to ask for help, but when his aunt heard of the bad news of Fang's she despised the poor and refused to help him. But his cousin was very kind and gave the Pearl Tower secretly to Fangqin. So latterly, Fangqin became the Zhuangyuan.

=== Three Bridges ===
There are 55 bridges in the town of Tongli. The most famous are the three bridges. They are Taiping, Jili, and Changqing Bridges. They all represent blessing. When getting married, the birth of a child, celebrating birthday, people will walk across the three bridges to pray for the health and happiness.

=== Other information ===
- Jiayin Hall is also of note, and is the former home of Liu Yazi, an early 20th-century actor known for his collection of gauze caps.

== See also ==
- Retreat & Reflection Garden
