= Zhouzhuang =

Zhouzhuang 周庄
- Town
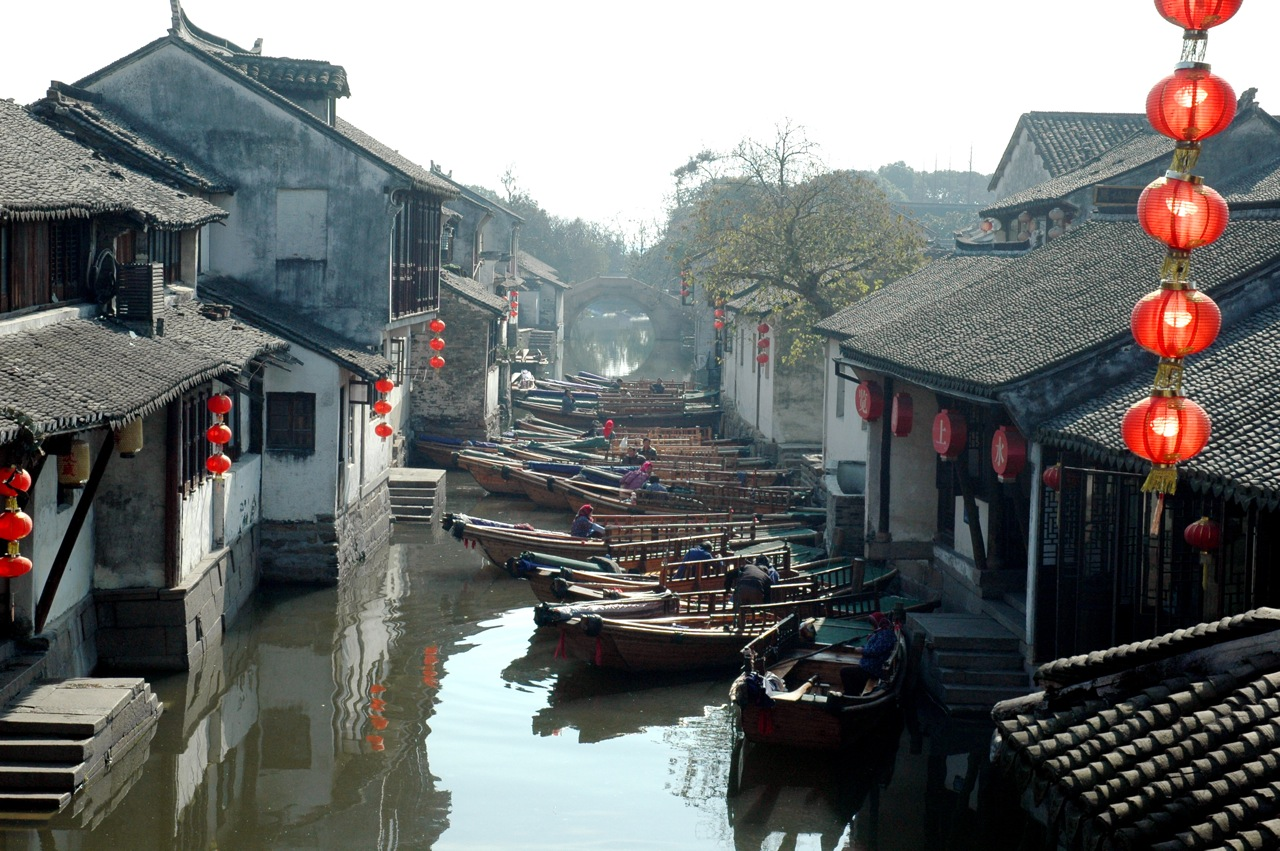
- Town of Zhouzhuang
- Interactive map of Zhouzhuang
- Coordinates: 31°6′53″N 120°50′44″E
- Country: China
- Province: Jiangsu
- Prefecture: Suzhou

Area
  - Total: 39.09 km^{2} (15.09 sq mi)

Population (2010 census)
  - Total: 28,599
  - Density: 731.6/km^{2} (1,895/sq mi)
- Time zone: UTC+8 (China Standard)

Zhouzhuang
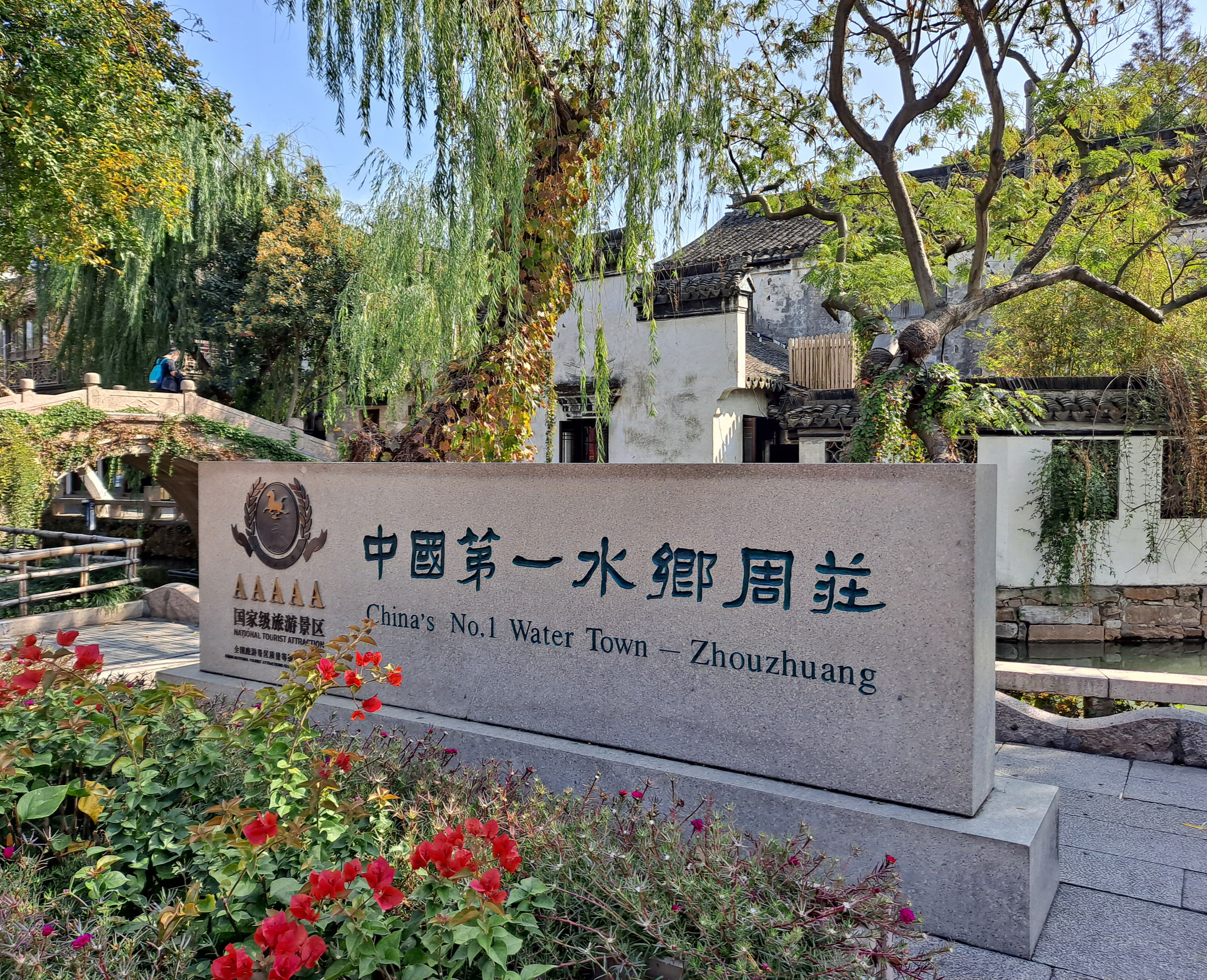
- Welcome sign promoting Zhouzhuang as "China's No. 1 Water Town"
- Chinese: 周庄
- Postal: Chowchwang
Transcriptions
Standard Mandarin
- Hanyu Pinyin: Zhōuzhuāng
- Wade–Giles: Chou^{1}-chuang^{1}
Wu
- Suzhounese: Tseu^{1}-tsaon^{1}

Zhouzhuang (Chinese: 周庄; pinyin: Zhōuzhuāng; Wu: Tseu^{1}-tsaon^{1}) is a water town known for its canals in Jiangsu province, China. It is located within the administrative area of Kunshan, 30 km southeast of the city centre of Suzhou.

Zhouzhuang is a popular tourist destination, classified as a AAAAA scenic area by the China National Tourism Administration. It is noted for its profound cultural background, well preserved ancient residential houses, and elegant watery views. A 2017 article in the Smithsonian Magazine described Zhouzhuang as "the most famous and most commercialized ancient water town in China," noting that its architecture "dates back more than 900 years, with about 60 original brick archways and 100 original courtyards." It has also been called "Venice of the East".

CNN ranked Zhouzhuang the third most beautiful water town in China in 2017 and included it in its 2019 collection of Asia's 13 most picturesque towns.

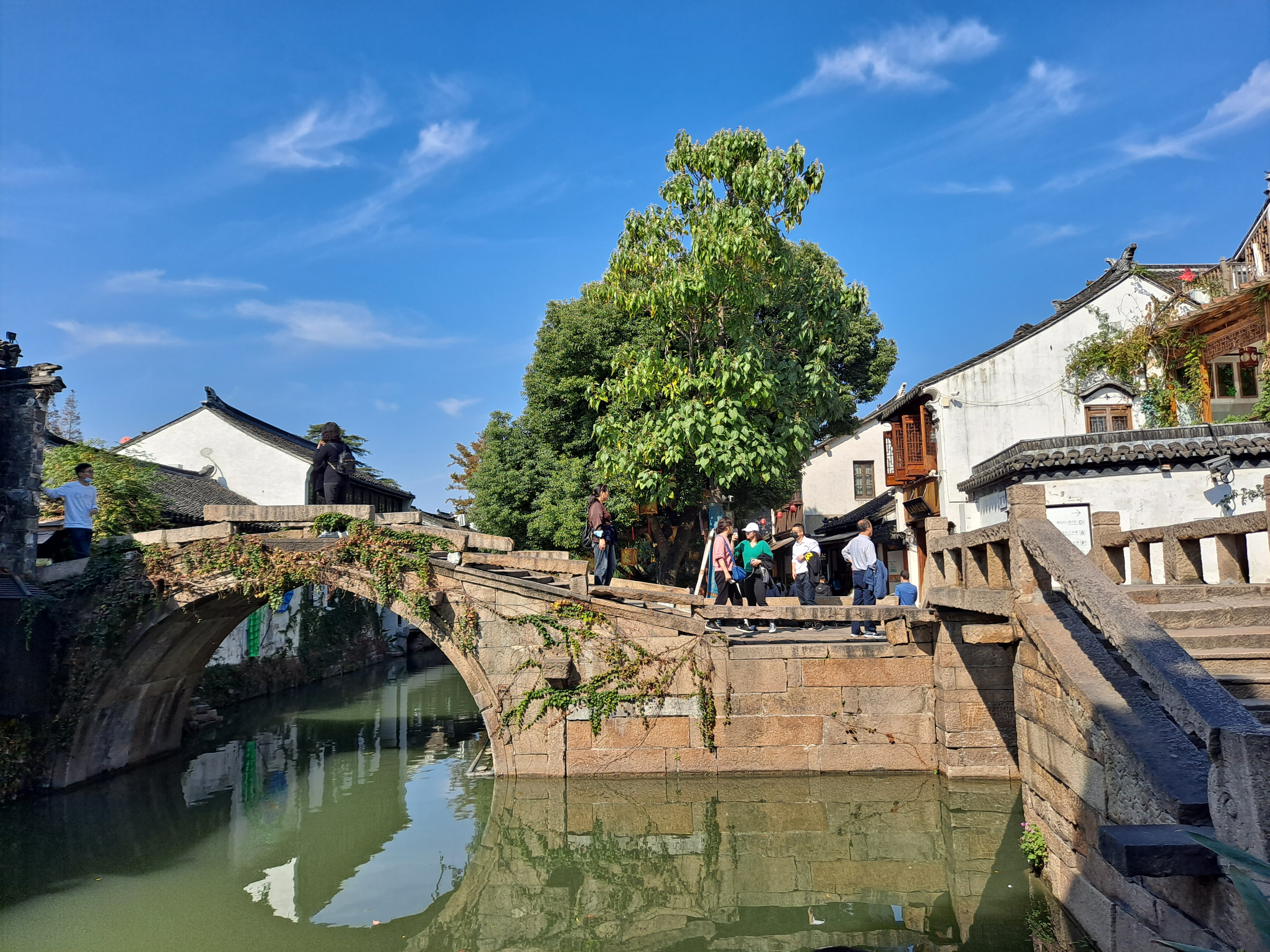
Double Bridges (Shuang Qiao)

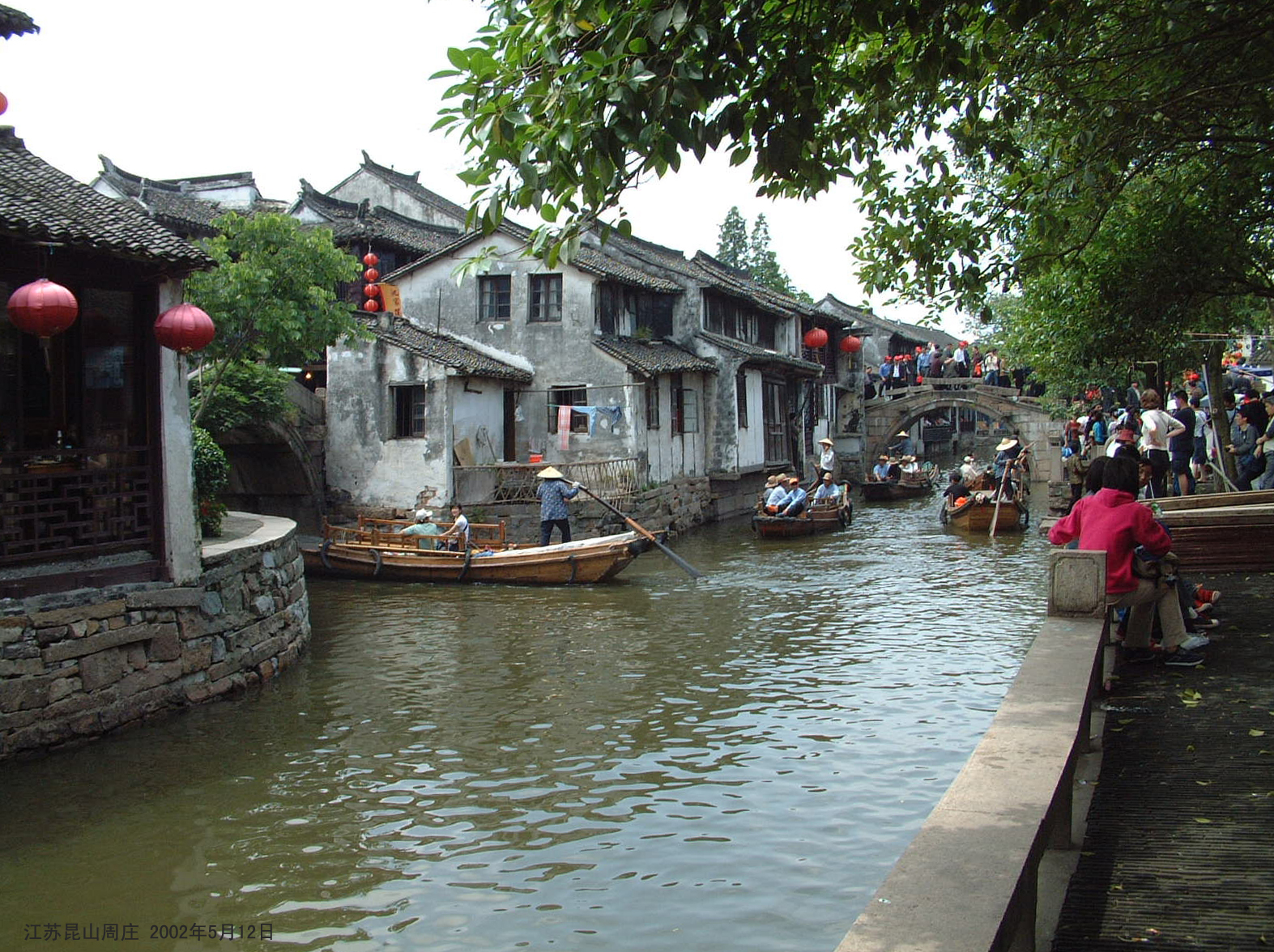
Double Bridges

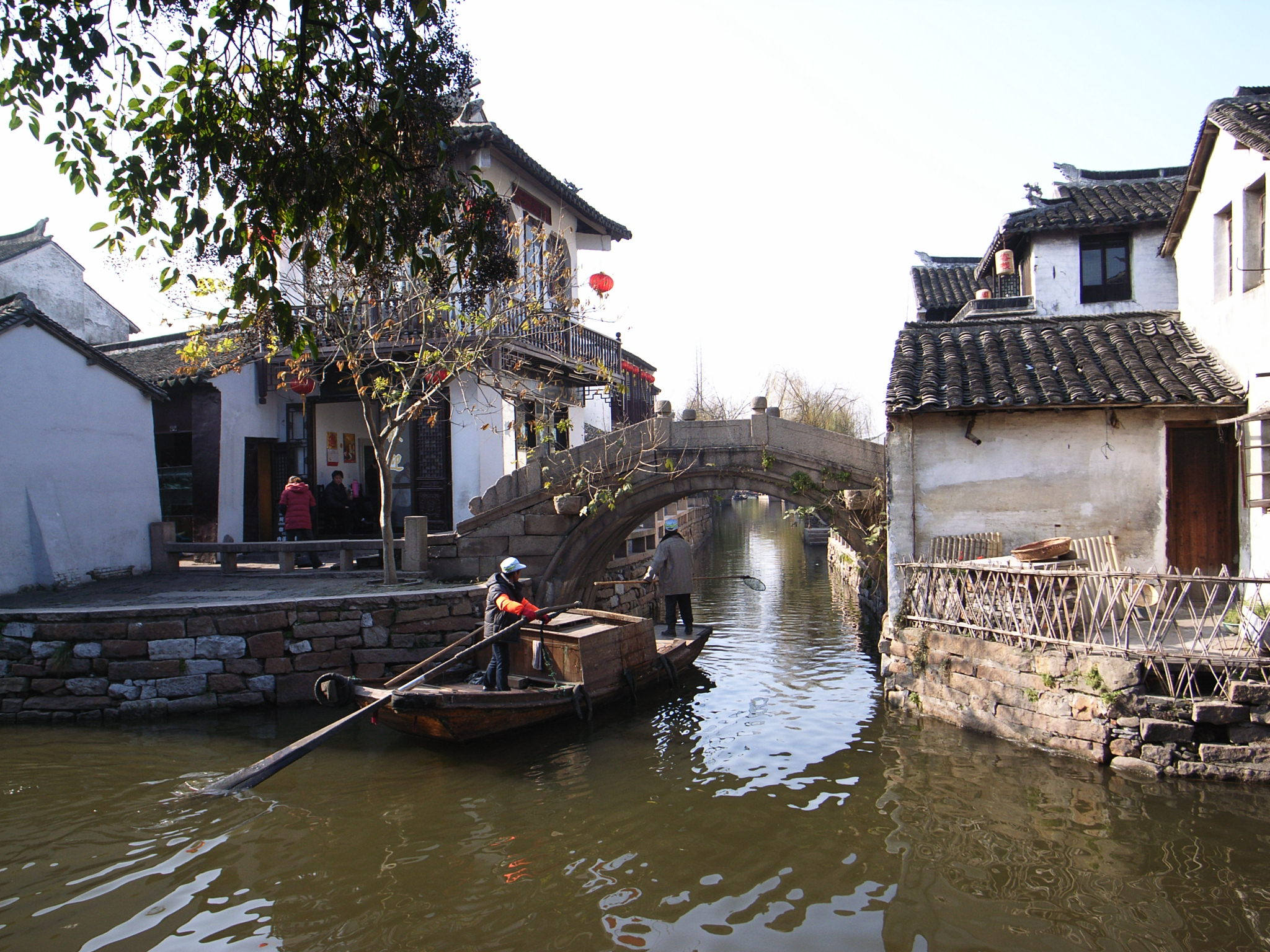
Boat in Zhouzhuang passing through canals

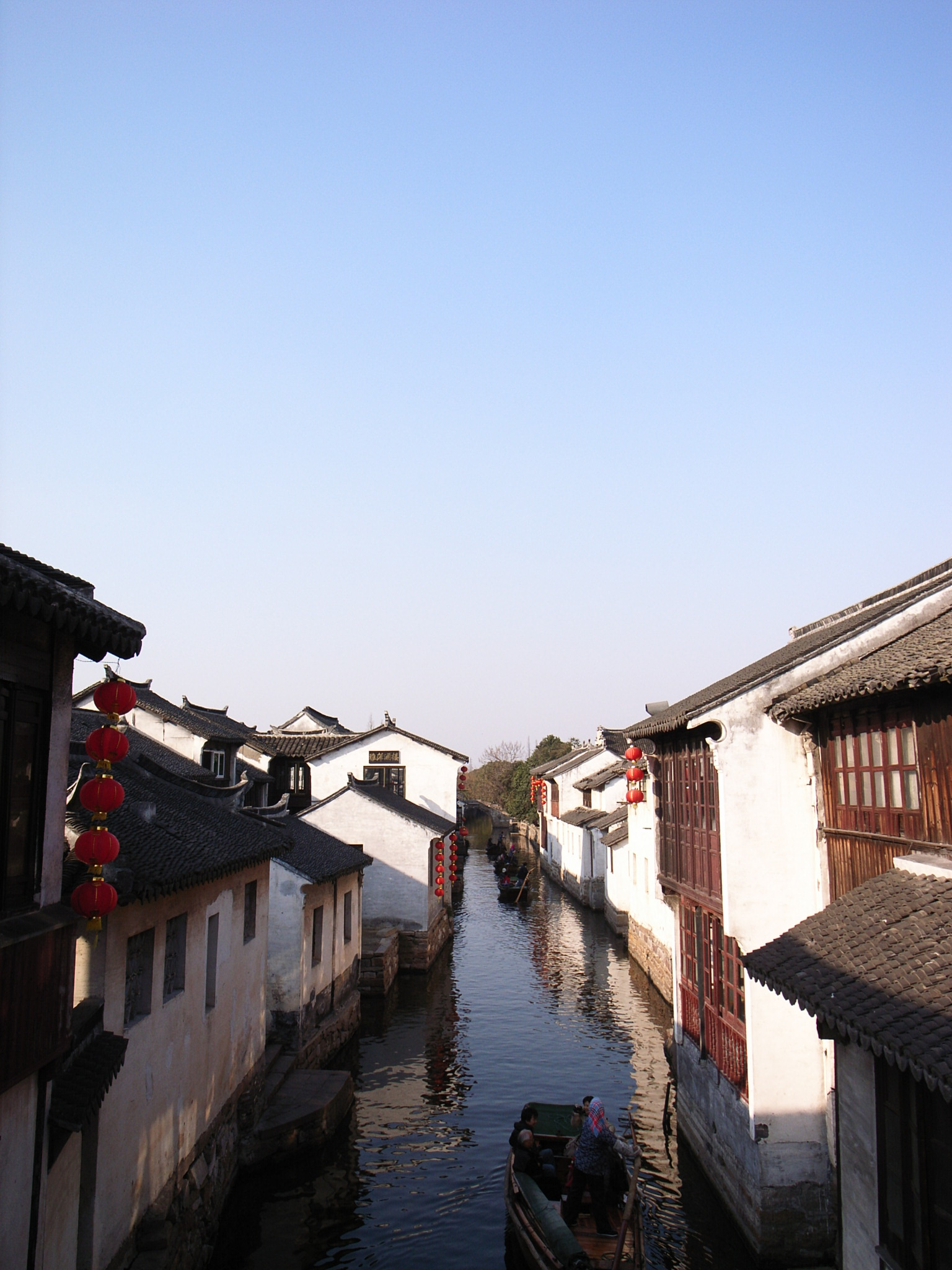
A canal in Zhouzhuang

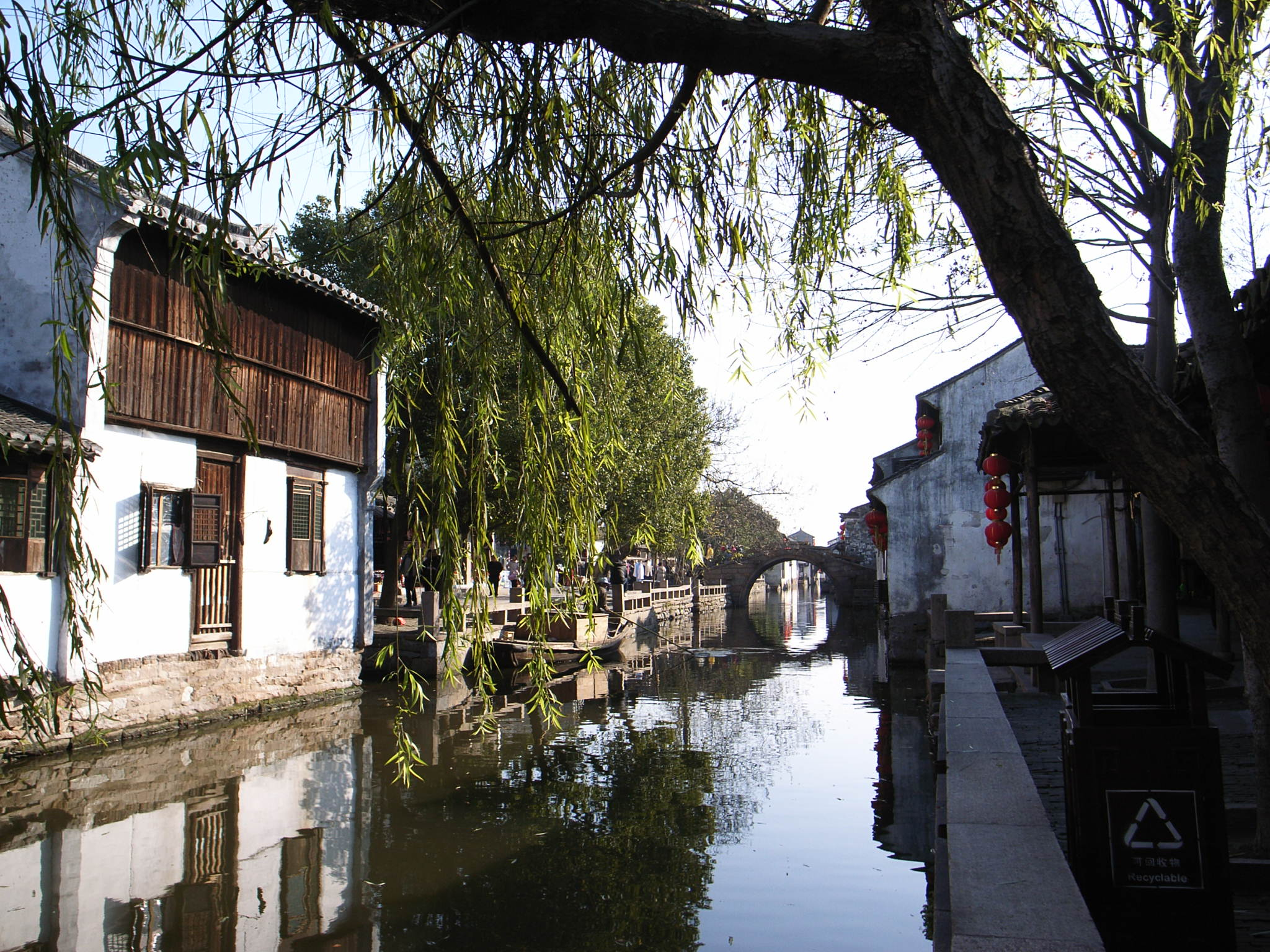

== History ==
In the Spring and Autumn period (770 BC–476 BC), Zhouzhuang was a part of the fief Yaocheng and called Zhenfengli. After being donated to Full Fortune (Quanfu) Temple by Zhou Digong, a devout Buddhist, in 1086 during the Northern Song dynasty (960–1127), Zhouzhuang obtained its present name.

== Sights ==
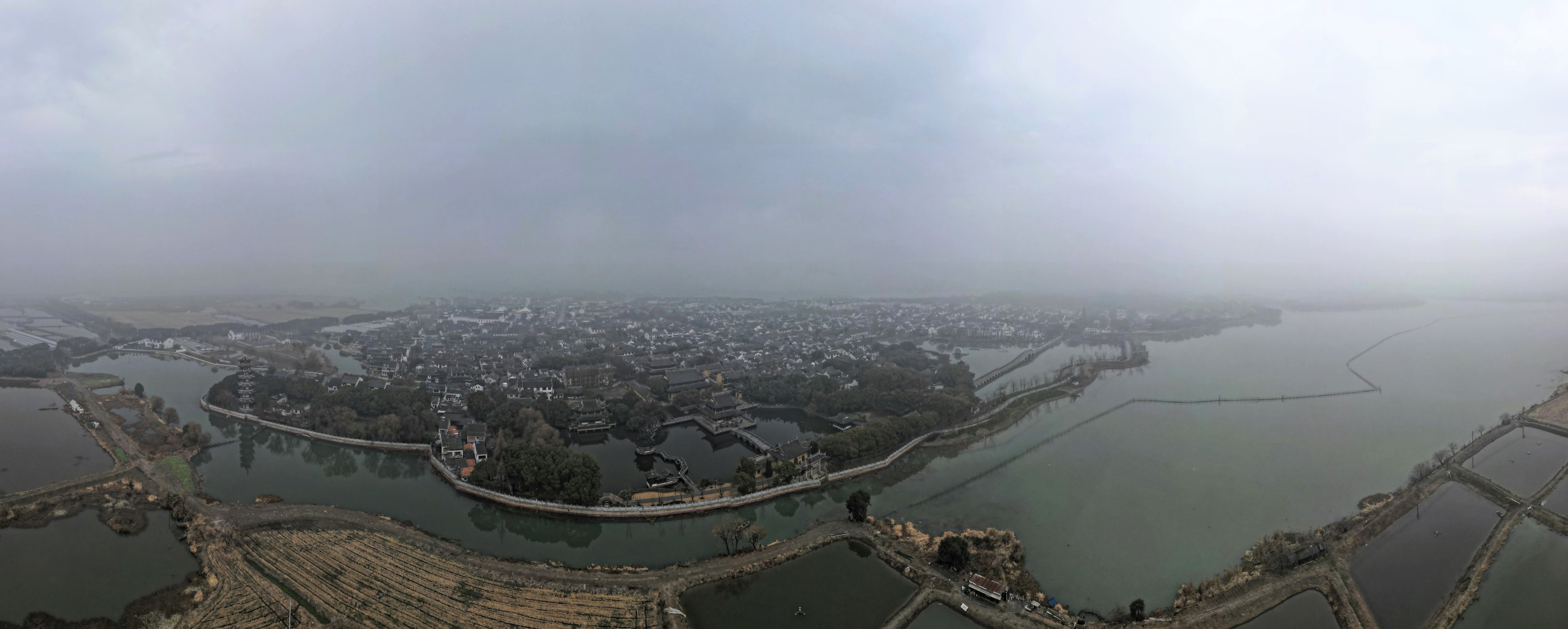
Aerial panorama of Zhouzhuang in Suzhou on a foggy winter's day. December 2023.

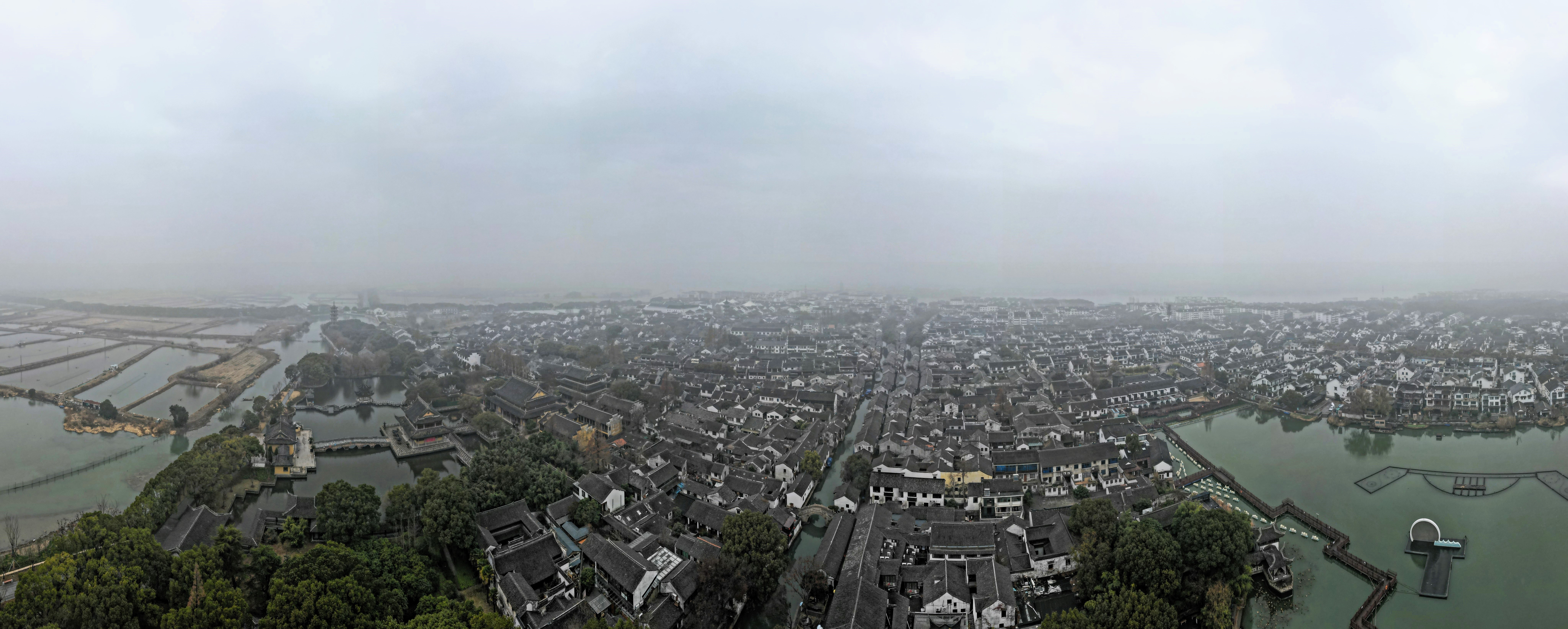
Aerial panorama of Zhouzhuang's canals from above. December 2023.

=== Double Bridges/Twin Bridges (Shuang Qiao) ===
Zhouzhuang is surrounded with and divided by lakes and rivers. Many stone bridges cross the rivers, showing distinctive views of the water town. The Double Bridges, which are Shide Bridge and Yongan Bridge, are the most famous and are considered the symbol of Zhouzhuang. Built in the Wanli era (1573–1619) of the Ming dynasty, the Double Bridges are located in the northeast of the town. Shide Bridge is east–west and has a round arch, while Yongan Bridge is north–south and has a square arch. Crossing the two crisscross rivers (Yinzi Creek and Nabeishi River) and connecting at the middle, the Twin Bridges look like an old-style Chinese key. In 1984, 38 canvases of the notable painter, Chen Yifei, were exhibited in a New York gallery of Armand Hammer, then chairman of Occidental Petroleum Corporation. "Memory of Hometown", also known as "Memory of My Homeland", which depicted the Double Bridges, was one of the items on display and attracted international attention.

=== Fuan Bridge ===
Located at the eastern end of Zhongshi Jie, Fuan Bridge was built in 1355 during the Yuan dynasty. The unique trait of the Fuan is the consummate combination of the single-arch bridge and the bridge towers.

=== Shenting House ===
Built in 1742 and located at the southeast side of Fuan Bridge, Shenting House was the private property of the descendant of Shen Wansan, the first millionaire of Jiangnan (South of Yangtze River) in the early Ming dynasty. The whole architectural complex is of the Qing's style and occupies an area of more than 2,000 square meters (half an acre). Over 100 rooms are divided into three sections and each one is connected by arcades and aisles. The first is the water gate and the wharf, where Shen's family moored boats and washed clothes. The middle part includes the gate tower, the tearoom and the main hall. Bricky gate tower carved with lively and ingenious figures which tell the historic stories or show the good wishes, make it a rare artwork. Tea room and main hall are places for serving guests, and the furnishings here are all very elegant. The last section is the two-storied dwelling which consists of several buildings which are quite different from the main hall, more comfortable and refined in pattern and atmosphere. The painted sculpture of legendary Shen Wansan is in Datang Tower; cultural relics including ancient folk instruments are exhibited in Xiaotang Tower and Back Hall.

=== Zhangting House ===
It was built by the descendants of Xu Kui in the Zhengtong era (1436–1449) of the Ming dynasty and bought by the Zhang family in the early Qing dynasty. Located to the south of the Double Bridges, Zhangting House has more than 70 rooms and takes up about 1,800 square meters (less than half an acre). With Ruojing River flowing through, Zhangting House is a dapper and graceful residential house with a tranquil courtyard and pond. Deep halls offer a peek into the lifestyle of the quondam owner.

=== Milou Tower ===
Once called the De's Tavern, Milou Tower perches next to Zhenfeng Bridge which is at the southwest corner of Zhouzhuang. It is famous for being a rallying place of the literators in old times.

=== Chengxu Temple ===
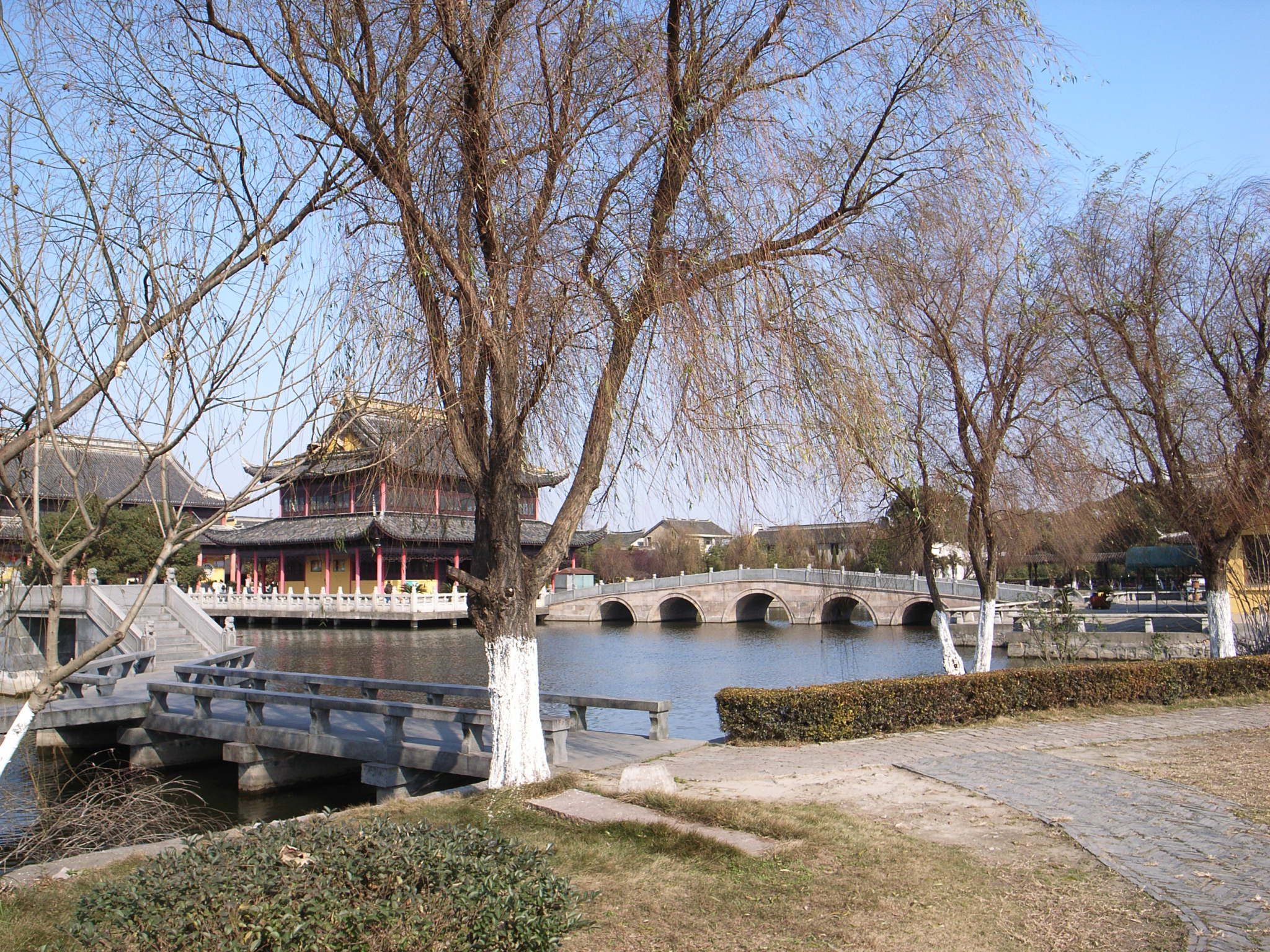
The Chengxu Temple in Zhouzhuang

Standing on Zhongshi Street on the opposite side of Puqing Bridge, Chengxu Taoist Temple was built during 1086–1093 of the Song dynasty and also known as Sanctity Hall (Shengtang Hall). After several periods of expansion, it became one of the most famous Taoist temples in Wuzhong Region. In an area of 1,500 square meters (1,800 square yards), Shengdi and Doumu halls, Yuhuang, Wenchang and Shengdi pavilions are pieces of Taoist architectures.

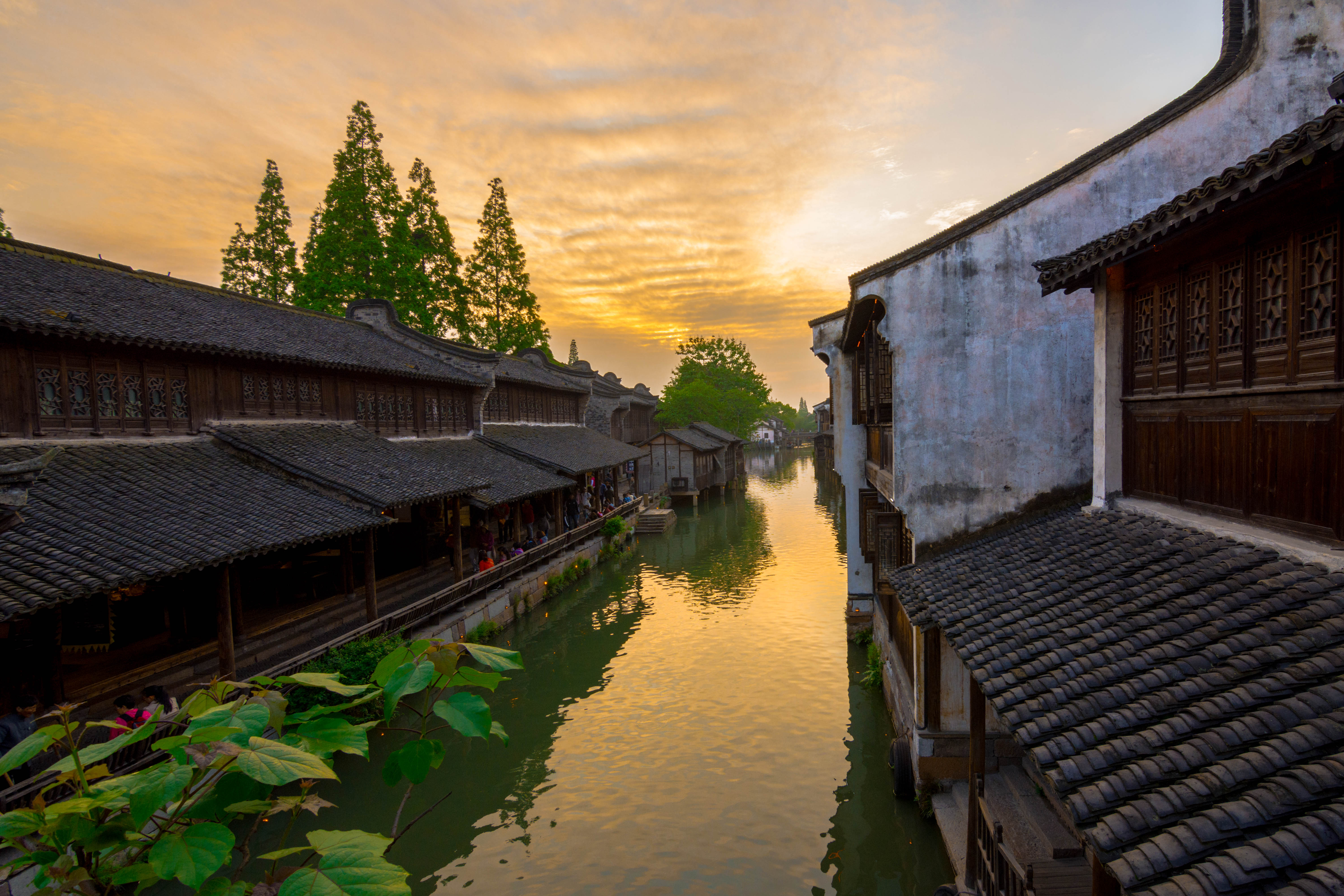

== Local food ==
=== Wansan pork ===
The most famous local food of Zhouzhuang is Wansan pork hock, named after Shen Wansan, the richest man in the late Yuan and early Ming dynasty in Jiangnan.

=== Sanwei Glutinous rice balls ===
Sanwei Glutinous rice balls are commonly called soup gluten. In the area of Jiangnan, rice balls are a delicious dish that every family would make at home.

== See also ==
- Wuzhen
