= Little Paris =

Little Paris may refer to:

== Places (cities or neighborhoods) ==
A nickname for...

- Atça, a town in Turkey, planned from Charles de Gaulle Square
- Bojnord, capital city of North Khorasan province, Iran, Paris Kuchulu (Paris the little)
- Bucharest, the capital of Romania, Micul Paris, more popularly nicknamed "Paris of the East"
- Carroll Gardens, Brooklyn, a neighborhood in the New York City borough where an important community of French expatriates, French-speaking immigrants or American citizens of French descent live
- Da Lat, a city in Vietnam
- Korçë, a city in Albania known for its architecture and metropolitan origins
- Küçük Paris, a neighbourhood in the south of Plovdiv, Bulgaria, the name of which means "Little Paris" in Turkish
- Leipzig, a city in Germany, Klein-Paris (Little Paris, Goethe) or Paris des Ostens (Paris of the East)
- Little Paris, a cultural heritage project and micro neighborhood occupying the stretch of Centre Street between Grand Street and Broome Street in SoHo, New York
- Maharda, a largely Christian city in central Syria referred to as 'little Paris' by the people of Hama
- Sinj, a city in Croatia
- South Kensington, an affluent district of West London in the Royal Borough of Kensington and Chelsea, where a strong French community lives
- St. Martinville, Louisiana, a city in the USA which was historically called Petit Paris (Little Paris)
- Stolp, a town in the Province of Pomerania that became known as Klein-Paris (Little Paris) during the Weimar Republic
- Tianducheng, a planned residential community of Hangzhou that is designed to resemble Paris, France

== Other uses ==
- Little Paris (film), 2008 German film

== See also ==
- Paris
- Paris of the North (disambiguation)
- Paris of the East (disambiguation)
- Paris of the South (disambiguation)
- Paris of the West (disambiguation)
- Paris of the Plains, the nickname given to the American city of Kansas City, Missouri
- Paris of the Prairies, the sobriquet given to the Canadian city of Saskatoon, Saskatchewan
