= West Athens =

West Athens may refer to:

- West Athens (regional unit), Greece
- West Athens, California, US
