= Southern district, Plovdiv =

District of Plovdiv, Bulgaria

Coordinates: 42°7′22″N 24°44′29″E

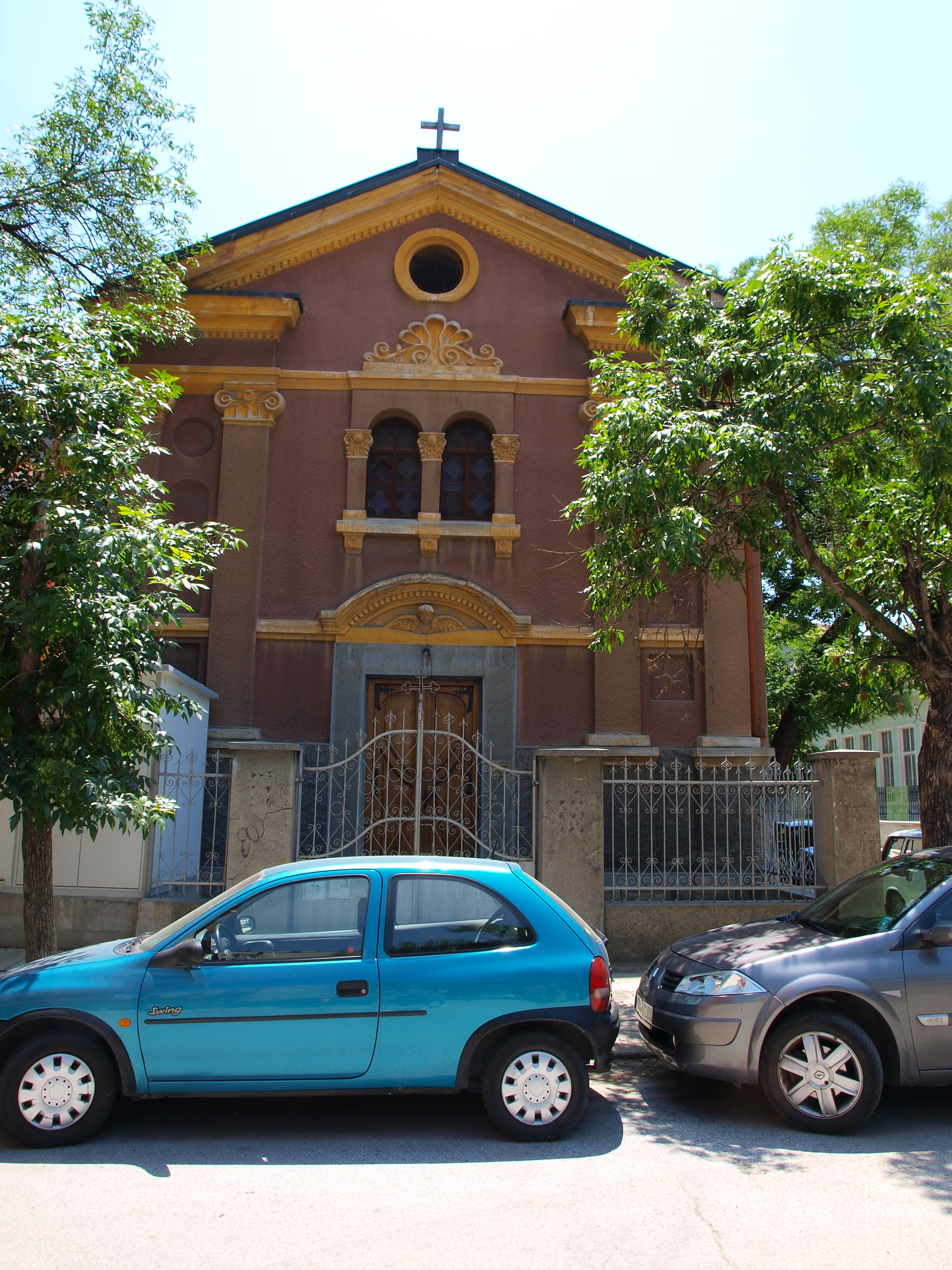
A Catholic church in Küçük Paris

Southern district (Bulgarian: Район Южен) is one of the six districts of Plovdiv in southern Bulgaria. It has a population of 79,330. The district includes the so-called "Küçük Paris" (meaning small Paris in Turkish), Belomorski and Ostromila quarters and Komatevo.

== "Küçük Paris" name origin ==
Following the defeats in the Second Balkan War, and the First World War, a great number of refugees from the lost territories settled in Plovdiv. They settled in what is today the Southern District in temporary housing which was referred to as "Küçük Paris" ("Little Paris"). An explanation for the name was the shot tower built in 1927, the highest structure in the town at that time, which very roughly resembled the Eiffel Tower in Paris.

== Toponymy ==
As the refugees which built the area came from Aegean Thrace and Macedonia, the majority of the streets in this district are named after revolutionaries and geographical locations in these lost territories. Examples include streets named after the cities of Kukush, Ohrid, Prilep, Skopje and after the notable revolutionaries Dame Gruev and Gotse Delchev.
