= Paris of the South =

Title of cities

The description Paris of the South has been applied to a number of locations, including:

- Adelaide, Australia
- Barcelona, Spain
- Buenos Aires, Argentina
- Melbourne, Australia
- Mobile, Alabama, United States
- New Orleans, Louisiana, United States
- Nice, France
- Asheville, North Carolina, United States
- Rio de Janeiro, Brazil
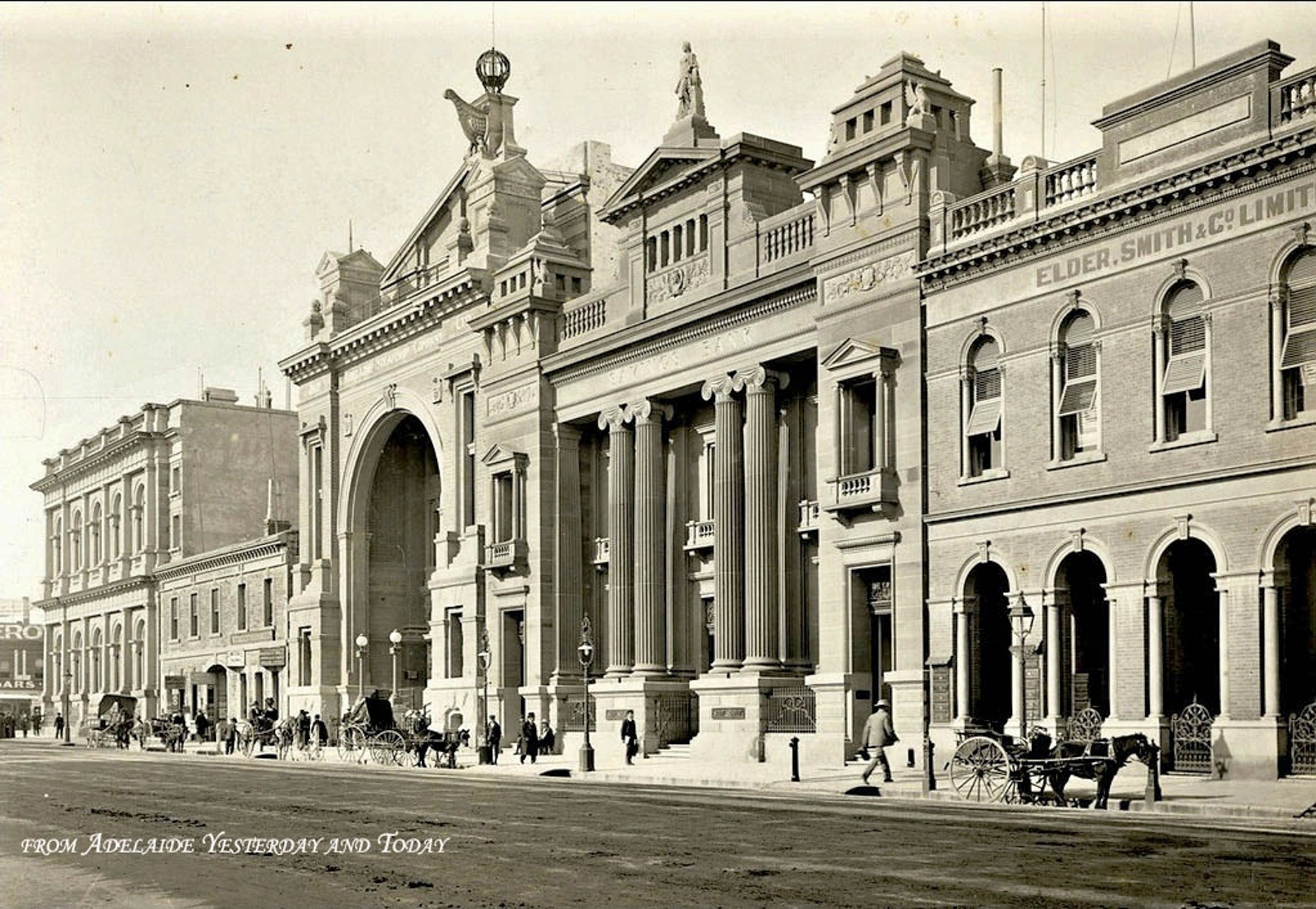
Adelaide, Australia

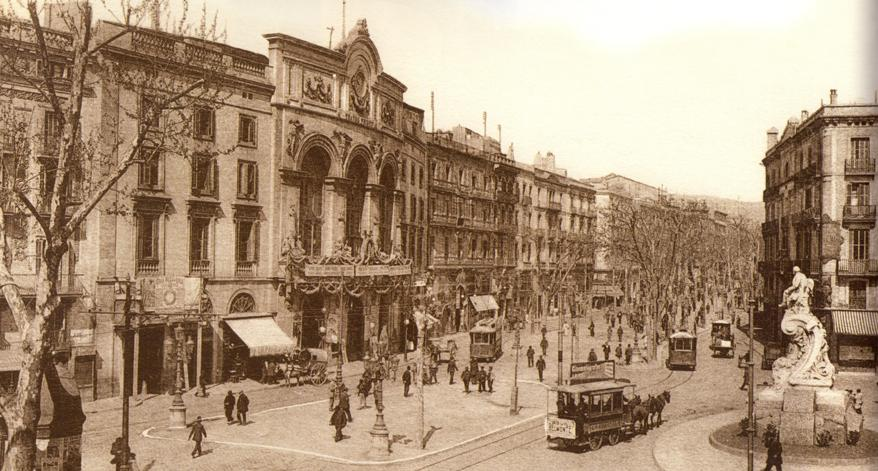
Barcelona, Spain

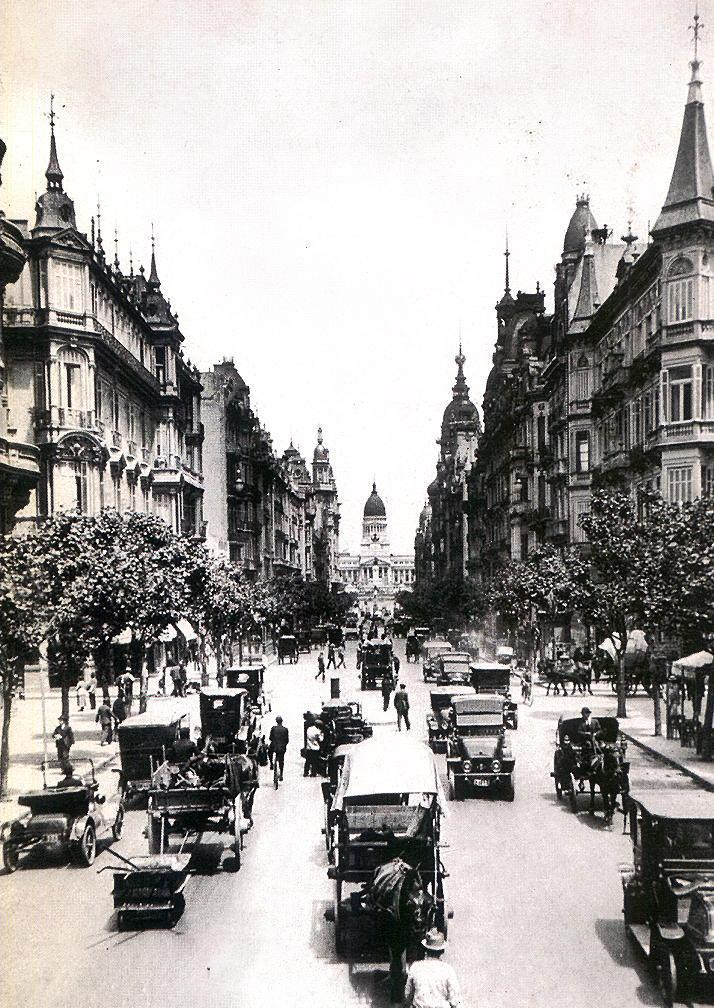
Buenos Aires, Argentina

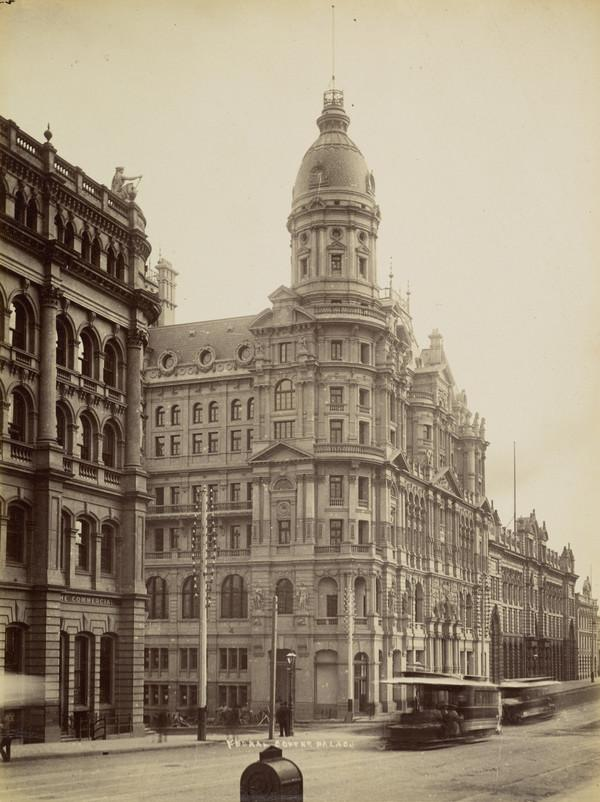
Melbourne, Australia

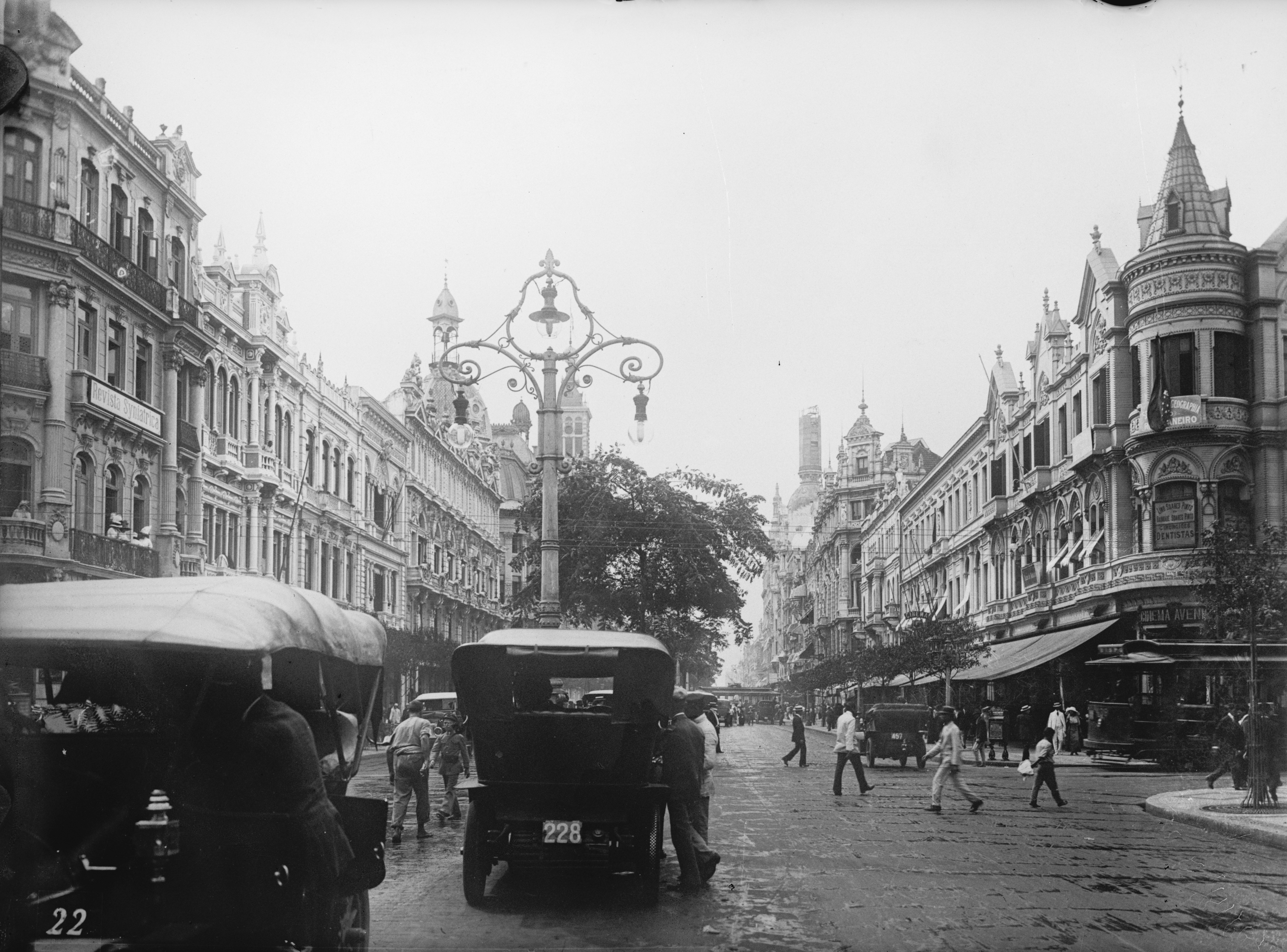
Rio de Janeiro, Brazil

== See also ==
- Paris
- Paris of the North (disambiguation)
- Paris of the East (disambiguation)
- Paris of the West (disambiguation)
- Little Paris (disambiguation)
- Paris of the Plains, the nickname given to the American city of Kansas City, Missouri
- Paris of the Prairies, the sobriquet given to the Canadian city of Saskatoon, Saskatchewan
