= Paris of the North =

Title of cities

The description Paris of the North has been applied to a large number of locations, including:

- Aalborg, Denmark
- Dawson City, Yukon, Canada
- Glasgow, Scotland
- Kaunas, Lithuania
- Newcastle, England, United Kingdom
- Reykjavík, Iceland
- Riga, Latvia
- Saint Petersburg, Russia
- Szczecin, Poland
- Tromsø, Norway
- Turku, Finland
- Warsaw, Poland
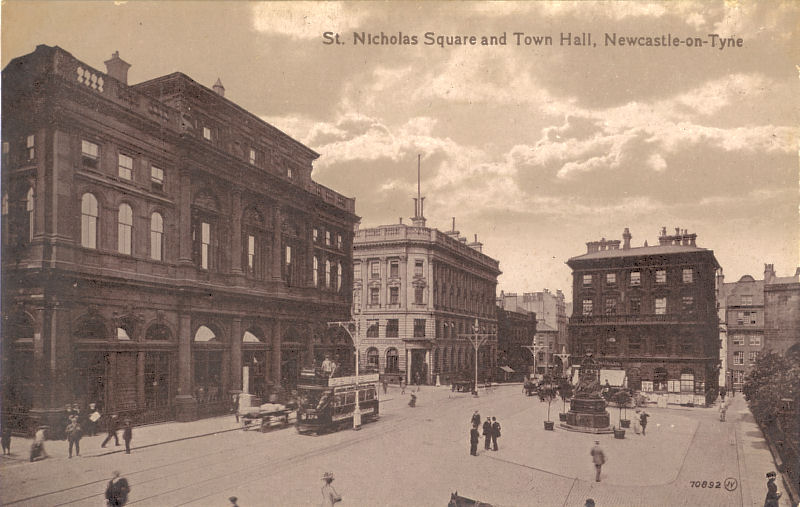
Newcastle, England, United Kingdom

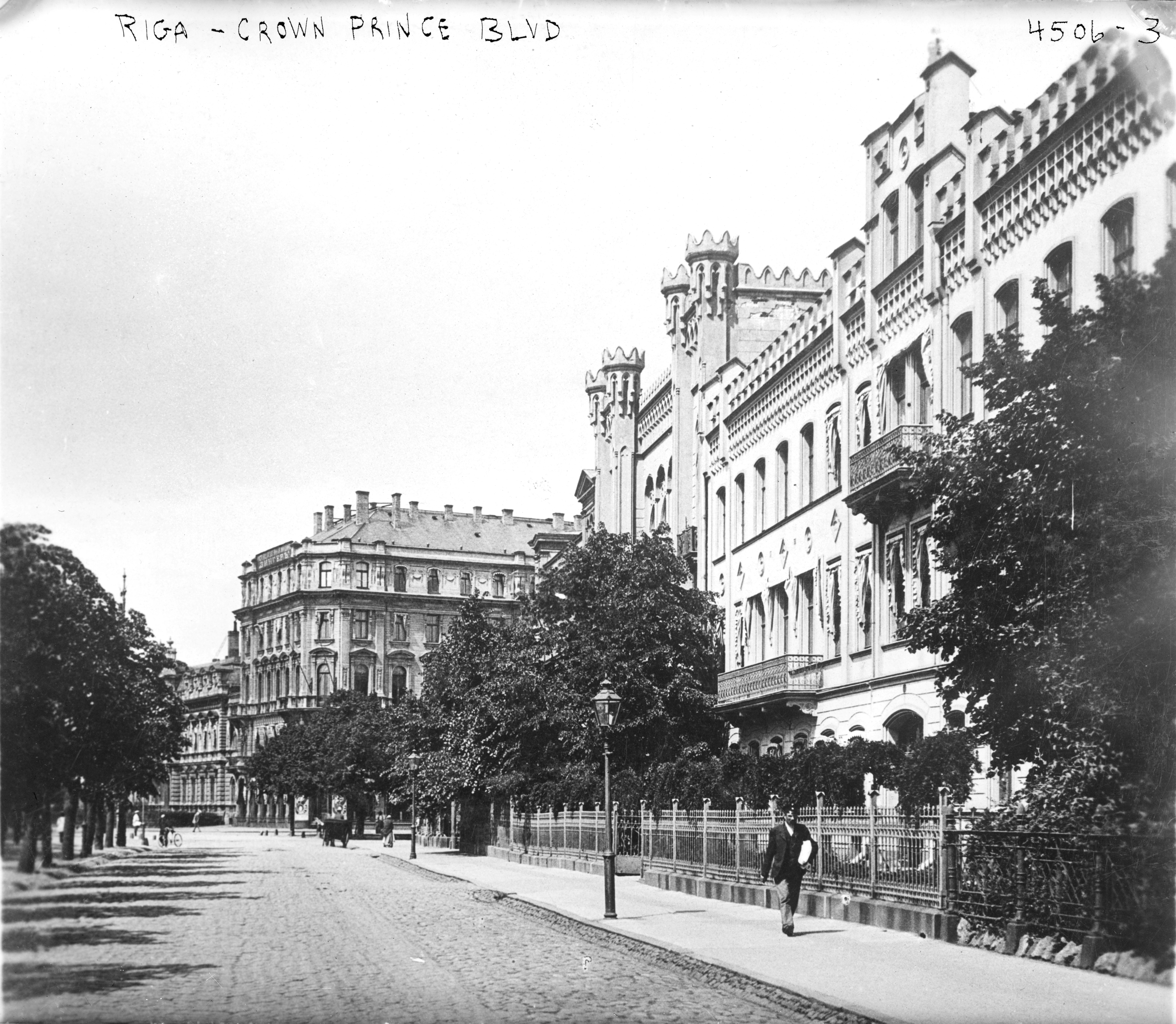
Riga, Latvia

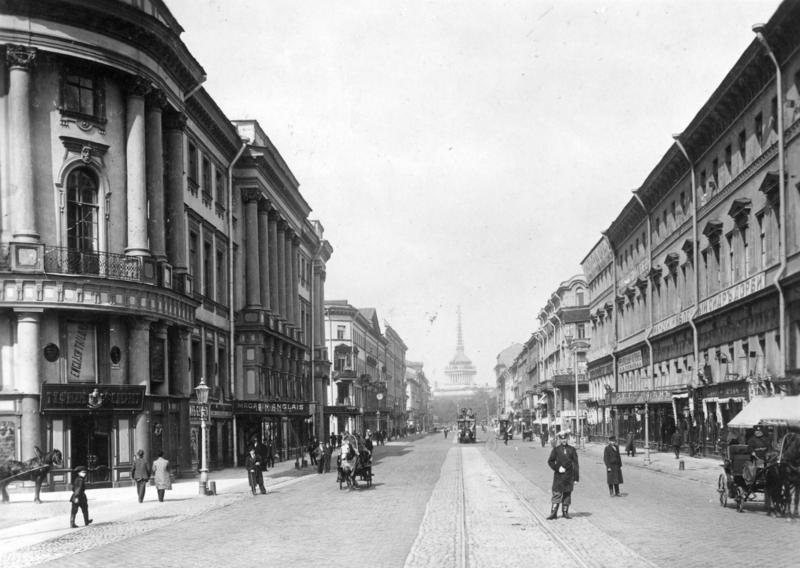
Saint Petersburg, Russia

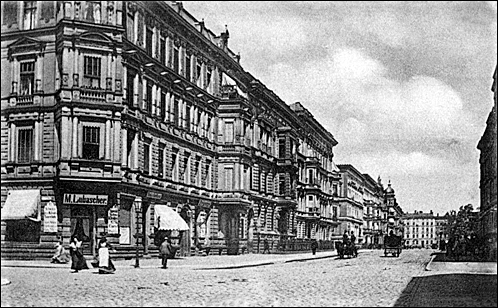
Szczecin, Poland

== See also ==
- Paris
- Paris of the East (disambiguation)
- Paris of the South (disambiguation)
- Paris of the West (disambiguation)
- Little Paris (disambiguation)
- Paris of the Plains, the nickname given to the American city of Kansas City, Missouri
- Paris of the Prairies, the sobriquet given to the Canadian city of Saskatoon, Saskatchewan
