= Paris of the West =

Title of cities

The description Paris of the West or in some cases Paris of America has been applied to a number of locations, including:

- Buenos Aires, Argentina
- Cincinnati, Ohio, United States
- Denver, Colorado, United States
- Detroit, Michigan, United States
- Merida, Yucatán, Mexico
- Montreal, Québec, Canada
- San Francisco, California, United States
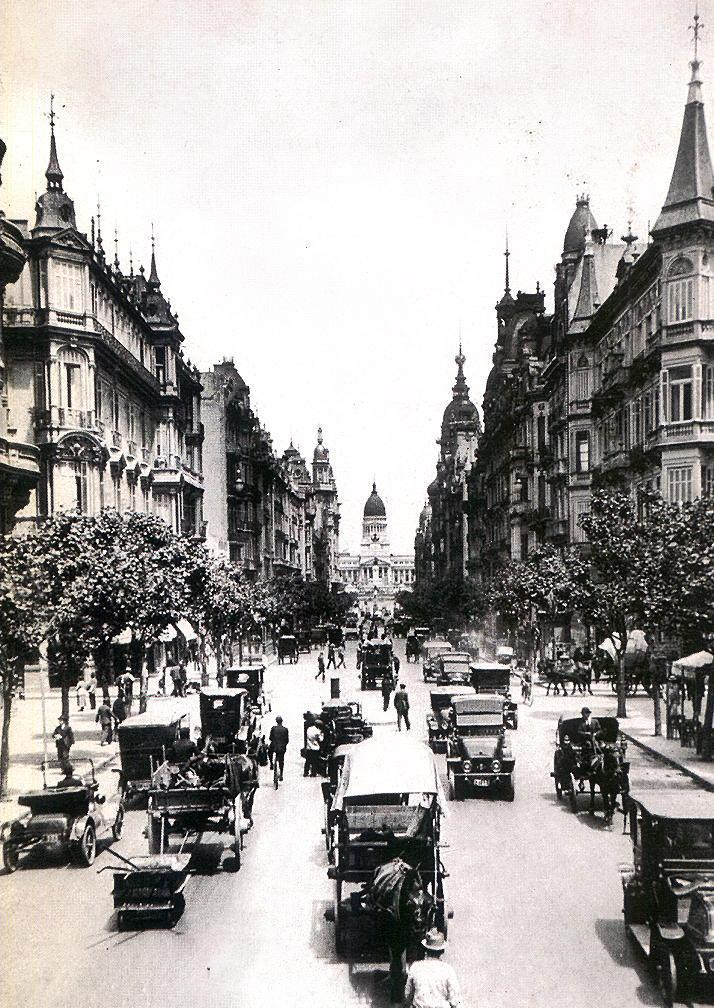
Buenos Aires, Argentina

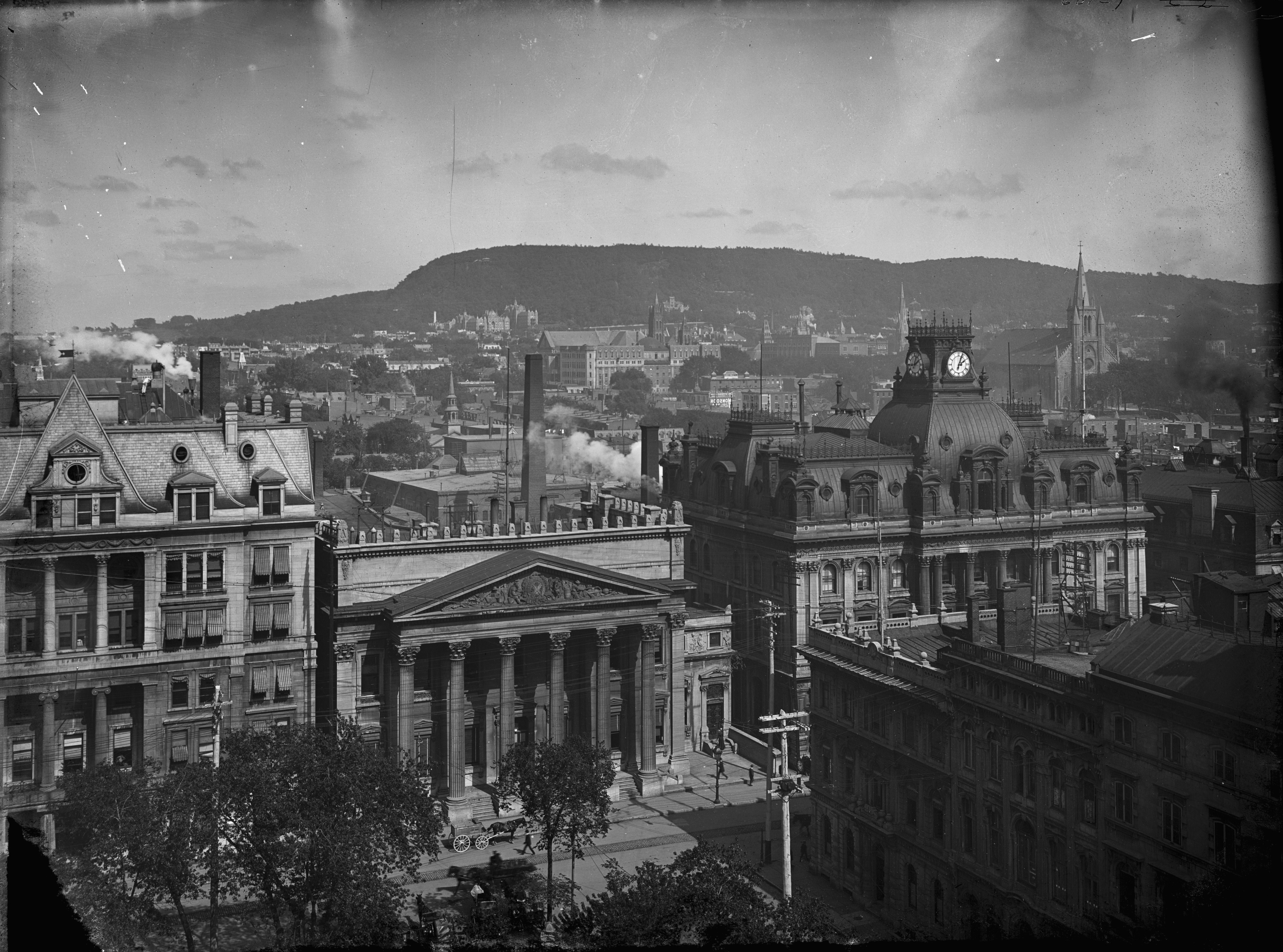
Montreal, Canada

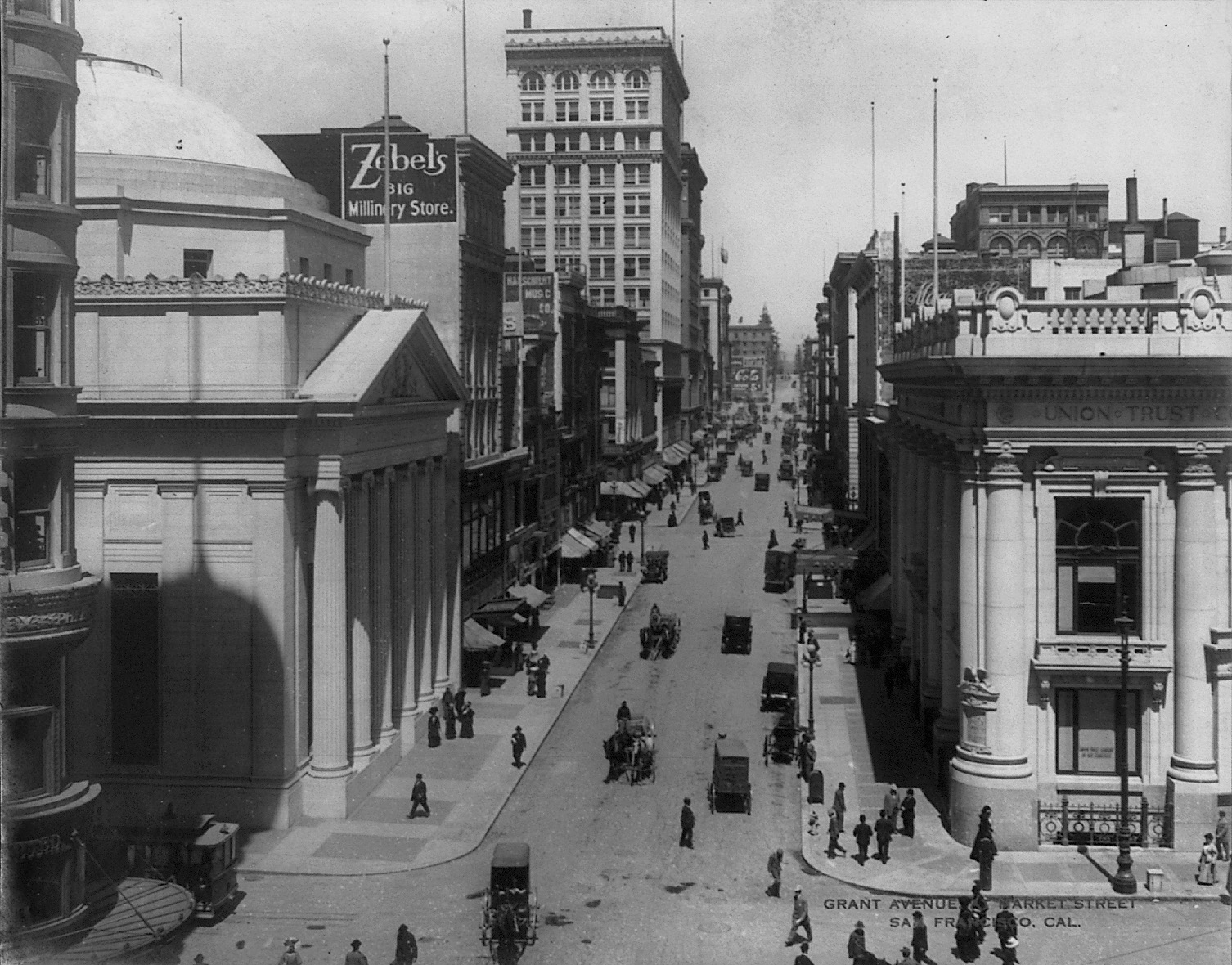
San Francisco, United States

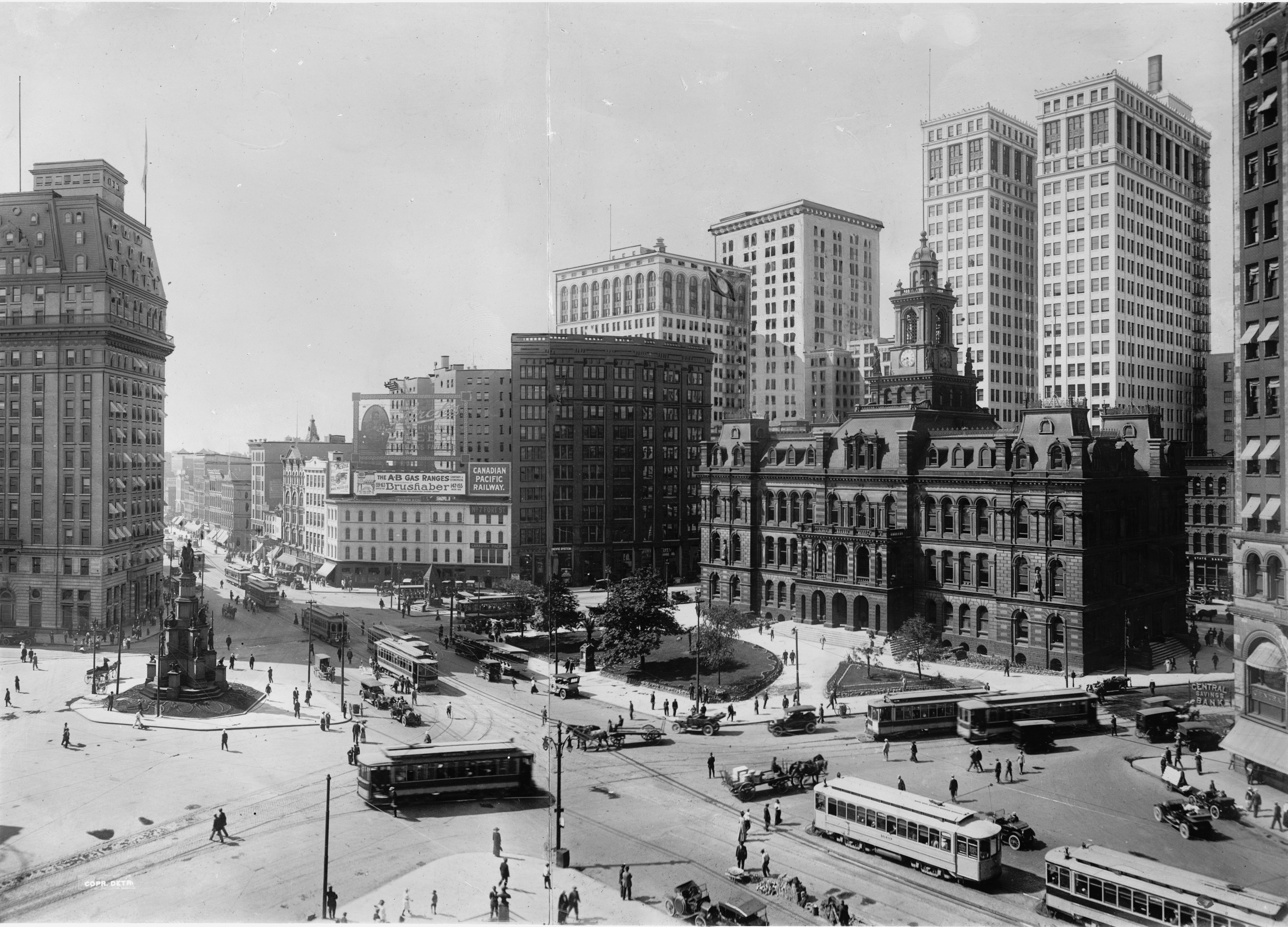
Detroit, United States

== See also ==
- Paris
- Paris of the North (disambiguation)
- Paris of the East (disambiguation)
- Paris of the South (disambiguation)
- Little Paris (disambiguation)
- Paris of the Plains, the nickname given to the American city of Kansas City, Missouri
- Paris of the Prairies, the sobriquet given to the Canadian city of Saskatoon, Saskatchewan
