= Paris of the East =

The description Paris of the East has been applied to a large number of locations, including:

- Baku, Azerbaijan
- Beirut, Lebanon
- Bucharest, Romania
- Budapest, Hungary
- Hanoi, Vietnam
- Isfahan, Iran
- Istanbul, Turkey
- Kolkata, India
- Lahore, Pakistan
- Manila, Philippines
- Pondicherry, India
- Prague, Czech Republic
- Riga, Latvia
- Saigon, Vietnam
- Shanghai, China
- Warsaw, Poland
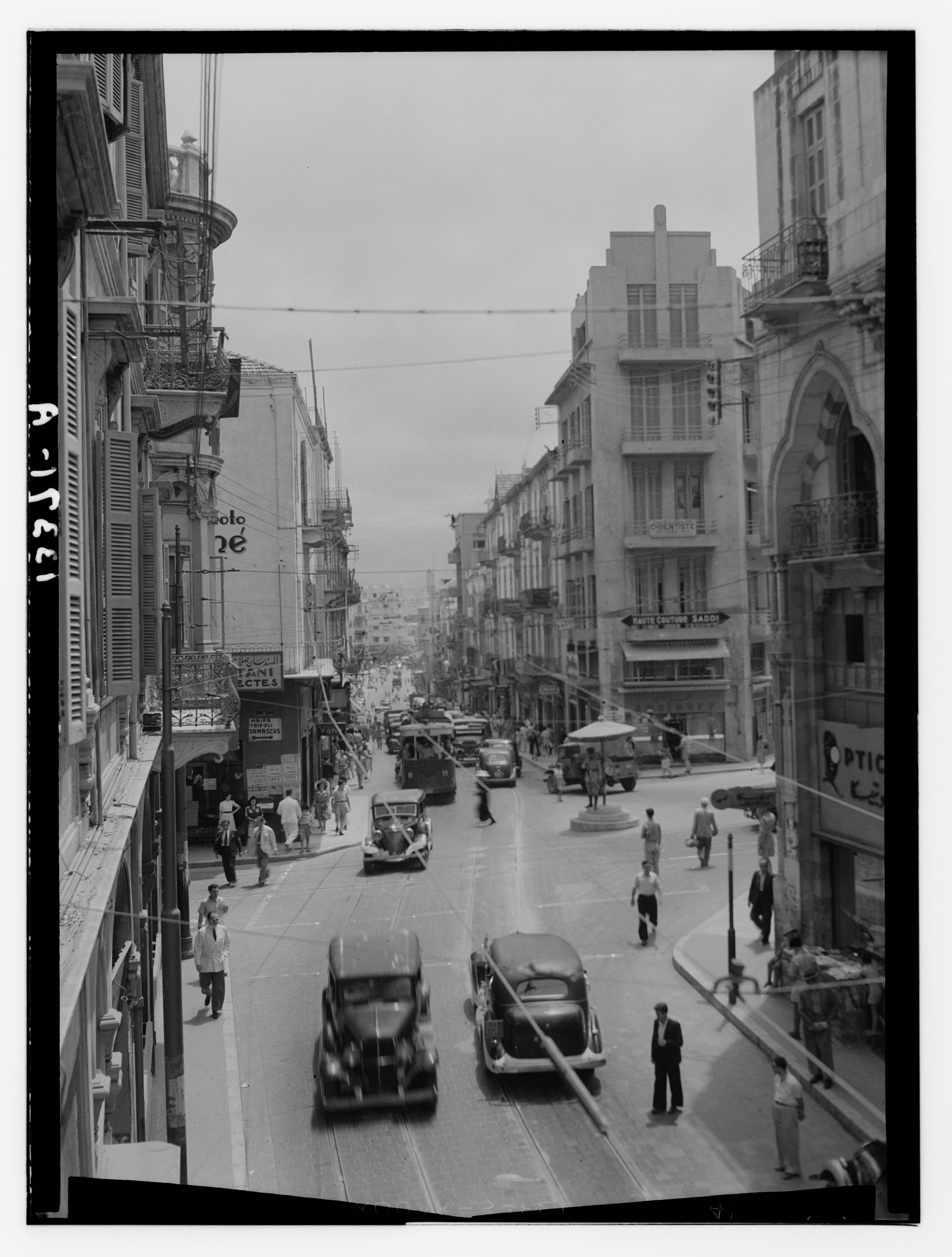
Beirut, Lebanon

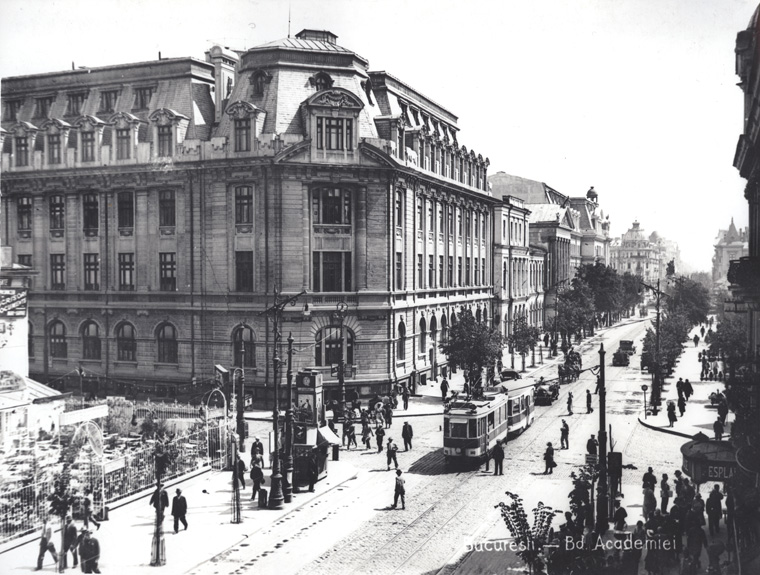
Bucharest, Romania

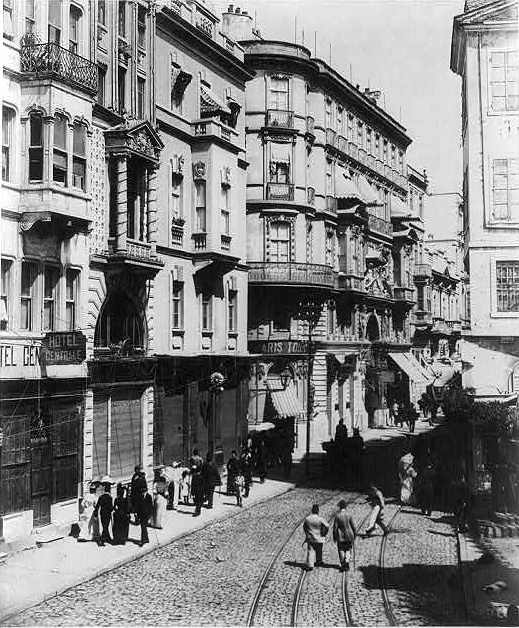
İstanbul, Turkey

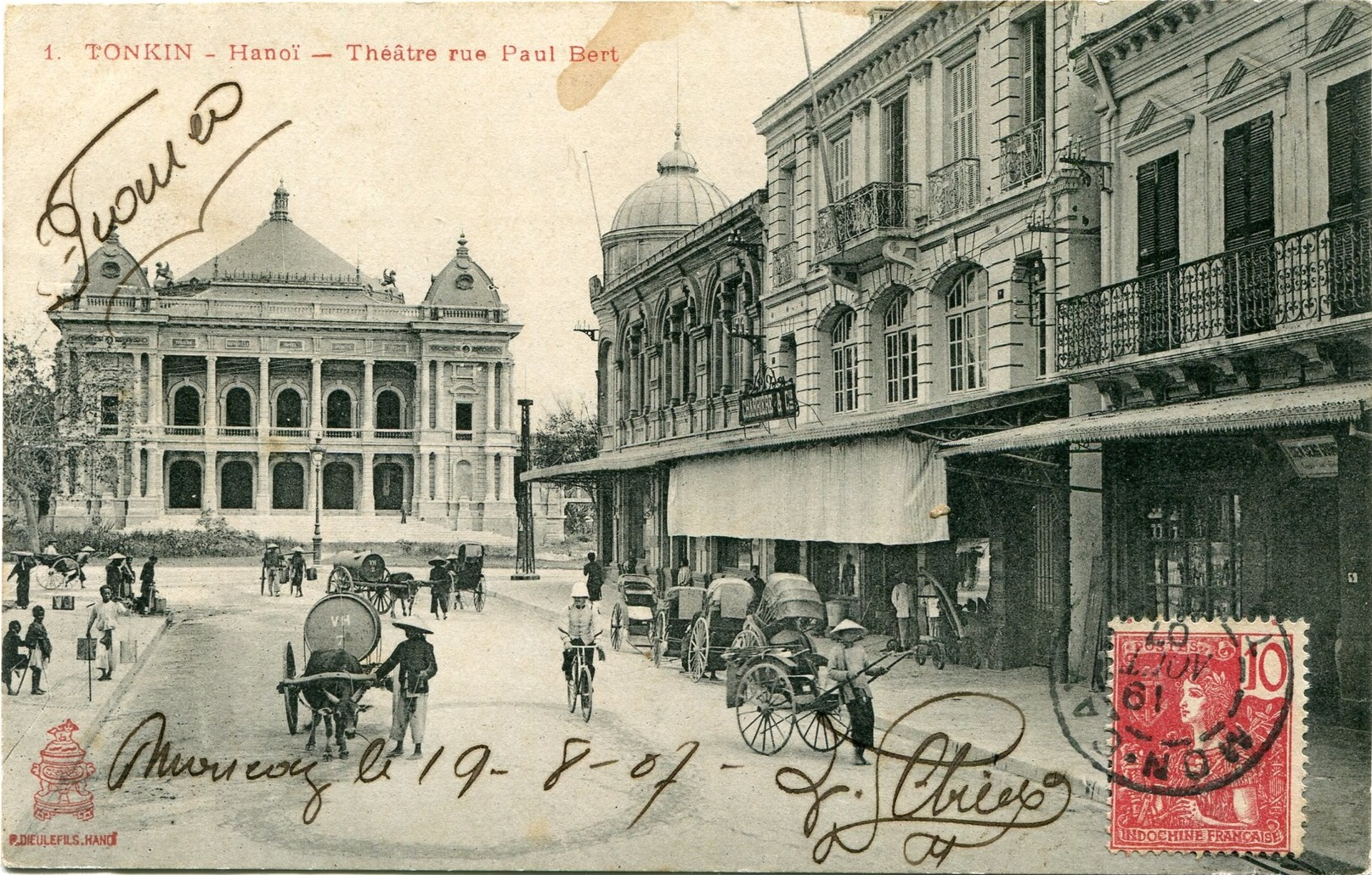
Hanoi, Vietnam

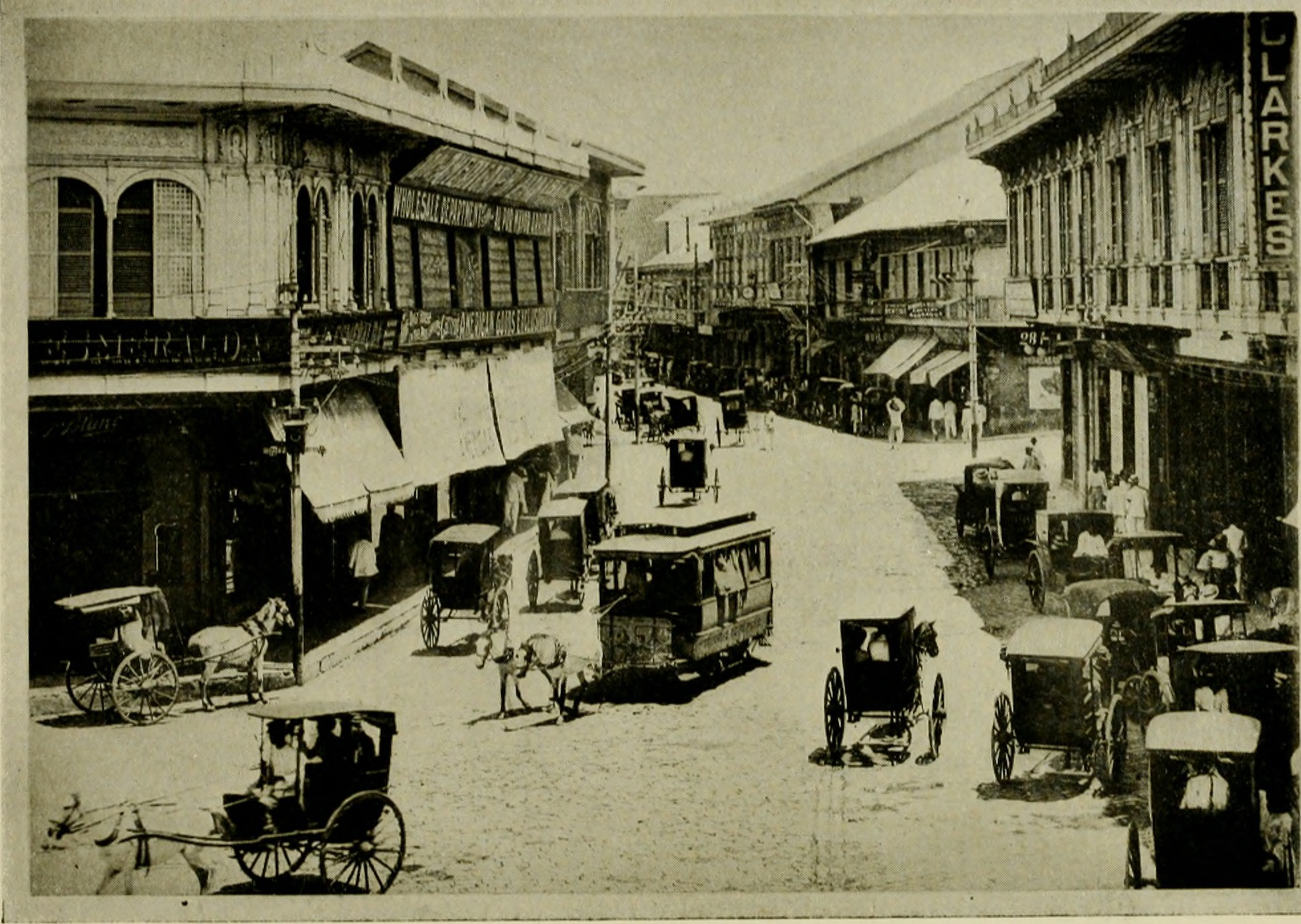
Manila, Philippines

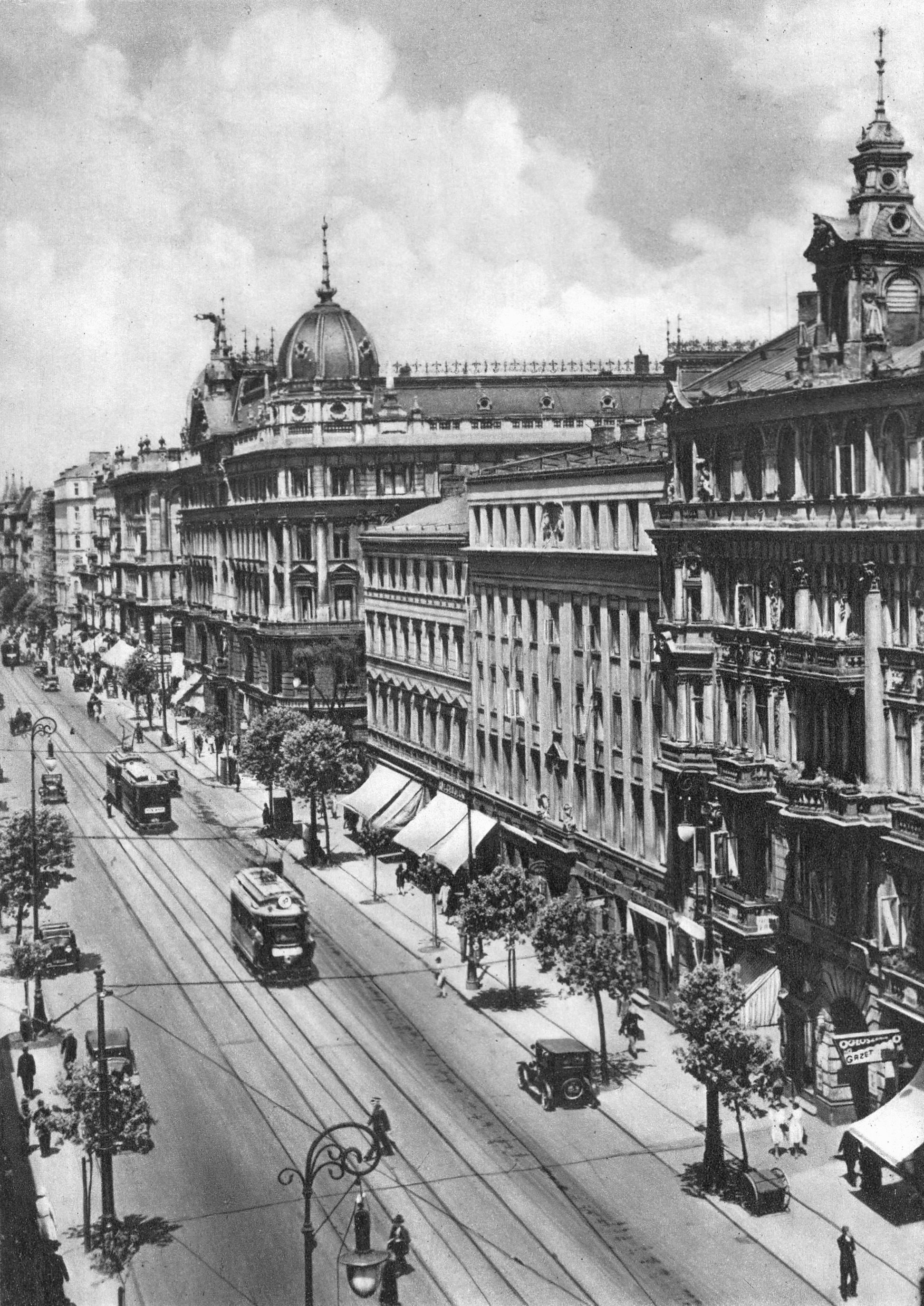
Warsaw, Poland

== See also ==
- Paris
- Paris of the North (disambiguation)
- Paris of the South (disambiguation)
- Paris of the West (disambiguation)
- Little Paris (disambiguation)
- Paris of the Plains, the nickname given to the American city of Kansas City, Missouri
- Paris of the Prairies, the sobriquet given to the Canadian city of Saskatoon, Saskatchewan
- Athens of the North (disambiguation), … South
- Rome of the West, Second Rome (disambiguation), Third Rome
