= Roman (given name) =

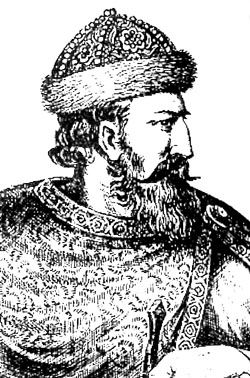
- Roman the Great, Grand Prince of Kiev
- Gender: Male

Origin
- Origin: Latin
- Meaning: Being Roman, belonging to the Roman/"Byzantine" Empire or From Rome
- Region of origin: Europe

Other names
- Alternative spelling: Cyrillic: Роман. Román, Romão, Romain
- Variant form: Female form Romana
- Related names: Romulus, Romanus, Romanos, Romano, Romeo, Rodman

Roman is a masculine given name meaning from Rome, which originated within the Roman Empire, via Latin. In its initial sense, the title "Roman", (Romanus in Latin and Romanos in Greek) denotes a member of the Roman Empire, or belonging to or identifying with Roman (or Byzantine) culture. It most likely evolved from Romulus, the legendary co-founder of Rome.

Due to Byzantine cultural influence the name Roman (the Slavic variant of Romanos/Romanus) is widely used amongst Eastern and Western Slavs. The name day for Roman varies between countries. Román in Spanish is a popular given name in Spanish-speaking countries, especially in Latin-America.

Variations of the name include:

- Catalan: Romà
- French: Romain
- German: Roman
- Hungarian: Román
- Italian: Romano
- Latvian: Romāns
- Portuguese: Romão
- Spanish: Román
- Greek: Ρωμανός (Romanós)
- Polish, Czech, Slovak: Roman
- Romanian: Roman
- Russian, Ukrainian: Роман (Roman)
- Belarusian: Раман (Raman)

Roman may refer to:

== People named Roman ==
=== Pre-20th century ===
- Roman of Đunis (9th century), Christian saint
- Roman of Bulgaria (early 930s – 997), Tsar of Bulgaria
- Roman Svyatoslavich (c. 1052–1079), Prince of Tmutarakan in Kyyivs’ka Rus'
- Roman I of Kiev (died 1180), Prince of Smolensk, Grand Prince of Kyiv and Prince of Novgorod
- Roman the Great (c. 1152–1205), Grand Prince of Kyiv
- Roman Danylovich (c. 1230 – c. 1261), Prince of Black Ruthenia (Navahradak), Prince of Slonim?
- Roman I of Moldavia, Voivode of Moldavia (1391–1394)
- Roman II of Moldavia, co-ruler of Moldavia (1447–1448)
- Roman Aguirre (1864–1897), Filipino patriot and one of the Nineteen Martyrs of Aklan
- Roman Bagration (1778–1834), Georgian prince and Imperial Russian Army general
- Román Baldorioty de Castro (1822–1889), Puerto Rican politician and abolitionist
- Román Basa (1848–1897), Filipino patriot
- Roman Hoffstetter (1742–1815), German monk and composer
- Roman Sołtyk (1790–1843), Polish nobleman, political activist and general
- Roman Żuliński (1837–1864), Polish mathematician and co-commander of the January Uprising

=== Modern ===
- Roman Ablakimov (born 1987), Kyrgyzstani footballer
- Roman Abraham (1891–1976), Polish general
- Roman Abramovich (born 1966), Russian oligarch
- Roman Abramovsky (born 1973), Ukrainian civil servant and politician
- Roman Abrosimov (born 1994), Russian ice hockey player
- Roman Adamov (born 1982), Russian footballer
- Roman Aftanazy (1914–2004), Polish historian and author
- Roman Akbashev (born 1991), Russian footballer
- Roman Akhalkatsi (born 1980), Georgian former footballer
- Roman Aleksandrov (born 1976), Kazakhstani journalist
- Roman Amoyan (born 1983), Armenian wrestler
- Roman Anderson (born 1969), English football player
- Roman Anin (born 1986), Russian investigative journalist
- Roman Anthony (born 2004), American baseball player
- Roman Antoszewski (1935–2017), Polish professor in plant physiology
- Roman Aparicio (born 1980), Aruban footballer
- Roman Artymowski (1919–1993), Polish painter and educator
- Roman Asrankulov (born 1999), Kazakhstani footballer
- Roman Atwood (born 1983), American YouTube personality and prankster
- Roman Avdeev (born 1967), Russian businessman, investor, and philanthropist
- Roman Avramenko (born 1988), Ukrainian javelin thrower
- Roman Baber (born 1980), Canadian politician
- Roman Badanin (born 1970), Russian journalist and researcher
- Roman Balayan (born 1941), Ukrainian-Armenian film director
- Roman Bannwart (1919–2010), Swiss theologian, priest, and musician
- Roman Bausch (born 1982), German politician
- Roman Bednář (born 1983), Czech footballer
- Roman Begala (born 1999), Slovak footballer
- Roman Begunov (born 1993), Belarusian footballer
- Roman C. Benavente, Northern Mariana Islander politician
- Roman Benecký (born 2000), Czech darts player
- Roman Berdnikov (born 1974), Russian major general
- Roman Berezovsky (born 1974), Armenian football coach and former player
- Roman Bezjak (born 1989), Slovenian footballer
- Roman Bezpalkiv (1938–2009), Ukrainian painter
- Roman Bezrukavnikov (born 1973), American mathematician
- Roman Bezsmertnyi (born 1965), Ukrainian politician
- Roman Bezus (born 1990), Ukrainian footballer
- Roman Bílek (born 1967), Czech racewalker
- Roman Bilinski (born 2004), Polish racing driver
- Roman Bochkala (born 1984), Ukrainian war correspondent
- Roman Bodnar (born 1974), Ukrainian politician
- Roman Bodnya (born 2001), Ukrainian footballer
- Roman Bohnen (1901–1949), American actor
- Roman Bondarenko (born 1966), Turkmenistan footballer
- Roman Bondaruk (born 1974), Ukrainian sport shooter
- Roman Borvanov (born 1982), Moldovan tennis player
- Roman Borysevych (born 1993), Ukrainian footballer
- Roman Botvynnyk (born 1993), Ukrainian footballer
- Roman Boyko (born 1977), Russian politician
- Roman Brandstaetter (1906–1987), Polish writer
- Roman Buess (born 1992), Swiss footballer
- Roman Bugaj (born 1973), Polish boxer
- Roman Bunka (1951–2022), German instrumentalist and composer
- Roman Burki (born 1990), Swiss Football Goalkeeper
- Roman Burtsev (1971–2023), Russian serial killer and pedophile
- Roman Busargin (born 1981), Russian politician
- Roman Butenko (1980–2012), Ukrainian footballer
- Roman Bykov (born 1992), Russian football player
- Roman Čechmánek (1971–2023), Czech ice hockey player
- Roman Celentano (born 2000), American soccer player
- Roman Čerepkai (born 2002), Slovak footballer
- Roman Červenka (born 1985), Czech ice hockey player
- Román Chalbaud (1931–2023), Venezuelan film director
- Roman Chatov (1900–1987), American artist
- Roman Chatrnúch (born 1973), Slovak professional ice hockey defenceman
- Roman Chervinsky (born 1974), Ukrainian military man and counterintelligence officer
- Roman Chumak (born 1982), Ukrainian football goalkeeper
- Roman Chwalek (1898–1974), German trade unionist and politician
- Roman Chytilek (born 1976), Czech chess player
- Roman Cieślewicz (1930–1996), Polish-French artist
- Roman Ciorogariu (1852–1936), Romanian bishop
- Roman Codreanu (1952–2001), Romanian wrestler
- Román Colón (born 1979), Dominican baseball player
- Román Comas (born 1999), Argentine professional footballer
- Roman Coppola (born 1965), American filmmaker, screenwriter, producer and entrepreneur
- Roman Cress (born 1977), Marshallese sprinter
- Román Cuello (born 1977), Uruguayan footballer and coach
- Roman Cycowski (1901–1998), American singer
- Roman Danylak (1930–2012), Canadian-Ukrainian Catholic bishop
- Roman Danylo, Canadian comedian
- Roman Griffin Davis (born 2007), English actor
- Roman Dmowski (1864–1939), Polish politician
- Roman Dobrokhotov (born 1983), Russian investigative journalist
- Roman Dolidze (born 1988), Georgian mixed martial artist
- Roman Dzindzichashvili (born 1944), American chess player
- Roman Eremenko (born 1987), Finnish football player
- Roman Fazi (born 1999), Afghan footballer
- Roman Ferber (born 1993), Belgian footballer
- Roman Filipov (1984–2018), Russian military pilot
- Roman Fosti (born 1983), Estonian long-distance runner
- Roman Frigg (born 1972), Swiss philosopher and professor
- Roman Fritz (born 1966), Polish politician
- Roman Gabriel (1940–2024), American football player
- Roman Ghirshman (1895–1979), French archaeologist
- Roman Giertych (born 1971), Polish politician and lawyer
- Roman Glick, American bass guitarist
- Roman Golanowski (born 1969), Polish long jumper
- Roman Golovchenko (born 1973), Belarusian politician and former prime minister of Belarus
- Roman Greenberg (born 1982), Israeli boxer
- Roman Gribbs (1925–2016), American politician
- Roman Hamrlík (born 1975), Czech ice hockey player
- Roman Harper (born 1982), American football player
- Roman Herzog (1934–2017), German politician
- Roman Hruska (1904–1999), American politician
- Roman Hryhorchuk (born 1965), Ukrainian football player and coach
- Roman Hryshchuk (born 1989), Ukrainian politician
- Roman Hubník (born 1984), Czech football player
- Roman Ingarden (1893–1970), Polish philosopher
- Roman Ivanovsky (born 1977), Russian swimmer
- Roman Jackiw (1939–2023), Polish-American theoretical physicist
- Roman Jakobson (1896–1982), Russian-American philologist
- Roman Jasinski (1907–1991), Polish ballet dancer
- Roman Jebavý (born 1989), Czech tennis player
- Roman Josi (born 1990), Swiss ice hockey player
- Roman Jugg, Welsh punk musician
- Roman Kachanov (1921–1993), a Russian animator
- Roman Romanovich Kachanov (born 1967), Russian film director
- Roman Kantor (1912–1943), Polish épée fencer
- Roman Kantserov (born 2004), Russian ice hockey player
- Roman Karmen (1906–1978), Soviet film director, journalist, pedagogue, and publicist
- Roman Kemp (born 1993), English radio host
- Roman Kerschbaum (born 1994), Austrian footballer
- Roman Khudyakov (born 1977), Russian politician
- Roman Kim (born 1991), Kazakh violinist, composer and inventor
- Roman Klein (1858–1924), Russian architect and educator
- Roman Kłosowski (1929–2018), Polish actor
- Roman Kofman (1936–2026), Ukrainian composer and conductor
- Roman Kopin (born 1974), Russian politician
- Roman Kopylov (born 1991), Russian mixed martial artist
- Roman Kostomarov (born 1977), Russian ice dancer
- Roman Koudelka (born 1989), Czech ski jumper
- Roman Kreuziger (born 1986), Czech road bicycle racer
- Roman Kroitor (1926–2012), Canadian filmmaker
- Roman Krzyżelewski (born 1949), Polish Navy commander-in-chief
- Román Loayza (born 1948), Bolivian politician and farmer
- Roman Macek (born 1997), Czech footballer
- Roman Madyanov (1962–2024), Soviet-Russian actor
- Roman Malinovsky (1876–1918), Russian politician
- Roman Mars, American radio journalist and producer
- Román Martínez, multiple people
- Roman Mashovets (born 1976), Ukrainian politician
- Román Mejías (1925–2023), Cuban baseball player
- Roman Miroshnichenko (born 1977), Ukrainian-Russian guitarist and composer
- Roman Mitichyan (born 1978), Armenian actor and mixed martial arts fighter
- Roman Mityukov (born 2000), Swiss swimmer
- Roman Neustädter (born 1988), German football player
- Roman Oben (born 1972), American football player
- Roman Ondak (born 1966), Slovak conceptual artist
- Roman Opałka (1931–2011), Polish painter
- Roman Osin (born 1961), British cinematographer
- Roman Oreshchuk (born 1975), Russian footballer, agent, and official
- Roman Pavlyuchenko (born 1981), Russian football player
- Roman Petrenko (born 1964), Russian businessman
- Roman Polák (born 1986), Czech ice hockey player
- Roman Polanski (born 1933), Polish film director
- Roman Procházka (born 1989), Slovak footballer
- Roman Protasevich, Belarusian journalist, blogger, activist
- Roman Ptitsyn (born 1975), Russian politician
- Roman Putin (born 1977), Russian businessman and politician
- Roman Quinn (born 1993), American baseball player
- Roman Rashada (born 2001), American football player
- Roman Rasskazov (born 1979), Russian race walker
- Román Recarte (born 1987), Venezuelan tennis player
- Roman Repilov (born 1996), Russian luger
- Roman Reigns (born 1985), American professional wrestler, currently signed to the WWE
- Roman Romanenko (born 1971), Russian cosmonaut
- Roman Romanov, multiple people
- Roman Romulo (born 1967), Filipino politician
- Roman Rosen (1847–1921), Russian diplomat
- Roman Rubinshteyn (born 1996), Belarusian-Israeli basketball player
- Roman Rudenko (1907–1981), Soviet lawyer
- Roman Rurua (born 1942), Soviet wrestler
- Roman Safiullin (born 1997), Russian professional tennis player
- Roman Salanoa (born 1997), American rugby union player
- Roman Šebrle (born 1974), Czech decathlete
- Roman Seleznev (born 1984), Russian computer hacker
- Roman U. Sexl (1939–1986), Austrian physicist
- Roman Sharonov (born 1976), Russian footballer
- Roman Shchurenko (born 1976), Ukrainian long jumper
- Roman Shirokov (born 1981), Russian football player
- Roman Shukhevych (1907–1950), Ukrainian politician and military leader
- Roman Silantyev (born 1977), Russian sociologist
- Roman Skorniakov (born 1976), Russian-born figure skater
- Roman Smishko (born 1983), Ukrainian football player
- Roman Sorkin (born 1996), Israeli basketball player
- Roman Staněk (born 2004), Czech racing driver
- Roman Starchenko (born 1986), Kazakhstani ice hockey player
- Roman Starovoyt (1972–2025), Russian politician
- Roman Szporluk (born 1933), Ukrainian-American political scientist and historian
- Roman Szymański (1840–1908), Polish political activist, publicist, and editor
- Roman Tam (1950–2002), Hong Kong singer
- Roman Toi (1916–2018), Estonian composer
- Roman Tomas (born 1980), Slovak ice hockey player
- Roman Tomaszewski (born 1960), Polish chess player
- Roman Trakhtenberg (1968–2009), Russian radio journalist
- Roman Trotsenko (born 1970), Russian billionaire businessman
- Roman Turek (born 1970), Czech ice hockey player
- Roman Turovsky-Savchuk (born 1961), American artist
- Roman Týce (born 1977), Czech footballer
- Roman Ubakivi (born 1945), Estonian football player and coach
- Roman (Robert) von Ungern-Sternberg (1886–1921), Russian Lieutenant General
- Roman Vasyanov (born 1980), Russian cinematographer
- Román Vega (born 2004), Argentine footballer
- Roman Verostko (born 1929), American artist and educator
- Roman Vishniac (1897–1990), Russian photographer
- Roman Vlad (1919–2013), Romanian-Italian musicologist
- Roman Vlasov (born 1990), Russian wrestler
- Roman Volodkov (born 1973), Ukrainian diver
- Roman Wäger (born 1963), Swiss ice hockey player
- Roman Walker (born 2000), Welsh cricketer
- Roman Wallner (born 1982), Austrian professional footballer
- Roman Wanecki, Polish Paralympic volleyball player
- Roman Wapiński (1931–2008), Polish historian
- Roman Waschuk (born 1962), Ukrainian politician
- Roman Weidenfeller (born 1980), German football player
- Roman L. Weil (1940–2023), American economist
- Roman Werfel (1906–2003), Polish politician
- Roman White, American music video director
- Roman Wick (born 1985), Swiss ice hockey player
- Roman Wilhelmi (1936–1991), Polish actor
- Roman Will (born 1992), Czech ice hockey goaltender
- Roman Wilson (born 2001), American football player
- Roman Woelfel (born 1974), German physician, virologist and Bundeswehr colonel
- Roman Wójcicki (born 1958), Polish footballer
- Roman Wojtusiak (1906–1987), Polish zoologist and professor
- Roman Wörndle (1913–1942), German alpine skier
- Roman Woźniak (1903–1963), Polish politician, steelworker, and starosta
- Roman Yakovlev (born 1976), Russian volleyball player
- Roman Yakub (born 1958), American composer
- Roman Yakuba (born 2001), Ukrainian footballer
- Roman Yalovenko (born 1997), Ukrainian footballer
- Roman Yampolskiy (born 1979), Latvian computer scientist
- Roman Yanushkovsky (born 1995), Russian footballer
- Roman Yaremchuk (born 1995), Ukrainian football player
- Roman Yazvinskyy (born 1986), Ukrainian luger
- Roman Yegorov (born 1974), Russian swimmer
- Roman Yemelyanov (born 1992), Russian footballer
- Roman Yeremin (born 1997), Kazakhstani biathlete
- Roman Yevgenyev (born 1999), Russian footballer
- Roman Yevmenyev (born 1979), Russian footballer
- Roman Yezhov (born 1997), Russian footballer
- Roman Yuzepchuk (born 1997), Belarusian footballer
- Roman Zabzaliuk (died 2018), Ukrainian politician
- Roman Zach (born 1973), Czech actor
- Roman Zakharkiv (born 1991), Ukrainian luger
- Roman Zakharyin-Koshkin (died 1543), Russian boyar
- Roman Zakrzewski (1955–2014), Polish painter
- Roman Zambrowski (1909–1977), Polish politician
- Roman Zamulin (born 1984), Russian serial killer
- Román Zaragoza (born 1998), American actor
- Roman Zaretski (born 1983), Belarusian-Israeli ice dancer
- Roman Zaretsky (born 1983), Israeli ice dancer
- Roman Zaslavsky, Russian-Israeli classical pianist
- Roman Zawiliński (1855–1932), Polish linguist, pedagogue and ethnographer
- Roman Zentsov (born 1973), Russian mixed martial arts fighter
- Roman Zenzinger (1903–1990), Austrian artist and commercial designer
- Roman Zirnwald (born 1982), Austrian badminton player
- Roman Zobnin (born 1994), Russian footballer
- Roman Zolotov (born 1974), Russian ice hockey player
- Roman Zozulya (born 1979), Ukrainian artistic gymnast
- Roman Zozulya (born 1989), Ukrainian footballer
- Roman Zub (born 1967), Ukrainian footballer
- Roman Zubarev, Russian chemist
- Roman Zvarych (born 1953), Ukrainian politician
- Roman Zvonkov (1967–1995), Ukrainian biathlete

== Fictional characters ==
- Roman Allen, a character in the TV series, EastEnders
- Roman Bellic, a character in the video game Grand Theft Auto IV
- Roman Brady, a character in the soap opera Days of Our Lives
- Roman Bridger, a character in the film Scream 3
- Roman Carax, a character in the anime series Cyberpunk: Edgerunners 2
- Roman Pearce, reformed street racing criminal from The Fast and the Furious series
- Roman Reigns, ring name of professional wrestler Leati Joseph Anoaʻi in WWE
- Roman Sionis, a supervillain appearing in DC comics

== See also ==
- Romain (disambiguation)
- Romano (disambiguation)
- Romanus (disambiguation)
