= Romanov (surname) =

Romanov (feminine Romanova) is Russian and Bulgarian patronymic surname derived from the given name Roman. It is primarily associated with the House of Romanov, the second and last imperial dynasty to rule over Russia. Notable people with the surname, other than from the imperial House of Romanov include:

- Alexander Romanov (fighter), Moldovan mixed martial artist
- Alexander Romanov (ice hockey, born 2000), Russian hockey player
- Alexandra Romanova (disambiguation)
- Andrew Romanoff (born 1966), American politician
- Georgi Romanov (born 1999), Russian ice hockey player
- Grigory Romanov (1923–2008), Soviet statesman and Hero of Socialist Labor
- Giana Romanova (born 1955), Soviet middle-distance runner
- Irina Romanova (disambiguation)
- Ivan Romanov (1607?–1640), uncle of Tsar Michael I, first Romanov Tsar of Russia
- Ivan Romanov (Catholic bishop) (1878–1953), Bulgarian Roman Catholic prelate
- Konstantin Romanov (disambiguation)
- Maria Romanova (disambiguation)
- Maxim Romanov, Russian rugby league player
- Michael Romanov (disambiguation)
- Mikhail Timofeyevich Romanov (1891–1941), Soviet army officer
- Nicholas Romanov (disambiguation)
- Olga Romanova (athlete) (born 1980), Russian long-distance runner
- Panteleimon Romanov (1884–1938), Russian/Soviet writer
- Roman Romanov (Lithuanian businessman) (born 1976)
- Roman Romanov (Ukrainian businessman) (born 1972)
- Roman Romanov (footballer, born 1981), Russian footballer
- Roy Romanow (born 1939), Canadian politician
- Sergey Romanov (born 1958), Russian radiation scientist
- Stephanie Romanov (born 1969), Russian-American model and actress
- Vladimir Romanov, Russian-Lithuanian businessman
- Vladislav Romanov, Bulgarian footballer
- Yelena Romanova, Russian middle-distance runner

== Fictional ==
- Natalia Romanov, from the Grey Griffins novel series
- Nene Romanova, from Bubblegum Crisis
- Tatiana Romanova, a James Bond girl
- Alexander Romanov (Command & Conquer), the Soviet Premier in Red Alert 2
- Black Widow (Natasha Romanova), a spy in Marvel Comics
- Helena Cassadine, a character from General Hospital; her maiden name is Romanov

== See also ==
- Romaniuk
- Romanenko
- Romanenkov
