= Romanenko =

Romanenko (Ukrainian: Романенко) is a Ukrainian patronymic surname derived from the first name Roman. Notable people with the surname include:

- Alexei Romanenko, Russian-American cellist
- Prokofy Romanenko (1897–1949), Soviet general
- Roman Romanenko (born 1971), Russian cosmonaut, son of Yuri Romanenko
- Tetyana Romanenko, Ukrainian football striker
- Vitali Romanenko (1926 – 2010), Ukrainian sport shooter
- Vladimir Romanenko (born 1987), Russian professional footballer
- Volodymyr Romanenko, professional Ukrainian football midfielder
- Vsevolod Romanenko (born 1977), Ukrainian football player
- Yuri Romanenko (born 1944), Soviet cosmonaut

== Fictional characters ==
- Nastasha Romanenko, fictional character in the Metal Gear series

== See also ==
- Romanenko, Volgograd Oblast, Russia
- Romaniuk
- Romanenkov
- Romanov
