= List of Russia international footballers =

The following is a list of footballers who have played for the Russia national football team.

== Players ==
Player	Caps	Goals	First cap, opponent
Roman Adamov	3	0	2008, Romania
Andrey Afanasyev	4	0	1993, United States
Igor Akinfeyev	110	0	2004, Norway
Yevgeny Aldonin	29	0	2002, Sweden
Dmitry Alenichev	55	6	1996, Iceland
Dmitry Ananko	1	0	2001, Greece
Aleksandr Anyukov	77	1	2004, Austria
Ari	2	0	2018, Germany
Aleksey Arifullin	1	0	1998, Turkey
Andrey Arshavin	75	17	2002, Belarus
Aleksey Bakharev	1	0	1998, Brazil
Nikita Bazhenov	1	0	2008, Netherlands
Aleksey Berezutsky	58	0	2003, Cyprus
Vasily Berezutsky	101	5	2003, Switzerland
Vladimir Beschastnykh	71	26	1992, Mexico
Artyom Bezrodny	1	0	1999, Andorra
Diniyar Bilyaletdinov	46	5	2005, Latvia
Anton Bobyor	1	0	2002, Estonia
Maksim Bokov	3	0	1997, Yugoslavia
Aleksandr Borodyuk	8	4	1992, Luxembourg
Albert Borzenkov	1	0	1998, Georgia
Denis Boyarintsev	6	0	2004, Norway
Viktor Budyansky	2	0	2007, Andorra
Aleksey Bugayev	7	0	2004, Austria
Aleksandr Bukharov	9	1	2009, Azerbaijan
Viktor Bulatov	6	0	1998, Brazil
Dmitry Bulykin	15	7	2003, Ireland
Taras Burlak	1	0	2011, Cameroon
Yevgeny Bushmanov	7	0	1996, Iceland
Vladimir But	2	0	1999, Belarus
Maksim Buznikin	8	5	2000, Slovakia
Pyotr Bystrov	2	0	2003, Switzerland
Vladimir Bystrov	47	4	2004, Bulgaria
Nikita Chernov	2	0	2015, Belarus
Denis Cheryshev	31	12	2012, United States
Denis Davydov	1	0	2015, Kazakhstan
Vyacheslav Dayev	8	0	2001, Slovenia
Maksim Demenko	2	0	2000, United States
Igor Denisov	53	0	2008, Germany
Igor Dobrovolsky	18	2	1992, Iceland
Yury Drozdov	10	0	1999, Armenia
Alan Dzagoyev	58	9	2008, Germany
Soslan Dzhanayev	3	0	2016, Costa Rica
Georgy Dzhikiya	36	1	2017, Hungary
Artyom Dzyuba	55	30	2011, Greece
Viktor Fayzulin	24	4	2012, Ivory Coast
Vladimir Gabulov	10	0	2007, Poland
Dmitry Galyamin	6	0	1993, Saudi Arabia
Yury Gazinsky	21	1	2016, Turkey
Aleksey Gerasimenko	7	1	1997, Switzerland
Denis Glushakov	57	5	2011, Qatar
Aleksandr Golovin	41	5	2015, Belarus
Sergey Gorlukovich	17	0	1993, Israel
Aleksandr Gorshkov	2	0	1998, Poland
Vladimir Granat	13	1	2013, Luxembourg
Maksim Grigoryev	4	0	2012, United States
Sergey Grishin	3	1	1997, Luxembourg
Nikolai Gromov	1	0	1913, Luxembourg
Guilherme	16	0	2016, Lithuania
Rolan Gusev	31	1	2000, Slovakia
Sergey Ignashevich	126	8	2002, Sweden
Vladislav Ignatyev	5	0	2015, Portugal
Aleksei Ionov	35	4	2011, Qatar
Oleg Ivanov	5	0	2015, Belarus
Ruslan Kambolov	6	0	2015, Kazakhstan
Maksim Kanunnikov	12	0	2014, Slovakia
Aleksandr Kerzhakov	91	30	2002, Estonia
Aleksandr Kokorin	47	12	2011, Greece
Dmitry Kombarov	44	2	2012, Denmark
Aleksey Kozlov	14	0	2014, Portugal
Stanislav Kritsyuk	2	0	2014, Lithuania
Fyodor Kudryashov	45	1	2016, Turkey
Ilya Kutepov	13	0	2016, Costa Rica
Oleg Kuzmin	5	1	2015, Sweden
Vladimir Lash	2	0	1914, Sweden
Yury Lodygin	11	0	2013, South Korea
Yevgeny Makeyev	3	0	2011, Qatar
Ilya Maksimov	1	0	2016, Lithuania
Pavel Mamayev	15	0	2010, Belgium
Aleksey Miranchuk	36	6	2015, Belarus
Pavel Mogilevets	4	0	2014, Slovakia
Elmir Nabiullin	1	0	2015, Kazakhstan
Roman Neustädter	13	0	2016, Czech Republic
Ivan Novoseltsev	5	0	2015, Kazakhstan
Magomed Ozdoyev	35	4	2014, Azerbaijan
Kirill Panchenko	1	0	2016, Qatar
Sergey Parshivlyuk	3	0	2014, Azerbaijan
Sergey Petrov	5	0	2016, Ghana
Dmitry Poloz	19	2	2014, Azerbaijan
Igor Portnyagin	1	0	2015, Kazakhstan
Artyom Rebrov	2	0	2014, Moldova
Mikhail Romanov	2	0	1914, Sweden
Aleksandr Ryazantsev	5	0	2011, Cameroon
Aleksandr Samedov	39	5	2011, Slovakia
Georgy Shchennikov	10	0	2012, Ivory Coast
Andrey Semyonov	27	0	2014, Norway
Oleg Shatov	28	2	2013, Iceland
Roman Shirokov	56	13	2008, Romania
Roman Shishkin	16	0	2007, Estonia
Igor Smolnikov	30	0	2013, South Korea
Fyodor Smolov	39	14	2012, United States
Dmitry Tarasov	5	1	2013, Serbia
Dmitry Torbinsky	29	2	2007, Estonia
Yevgeny Varlamov	10	1	1998, Poland
Dmitry Vasilyev	1	0	2003, Israel
Viktor Vasin	13	2	2010, Belgium
Oleg Veretennikov	4	0	1996, Brazil
Roman Vorobyov	2	0	2007, Poland
Dmitry Yefremov	1	0	2015, Kazakhstan
Aleksandr Yerokhin	26	1	2016, Turkey
Vadim Yevseyev	20	1	1999, Andorra
Artur Yusupov	2	0	2015, Croatia
Yury Zhirkov	104	2	2005, Italy
Roman Zobnin	38	0	2015, Kazakhstan
