= Black death and Yankee beetles =

German exhibition on biological warfare

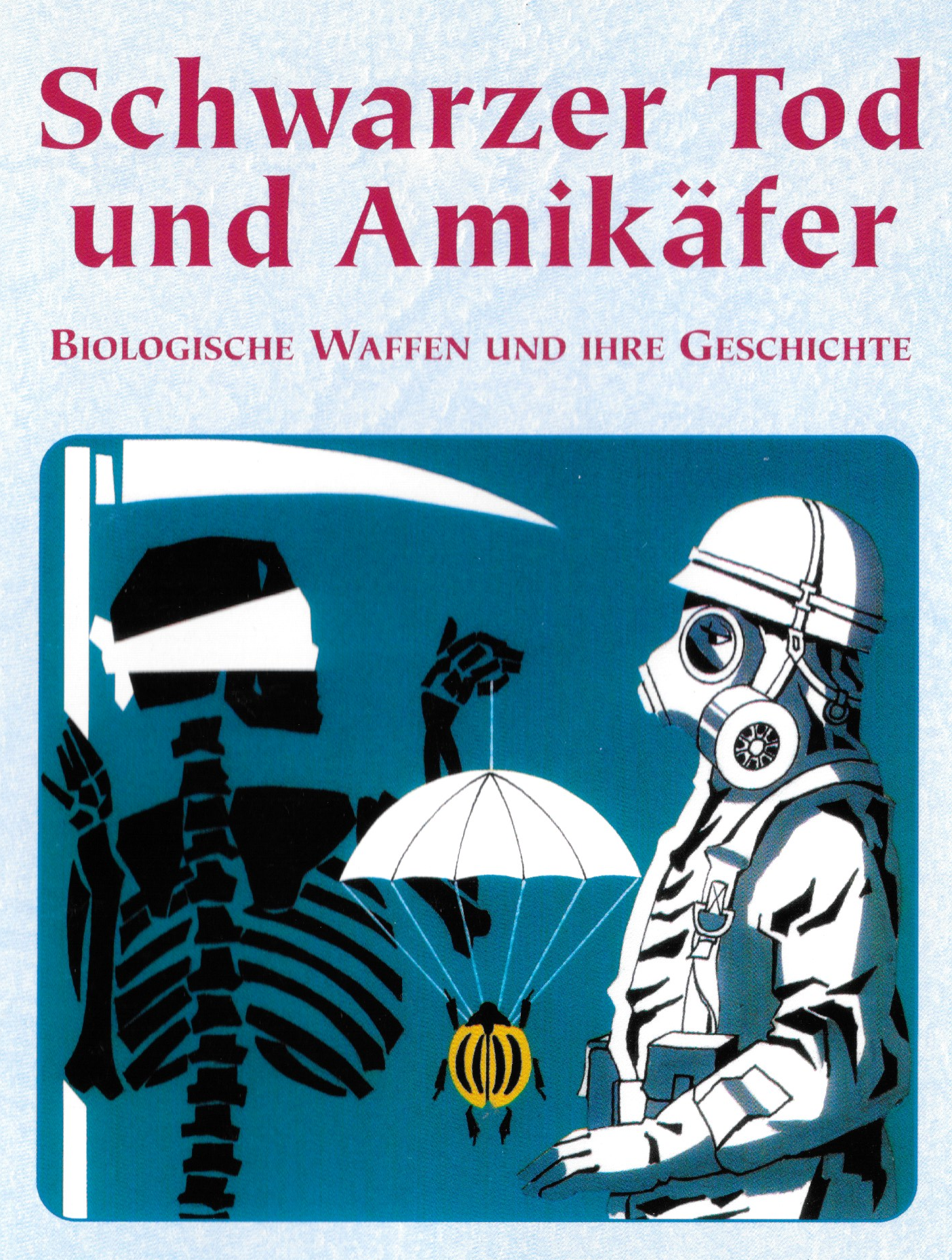
Exhibition poster

Black death and Yankee beetles (German title: Schwarzer Tod und Amikäfer) is the name of a travelling exhibition on the history of biological agents and biological warfare. It debuted in the year 2000 as a continuation of the exhibition „Die Sachsenburg und der biologische Krieg" ("Sachsenburg Castle and Biological Warfare") which has been on display at Sachsenburg Castle since 1998.

== Exhibition title ==
The first part of the exhibition title refers to the Plague, which was historically known as the Black Death. Its pathogens are dual-threat agents, as they are both naturally ocurring infectious bacteria and potential biological agents. During World War II the Wehrmacht created an institute for microbiology in Sachsenburg Castle with the goal of developing a vaccine.

As agricultural pests, Colorado potato beetles are also dual threat agents. They were considered for use in biological warfare as early as World War I. Their use was tested during World War II but they were never deployed. By 1950 the GDR was barely in control of its potato beetle plague. The party and state leadership spread the claim the beetles had been dropped by US aircraft. Paul Merker, Secretary for Agriculture for the Party Executive Central Secretariat gave the beetle the name Yankee Beetle (Amikäfer) after suggesting they should henceforth only be referred to as such in a letter to Walter Ulbricht on June 15, 1960.

== History ==
During the Subsequent Nuremberg trials, Walter Paul Schreiber claimed that a biological agents institute had been established in 1943 at Sachsenburg Castle located near Frankenberg in Saxony. The institute was reportedly engaged in the development of plague pathogens as biological agents. This claim was later repeated by numerous authors with no verification, since no further details about the institute were known. Sachsenburg Castle was located in what was then the Soviet occupation zone. For this reason, the experts from the U.S. Alsos Mission, who were analyzing German military activities at the end of the war, did not have access to the facility. Nor did the documents from the archives of Chief Medical Officer Heinrich Kliewe, Germany's leading expert on biological agents, which fell into the hands of the Alsos analysts at the end of the war, contain any evidence of a biological weapons institute at Sachsenburg Castle.

During the 1990s, bioethicist Erhard Geißler of the Max Delbrück Center for Molecular Medicine conducted research on the history of biological warfare on behalf of the Stockholm International Peace Research Institution (SIPRI) with the help of the Volkswagen Foundation. Within the inventory "Federal Health Agency", he stumbled upon documents about the "Institute for Microbiology of the armed forces of Sachsenburg", which had been unnoticed by the Alsos-Mission. According to the documents a secret microbiological institute had been set up in the castle in 1943 where they had also worked with plague pathogens. However, this research was intended for the purpose of vaccine production and, contrary to Schreiber's claims, was not aimed at preparing for offensive bacteriological warfare. Schreiber had lied at the Nuremberg Trials, presumably under Soviet pressure.

== The permanent and original exhibition "The Sachsenburg Castle and Biological Warfare" ==
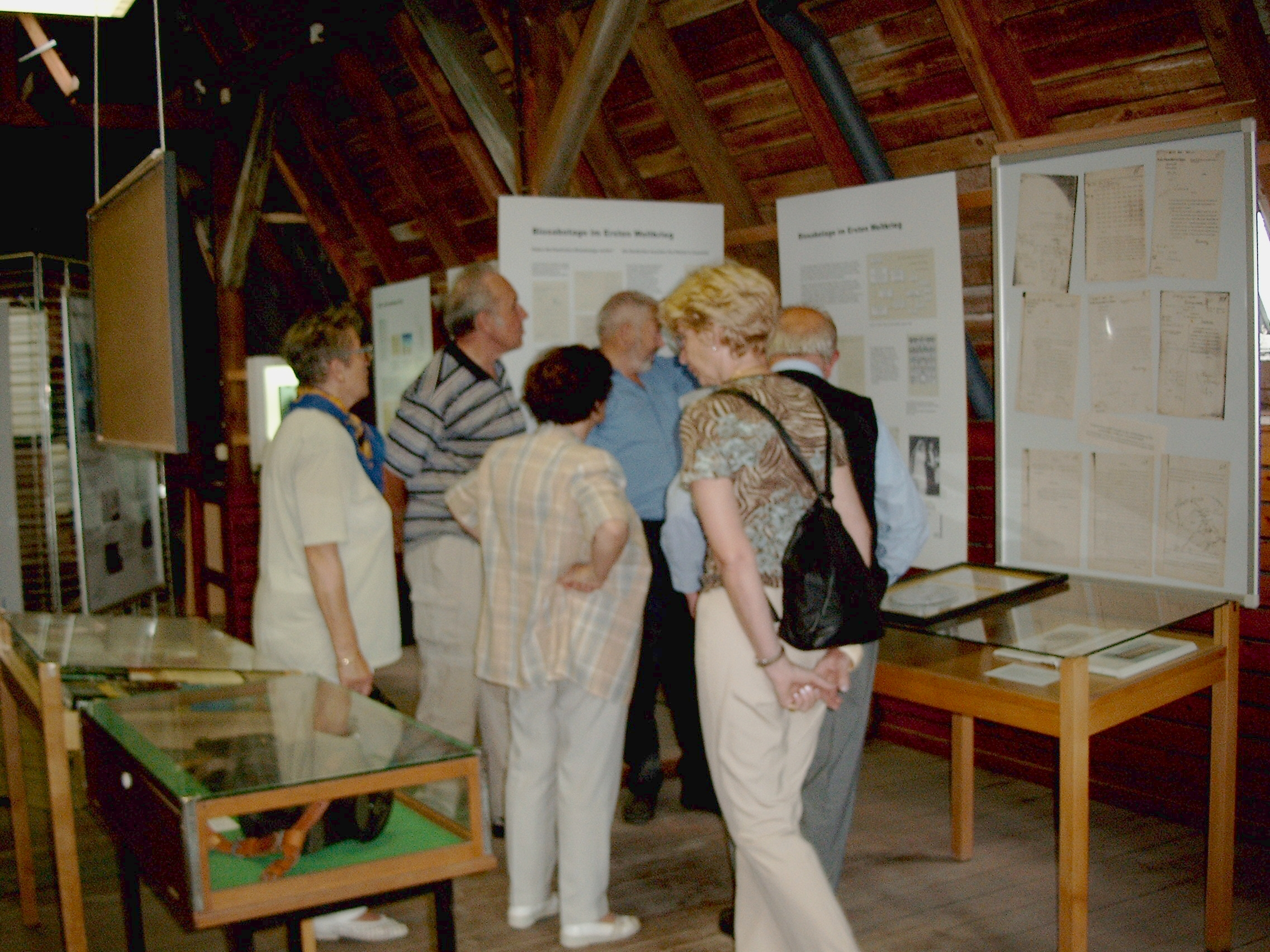
Due to structural deterioration, the original exhibition in Castle Sachsenburg had to be moved to the attic.

In 1994, the discovery of the documents from the "Wehrmacht Institute of Microbiology in Sachsenburg" eliminated the suspicion that Sachsenburg Castle was home to a biological weapons institute. With support from the members of the Frankenberg Historical Association, as well as from Susanne Hahn from the German Hygiene Museum in Dresden, an exhibition called "Sachsenburg and Biological Warfare" was opened in the castle - which already housed an exposition showcasing its history. Contemporary witnesses at the time helped design the exhibition. The sister of Hermann Gildemeister, the late director of the institution, had provided the documents. The institute's former assistant director, Helmut Bauer and SS-SS-Hauptsturmführer, was tracked down and interviewed. Two former employees also agreed to be interviewed, provided letters and journal entries.

The five rooms of the exposition, not only, hosted exhibits concerning the Sachsenburger Institute, but also other pieces related to the topic of biological warfare. Institutions such as the Biochemical science Campus Berlin-Buch, the Max Delbrück Center, the German Hygiene Museum Dresden, the Monterey Institute of International Studies, as well as the Robert Koch Institute provided additional pieces. The Colorado potato beetle was one of the subjects of the exhibition, which claimed that Colorado potato beetles were never actually used against the GDR and that any claims about their use were constructed by East German leadership as propaganda against what they saw as "US-Imperialists". The Federal Biological Research Centre for Agriculture and Foresty in Berlin, the German History Museum and the Museum of Natural History in Berlin supplied exhibits on this subject. The Bertolt Brecht Archive also provided some draft copies of Bertolt Brechts's poem about the "Amikäfer".

After the exhibition rooms at Castle Sachsenburg had to be closed due to structural deterioration, the exhibition was moved to the space under the roof.

Following participation in the competition "Wissenschaft im Dialog" (Science in dialogue) held by the German Science Associations, the exhibition was expanded in 2000, using the 40,000 DM prize money they had been awarded. Since the Max-Delbrück-Centrum for Molecular Medicine contributed a similarly high amount, the exhibition was able to be expanded significantly.

== Travelling exhibition "The Plague and Yankee Beetles" ==
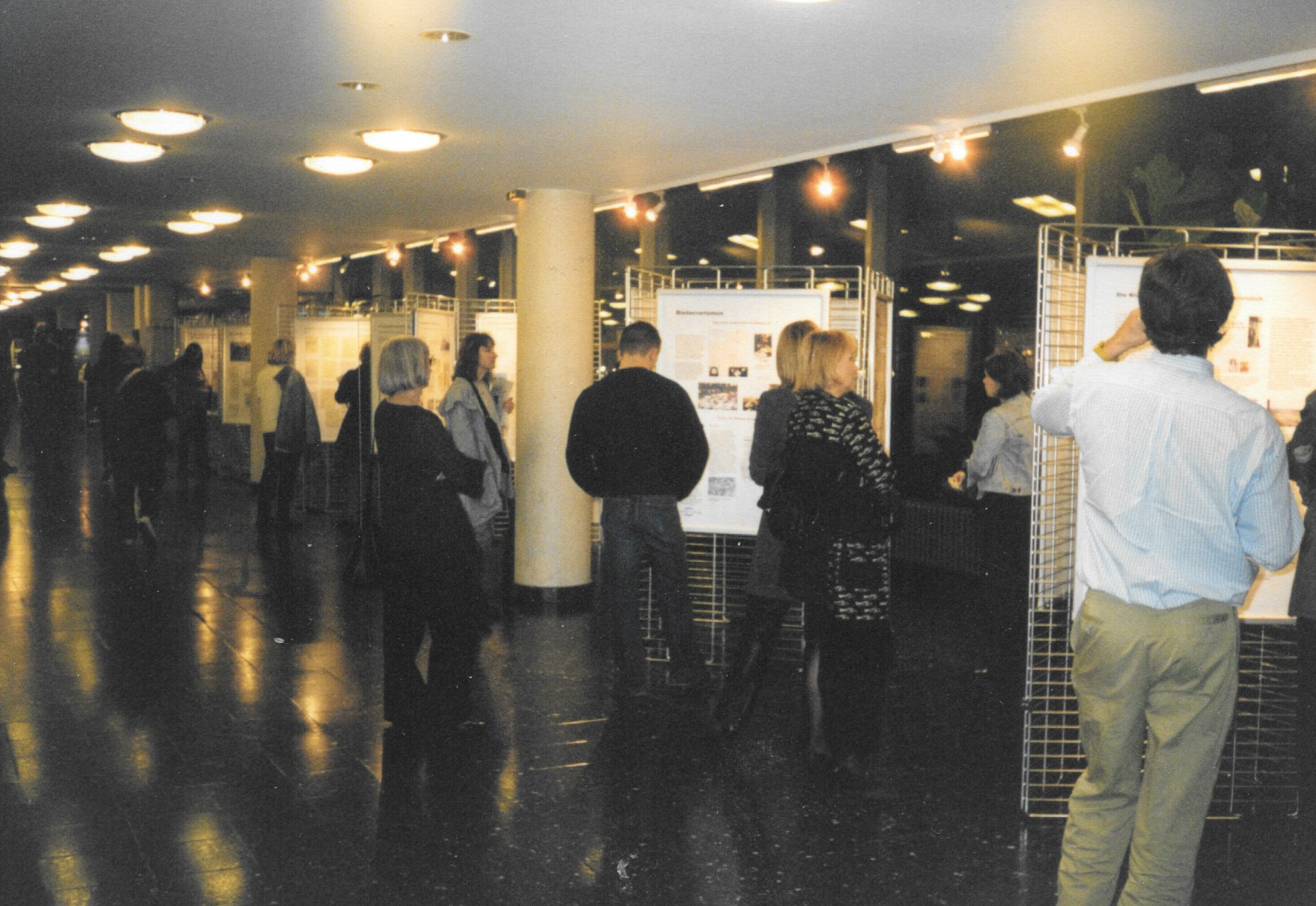
The travelling exhibition at the Urania Berlin in the summer of sciences 2001

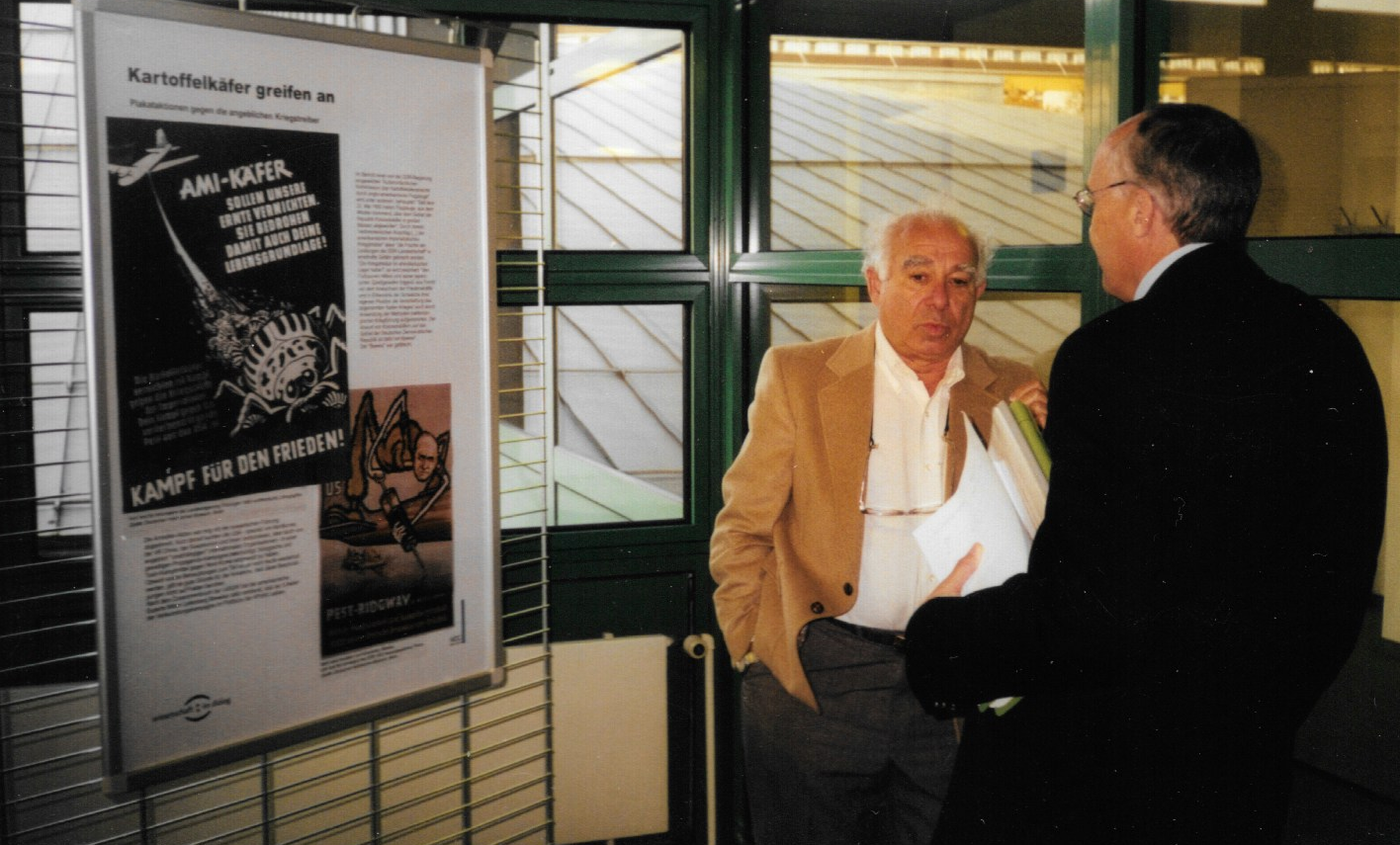
US expert Milton Leitenberg visits the travelling exhibition at the Bundeswehr Medical Academy in Munich, 2001

Building upon the expansion of the stationary exhibition in the year 2000, members of the research group Bioethics from the Max-Delbrück-Centre developed a travelling exhibition. This exhibition, consisting of 30 display panels, was titled "The Plague and Yankee Beetles" and subtitled "Biological Weapons and their History".

The first section examined the most important biological weapons ("the dirty Dozen") on five panels, including the Anthrax pathogen, which was first weaponized in World War 1. The second section detailed "Bio-sabotage in World War 1". The third section consisted of nine panels and numerous other exhibits that dealt with "Biological weaponry before and during World War 2". Among other topics, this section addressed Hitler's ban on the preparation of active biological warfare. Moreover, it covered institutions where offensively and defensively motivated bio-weaponry activities were operated. In the centre of those activities was the "Wehrmacht Institute for Microbiology", which was established in Sachsenburg Castle . On three panels, the fourth section focused on the topic "Bio-terrorism". Six panels and various other objects examined the topic "Attack of the Potato Beetles" in the fifth section. The final section addressed the "control of the bio- and toxin-weaponry" and their realization through international law on three panels.

The traveling exhibit toured Germany for four years and was also on view in Basel, Switzerland. In the year 2000, it was exhibited at the Biohistoricum in Neuburg an der Donau at the suggestion of its founder, medical historian Armin Geus. The exhibition was further shown in the Summer Science Exhibitions 2002 and 2003 at the Urania, Berlin, and the Electoral Palace, Mainz, as part of the initiative "Science in Dialogue" of the "Stifterverband". The Bundeswehr showed an interest and invited the exposition to the Medical Academy Munich, the ABC Defence and Legal Protection Tasks School Sonthofen, and the Military History Museum Dresden. The exposition was also shown at the Max Delbrück Center in Berlin, where it was opened to the public by Walter Stützle, secretary of state of the Federal Ministry of Defence, and Torsten Sohns, commander of the Medical Academy Munich. It was on show and discussed at the Alternative Civilian Service Schools Karlsruhe, Seelbach, and Sondershausen. The exhibition was met with great interest in Erfurt, Hamburg, and also Hilden: as the Stifterverband reported, "during the 'long night of museums' in Erfurt, 30 visitors were still studying the exhibition's boards at 1:30am".

== Reception ==
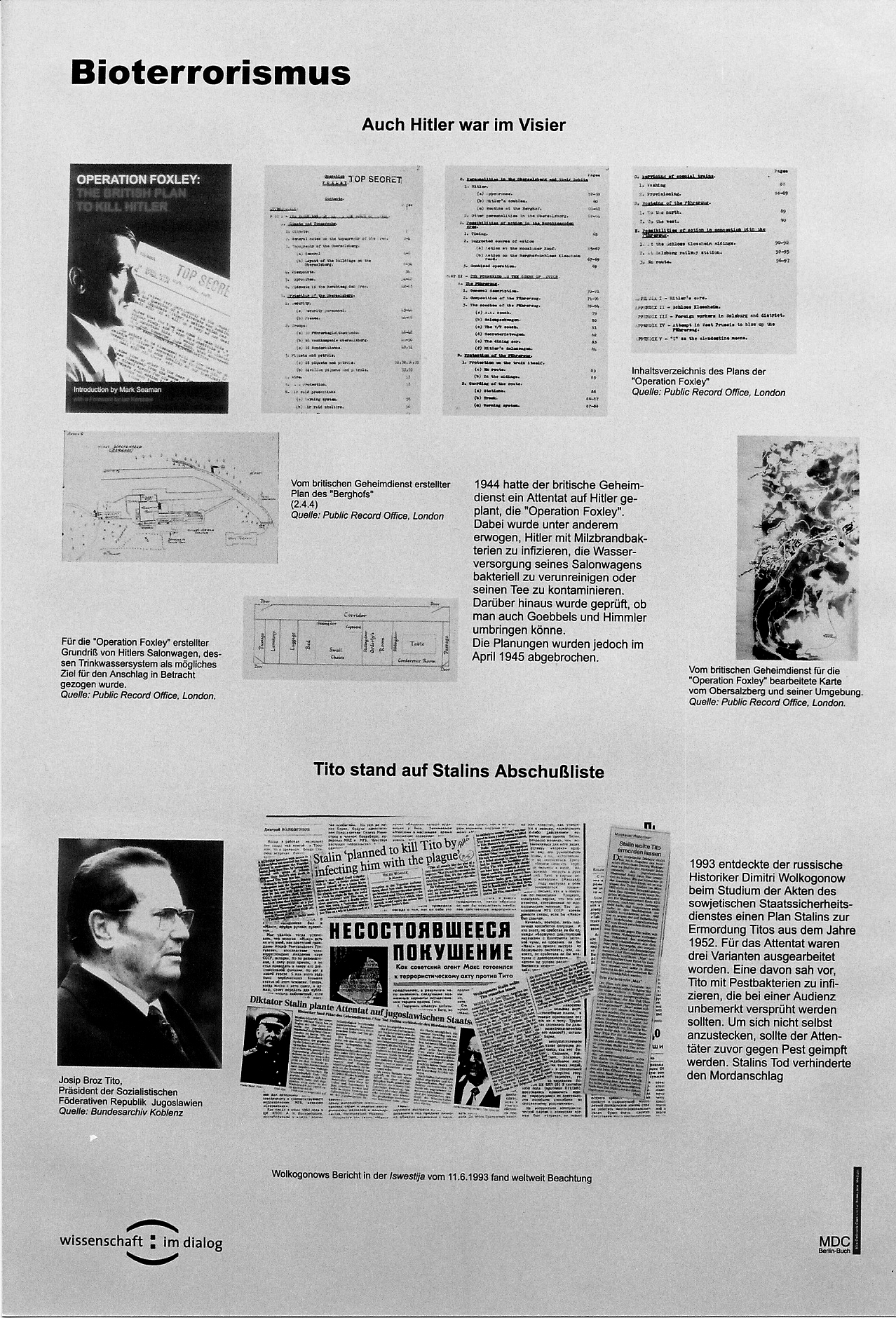
One of the boards on biological terrorism

The traveling exhibit was met with great interest, particularly from the end of 2001, due to the anthrax attacks in the USA following the September 11 attacks. After letters containing anthrax were mailed, fear of acts of bioterrorism spread worldwide. The presence of such letters and subsequent copycat crimes were later also revealed in Germany. From 2005, interest in the exposition ebbed off, mostly due to the fear of bioterrorism (triggered by the anthrax letters) having mostly vanished.
