= Bundeswehr Institute of Microbiology =

Military biodefence unit

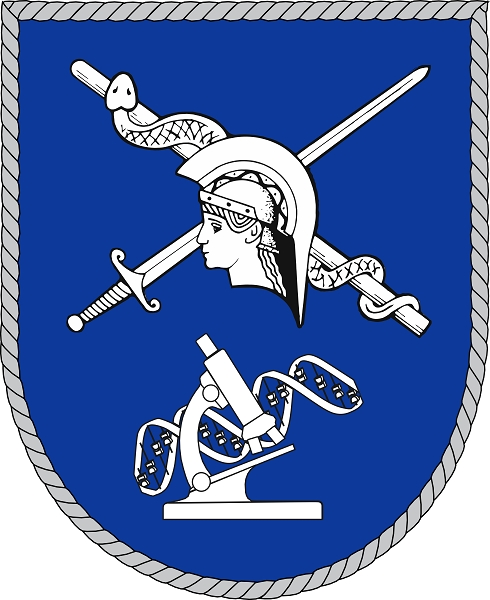
- IMB coat of arms
- Active: 1984–present
- Country: Germany
- Type: Medical CBRN defence institute
- Role: Medical biodefence research and development
- Part of: Bundeswehr biological defense program
- Garrison/HQ: Ernst-von-Bergmann Barracks

Commanders
- Current commander: Colonel Prof. Dr. Roman Wölfel

The Bundeswehr Institute of Microbiology (IMB, military abbreviation InstMikroBioBw) in Munich is the German Armed Forces' scientific competence center in the field of medical defense against biological warfare agents and other dangerous pathogens or biotoxins. The institute provides procedures and methods for the rapid and unambiguous identification and verification of allegations of the use of biological warfare agents, conducts specialized training, and participates in the development of medical biodefense concepts and strategies.

== Tasks ==
- Provide expertise, specialized diagnostic capabilities, principles, concepts, guidelines, and procedures for preserving/restoring the health of populations and individuals exposed to biological warfare agents.
- Deployment of specialized, rapidly deployable military response teams in biological threat situations, investigation of unexplained outbreaks of infectious diseases, and medical verification of biological agent use.
- Research on the epidemiology, epidemic management, pathomechanisms, prevention, diagnostics, and treatment of diseases caused by biological warfare agents.
- Advising the German Ministry of Defense and other federal agencies on scientific and medical issues related to bioweapons disarmament and arms control.

== Directors ==
- 1984–1994: Colonel Dr. med. vet. Ahrens
- 1994–2008: Colonel Dr. med. Ernst-Jürgen Finke
- 2008–2019: Colonel Prof. Dr. med. Lothar Zöller
- Since 2019: Colonel Prof. Dr. med. Roman Wölfel

== History ==
The institute was established in 1966 as the Microbiology Laboratory Group at the Medical Corps School of the Bundeswehr (now: Bundeswehr Medical Academy) in Munich. In 1984, today's Bundeswehr Institute of Microbiology was officially founded as an independent military unit. It has been stationed in the Ernst-von-Bergmann barracks in the north of Munich ever since.

In response to the September 11 attacks in 2001, the German Council of Science and Humanities recommended that the Bundeswehr Institute of Microbiology be developed into a national military competence center for biodefense.

The institute provides medical diagnostics for biological warfare agents and naturally occurring infectious agents of military importance for all members of the Bundeswehr. These services include infectious agents of biological risk groups 3 and 4 and are also available to civilian healthcare facilities. In September 2012, the Central Diagnostic Department (ZBD) of the Institute was flexibly accredited by the German Accreditation Body according to ISO 15189.

In August 2002, along with the Bundeswehr Institute of Radiobiology and the Bundeswehr Institute of Pharmacology and Toxicology, the institute became an independent entity under the Central Medical Service of the Bundeswehr and was placed under the supervision of the Bundeswehr Medical Office. Since 2012, all three institutes have once again been under the military command of the Medical Academy, but now as independent military units at battalion level.

Since 2010, the institute, together with the Technical University of Munich, LMU Munich, and the Helmholtz Zentrum München, forms the partner site in Munich of the German Center for Infection Research (DZIF). In February 2013, the cooperation with the Institute of Microbiology, Immunology, and Hygiene and the Institute of Virology of the Technical University of Munich began. In 2016, a cooperation agreement was signed with the University of Stuttgart-Hohenheim.

Since 2009, the Medical Biodefense Conference has been organized in the format of an international conference.

Since 2007, the Bundeswehr Institute for Microbiology has been leading the development of a modular and rapidly deployable mobile laboratory system for the German Armed Forces. Featuring adaptable configurations and cutting-edge biosafety measures, the institute's mobile lab systems are designed to respond quickly to sudden disease outbreaks across diverse environments. The incorporation of a collapsible glove box with sturdy polycarbonate walls ensures a secure working environment for handling highly infectious samples. Leveraging diagnostic technologies like qPCR, ELISA, and NGS, the system aims for expeditious turnaround times in sample analysis. Following initial deployments in the Balkans, the mobile laboratory seamlessly integrated into the European Mobile Lab Project (EMLab) from 2013. These systems played a pivotal role during the 2014 Ebola outbreak in West Africa and are now acknowledged as a global technical standard for diagnostic field operations in combating disease outbreaks.

The Bundeswehr Institute of Microbiology reached a significant milestone during the COVID-19 pandemic. On January 27, 2020, researchers at the institute diagnosed the first cases of illness caused by the SARS-CoV-2 virus in Germany, marking a pivotal early detection in the laboratory. Notably, the institute successfully cultured the virus in cell cultures, achieving a feat previously only accomplished by Australian researchers outside of China. Furthermore, the research group sequenced the genome of SARS-CoV-2, providing comprehensive insights beyond the partial information available from Chinese online transmissions. The institute offered the initial description of the replication of SARS-CoV-2 in the nasal and throat cavity and the excretion of the virus in the stool.

On May 19, 2022, amidst the largest outbreak of mpox in Europe to date, the Bundeswehr Institute of Microbiology confirmed the first case of mpox in Germany.
