= Romanus =

Romanus (Latin for "Roman"), hellenized as Romanos (Ῥωμανός) was a Roman cognomen and may refer to:

== People ==
- Adrianus Romanus, Flemish mathematician (1561–1615)
- Aquila Romanus, Latin grammarian
- Franz Conrad Romanus (1671-1746), Mayor of Leipzig
- Giles of Rome, Aegidius Romanus, medieval philosopher
- Gabriel Romanus (born 1939), Swedish politician
- Pope John XIX, whose given name was Romanus
- Pope Romanus
- Richard Romanus (1943-2023), American actor and writer
- Romanus (bishop of Rochester)
- Romanus (exarch), Exarch of Ravenna
- The hypothetical Petrus Romanus, a figure mentioned in the Prophecy of the Popes
- Sven Romanus (1906–2005), Swedish civil servant

=== Saints ===
- Romanus of Nepi, Bishop and martyr of Nepi (1st century), feast day 24 August
- Romanus Ostiarius, (died c. 258), feast day August 9
- Romanus of Caesarea, Martyr (c. 303), feast day November 18
- Romanus of Blaye (fl. 4th – 5th century), feast day November 24
- Romanus of Condat, Abbot, Hermit (c. 460), feast day February 28
- Romanus of Subiaco, Monk, (c. 550), feast day May 22
- Romanos the Melodist, (c. 556), feast day October 1
- Romanus of Rouen, Bishop, (c. 640), feast day October 23

=== Byzantine emperors ===
- Romanos I Lekapenos, ruled 920–944
- Romanos II, ruled 959–963
- Romanos III Argyros, ruled 1028–1034
- Romanos IV Diogenes, ruled 1068–1071

== Places ==
- Romanus House, Palace in Baroque style in Leipzig
- Romanos, Aragon, a municipality in Aragon, Spain
- Romanos, Ioannina, a village in the municipal unit of Lakka Souliou, Greece
- Romanos, Messenia, a village in Messenia, Greece

== See also ==
- Roman (disambiguation)
- Romana (disambiguation)
- Romano (disambiguation)
- Romanos (disambiguation)
