= Romanenkov =

Romanenko (Ukrainian: Романенко, feminine: Romanenkova) is a Ukrainian patronymic surname derived from the first name Roman. Notable people with the surname include:

- Oksana Romanenkova
- Vasily Romanenkov
- Viktor Romanenkov

== See also ==
- Romaniuk
- Romanenko
- Romanov
