= Romanik =

Romanik is a Polish surname. Notable people with the surname include:

- Jerzy Romanik (1931–2016), Polish miner and Communist functionary
- Radosław Romanik, Polish former professional road cyclist
- Steve Romanik, American football player

== See also ==
- Romaniuk, Romaniak
