= Erika Franke =

Major General and physician of the German Army

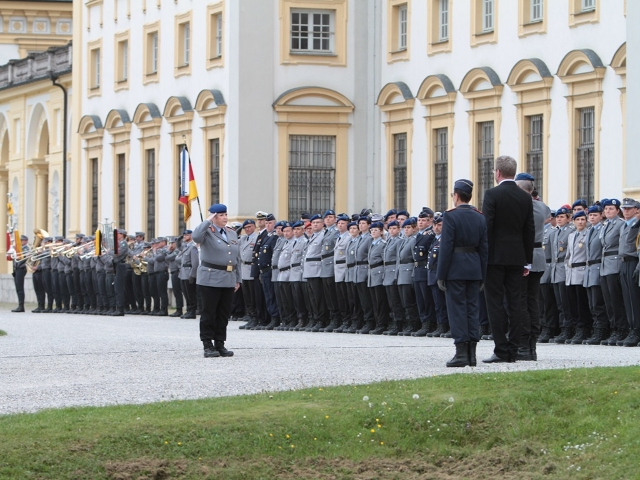
- Born: May 8, 1954 (age 71); East Berlin
- Education: Humboldt University of Berlin (MD)
- Occupation: Physician
- Employer: Bundeswehr
- Awards: Bavarian Order of Merit

Erika Franke (b. May 8, 1954) is a German military doctor and general staff doctor who served in the Bundeswehr, the German military forces, for twenty-six years, until her retirement in 2016. Franke was the first woman in the Bundeswehr to reach the rank of two-star general, the second to become a general, and the first woman from former East Germany to attain that rank. She headed the Bundeswehr Medical Academy for three years.

Franke was born in East Berlin and grew up in the German Democratic Republic. Franke realized she wanted to be a doctor early in life, and would clean volunteer clinics during her school breaks. After receiving her Abitur, Franke studied at Humboldt University in Berlin, becoming a doctor in 1978. She would go on to receive a doctorate in microbiology and epidemiology in 1985.

Beginning in 1978, when she became a doctor, Franke worked in the People's Police Hospital in East Berlin, where she was eventually promoted to head doctor. After the reunification of Germany in 1990, the hospital was taken over by the Bundeswehr,, which Franke joined as a medical officer. Following this, Franke led Laboratory Department I in the Central Institute of the Medical Service of the Bundeswehr until 2001. She deployed twice overseas, to Bosnia and Herzegovina in 1997 and Kosovo from 2000-2001. In 2006, Franke was promoted to the rank of general in the Bundeswehr and became the head doctor of the Bundeswehr hospital in Ulm. Three years later, in 2009, Franke began working at the medical office in Munich. In 2013, she was promoted again, to the rank of two-star general, making her the highest ranking female German soldier in the history of the Bundeswehr, a position in which she commanded more than 300 soldiers. In concert with this promotion, Franke was given command of the Bundeswehr Medical Academy, a position she held until her retirement three years later.

In her personal life, Franke married and had two children. She remains well known in German military circles, and has been recognized for her service since her retirement.
