= Romana (name) =

Romana is a surname and female given name.

Its roots are originally from the Assyrian/Syriac Roma ('above') and na ('one'), and later from the feminine form of the Latin name Romanus ('Roman'). One possible pronunciation of Romana in English is /rɔːˈmɑːnə/.

== Name days ==
- Czech: 18 November
- Slovak: 23 February
- Polish: 23 February
- German: 23 February or 9 August
- Hungarian: 23 February or 22 May

== People with the given name ==
- Romana Acosta Bañuelos (1925–2018), Mexican American businesswoman and politician
- Romana Bashir, Pakistani activist
- Romana Calligaris (1924–2002), Italian freestyle swimmer
- Romana Carén (born 1979), Austrian actress and director
- Romana Chrenková (born 1987), Czech handball player
- Romana D'Annunzio (born 1972), Scottish television presenter
- Romana Didulo, Canadian false pretender and conspiracy theorist
- Romana Dubnová (born 1978), Czech high jumper
- Romana Graham (born 1986), New Zealand rugby union footballer
- Romana Hamzová (born 1970), Czech basketball player
- Romana Hejdová (born 1988), Czech basketball player
- Romana Jalil, Pakistani politician
- Romana Javitz (1903–1980), American artist and librarian
- Romana Jerković (born 1964), Croatian politician
- Romana Jordan Cizelj (born 1966), Slovene politician
- Romana Kryzanowska (1923–2013), American Pilates student
- Romana Maláčová (born 1987), Czech athlete
- Romana Labounková (born 1989), Czech racing cyclist
- Romana Schlesinger (born 1986), Slovak LGBT rights activist
- Romana Schuring (born 1995), Dutch gymnast
- Romana Tabak (born 1991), Slovak tennis player and politician
- Romana Tedjakusuma (born 1976), Indonesian tennis player
- Romana Župan (born 1987), Croatian sports sailor

== People with the surname ==
- Chito Santa Romana (1948–2022), Philippine journalist and diplomat
- Dimples Romana (born 1984), Filipina actress and model

== Fictional characters ==
- Romana (Doctor Who), a character from the British SF series Doctor Who

== See also ==
- Romana (disambiguation)
- Romanus (disambiguation)
- Romane, French name
- Romaña, a Spanish-language surname
