= Wojciech Rodek =

Polish conductor

Wojciech Rodek is a Polish conductor. He is artistic director of the Lublin Philharmonic in Lublin.

== Biography ==
Rodek was born in 1977 in Brzeg, Poland. He began studying piano at the age of 8. Rodek studied conducting from 1998 to 2003 at the Music Academy in Wrocław, Poland.

In 2005, he won the competition for the position of Assistant Conductor of the National Philharmonic Orchestra in Warsaw. Since then, he has worked with the National Philharmonic Orchestra, the Polish National Radio Symphony Orchestra in Katowice, and the Sinfonia Varsovia.

He is a regular guest conductor, conducting opera orchestras in major concert halls of Europe.

In December, 2011, Wojciech Rodek was appointed artistic director of the Lublin Philharmonic. "Rodek is one of two or three most talented conductors of the younger generation" said John Sek, chief executive of the Philharmonic.

== Discography ==
- Rodek conducts the Sinfonia Varsovia in a recording of Cello Concerto No. 1, Op. 107 in E-flat major by Dmitry Shostakovich, Cello Heroics II: Shostakovich, featuring Gavriel Lipkind, cello
- Rodek conducts the Warsaw Philharmonic Symphony Orchestra and Choir in a 2008 recording of the Seventh Symphony of Ángel Illarramendi, with Elena Panasyunk, soprano

== Cinema ==
Rodek is credited as conductor for:

- Get Low (2009), starring Robert Duvall, Bill Murray and Sissy Spacek
- City Island (2009), starring Andy Garcia, Julianna Margulies and Steven Strait
