= Roman Woelfel =

German physician, virologist and Bundeswehr colonel

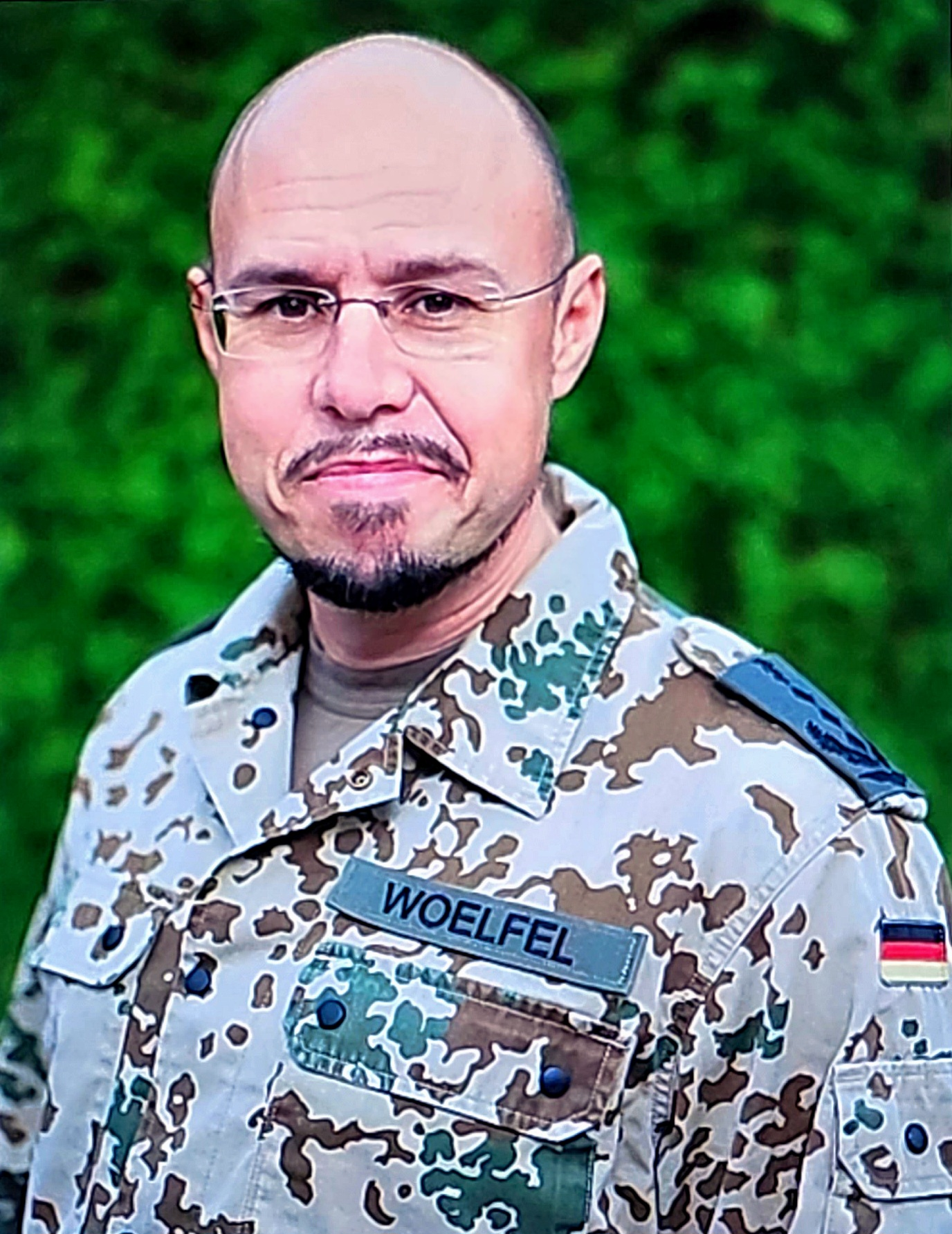
- Roman Wölfel (2022)
- Born: March 3, 1974 (age 52)
- Education: Philipps University of Marburg
- Scientific career
- Fields: Virology
- Workplaces: Technical University of Munich

Roman Wölfel [roˈmaːn ˈvœlfl̩] (born on March 3, 1974. in Frankfurt am Main) is a German physician and medical officer in the rank of Colonel (OF-5) in the German Armed Forces (Bundeswehr). Since October 2019, he is the director of the Bundeswehr Institute of Microbiology (IMB, German: Institut für Mikrobiologie der Bundeswehr) in Munich and since 2021 a professor at the Technical University of Munich (TUM).

== Life and Military Career ==
=== Education and first assignments ===
In 1993, Roman Wölfel joined the German Armed Forces as a medical officer candidate at the German Air Force Medical School in Giebelstadt. He completed the medical officer training and pursued his studies in Medicine at the Faculty of Medicine of the Philipps University of Marburg. He graduated in 2000 from the Justus Liebig University Giessen and served as a resident at the Bundeswehr Hospital Hamburg. In the same year, Wölfel obtained his medical doctorate. From 2002 to 2003, he served as a battalion surgeon and squadron leader in the Air Force Medical Squadron of 26th Air defense missile group in Husum, Northern Germany.

=== Service as Staff Officer ===
From 2003, Wölfel worked as a research associate at the Bundeswehr Institute of Microbiology followed by training in the BSL-4 high-containment laboratory of the Bernhard Nocht Institute for Tropical Medicine in Hamburg and a research stay at the Institute for Microbiology, Immunology, and Hygiene of the Technical University of Munich. Since 2007, he is a consultant medical microbiologist and virologist.

From 2008 to 2014, Wölfel led the Department of Medical Biological Reconnaissance and Verification at the Bundeswehr Institute of Microbiology. This involved establishing mobile laboratory capabilities for investigating dangerous infectious diseases. In 2013, these capabilities were deployed as the first international WHO team in the Ebola outbreak in West Africa.

After serving as the head of Bacteriology & Toxinology at the Institute for Microbiology of the Bundeswehr, he moved from 2016 to 2019 as the head of the Operations Management and Operations Concept Department and head of the CBRN Medical Task Force to the Bundeswehr Medical Academy.

Since 2019, he has been the director of the Bundeswehr Institute of Microbiology and was appointed as an adjunct professor at the Technical University of Munich, School of Medicine and Health in 2021.

Wölfel is an advisor to the German Ministry of Defense for the implementation and further development of the Biological Weapons Convention. He is also a member of the Health-Security Interface Technical Advisory Group (HSI-TAG) of the World Health Organization.

=== Medical specializations ===
Wölfel holds the following medical specialties and additional qualifications: Medical Specialist in Microbiology, Virology, and Infection Epidemiology, Diploma in Tropical Medicine and Parasitology, Additional Qualification: Medical Quality Management, Military Emergency Physician.

=== International Deployments ===
- 2002/2003: Emergency physician in the MedEvac Company in the German Contingent SFOR, Field Camp Rajlovac and FOB Filipovići near Foča.

=== Awards ===
- 2003: Bundeswehr Foreign Duty Medal Bronze SFOR Bosnia and Herzegovina
- 2003: NATO Service Medal for the Balkans
- 2005: Hans-Hartwig-Clasen Award from the German Society for Military Medicine and Military Pharmacy
- 2006: Paul Schürmann Award from the German Society for Military Medicine and Military Pharmacy
- 2011: Cross of Honour of the Bundeswehr in Silver
- 2020: Cross of Honour of the Bundeswehr in Gold

== Research ==
Wölfel's research and research groups focus on Emerging and Re-Emerging Viruses (e.g., Ebola Virus, Lassa virus, or Crimean-Congo Hemorrhagic Fever Virus). Additionally, they investigate rare bacterial infections (Typhus, and other Rickettsiae). A focus lies on the development of molecular biological detection and identification formats and rapidly deployable laboratory equipment for field use. Research groups led by Wölfel conduct training and support projects in countries such as Georgia, Mali, Mauritania, Chad, Niger, Burkina Faso, Tunisia, Ukraine, and Uzbekistan. In 2015, Wölfel completed his habilitation in microbiology, virology, and infection epidemiology at the University of Leipzig with the thesis "Molecular Biological Investigations on the Detection of Biological Warfare Agents".

=== Mobile Field Laboratories ===
From 2007, Wölfel developed a modular and rapidly deployable mobile laboratory system for the German Armed Forces. It was designed for a swift response to sudden disease outbreaks and includes flexible configurations and innovative biosafety measures. The system utilizes a foldable glovebox with rigid polycarbonate walls to ensure a safe working environment when handling highly infectious samples. It employs various diagnostic technologies such as qPCR, ELISA, and NGS, aiming for rapid turnaround times for sample analysis. With minimal infrastructure requirements, the system can be rapidly deployed worldwide and used in various environments. After initial deployments in the Balkans, the mobile laboratory was integrated into the European Mobile Lab Project (EMLab) from 2013. Several of these systems were deployed during the 2014 Ebola outbreak in West Africa and are now considered a global technical standard for diagnostic field operations in combating disease outbreaks.

=== COVID-19 Pandemic ===
A research group led by Wölfel diagnosed the first cases of illness caused by the SARS-CoV-2 virus in Germany on January 27, 2020, in the laboratory. The cases were among employees of the company Webasto. Wölfel's group succeeded in culturing the virus in cell cultures. Outside of China, this had previously only been achieved by Australian researchers. The research group also sequenced the genome of SARS-CoV-2, which was previously only partially known from Chinese online transmissions. In the publication of the research results, Wölfel, along with Christian Drosten, first described the replication of SARS-CoV-2 in the nasal and throat cavity and the excretion of the virus in the stool.

=== Mpox ===
During the largest outbreak of mpox in Europe to date, on May 19, 2022, the first German case of mpox was confirmed by one of Wölfel's research groups. The mpox virus was diagnosed in a patient with characteristic skin lesions using PCR and cell culture. Mpox virus was detected in blood and, for the first time, in semen

== Publications ==
- Publications by Roman Wölfel in the PubMed literature database
- Publications by Roman Wölfel at Google Scholar
- Bundeswehr Institute of Microbiology website, incl CV
