= Rodman =

Rodman may refer to:

== Places in the United States ==
- Rodman, Iowa
- Rodman, New York, a town
  - Rodman (CDP), New York, a hamlet in the town
- Rodman Mountains, California
- Rodman Reservoir, Florida

== People ==
=== Surname ===
- Alex Rodman (born 1987), English footballer
- Arabella Page Rodman (1867-1955) American civic leader, travel writer
- Blair Rodman (born 1954), American professional poker player
- David Rodman (born 1983), Slovenian ice hockey player
- Dennis Rodman (born 1961), former NBA basketball player
- DJ Rodman (born 2001), American basketball player and son of Dennis Rodman
- Hugh Rodman (1859–1940), American admiral
- Howard A. Rodman (fl. 1990s–2020s), American screenwriter, author and professor
- Isaac P. Rodman (1822–1862), American Civil War Union brigadier general
- John Rodman (1775–1847), New York County District Attorney
- Judy Rodman (born 1951), American country music singer
- Marcel Rodman (born 1981), Slovenian ice hockey player
- Peter W. Rodman (1943-2008), Brookings Institution Senior Fellow
- Peter S. Rodman (born 1945), primatologist at UC Davis
- Samuel Rodman (spy) (1898-?), Soviet WW II spy
- Thomas Jackson Rodman (1816–1871), Union general
- Trinity Rodman (born 2002), American soccer player and daughter of Dennis Rodman
- William Rodman (Pennsylvania politician) (1757–1824), member of the U.S. House of Representatives from Pennsylvania
- William B. Rodman (1817–1893), lawyer, North Carolina Supreme Court judge
- William B. Rodman Jr. (1889–1976), North Carolina state Senator, state Attorney General, and state Supreme Court judge
- William M. Rodman (1814–1868), tailor and 7th mayor of Providence, Rhode Island

=== First name ===
- Rodman Flender (born 1962), American actor, writer, director and producer
- Rodman Philbrick (born 1951), American writer
- Rodman M. Price (1816–1894), American politician, Governor of New Jersey
- Rodman Rockefeller (1932–2000), American businessman, eldest son of Nelson Rockefeller
- Rodman "Rod" Serling (1924–1975), American television host
- Rodman Wanamaker (1863–1928), American businessman

== Other ==
- Rodman gun, American Civil War cannon
- USS Rodman (DD-456), American destroyer named after Admiral Hugh Rodman
- Surveyor's assistant who handles the Level staff

== See also ==
- Justice Rodman (disambiguation)
