= Michael Romanov (disambiguation) =

Michael Romanov or Michael of Russia (1596–1645) was the first Russian Tsar of the house of Romanov. He is Tsar Mikhail I

Michael Romanov may also refer to:

- Grand Duke Michael Pavlovich of Russia (1798–1849)
- Grand Duke Michael Nikolaevich of Russia (1831–1909)
- Grand Duke Michael Mikhailovich of Russia (1861–1929)
- Michael de Torby (1898–1959), morganatic son of the above
- Prince Michael Andreevich of Russia (1920–2008)
- Prince Michael Feodorovich of Russia (1924–2008)
- Mikhail Alexandrovich Romanov (1878–1918), arguably Tsar Mikhail II for one day after the abdication of Nicholas II
- Mikhail Romanov (footballer) (1895–1961), Russian international footballer
- Michael Romanoff (1890–1971), owner of Romanoff's restaurant in Los Angeles
- Mikhail Timofeyevich Romanov (1891–1941), Red Army major general
- Mikhail Romanov (politician) (born 1989), Russian politician
