= Romana =

Romana or Română may refer to:

== People ==
- Romana (name), a feminine given name, including a list of people with the name
- Romana (singer) (Romana Panić, born 1975), a Serbian pop singer
- Romaña, a Spanish-language surname, including a list of people with the name
- Romaña (guerrilla leader), Colombian guerrilla leader

== Places ==
- Romana, Azerbaijan
- Romana, Sardinia, Italy
- Româna, Balş, Olt County, Romania

== Other uses ==
- Romana (Jordanes), a 6th-century history book
- Română, the Romanian language, which calls itself limba română
- Romana (Doctor Who), fictional character in the TV series
- Romana FC, a former Dominican Republic football team
- Romana Film, an Italian film production company

== See also ==
- La Romana (disambiguation)
- Pax Romana (disambiguation)
- Roma (disambiguation)
- Romaña's sign, a sign of Chagas disease
- Romane, a name
