= La Romana =

La Romana may refer to:

- La Romana Province, Dominican Republic
  - La Romana, Dominican Republic, capital city of the province
  - La Romana International Airport
  - La Romana Men (volleyball club)
  - La Romana Women, volleyball club
- La Romana, Alicante, a village in Valencia, Spain
- Pedro Caro, 3rd Marquis of la Romana (1761–1811), Spanish general of the Peninsular War
  - Diego del Alcázar, 10th Marquis of la Romana (born 1950), Spanish entrepreneur
- The Woman of Rome (Italian: La Romana), a novel by Alberto Moravia
- "La Romana" (song), by Bad Bunny, 2018

== See also ==
- Romana (disambiguation)
- Evacuation of La Romana's division, a military operation in 1808
