= Romaniuk =

Romaniuk or Romanyuk (Ukrainian: Романюк) is a Ukrainian-language patronymic surname derived from the given name Roman. It may refer to:

- Greg Romaniuk (born 1971), Canadian-American curler
- Kazimierz Romaniuk (1927–2025), Polish Catholic bishop
- Kyrylo Romanyuk (born 2001), Ukrainian footballer
- Roman Romanyuk (born 1961), Ukrainian politician
- Russ Romaniuk (born 1970), Canadian ice hockey player
- Serhii Romaniuk (born 1995), Ukrainian Paralympic Nordic skier
- Vitaliy Romanyuk (born 1984), Ukrainian footballer
- Volodymyr Romaniuk (1923–1995), Ukrainian Eastern Orthodox priest and human rights activist, Patriarch of the Ukrainian Orthodox Church – Kiev Patriarchate
- Wojciech Romaniuk (born 1970), Polish politician
- Yuriy Romanyuk (born 1997), Ukrainian footballer

== In other languages ==
- Enzo Joaquín Sosa Romañuk
- Maria Romanjuk, Estonian swimmer
- Paul Romanuk, Canadian sportscaster and writer

== See also ==
- Romanov
- Romanenko
- Romanenkov
