= Romanos =

Romanos may refer to:

- Romanos, Aragon, a municipality in the province of Zaragoza, in Aragon.
- Romanos the Melodist, early medieval Greek poet and saint
- Romanos I Lekapenos (870–948), Byzantine Emperor from 920 to 944
- Romanos II (938–963), Byzantine Emperor from 959–963)
- Romanos III Argyros (968–1034), Byzantine emperor from 1028 to 1034
- Romanos IV Diogenes (c. 1030 – 1072), Byzantine emperor who reigned from 1068 to 1071
- Romanos Kourkouas, Byzantine aristocrat and senior military leader of the mid-10th century
- Romanos Melikian (1883–1935), Armenian composer

== See also ==
- Romano (disambiguation)
- Romanus (disambiguation), hellenized as Romanos, the name of several people
