= Romāns (given name) =

Male given name

- Gender: Male
- Name day: 4 August

Origin
- Origin: Late Latin
- Meaning: Roman
- Region of origin: Latvia

Other names
- Related names: Roman

Romāns is a Latvian masculine given name derived from the Late Latin name Romanus meaning "Roman". Individuals bearing the name Romāns include:

- Romāns Apsītis (1939–2022), Latvian jurist and politician, former Minister of Justice
- Romāns Kukļins (born 1974), Latvian boxer
- Romāns Kvačovs (born 1980), Latvian football manager
- Romāns Miloslavskis (born 1983), Latvian swimmer and politician
- Romāns Vainšteins (born 1973), Latvian road bicycle racer
