= Ernst-von-Bergmann-Kaserne =

Military facility in Munich, Germany

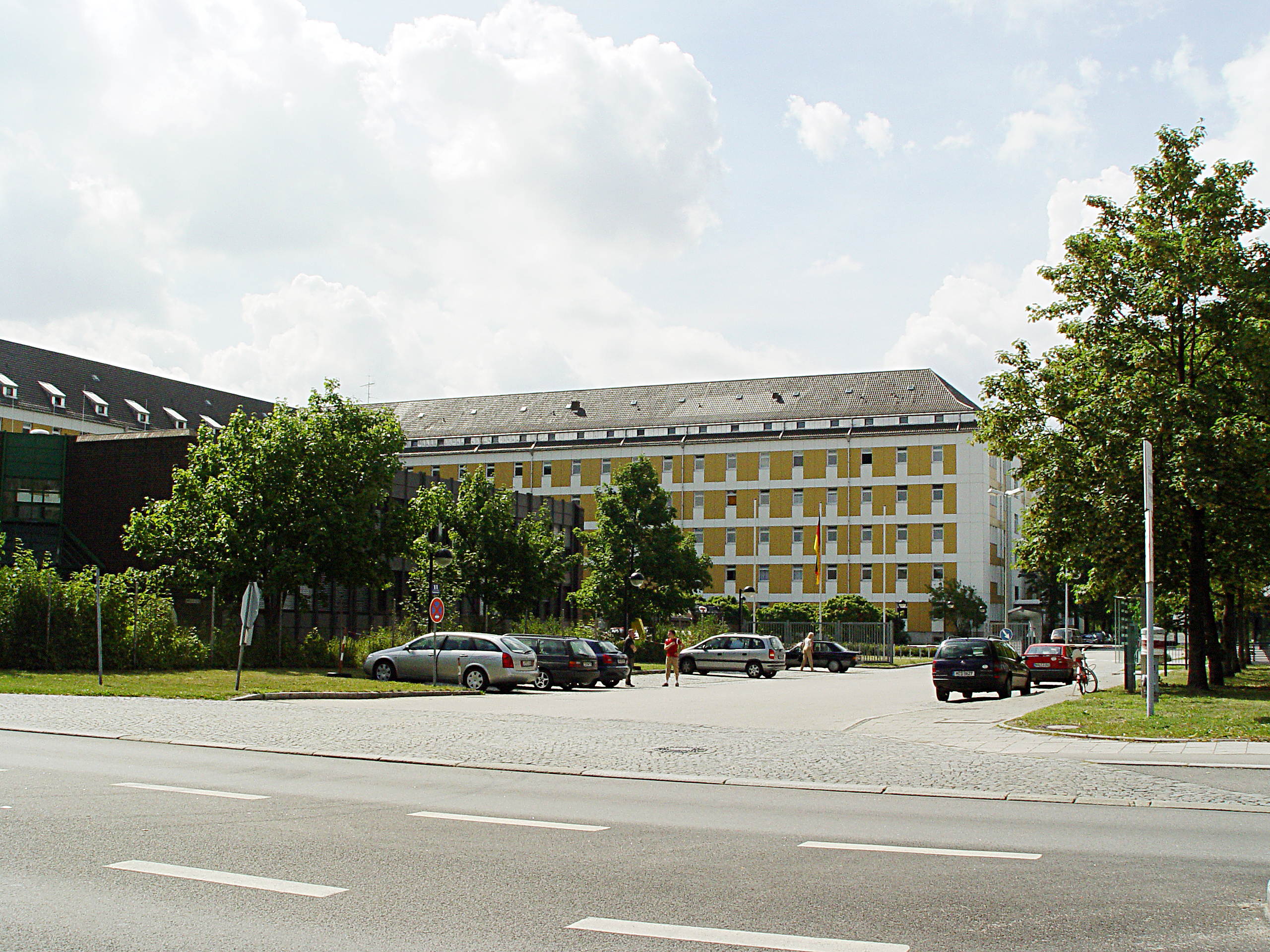
- Today's main entrance at Neuherbergstraße

Site information
- Type: Military Garrison

Location
- Coordinates: 48°12′36″N 11°34′53″E

Site history
- Built: 1934 - 1936
- In use: SS-Standarte 1 "Deutschland" 1938-1945 as Kaserne München-Freimann; United Nations Relief and Rehabilitation Administration ca. 1945-1950; 24. US Infantry Division and other US-Units 1950-1968 as Warner-Kaserne; Bundeswehr Medical Academy, predecessor and other Bundeswehr units 1968-Current as Ernst-von-Bergmann-Kaserne

The Ernst-von-Bergmann-Kaserne, before called Warner Kaserne by the US Army (1950–1968), is a military facility in Munich, Germany, which was built by the architect Oswald Bieber between 1934 and 1936. The current name was given in honor of professor Ernst von Bergmann.

== History ==
The original name of the barracks was Kaserne "München-Freimann". Until the end of World War II the barracks were primarily used by the SS-Standarte 1 "Deutschland". After the war the UNRRA used the buildings as a displaced persons camp.

When the barracks were acquired by the U.S. Army in 1950, they were renamed to Warner Kaserne. The huge main building (earlier on number 1701; today number 1) was the second largest after the Pentagon, which was used by the U.S. Army.

After the U.S. Army returned the barracks to the Bundeswehr in 1968 it was rebuilt from 1973 to 1980. Since 1980 the main user has been the Bundeswehr Medical Academy.

Disbanded users were the Medical Instruction Battalion 851, the Reserve Hospital Group 7609 and a specialist outpatient clinic of the former Military Hospital Amberg, as well as the recruitment center for southern Germany "Zentrum für Nachwuchsgewinnung Süd".

The Bundeswehr Institute of Radiobiology, the Bundeswehr Institute of Microbiology and the Bundeswehr Institute of Pharmacology and Toxicology have also been stationed in the barracks since they were founded as independent military units.

== See also ==
- List of barracks in Munich
