= Gavriel Lipkind =

Israeli musical artist

Gavriel Lipkind גבריאל ליפקינד
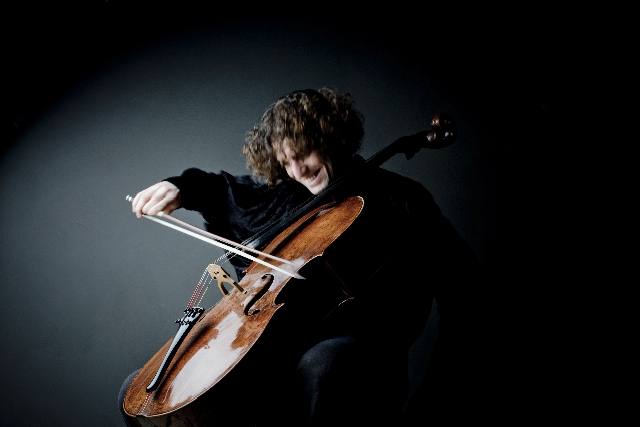
- Lipkind plays the Zihrhonheimer cello in 2008

Background information
- Born: 1977 (age 48–49); Tel Aviv, Israel
- Genres: classical music
- Instrument: cello
- Years active: 1994–present
- Website: Gavriel Lipkind Cellist

Gavriel Lipkind (Hebrew: גבריאל ליפקינד; born 1977) is an Israeli classical cellist based in The Netherlands. Lipkind made his radio debut performance aged eight, left Israel at an age of about 18, and received degrees from three music colleges. He won awards in music competitions and performed with orchestras until 2002, when he took time off from touring for three years to study music and revise his repertoire. Lipkind released two albums in 2006 and tours solo and with the Lipkind-Quartet.

== Early life and career ==
Gavriel Lipkind was born in 1977 in Tel Aviv as the second child of an academic family that had emigrated from Russia. He began to play cello at the age of six, made his radio performance debut at the age of eight, and studied at the S. Rubin Music Academy of Tel Aviv University under classical musician Uzi Wiesel. Lipkind left Israel aged almost 18 and had his military service waived. He graduated from the Tel Aviv University, the Frankfurt University of Music and Performing Arts, and the New England Conservatory. Lipkind has received awards at the 1994 Rostropovich International Cello Competition in Paris, the 1997 Leonard Rose International Cello Competition in Washington, D.C., and the ARD International Music Competition in Munich. He worked with Gidon Kremer, Yuri Bashmet, Pinchas Zukerman, and Yehudi Menuhin, performed in broadcasting, and played as a soloist with the Israel Philharmonic Orchestra, the Munich Philharmonic, and the Baltimore Symphony Orchestra.

In 2002, Lipkind received two special prizes at the Grand Prix Emanuel Feuermann competition in Berlin and decided to take time off performing to reassess his musical motivations. During this time, which would last three years, he made musicological studies, recordings, and revised his repertoire, and was included in a German documentary, The Solitude Cycle - A Journey to the Limits, about musical collaboration. From 2005 to 2006, Lipkind was a fellow of the Akademie Schloss Solitude. In 2006, he released the albums Miniatures & Folklore and Johann Sebastian Bach: 6 Suites a Violoncello Solo Senza Basso through Edel Music. Lipkind worked for two years on a production with pianist Roman Zaslavsky, and created the Lipkind Quartet. His 2009 touring schedule included concerts in the Netherlands, Japan, Ireland, and Switzerland. Lipkind gives cello master classes in Germany, the United States, Israel, and the Netherlands.

Lipkind plays an Italian cello labeled "Aloysius Michael Garani (Bologna, 1702)". It is called "Zihrhonheimer cello" and estimated to have been built between 1670 and 1680.

== Personal life ==
Lipkind lives in a nature preserve north of Frankfurt am Main, Germany, and is Married to the violinist Anna Lipkind.

== Discography ==
- Johann Sebastian Bach: 6 Suites a Violoncello Solo Senza Basso (2006)
- Miniatures & Folklore (2006)
