= Irina of Russia =

Irina of Russia may refer to:

- Irina Godunova, tsarina of tsar Fyodor I Ivanovich and sister of tsar Boris Godunov
- Tsarevna Irina Mikhailovna of Russia, eldest daughter of tsar Mikhail Fyodorovich
- Princess Irina Alexandrovna of Russia, only daughter of Grand Duke Alexander Mikhailovich and Grand Duchess Xenia Alexandrovna

== See also ==
- Irina Romanova (disambiguation)
