= Romanenko, Volgograd Oblast =

Romanenko Романенко
- Khutor
- Location within Volgograd Oblast Location within Russia
- Coordinates: 49°40′N 46°34′E
- Country: Russia
- Region: Volgograd Oblast
- District: Pallasovsky District
- Time zone: UTC+4:00

Romanenko (Russian: Романенко) is a rural locality (a khutor) in Goncharovskoye Rural Settlement, Pallasovsky District, Volgograd Oblast, Russia. The population was 32 as of 2010.

== Geography ==
Romanenko is located in steppe, on the Caspian Depression, 70 km southwest of Pallasovka (the district's administrative centre) by road. Gonchary is the nearest rural locality.
