= Romaña =

Romaña is a Spanish-language surname. Notable people with the name include:

- Romaña (guerrilla leader), Henry Castellanos Garzón, a Colombian guerrilla leader
- Alberto Rey de Castro y Romaña (1869–1961), a Peruvian politician and diplomat
- Carlos Romaña (born 1999), a Colombian football player
- Cecilio Romaña (1899–1997, an Argentinian physician
- Eduardo López de Romaña (1847–1912), president of Peru 1899–1903
- Enrique Romaña (born 1988), Colombian football player

== See also ==
- Romana (disambiguation)
