= Roman Chatrnúch =

Slovak ice hockey defenceman

- Born: February 12, 1973 (age 52)
- Height: 6 ft 1 in (185 cm)
- Weight: 190 lb (86 kg; 13 st 8 lb)
- Position: Defence
- Shot: Left
- Played for: MHK Dubnica; HK 36 Skalica; HC Slavia Praha; HC Kladno; HK Dukla Trenčín
- Playing career: 1994–2013; 2016–2017

Roman Chatrnúch (born February 12, 1973) is a former Slovak professional ice hockey defenceman.

Chatrnúch played a total of 22 games in the Czech Extraliga, playing for HC Slavia Praha and HC Kladno. He also played in the Tipsport Liga for MHK Dubnica, HK 36 Skalica and HK Dukla Trenčín.

After his initial retirement in 2013, Chatrnúch was briefly an assistant coach for Dukla Trenčín. He then came out of retirement with MHK Dubnica in the Slovak 2. Liga during the 2016–17 season and became an assistant coach for the team during the 2019–20 season.
