= Roman Zawiliński =

Polish linguist, pedagogue and ethnographer

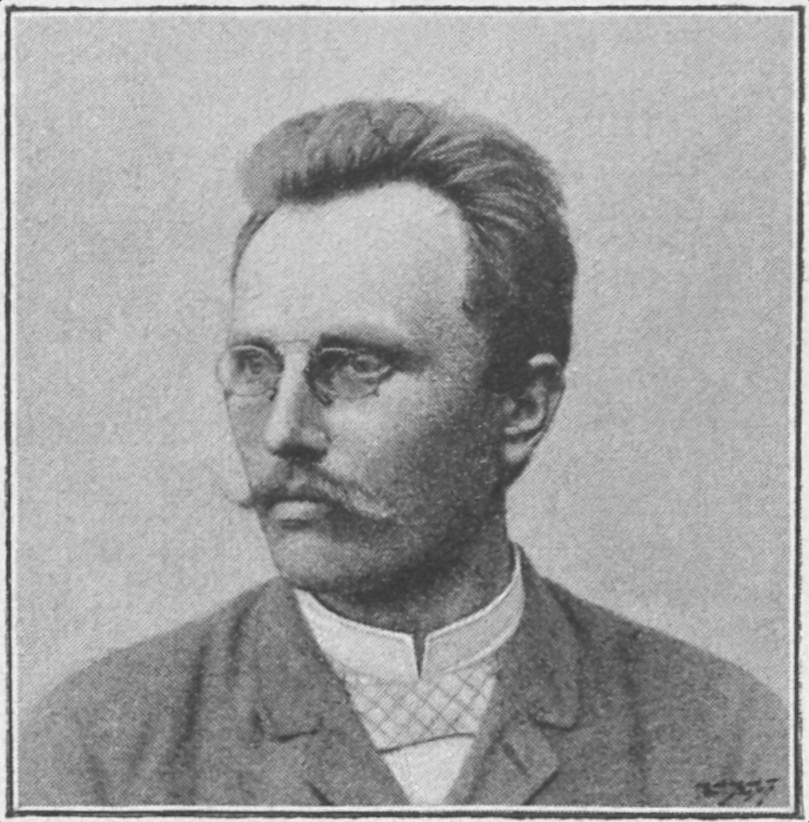
Roman Zawiliński

Roman Zawiliński (1855 in Brzeziny (now in Subcarpathian Voivodeship) – 12 October 1932 in Kraków) was a Polish linguist, pedagogue and ethnographer. The founder and editor of Poradnik Językowy.

His main fields of study was Lesser Polish dialect, didactics, Polish language grammar, ethnography, synonyms dictionary. Author of publications Brzeziniacy (1881), Dobór wyrazów. Słownik wyrazów bliskoznacznych i jednoznacznych... (1926).
