= Romano-Germanic =

Romano-Germanic may refer to:

- Romano-Germanic culture of ancient Germanic peoples subject to the Roman Empire
- Romano-Germanic law, a family of legal systems
- Romano-Germanic Empire, more commonly called the Holy Roman Empire
- Romano-Germanic Museum, Cologne, Germany
- Romano-Germanic Central Museum (Mainz), Germany
- Romano-Germanic languages, a language group of the Indo-European language family that consists of the Romance languages and the Germanic languages.
- Romano-Germanic pontifical, a set of Latin documents of Roman Catholic liturgical practice

Romano-German may refer to:

- Romano-German emperor, a term used by some historians for any emperor of the Holy Roman Empire
- "Romano-German", N.Y. Danilevsky's term for the opposite counterpart of Slavic culture in Europe

== See also ==
- Germanic Wars
