= Romano =

Romano may refer to:

== Food ==
- Pecorino Romano, a hard, salty Italian cheese
- Romano cheese, an American English and Canadian English term for a class of cheeses

== Places ==
=== Italy ===
==== Municipalities in the Metropolitan City of Rome, Latium ====
- Arcinazzo Romano
- Barbarano Romano
- Castel San Pietro Romano
- Cineto Romano
- Magliano Romano
- Mazzano Romano
- Monte Romano
- Montorio Romano
- Olevano Romano
- Ponzano Romano
- Sant'Angelo Romano

==== Municipalities in the Metropolitan City of Rome, Lazio ====
- Bassano Romano
- Carpineto Romano
- Fiano Romano
- San Vito Romano
- Trevignano Romano
- Vivaro Romano

==== Other places in Italy ====
- Romano Canavese, a municipality in Turin, Piedmont
- Romano d'Ezzelino, a small city in Veneto
- Romano di Lombardia, a municipality in Bergamo, Lombardy
- San Romano in Garfagnana, a municipality in Lucca, Tuscany

=== Other places ===
- Cape Romano, a cape on the Gulf Coast of Florida, U.S.
- Cayo Romano, an island on the northern coast of Cuba

== Structures ==
- Acquario Romano, a building in piazza Manfredo Fanti, Rome, Italy
- Estadio Romano, a multi-use stadium in Mérida, Spain
- Hotel Puente Romano, a hotel in Marbella, Andalusia, Spain
- Romano railway station, a railway station serving Romano di Lombardia, Lombardy, northern Italy, Milan–Venice railway
- Villa Romano, one of the greatest estates of "Valle della Cupa" and the biggest in Monteroni di Lecce, Italy

== Other uses ==
- Romano (name), including a list of people with the name
- Chantiers aéronavals Étienne Romano, a French aircraft company that was merged into SNCASE
- Corky Romano, a 2001 American comedy film
- Diario Romano, a booklet published annually in Rome giving feasts and fasts to be observed
- Circolo Speleologico Romano, an Italian, non-profit organization that researches caves
- L'Osservatore Romano, the daily newspaper of Vatican City State
- Pontifical Gregorian University, called "Collegio Romano"
- Romano, as a prefix meaning "related to ancient Rome"
- Romano-British culture, Romanized Britons under the Roman Empire
- Romano's Macaroni Grill, a chain of Italian-style restaurants in the U.S., Mexico and Canada

== See also ==
- Romano-Germanic (disambiguation)
- Romanos (disambiguation)
