= Roman Abrosimov =

Russian ice hockey player

- Born: 31 July 1994 (age 32) Kazan, Tatarstan, Russia
- Height: 6 ft 2 in (188 cm)
- Weight: 212 lb (96 kg; 15 st 2 lb)
- Position: Defence
- Shoots: Left
- VHL team Former teams: Bars Kazan; Ak Bars Kazan; HC Sochi; Neftekhimik Nizhnekamsk; HC Vityaz; Avangard Omsk; Amur Khabarovsk
- Playing career: 2011–present

Roman Vitalyevich Abrosimov (Russian: Роман Витальевич Абросимов; born 31 July 1994) is a Russian professional ice hockey defenceman who is currently playing with Bars Kazan in the Supreme Hockey League (VHL). He is a one-time Russian Champion, helping Ak Bars Kazan of the Kontinental Hockey League to the Gagarin Cup in 2018.

== Awards and honours ==
| Award | Year |
|---|---|
KHL
| Gagarin Cup (Ak Bars Kazan) | 2018 |
