= Roman Zamulin =

Russian serial killer

- Роман Замулин
- Born: 18 April 1984 (age 42); Yekaterinburg, Sverdlovsk Oblast, RSFSR, Soviet Union
- Other names: "The FSO Maniac" "The Night Carrier"
- Conviction: Murder
- Penalty: Life imprisonment

Details
- Victims: 6
- Span of crimes: 16 September – 4 November 2006
- Country: Russia
- State: Sverdlovsk
- Date apprehended: 7 November 2006

Roman Alexandrovich Zamulin (Russian: Роман Александрович Замулин; born 18 April 1984), known as The Night Carrier (Russian: Ночной извозчик), is a Russian serial killer and rapist who was active in Yekaterinburg in the autumn of 2006.

== Biography ==
Zamulin was born and grew up in a prosperous, working family. His service was held in the Ministry of Emergency Situations in Pervouralsk. During his dismissal he had the opportunity to come home to Yekaterinburg. After serving in the military, he got a job in the Special Communications Service, under the Federal Protective Service, gaining the rank of praporshchik. From December 2005, he worked as a driver in the FSO Department, and was characterized positively. Two years later, he met and began a relationship with a girl but, upon their break up, Zamulin began to feel hatred towards women.

From 16 September to 4 November 2016, Zamulin raped and killed six women and girls, all in the evening. To achieve this, he used the VAZ-2106 company car with tinted windows. A convenient working schedule - a five-day week or a day through three - allowed him to go searching for victims. Using his certificate as an FSO officer, he successfully passed police cordons. Driving through Yekaterinburg under the guise of a private driver, he selected female hitchhikers, brought them to uninhabited places, where he raped and strangled his victims. He then took money, mobile phones and other valuables from the dead. The bodies were thrown out in wastelands near garages or on roads. One victim of Zamulin survived his attacks.

The sixth victim's mobile phone was traced by police, and as a result went to Zamulin's cousin, who had received the phone. On 7 November 2006, Zamulin was arrested. At the time of his arrest, he had changed the inner lining of the car, on which the blood of the victims remained. When they searched his apartment, items belonging to the victims were found. The only surviving victim identified him as her attacker. When checking the records of outdoor nightclub cameras, where the sixth victim had been on the night of the attack, Zamulin's car was caught on tape and he was filmed approaching her. The records of the external surveillance cameras at the victim's residence were also examined and Zamulin's car was visible in the courtyard, but the woman did not leave it. Under pressure, he confessed to seven murders associated with rape, not knowing that one of the victims was still alive, although he initially was suspected of committing only four murders. Earlier, in connection with two cases to which the criminal confessed, the examination could not prove his guilt and the institution refused any further criminal proceedings. With the second examination, the murders were proven and the previous results were regarded as erroneous.

The forensic psychiatric examination found Zamulin sane. On 24 December 2007, the Ural Oblast Military Court sentenced him to life imprisonment in a special regime correctional colony. At the trial, Zamulin refuted all of his testimonies, except for the last murder, and stated that he would appeal the court's decision. The Supreme Court of Russia, after reviewing the cassation appeal, left the verdict unchanged.

=== In the media ===
- Documentary film "The Night Carrier" from the series "Criminal Chronicles"

== See also ==
- List of Russian serial killers
