= Romane =

Romane is a French feminine given name, a surname and a stage name. Notable people with the name include:

- Romane (musician) (born 1959), French guitarist, real name Patrick Leguidecoq
- Romane Bernies (born 1993), French basketball player
- Romane Bohringer (born 1973), French film artist
- Romane Bruneau (born 1996), French football goalkeeper
- Romane Denis (born 1998), Canadian actress
- Romane Dicko (born 1999), French judoka
- Romane Dieu (born 2000), French ski jumper
- Romane Garant Chartrand, Canadian filmmaker
- Romane Gueret, French film director
- Romane Munich (born 1994), French football player
- Romane Prigent (born 1999), French canoeist
- Romane Salvador (born 1998), French football goalkeeper
- Jean-Baptiste Romane (1807–1858), Haitian poet and playwright

== See also ==
- Romana (name)
