= Vladimir Lash =

Russian/Soviet footballer

Personal information
- Full name: Vladimir Lvovich Lash
- Date of birth: 29 October 1895
- Place of birth: Moscow, Russia
- Date of death: 29 January 1947 (aged 51)
- Position: Midfielder

Senior career*
Years	Team	Apps	(Gls)
1911–1922	Union Moscow		
1923	Yakht-Klub Raykomvoda Moscow		
1924–1926	Sakharniki Moscow		
1927	OPPV Moscow		
1928–1930	CDKA Moscow		

International career
1914	Russia	2	(0)
- * Club domestic league appearances and goals

Vladimir Lvovich Lash (Russian: Владимир Львович Лаш) (born 29 October 1895 in Moscow; died 29 January 1947) was a Russian and Soviet football player.

== International career ==
Lash made his debut for Russia on 5 July 1914 in a friendly against Sweden.
