= Armin Geus =

German medical historian and historian of biology (born 1937)

- Born: 1937 (age 88–89); Bad Staffelstein
- Scientific career
- Fields: History of medicine, history of biology
- Institutions: University of Marburg

Armin Geus (German: [ˈgɔʏs]; born 1937) is a German medical historian and historian of biology.

== Career ==
Geus received his academic education in zoology with a specialisation in parasitology. In 1964, he obtained his PhD for a work on the gregarinasina of Central European arthropods. In 1973, he became professor for history of medicine at the University of Marburg, a post he held until his retirement. In 1976, Geus founded the Basilisken-Presse, a publishing house specialized in the history of science, particularly the history of biology. In 1991, he established the Deutsche Gesellschaft für Geschichte und Theorie der Biologie ("German society for the history and theory of biology"). In 1998, the society was developed into the Biohistoricum, a biology museum with a research archive that is considered the only institution of its kind in Germany.

In 2008, Geus published a collection of essays critical of Islam entitled Gegen die feige Neutralität ("Against coward neutrality") with contributions by a number of German academics and journalists, including Karl Doehring, Ralph Giordano, Michael Miersch and Tilman Nagel.

In 2011, Geus published his work Die Krankheit des Propheten ("The sickness of the prophet") which he said examined the pathography of Muhammad, the founder of Islam, from a medical point of view. Geus attests Muhammad a "paranoid-hallucinatory schizophrenia with defined delusional imaginings and characteristic sensual deceptions". The book ranked in the top ten non-fiction list of the Süddeutsche Zeitung and Norddeutscher Rundfunk in June 2011, receiving a number of reviews from colleagues and in the press. A subsequent lawsuit by the Saudi-financed King Fahd Academy in Bonn with reference to the German blasphemy law was dismissed by the Marburg state prosecutor in October 2010, after Geus' defence team had invoked the academic freedom guaranteed by the German constitution. In September 2012, the anti-Islam organisation Citizens' Movement Pax Europa had brought the case, which it said was an attempt at "silencing" critical scholars, to an OSCE human rights conference at Warsaw.

== Selected works ==
- Festschrift der Naturwissenschaftlichen Gesellschaft Bayreuth, 1889-1964, Bayreuth: Naturwissenschaftliche Gesellschaft, 1964
- Krankheit und Kranksein in der Gegenwartskunst, Marburg an der Lahn: Basilisken-Presse, 1985, ISBN 3-9800020-9-8
- Johannes Ranke (1836-1916): Physiologe, Anthropologe u. Prähistoriker, Marburg an der Lahn: Basilisken-Presse, 1987, ISBN 3-925347-01-1
- Deutsche Zoologische Gesellschaft: 1890-1990, Stuttgart: Fischer Verlag, 1990 (co-author), ISBN 3-437-30648-0
- Miscellen zur Geschichte der Biologie, Frankfurt am Main: Kramer, 1994 (editor), ISBN 3-7829-1134-2
- Natur im Druck. Eine Ausstellung zur Geschichte und Technik des Naturselbstdrucks, Marburg an der Lahn: Basilisken-Presse, 1995 (co-author), ISBN 3-925347-36-4
- Repräsentationsformen in den biologischen Wissenschaften, Berlin: Verlag für Wissenschaft und Bildung, 1999 (editor), ISBN 3-86135-383-0
- Evolution durch Kooperation und Integration: zur Entstehung der Endosymbiosetheorie in der Zellbiologie, Marburg an der Lahn: Basilisken-Presse, 2007, ISBN 978-3-925347-83-2
- Gegen die feige Neutralität: Beiträge zur Islamkritik, Marburg an der Lahn: Basilisken-Presse, 2008 (co-editor), ISBN 978-3-925347-98-6
- Die Krankheit des Propheten, Marburg an der Lahn: Basilisken-Presse, 2011, ISBN 978-3-941365-15-5
