= Irina Romanova =

Irina Romanova may refer to:

- Irina Romanova (figure skater) (born 1972), Ukrainian ice dancer
- Princess Irina Alexandrovna of Russia (1895–1970), member of the House of Holstein-Gottorp-Romanov
- Tsarevna Irina Mikhailovna of Russia (1627–1679), oldest daughter of Russian tsar Mikhail Fyodorovich

== See also ==
- Irina of Russia (disambiguation)
