= Roman Romanov =

Roman Romanov may refer to:

- Roman Romanov (Lithuanian businessman) (born 1976)
- Roman Romanov (Ukrainian businessman) (born 1972)
- Roman Romanov (footballer, born 1981), Russian football player
- Roman Romanov (footballer, born 2003), Russian football player
- Prince Roman Petrovich of Russia
