= Rajnovac =

- Village
- Location within Bosnia and Herzegovina
- Coordinates: 45.202015°N 15.894536°E
- Country: Bosnia and Herzegovina
- Entity: Federation of Bosnia and Herzegovina
- Canton: Una-Sana
- Municipality: Velika Kladuša

Area
  - Total: 2.34 sq mi (6.07 km^{2})

Population (2013)
  - Total: 682
  - Density: 291/sq mi (112/km^{2})
- Time zone: UTC+1 (CET)
  - Summer (DST): UTC+2 (CEST)

Rajnovac is a village in the municipality of Velika Kladuša, Bosnia and Herzegovina.

== Demographics ==
According to the 2013 census, its population was 682.

Ethnicity in 2013
Ethnicity	Number	Percentage
Bosniaks	536	78.6%
Croats	4	0.6%
Serbs	1	0.1%
other/undeclared	141	20.7%
Total	682	100%
