= Roman Zakrzewski =

Polish painter (1955–2014)

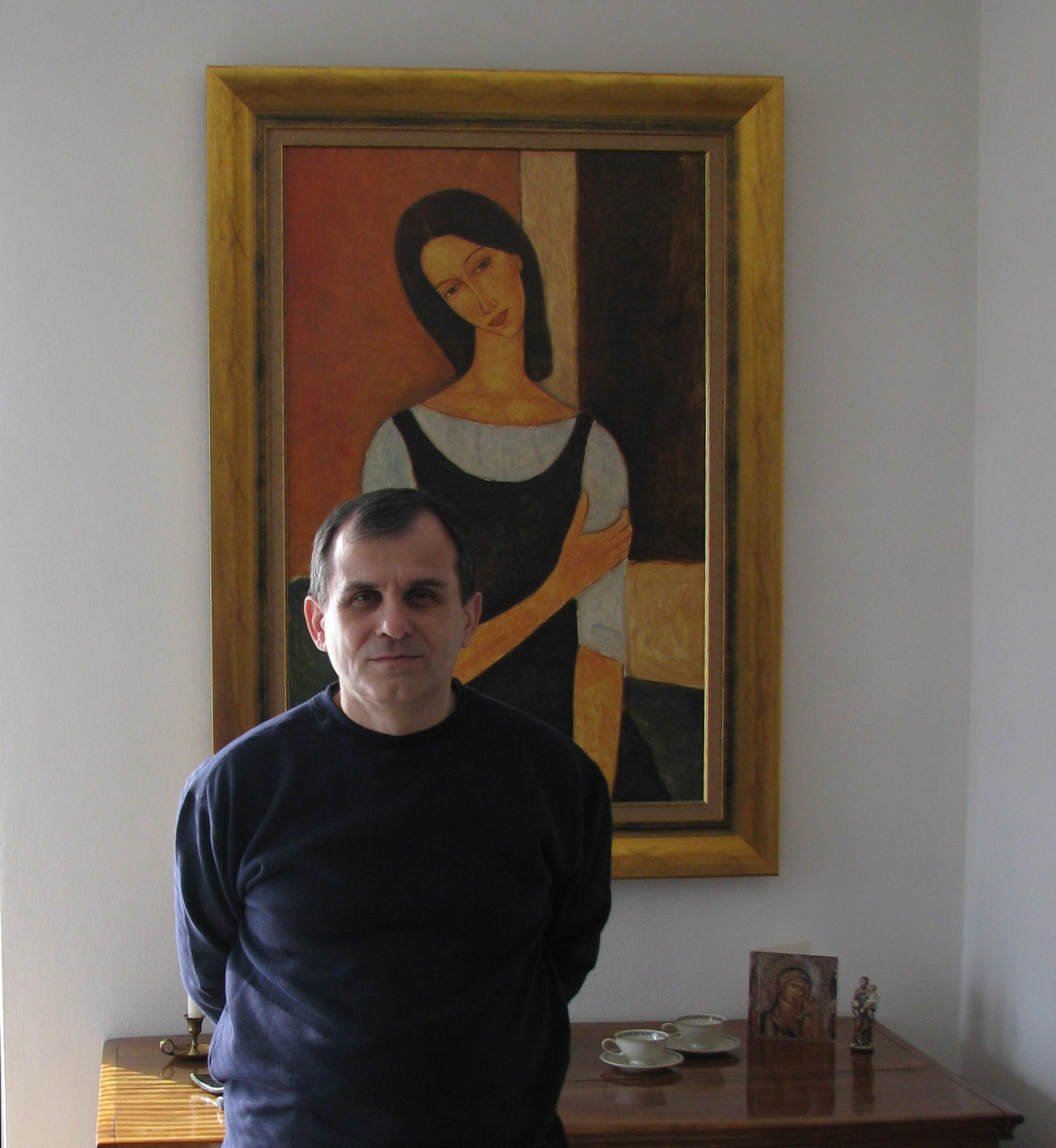
- Born: 1955; Oświęcim, Poland
- Died: 25 December 2014 (aged 58–59)
- Education: Jerzy Nowosielski
- Known for: Painting

Roman Zakrzewski (1955 – 25 December 2014) was a Polish painter. After beginning his artistic education in high school in Bielsko-Biała, he graduated from the Jan Matejko Academy of Fine Arts in Kraków and in 1985 from Jerzy Nowosielski studio. He lived and worked in Kraków.

The main subject of Zakrzewski's paintings is a woman's portrait that represents classical values. Exhibitions of his works have been presented in Bielsko-Biała, Kraków, Rzeszów, Warsaw, and the United States.

== Notable exhibitions ==
- "Jerzy Nowosielski i jego uczniowie" [Jerzy Nowosielski and his former students], The Forum Gallery, Kraków, Poland (1986)
- Paint exhibition in ART-CLUB, Kraków, Poland (1996)
- Paint exhibition in Katarzyna Napiórkowska Gallery, Warsaw, Poland (1997–2004)
- "Jerzy Nowosielski i jego uczniowie", The Sukiennice Gallery, Kraków, Poland (1999)
- Paint exhibition in The Town Museum, Bielsko-Biała, Poland (2002)
- Paint exhibition in Wanda Siemaszkowa Theatre, Rzeszów, Poland (2004)
