= Román Martínez =

Román Martínez may refer to:

- Román Martínez (boxer) (born 1983), Puerto Rican boxer
- Román Martínez (footballer, born 1983), Argentine football midfielder
- Román Martínez (basketball) (born 1988), American-born Mexican basketball player
- Román Martínez (footballer, born 2002), Mexican football forward
