= Justice Rodman =

Justice Rodman may refer to:

- William B. Rodman (1817–1893), associate justice of the North Carolina Supreme Court
- William B. Rodman Jr. (1889–1976), associate justice of the North Carolina Supreme Court
