= Mikhail Romanov (footballer) =

Russian footballer

Personal information
- Full name: Mikhail Alekseyevich Romanov
- Date of birth: 1895
- Date of death: 1961 (aged 65–66)
- Position: Midfielder

Senior career*
Years	Team	Apps	(Gls)
1913–1922	ZKS Moscow		

International career
1914	Russia	2	(0)
- * Club domestic league appearances and goals

Mikhail Alekseyevich Romanov (Russian: Михаил Алексеевич Романов) (1895–1961) was an association football player.

== International career ==
Romanov made his debut for Russia on July 5, 1914, in a friendly against Sweden.
