= Roman Zaslavsky =

Russian-Israeli classical pianist

Roman Zaslavsky רומן זסלבסקי
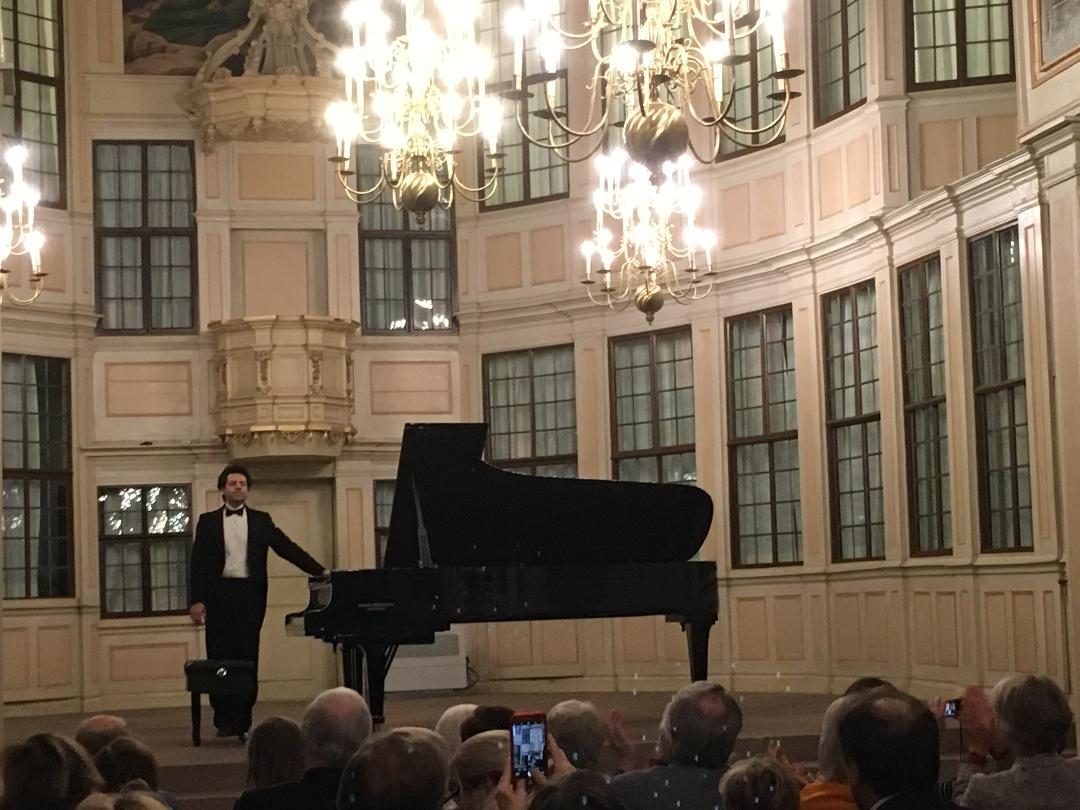
- Zaslavsky in recital

Background information
- Born: St. Petersburg, Russia
- Genres: classical music
- Instrument: piano
- Years active: 1991–present
- Website: Official website

Roman Zaslavsky (Hebrew: רומן זסלבסקי, Russian: Роман Заславский) is a Russian-Israeli classical pianist based in Vienna, Austria. Zaslavsky launched his international career after winning the Primer Gran Premio at the "Jose Iturbi" International Piano Competition in Valencia, Spain.

Zaslavsky's international appearances led him to the concert halls in Israel, Germany, Holland, Italy, Spain, France, Japan, China, Taiwan, Columbia, Mexico, Argentina and Brazil. He performed as soloist with the diverse international orchestras such as London Symphony Orchestra under the button of Gianandrea Noseda, Michail Jurowski, Lászlo Kovács, Constantin Trinks, Ligia Amadio. His solo recitals took him to the international stages such as the Laeiszhalle Hamburg, the Alte Oper in Frankfurt, the Philharmonie am Gasteig in Munich, the Berliner Philharmonie, the Recital Hall of the Royal Concertgebouw in Amsterdam, the Palau de la Música de València, the Auditorio Nacional de Música in Madrid, the Salle Gaveau in Paris, the Oji Hall in Tokyo, the Concert Hall "Kitara" in Sapporo, the Teatro do Sesi in Porto Alegre and the Sala São Paulo in São Paulo, Brazil, the Tel-Aviv Museum of Arts and the Jerusalem Theatre.

In the past few years, the pianist has given performances in Asia during his extensive tours in Taiwan and China, concertising among others in the National Concert Hall in Taipei, the Beijing Concert Hall, the Shanghai Oriental Arts Center, the Xi'an Music Hall etc.

Zaslavsky's discography contains several releases with EuroArts Music International: in 2012 the first Blu-Ray Audio release "Ingenious Opposites Vol.1" featuring works of Robert Schumann and Franz Liszt received the international Pizzicato Supersonic Award (2013). The sequel "Ingenious Opposites Vol.2", released in November 2013 on Blu-Ray Audio highly acclaimed by the "Pizzicato International Journal for Classical Music". Zaslavsky's release of the filmed studio solo recital with works of Sergei Rachmaninov and Sergei Prokofiev was published on DVD in 2016 and his live recorded piano recital with works of Robert Schumann and Franz Liszt was released on DVD in 2017.

In 2017 Roman Zaslavsky was appointed Professor for Piano at the University of Music and Arts in Vienna.

== Discography ==
- "Ingenious Opposites Vol.1" EuroArts Music International, 2013
- "Ingenious Opposites Vol.2" EuroArts Music International, 2014
- Ingenious Opposites - DVD EuroArts Music International, 2016
- Roman Zaslavsky Live - EuroArts Music International, 2017

== Professorship ==
Roman Zaslavsky is a professor for piano at MDW - University of Music and Arts, Vienna
