= Romanos, Aragon =

Romanos
- Municipality
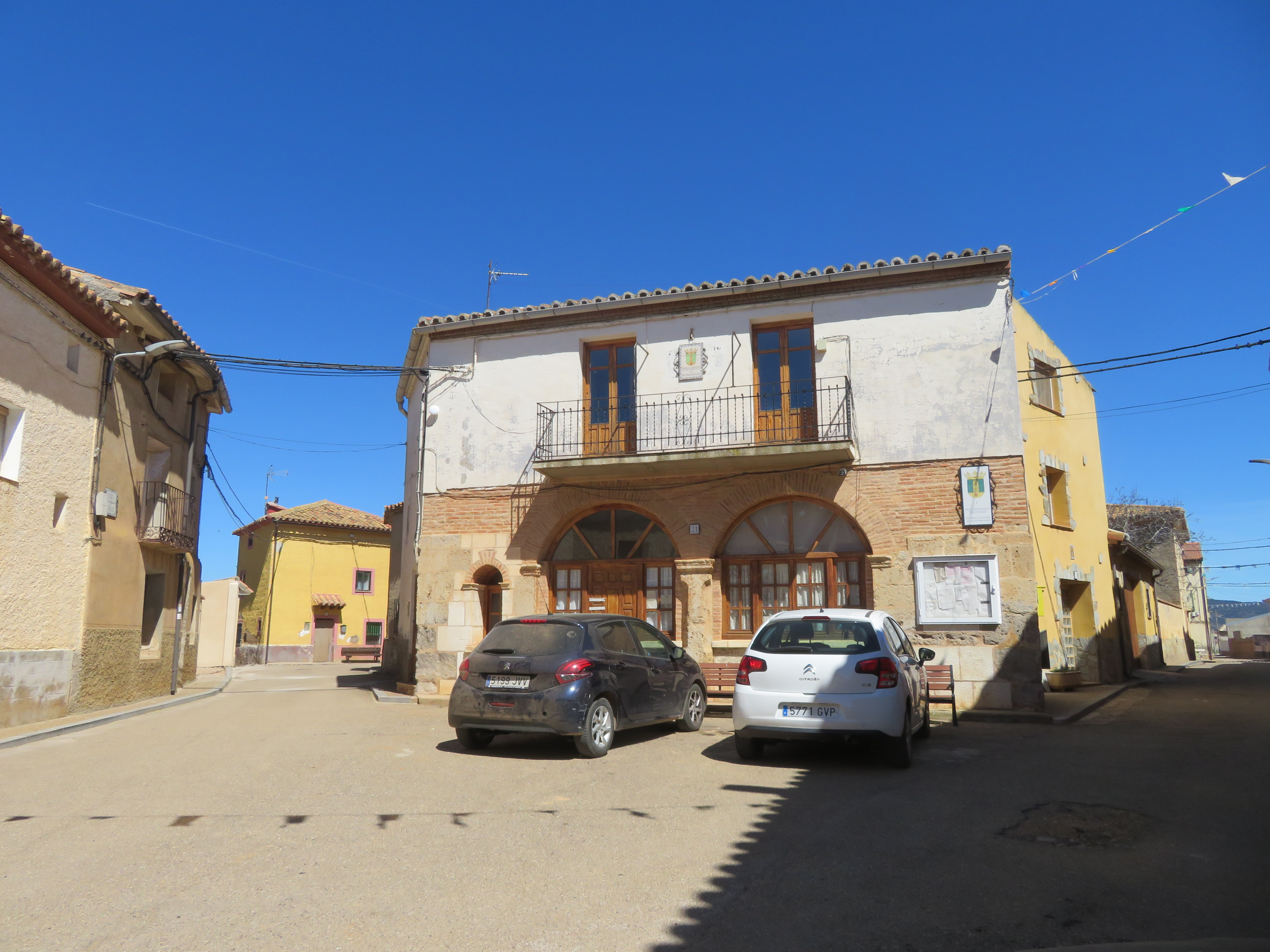
- Town hall

- Flag Coat of arms

- Location in Spain
- Coordinates: 41°7′N 1°16′W
- Country: Spain
- Autonomous community: Aragón
- Province: Zaragoza
- Comarca: Campo de Daroca

Area
  - Total: 19.53 km^{2} (7.54 sq mi)
- Elevation: 922 m (3,025 ft)

Population (2025-01-01)
  - Total: 140
  - Density: 7.2/km^{2} (19/sq mi)
- Demonym(s): Romanero, ra
- Time zone: UTC+1 (CET)
  - Summer (DST): UTC+2 (CEST)
- Postal code: 50491
- Official language(s): Spanish

Romanos is a small municipality in Campo de Daroca, in Aragón. It was an important town during the War of the Two Peters, and has many historic sites, such as castles and churches, some of which are part of the 156 monuments that the Government of Aragon presented to UNESCO for the declaration of the sites as historic protected sites. They were confirmed as this in 2001 in the UNESCO meeting in Helsinki.

== See also ==
- List of municipalities in Zaragoza
