= Bundeswehr Medical Academy =

German Military-Medical Academy

Coordinates: 48°12′36″N 11°34′53″E

- Sanitätsakademie der Bundeswehr
- Coat of arms of the Bundeswehr Medical Academy
- Active: Current name since 1997 ( founded in 1956 as "Sanitätstruppenschule des Heeres", 1980 moved into the Ernst-von-Bergmann-Kaserne (current location)
- Country: Germany
- Branch: Joint Medical Service
- Type: Training
- Role: Training of medical personnel
- Garrison/HQ: Ernst-von-Bergmann-Kaserne in Munich
- Motto(s): Gemeinsam hier – Gemeinsam vor – Gemeinsam stark! (Together here - Together forward - Together strong!)
- Website: www.bundeswehr.de/de/organisation/sanitaetsdienst/kommando-und-organisation-sanitaetsdienst/sanitaetsakademie-der-bundeswehr (German), www.bundeswehr.de/en/organization/bundeswehr-medical-service-/organisational-structure-of-the-bundeswehr-medical-service- (Entire branch, English)

Commanders
- Current commander: Always Generalstabsarzt (two-star-general of the Medical Service)

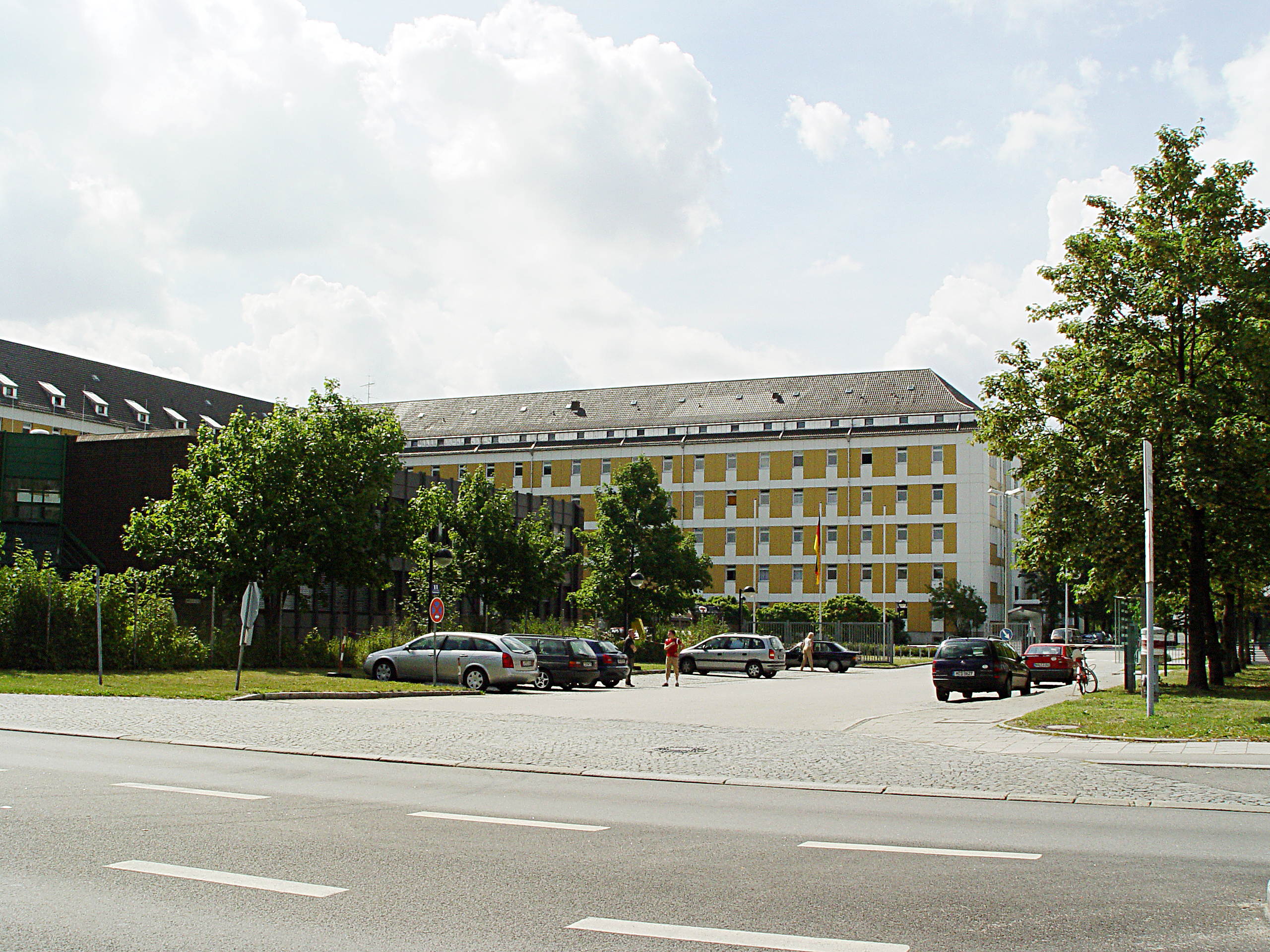
Sanitätsakademie der Bundeswehr

The Bundeswehr Medical Academy (German: Sanitätsakademie der Bundeswehr), (short SanAkBw) is a part of the Joint Medical Service of the Bundeswehr and is subordinate of the Bundeswehr Joint Medical Service Headquarters in Koblenz. It is the central education facility for medical training in the Bundeswehr and in charge of the coordination for military medicine and medical CBRN defense.

Subordinate to the academy are three institutes for radiobiology, microbiology and for pharmacology/toxicology.

== History and coat of arms ==
The academy was founded in 1956 as Sanitätstruppenschule des Heeres in Degerndorf am Inn. After the institutes were added it was renamed as the Academy for Medical Issues and Health of the Bundeswehr (German: Akademie des Sanitäts- und Gesundheitswesens der Bundeswehr) in October 1963. In 1997 the Bundeswehr Medical Academy (German: Sanitätsakademie der Bundeswehr) received its current name. The three institutes were returned to the academy in 2013, after the authority in charge the German: Sanitätsamt der Bundeswehr was disbanded. In 2012 the Audimax was named after Hans Scholl, a member of the White Rose, a resistance group against the Nazi-regime, who served as a medic at this time. In the COVID-19 pandemic in Europe the Institute for Mikrobiology of the academy was at the end of January 2020 the first place in Germany to isolate the virus for further research. Furthermore, the academy supports the local authorities.

The coat of arms goes back to Generalarzt Claus Günter Voss, who was in charge of uniting the academy in the current location and was introduced in May 1982. It is dark blue, resembling the colour of the medical branch of the Bundeswehr and includes the head of the ancient Greek goddess Athena with helmet. The letter A stands for the status as an academy. Behind the Athena is a diagonal Rod of Asclepius as sign for all types of medics and a sword, standing for the military background. All signs in front of the dark blue background are in white/silver, like the Coat of arms of Bavaria which symbolises the connection to the location of the base. The three institutes have similar coats of arms but with specific symbols instead of the letter A.
