= Romano (surname) =

Romano is a surname. Notable people with the name include:

== Acting ==
- Alex Romano (born 1979), Argentine actor
- Andrea Romano (born 1955), voice actress
- Andy Romano (1936–2022), American actor
- Carlo Romano (1908–1975), Italian film actor, screenwriter and voice actor
- Christy Carlson Romano (born 1984), American actress
- Gerardo Romano (born 1946), Argentine actor
- Janet Romano, American actress
- Larry Romano (born 1963), American actor
- Lou Romano (born 1972), American animator and voice actor
- Nina Romano, American actress
- Ray Romano (born 1957), American actor and comedian
- Rino Romano (born 1969), Canadian voice actor

== Art and writing ==
- Antonella Romano (born 1962), French historian of science
- Antoniazzo Romano (1430s–1510s), Italian Early Renaissance painter
- Fabrizio Romano (born 1993), Italian journalist
- Giulio Romano (c. 1490–1546), 16th-century Italian artist
- Gustavo Romano, Argentine artist
- Lalla Romano (1906–2001), Italian novelist, poet, and journalist
- Lou Romano (born 1972), member of the Art Department at Pixar Animation Studios
- Rose Romano (born 1959), American poet

== Music ==
- Aldo Romano (born 1941), Italian-French jazz drummer
- Daniel Romano (born 1985), Canadian musician
- Frank Romano (born 1970), American-born guitarist, songwriter and record producer
- Tony Romano (musician) (1915–2005), American guitarist and performer

== Politics ==
- Amy Romano, American politician
- Francesco Saverio Romano (born 1964), Italian politician
- Robert E. Romano (1905–1956), American lawyer and politician

== Sports ==
- Al Romano (born 1954), American football player
- Alejandro Romano (volleyball) (born 1974), Argentine volleyball player
- Ángel Romano (1893–1972), Uruguayan footballer
- Chapi Romano (born 1998), Argentine footballer
- Diego Romano (born 1980), Argentine footballer
- Félix Romano (1894–1970), Argentine footballer
- Florencia Romano (born 1970), Argentine football referee
- James Romano (1927–1990), American right-handed pitcher in Major League Baseball
- Jason Romano (born 1979), former professional baseball player
- Johnny Romano (1934–2019), American baseball player
- Jordan Romano (born 1993), Canadian baseball player
- Leandro Romano (born 1997), Argentine footballer
- Luke Romano (born 1986), New Zealand rugby union footballer
- María Romano (born 1931), Argentine fencer
- Megan Romano (born 1991), American swimmer
- Mike Romano (baseball) (born 1972), American baseball player
- Moshe Romano (born 1946), Israeli footballer
- Rubén Omar Romano (born 1958), Argentine footballer
- Sal Romano (born 1993), baseball player
- Serge Romano (born 1964), French footballer
- Thiago Romano (born 2006), Argentine footballer
- Tom Romano (born 1958), baseball player
- Tony Romano (ice hockey) (born 1988), American ice hockey player
- Yossef Romano (1940–1972), Israeli athlete murdered at the Munich Olympics

== Other people ==
- Alfredo Romano Jr (born 1988), Argentine businessman, professor and philanthropist
- Antonio Romano (disambiguation), multiple people
- Benito Romano (born 1950), Puerto Rican lawyer
- Carla Romano (born 1969), Scottish journalist
- Carmine Romano (1935–2011), New York mobster and captain in the Genovese crime family
- Da Romano, a medieval Italian family
- Edward A. Romano, American business executive
- John Romano (disambiguation), multiple people
- Jon Romano (born 1987), American TikTok influencer and convicted school shooter
- Joseph L. Romano, officer in the United States Air Force
- Morgan Romano (born 1998), American model and beauty queen
- Tony Romano (disambiguation), multiple people
- U. Roberto Romano (1956–2013), American filmmaker

== See also ==
- Romano (name)
- Romano (disambiguation)
- Romani (surname)
