= Hermeneutics of the Second Vatican Council =

Interpretations of the Vatican II council

The Hermeneutics of the Second Vatican Council, or the Hermeneutics of Vatican II, refers to the different interpretations of the Second Vatican Council given by theologians and historians in relation to the Catholic Church in the period following the Council.

This field of research is taught in some universities and explored by academic societies such as the John XXIII Foundation for Religious Sciences and the Bologna School. Historians such as Giuseppe Alberigo, John W. O'Malley, Christoph Theobald, and Gilles Routhier have often examined perceived or actual ruptures with pre-conciliar Catholicism from a progressive perspective, while others like Romano Amerio and Roberto de Mattei do so from a traditionalist viewpoint.

== Interpreting the council ==
Theologians and historians have debated the legacy of Vatican II and its interpretation. This discussion stems from the Council's stated intention, which was not to define "one point or another of doctrine and discipline" but to "re-establish in value and splendor the substance of human and Christian thought and life." This intention was accompanied by a lack of dogmatic definitions, which led to debate on the nature of the documents and their application.

All ecumenical councils of the Catholic Church have had historians who have offered their own interpretations. However, Roberto de Mattei argues that only for the Second Vatican Council have two opposing hermeneutics been debated. According to some critics, the presence of opposing hermeneutics stems from an ambiguity or ambivalence in the conciliar documents. Others have argued that the troubled reception of Vatican II is not unique to it and reflects a trend dating back to the Council of Nicaea.

Pope Benedict XVI (who participated in the development of the Council as a theological expert, Father Joseph Ratzinger), having witnessed the diverse perceptions of post-conciliar theology since its origins, stated that a large part of the hermeneutical problem was due to the interference of the press. He contended that the press spread politicized and ideological interpretations of the conciliar resolutions, which polarized parishioners and researchers and hindered the reception of the official hermeneutics of the Church in the face of what he considered "modernist distortions."

Benedict XVI also mentioned that in the faculties of theology of various universities in Germany and Central Europe, heterodox movements arose that hindered the implementation of conciliar reforms. He argued that these movements attempted to synchronize reforms with a supposed "conciliar spirit," often deviating from or contradicting the resolutions of the Vatican II documents. He further asserted that they practiced a "heretical Free Examination" by introducing political ideologies (such as Liberalism or Marxism) unrelated to the Council's intent, and that such practices had been previously condemned by the Church as the heresy of theological modernism.

This hermeneutics aims to highlight not only the documents approved by the Council but also the debates within the assembly and the external perception of the Council by the faithful.

In 2010, the historian Roberto de Mattei contributed to the debate with his book Il Concilio Vaticano II. Una storia mai scritta ("The Second Vatican Council – An Unwritten Story"), in which he argues, from a historical perspective, that it is impossible to separate the Second Vatican Council from post-conciliar abuses and that isolating these abuses as a pathology that developed in a healthy body is inaccurate.

== Benedict XVI ==
Benedict XVI has formulated in 2005 the idea of two hermeneutics of the Second Vatican Council: that of continuity, and that of discontinuity.

It has been noted that dividing people into these two hermeneutic camps "has become a favorite tactic of conservative commentators and some bishops, especially those who most want to downplay the idea that the [Second Vatican Council] altered the teaching or attitude of the church in any significant way".

=== Hermeneutics of continuity ===
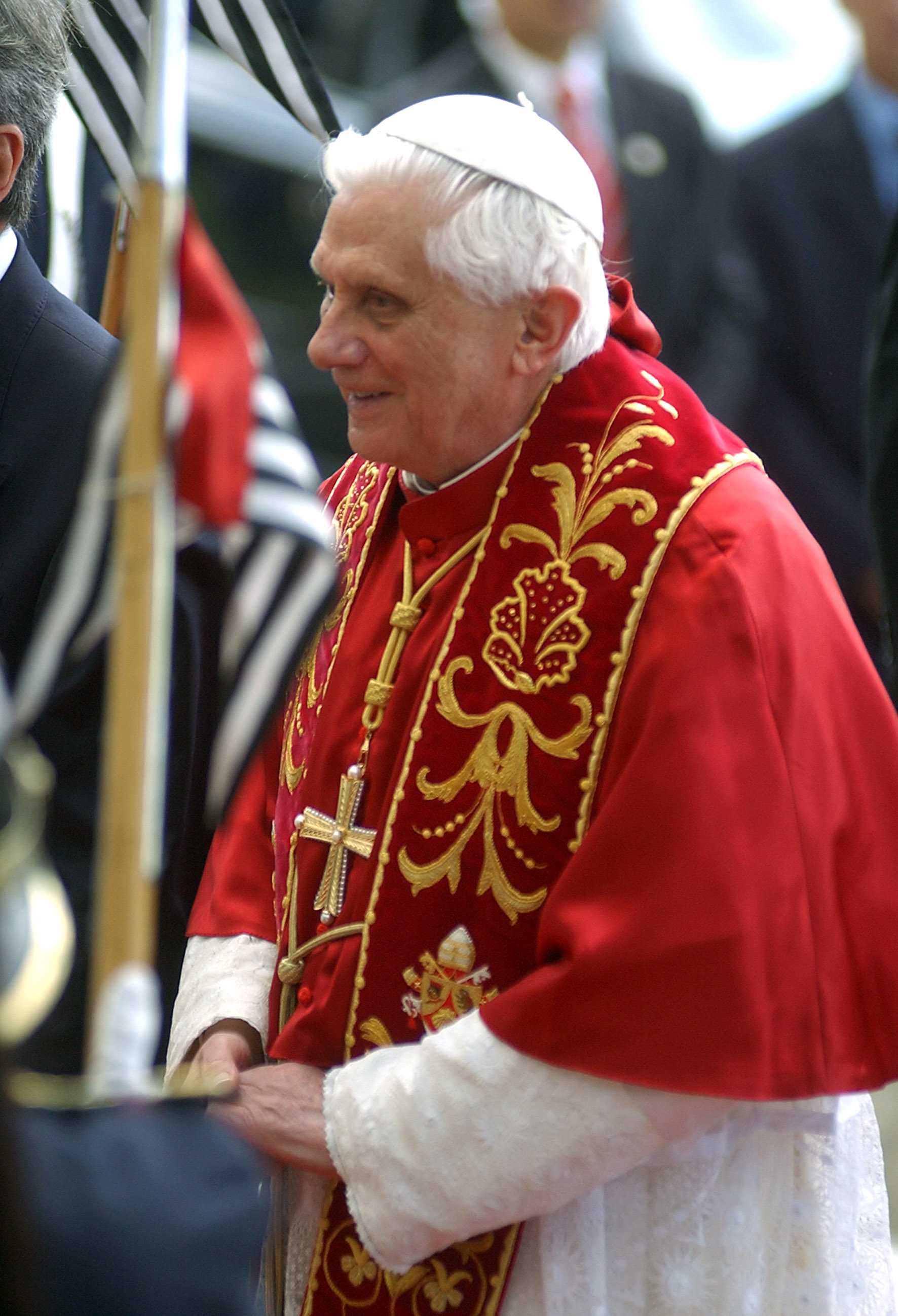
Benedict XVI emphasized a "hermeneutic of continuity".

The hermeneutics of continuity was formulated by Pope Benedict XVI:

Why has the reception of the Council, in large parts of the Church, been so difficult up to now? Well, everything depends on the correct interpretation of the Council or – as we would say today – on its correct hermeneutics, on the correct key to reading and applying it. The problems of reception arose from the fact that two contrary hermeneutics found themselves in confrontation and argued with each other. One caused confusion, the other, silently but ever more visibly, bore fruit. On the one hand there is an interpretation that I would call "hermeneutics of discontinuity and rupture"; it has often been able to avail itself of the sympathy of the mass media, and also of a part of modern theology. On the other hand there is the "hermeneutics of reform", of renewal in the continuity of the one subject-Church, which the Lord has given us; it is a subject that grows over time and develops, but always remains the same, the only subject of the People of God on the move.

— Benedict XVI, Address to the Roman Curia, 22 December 2005.

=== Hermeneutics of discontinuity ===
Benedict XVI criticized what he deemed to be the hermeneutics of discontinuity:

The hermeneutics of discontinuity risks ending in a rupture between the pre-conciliar Church and the post-conciliar Church. It asserts that the texts of the Council as such are not yet the true expression of the spirit of the Council. They are the result of compromises in which, in order to reach unanimity, many old things that are now useless had to be dragged along and reconfirmed. However, the true spirit of the Council is not revealed in these compromises, but rather in the impulses toward the new that underlie the texts: they alone represent the true spirit of the Council, and starting from them and in conformity with them, one should move forward. Precisely because the texts would only imperfectly reflect the true spirit of the Council and its novelty, it would be necessary to go courageously beyond the texts, making room for the novelty in which the deepest intention, although still indistinct, of the Council would be expressed. In a word: it would be necessary to follow not the texts of the Council, but its spirit.

— Benedict XVI, Address to the Roman Curia, 22 December 2005

==== Traditionalist Catholics ====
According to Roberto de Mattei, Catholic Traditionalist proponents of the hermeneutics of discontinuity include the philosopher Romano Amerio.

== Bologna School ==
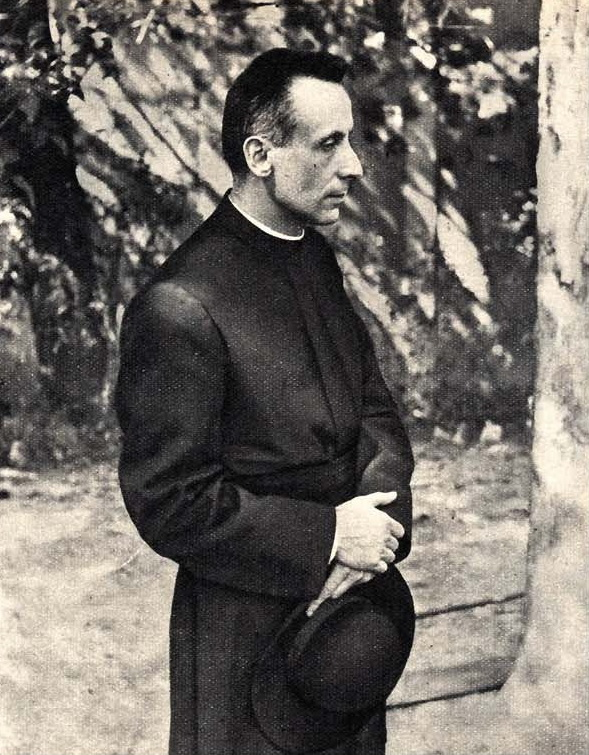
Giuseppe Dossetti was a progressivist at Vatican II and was a key inspiration for the Bologna School and a "hermeneutic of rupture."

Progressive proponents are represented by the "Bologna School," directed by Giuseppe Alberigo, a student of Giuseppe Dossetti and author of a multi-volume history of the Council.

They "emphasized the 'spirit' of the council, styling the progressive reformers as the heroes and the conservative minority at the council as the enemies of progress." It is named after the city of Bologna, the intellectual center for this school of thought and the headquarters of the John XXIII Foundation for Religious Sciences, which is associated with this perspective. Other leading thinkers in the Bologna School were Alberto Melloni, Giuseppe Ruggieri, and Maria Teresa Fattori. Outside Italy, this approach is supported by David Berger, John W. O'Malley, Gilles Routhier, and Christoph Theobald.

== See also ==
- Post Vatican II history of the Roman Church
- Magisterium of the Catholic Church
- Modernism in the Catholic Church
- Nouvelle Théologie
- Subsistit in
- Pact of the Catacombs
- Saint Gallen Group
- Epistemological rupture – Concept of knowledge theory
