= Robert Romano =

Robert Romano may refer to:

- Robert Romano (ER), a character in the TV series ER
- Robert E. Romano (1905–1956), member of the Illinois House of Representatives
- Robert Romano, musician in Shock of Pleasure
