= Synod =

Council of a church, convened to resolve issues of doctrine or administration

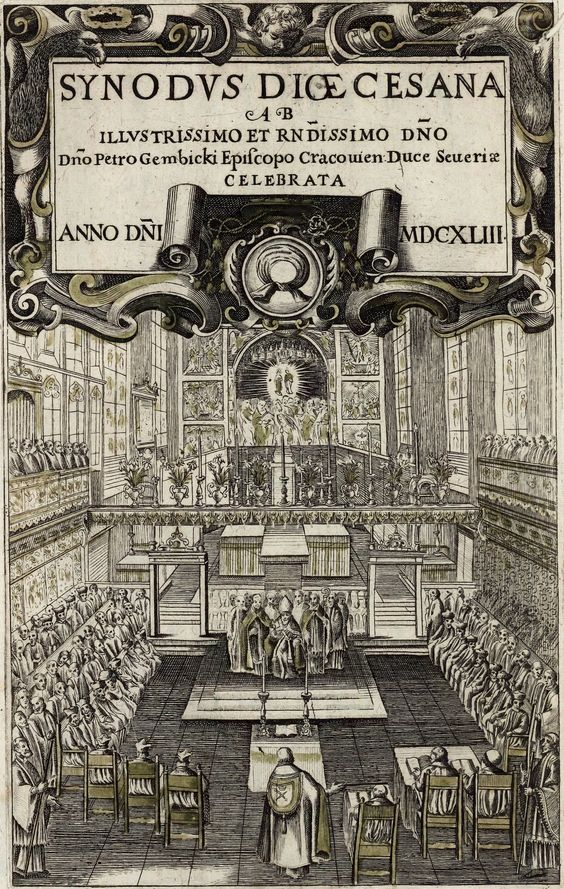
Diocesan synod in Kraków in 1643 presided by Bishop Piotr Gembicki

A synod (/ˈsɪnəd/) is a council of a Christian denomination, usually convened to decide an issue of doctrine, administration or application. The word synod comes from the Ancient Greek σύνοδος (synodos) 'assembly, meeting'; the term is analogous with the Latin word concilium 'council'. Originally, synods were meetings of bishops, and the word is still used in that sense in Catholicism, Oriental Orthodoxy and Eastern Orthodoxy. In modern usage, the word often refers to the governing body of a particular church, whether its members are meeting or not. The term is also sometimes used to refer to a church that is governed by a synod.

Sometimes the phrase "general synod" or "general council" refers to an ecumenical council. The word synod also refers to the standing council of high-ranking bishops governing some of the autocephalous Eastern Orthodox and Oriental Orthodox churches. Similarly, the day-to-day governance of patriarchal and major archiepiscopal Eastern Catholic Churches is entrusted to a permanent synod.

== Usages in different communions ==
=== Eastern Orthodox and Oriental Orthodox ===
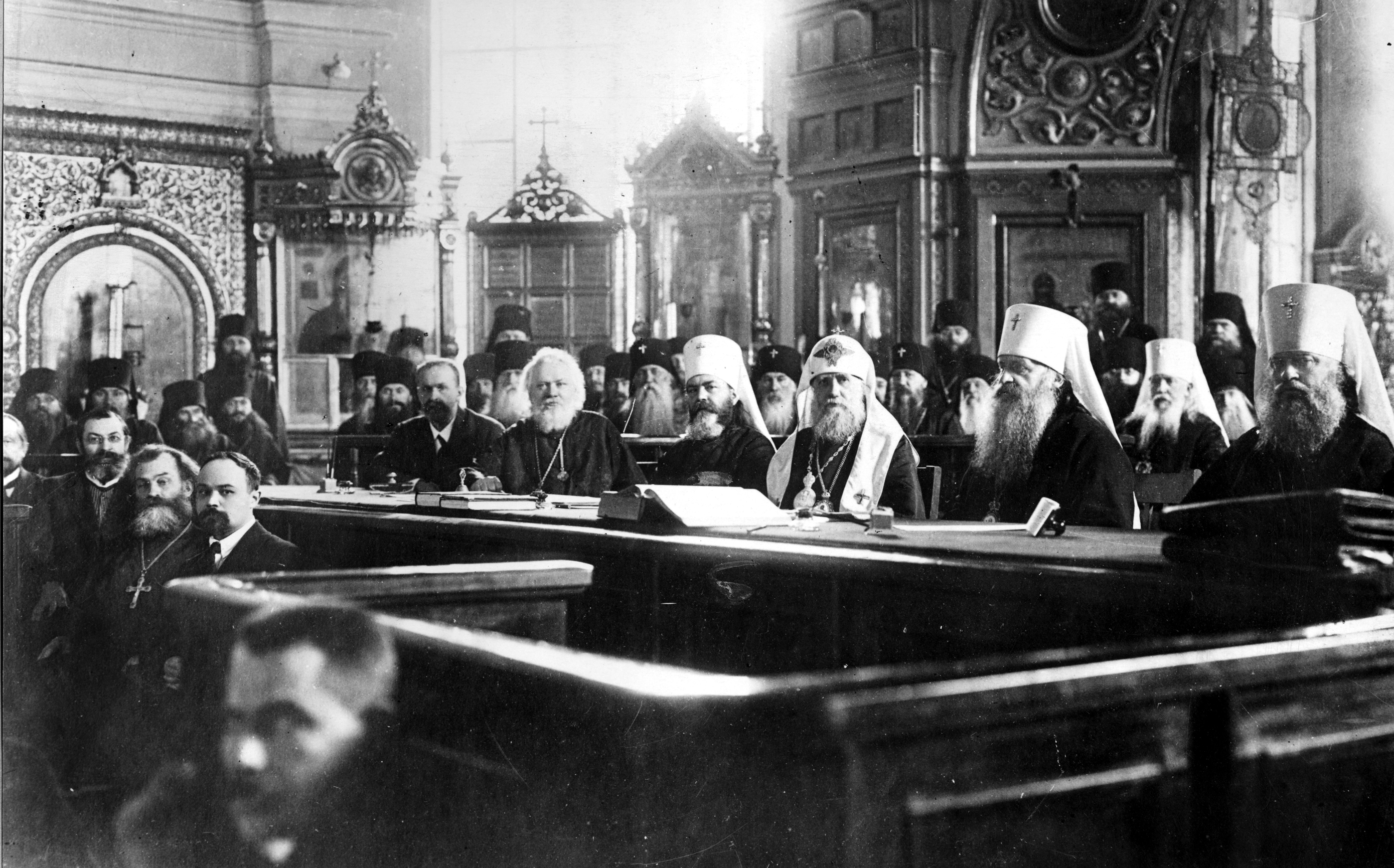
Holy Sobor of 1917, following the election of Saint Tikhon as Patriarch of Moscow

In Eastern Orthodox and Oriental Orthodox churches, synods of bishops are meetings of bishops within each autonomous Church and are the primary vehicle for the election of bishops and the establishment of inter-diocesan ecclesiastical laws.

A sobor (Church Slavonic: съборъ, romanized: sŭborŭ, lit. 'assembly') is a formal gathering or council of bishops together with other clerical and lay delegates representing the church to deal with matters of faith, morality, rite, and canonical and cultural life. The synod in the Western churches is similar, but it is distinguished by being usually limited to an assembly of bishops.

The term is found among those Eastern Orthodox Churches that use Slavic languages (the Russian, Ukrainian, Bulgarian, Serbian and Macedonian Orthodox Churches), along with the Romanian Orthodox Church.

==== Assembly ====
The presence of clerical and lay delegates is for the purpose of discerning the consensus of the church on important matters; however, the bishops form an upper house of the sobor, and the laity cannot overrule their decisions.

Kievan Rus' chronicles record the first known East Slavic church sobor as having taken place in Kiev in 1051. Sobors were convened periodically from then on; one notable assembly held in 1415 formed a separate metropoly for the church in the Grand Duchy of Lithuanian lands.

Important sobors in the history of the Russian Orthodox Church are:

- Vladimir's Sobor in 1276
- The Stoglavy Sobor (Sobor of a Hundred Chapters) in 1551
- The Moscow Sobor of 1666–1667, to deal with disputes surrounding the ecclesiastical reforms of Patriarch Nikon
- The All-Russian Sobor of 1917, which restored the Moscow Patriarchate and elected Saint Tikhon as the first modern Patriarch of Moscow
- The All-Russian Sobor of 1988, called on the 1000th anniversary of the Baptism of Rus' to guide the church in the wake of glasnost and the loosening of the Soviet grip over the church

A bishop may also call a sobor for his diocese, which again would have delegates from the clergy, monasteries and parishes of his diocese, to discuss important matters. Such diocesan sobors may be held annually or only occasionally.

=== Roman Catholic ===
In Roman Catholic usage, synod and council are theoretically synonymous as they are of Greek and Latin origins, respectively, both meaning an authoritative meeting of bishops for the purpose of church administration in the areas of teaching (faith and morals) or governance (church discipline or law). However, in modern use, synod and council are applied to specific categories of such meetings and so do not really overlap. A synod generally meets every three years and is thus designated an "Ordinary General Assembly". However, "Extraordinary" synods can be called to deal with specific situations. There are also "Special" synods for the Church in a specific geographic area such as the one held November 16 – December 12, 1997, for the Church in America.

==== Synod of Bishops ====
While the words "synod" and "council" usually refer to a transitory meeting, the term "Synod of Bishops" or "Synod of the Bishops", (Note: In English "Synod of Bishops" is the usual expression for what in other languages is usually called the "Synod of the Bishops": "eo:Sinodo de la Episkopoj", "es:Sínodo de los obispos", "fr:Synode des évêques", "it:Sinodo dei vescovi".) is also applied to a permanent body established in 1965 as an advisory body of the pope. It holds assemblies at which bishops and religious superiors, elected by bishops conferences or the Union of Superiors General or appointed by the Pope vote on proposals ("propositiones") to present for the pope's consideration, and which in practice the pope uses as the basis of "post-synodal apostolic exhortations" on the themes discussed. While an assembly of the Synod of Bishops thus expresses its collective wishes, it does not issue decrees, unless in certain cases the pope authorizes it to do so, and even then an assembly's decision requires ratification by the pope. The pope serves as president of an assembly or appoints the president, determines the agenda, and summons, suspends, and dissolves the assembly.

Modern Catholic synod themes:

- X "The Bishop: Servant of the Gospel of JESUS CHRIST for the hope of the world" 1998
- XI "The Eucharist: Source and Summit of the Life and Mission of the Church" 2005
- XII "The Word of God in the Life and Mission of the Church" 2008
- XIII "New Evangelisation for the Transmission of the Christian Faith" 2012
- Extraordinary General "The Pastoral Challenges of the Family in the Context of Evangelization" 2014

==== Councils ====
Meetings of bishops in the Roman Empire are known from the mid-third century and already numbered twenty by the time of the First Council of Nicaea (325). Thereafter they continued by the hundreds into the sixth century. Those authorized by an emperor and often attended by him came to be called ecumenical, meaning throughout the world (as the world was thought of in Western terms). Today, Council in Roman Catholic canon law typically refers to an irregular meeting of the entire episcopate of a nation, region, or the world for the purpose of legislation with binding force. Those contemplated in canon law are the following:

- An ecumenical council is an irregular meeting of the entire episcopate in communion with the pope and is, along with the pope, the highest legislative authority of the universal Church (can. 336). The pope alone has the right to convoke, suspend, and dissolve an ecumenical council; he also presides over it or chooses someone else to do so and determines the agenda (can. 338). The vacancy of the Holy See automatically suspends an ecumenical council. Laws or teachings issued by an ecumenical council require the confirmation of the pope, who alone has the right to promulgate them (can. 341). The role of the pope in an ecumenical council is a distinct feature of the Catholic Church.
- Plenary councils, which are meetings of the entire episcopate of a nation (including a nation that is only one ecclesiastical province), are convoked by the national episcopal conference.
- Provincial councils, which consist of the bishops of an ecclesiastical province smaller than a nation, are convoked by the metropolitan with consent of a majority of the suffragan bishops.

Plenary and provincial councils are categorized as particular councils. A particular council is composed of all the bishops of the territory (including coadjutors and auxiliaries) as well as other ecclesiastical ordinaries who head particular churches in the territory (such as territorial abbots and vicars apostolic). Each of these members has a vote on council legislation. Additionally, the following persons by law are part of particular councils but only participate in an advisory capacity: vicars general and episcopal, presidents of Catholic universities, deans of Catholic departments of theology and canon law, some major superiors elected by all the major superiors in the territory, some rectors of seminaries elected by the rectors of seminaries in the territory, and two members from each cathedral chapter, presbyterial council, or pastoral council in the territory (can. 443). The convoking authority can also select other members of the faithful (including the laity) to participate in the council in an advisory capacity.

Meetings of the entire episcopate of a supra-national region have historically been called councils as well, such as the various Councils of Carthage in which all the bishops of North Africa were to attend.

During the Middle Ages, some councils were legatine, called by a papal legate rather than the pope or bishop.

==== Synods ====
Synods in Eastern Catholic Churches are similar to synods in Orthodox churches in that they are the primary vehicle for election of bishops and establishment of inter-diocesan ecclesiastical laws. The term synod in Latin Church canon law, however, refers to meetings of a representative, thematic, non-legislative (advisory) or mixed nature or in some other way do not meet the qualifications of a "council". There are various types.

Diocesan synods are irregular meetings of the clergy and laity of a particular church summoned by the diocesan bishop (or other prelate if the particular church is not a diocese) to deliberate on legislative matters. Only the diocesan bishop holds legislative authority; the other members of the diocesan synod act only in an advisory capacity. Those who must be invited to a diocesan synod by law are any coadjutor or auxiliary bishops, the vicars general and episcopal, the officialis, the vicars forane plus an additional priest from each vicariate forane, the presbyterial council, canons of the cathedral chapter (if there is one), the rector of the seminary, some of the superiors of religious houses in the diocese, and members of the laity chosen by the diocesan pastoral council, though the diocesan bishop can invite others to attend at his own initiative. (can. 463)

==== Episcopal conferences ====
National episcopal conferences are another development of the Second Vatican Council. They are permanent bodies consisting of all the Latin Church bishops of a nation and those equivalent to diocesan bishops in law (i.e. territorial abbots). Bishops of other sui juris churches and papal nuncios are not members of episcopal conferences by law, though the conference itself may invite them in an advisory or voting capacity (can. 450).

While councils (can. 445) and diocesan synods (can. 391 & 466) have full legislative powers in their areas of competence, national episcopal conferences may only issue supplementary legislation when authorized to do so in canon law or by decree of the Holy See. Additionally, any such supplemental legislation requires a two-thirds vote of the conference and review by the Holy See (can. 455) to have the force of law. Without such authorization and review, episcopal conferences are deliberative only and exercise no authority over their member bishops or dioceses.

=== Anglican ===
In the Anglican Communion, synods are elected by clergy and laity. In most Anglican churches, there is a geographical hierarchy of synods, with General Synod at the top; bishops, clergy and laity meet as "houses" within the synod.

Diocesan synods are convened by a bishop in his or her diocese, and consist of elected clergy and lay members.

Deanery synods are convened by the Rural Dean (or Area Dean) and consist of all clergy licensed to a benefice within the deanery, plus elected lay members.

=== Lutheran ===
- In North America, a synod can be a local administrative region similar to a diocese in other denominations. An example of this is the Minneapolis Area Synod of the Evangelical Lutheran Church in America. However, for some denominations such as the Lutheran Church–Missouri Synod and the Wisconsin Evangelical Lutheran Synod, it denotes an entire church body. The usage of synod as an administrative ecclesiastical region is also reflected by the German term Synodalverband (i.e. synodal federation), such as the Regional Synodal Federation of the Free City of Danzig.

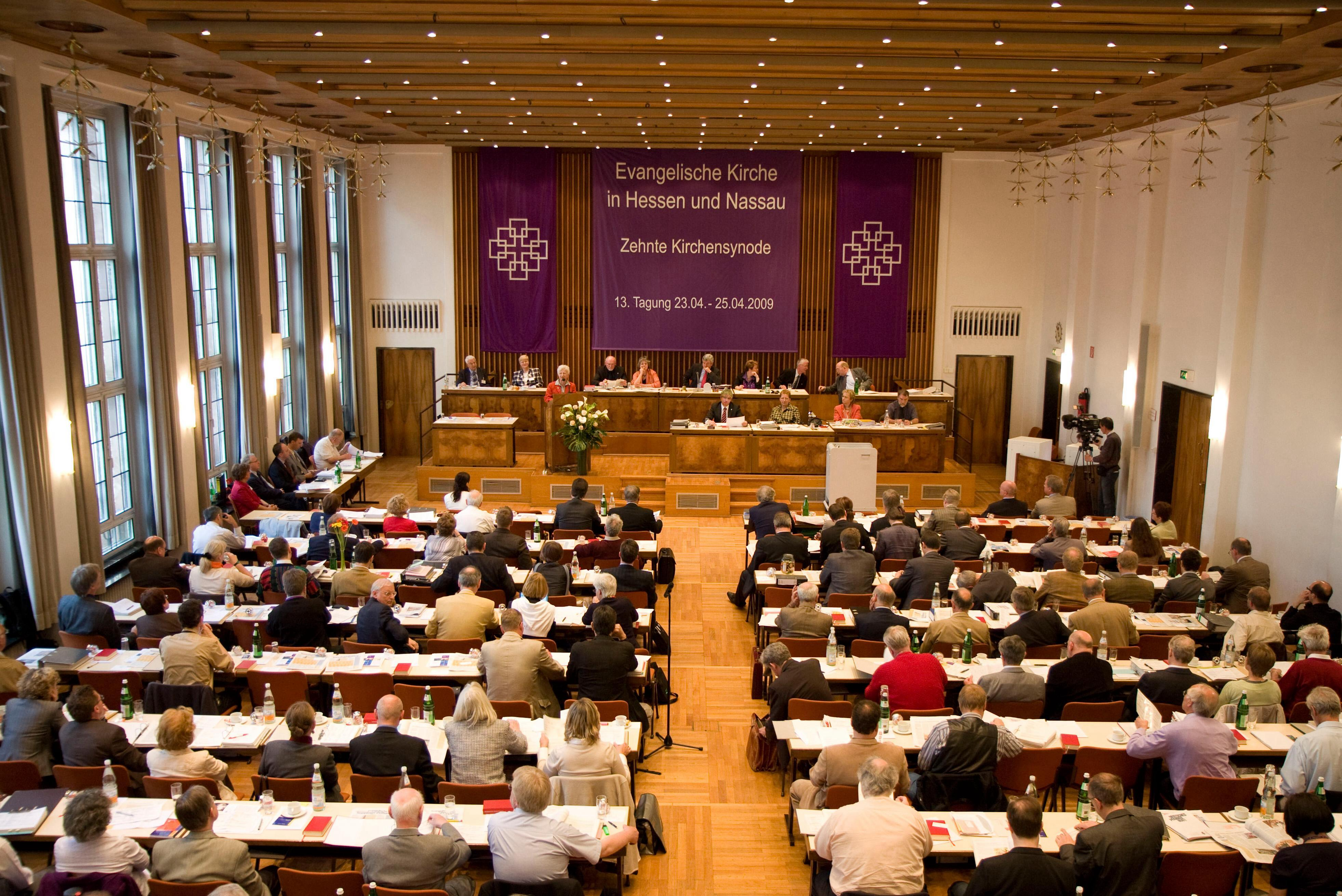
EKHN's 10th Church Synod (general assembly), 2009

- In Europe, a synod can be a legislature comprising deputies elected by all enfranchised members of a church and competent for the entire church. It is similar to a general assembly in Presbyterianism, and found, in regional Protestant church bodies (Landeskirche) in Germany; examples include Landessynode (i.e. regional or land synod) or Generalsynode (general synod). A synod can also be used by an administrative subunit of a church body, such as a city synod (Stadtsynode; comprising synodal deputies of congregations of one denomination within one city) or provincial synod (Provinzialsynode; comprising synodal deputies of congregations within an ecclesiastical province). The use of the term synod to describe a small gathering is now obsolete, the term used instead is Kirchenkreis.

=== Presbyterian ===
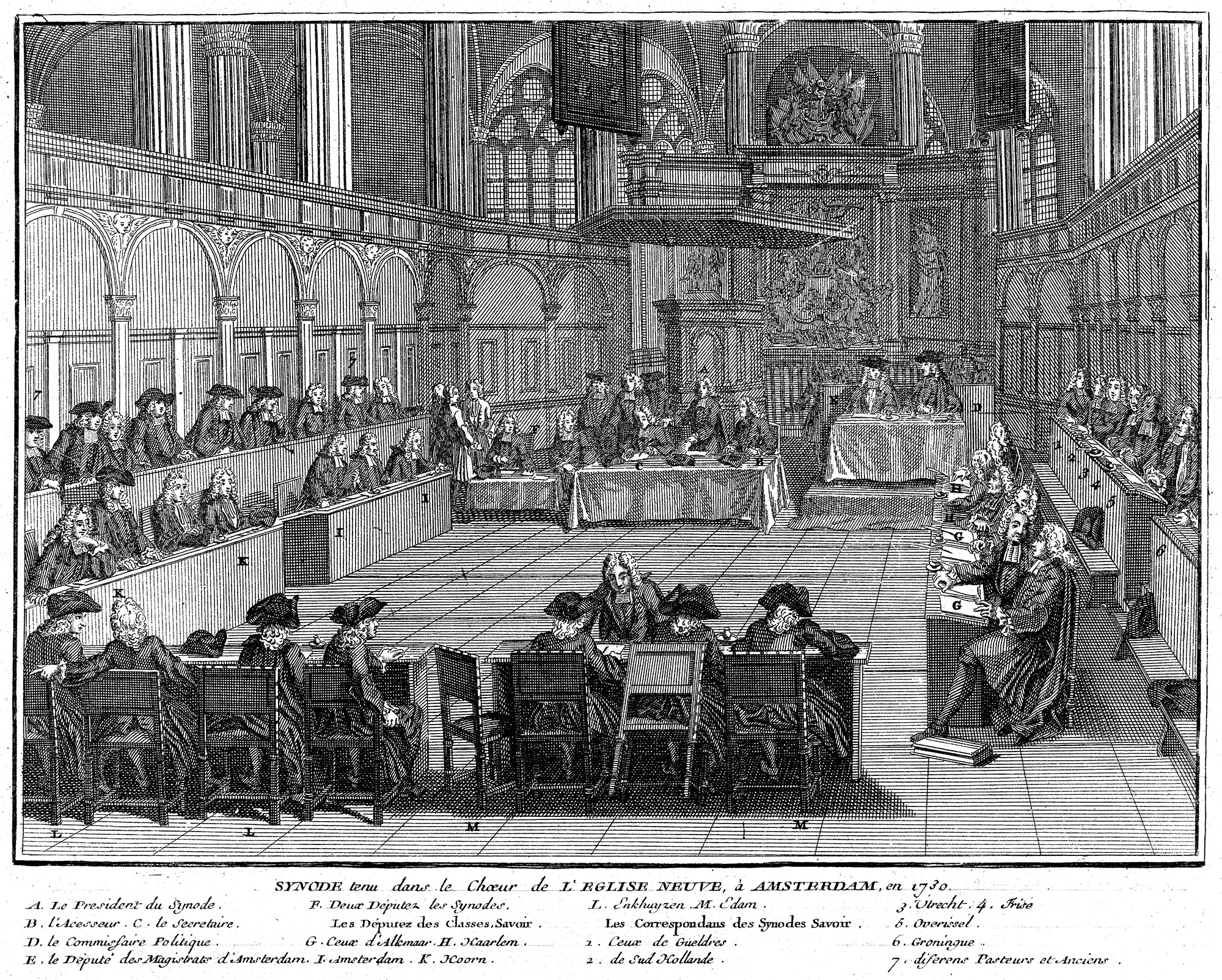
Members of a Reformed Synod in Amsterdam by Bernard Picart (1741)

In the Presbyterian system of church governance the synod is a level of administration between the local presbytery and the national general assembly. Some denominations use the synod, such as the Presbyterian Church in Canada, Uniting Church in Australia, and the Presbyterian Church USA. However some other churches do not use the synod at all, and the Church of Scotland dissolved its synods in 1993, see List of Church of Scotland synods and presbyteries. The Associate Reformed Presbyterian Church is considered a Synod since there is no national church in the United States. (see establishment principle)

=== Reformed ===
In Swiss and southern German Reformed churches, where the Reformed churches are organized as regionally defined independent churches (such as Evangelical Reformed Church of Zurich or Reformed Church of Berne), the synod corresponds to the general assembly of Presbyterian churches. In Reformed churches, the synod can denote a regional meeting of representatives of various classes (regional synod), or the general denominational meeting of representatives from the regional synods (general or national synod). Some churches, especially the smaller denominations, do not have the regional synod tier (for example, the Reformed Church in the United States (RCUS)). Historically, these were meetings such as the Synod of Homberg.

=== Church of Christ in Congo ===
In the Democratic Republic of the Congo, the vast majority of Protestant denominations have regrouped under a religious institution named the Church of Christ in Congo or CCC, often referred to – within the Congo – simply as The Protestant Church. In the CCC structure, the national synod is the general assembly of the various churches that constitutes the CCC. From the Synod is drawn an executive committee, and a secretariat. There are also synods of the CCC in every province of the Congo, known appropriately as provincial synods. The CCC regroups 62 Protestant denominations.

== See also ==
- Ancient church councils (pre-ecumenical) – church councils before the First Council of Nicaea
- College of Bishops
- Conciliabulum, the diminutive used for an irregular council
- United Methodist Council of Bishops
- Council of Jerusalem
- Ecumenical council, representing the universal episcopate
- First seven ecumenical councils
- Great Moscow Synod
- General Conference (LDS Church)
- Sobor on the Blood
- Sobornost
- Station days
- Stoglavy Sobor

== Bibliography ==
=== Collections of synodal decrees ===
- The Canons of the first four general councils of Nicaea, Constantinople, Ephesus and Chalcedon (in Ancient Greek). Oxford: Clarendon Press. 1880.
- Benson (1893). The six œcumenical councils of the undivided catholic church: Lectures delivered in 1893 under the auspices of the church club of New York. New York: E. & J.B. Young.
- DuBose, William Porcher (1896). The ecumenical councils. New York: Christian Literature Co.
- Percival, Henry Robert (1900). Schaff, P.; Wace, H. (eds.). The Seven Ecumenical Councils of the Undivided Church: Their Canons and Dogmatic Decrees, Together with the Canons of All the Local Synods which Have Received Ecumenical Acceptance. Nicene and post-Nicene Fathers of the Christian Church. Parker.
- Schwartz, E. (1914–1940), Acta conciliorum oecumenicorum [The Acts of the Ecumenical Councils] (See "Acta conciliorum oecumenicorum" (webpage). Wisconsin Lutheran College.)
- Schroeder, Henry Joseph (1937). Disciplinary decrees of the general councils: Text, translation, and commentary. St. Louis, MO: B. Herder Book Co.
- Straub, J. (1971), Acta conciliorum oecumenicorum [The Acts of the Ecumenical Councils] (See "Acta conciliorum oecumenicorum" (webpage). Wisconsin Lutheran College.)
- Alberigo, Giuseppe; Ioannou, Periclīs-Petros; Leonardi, Claudio; Jedin, Hubert (1962). Conciliorum Oecumenicorum Decreta. Basilae: Herder.
- Alberigo, Giuseppe; Dossetti, Joseph A; Jedin, Hubert (1973). Conciliorum Oecumenicorum Decreta. Bologna: Bologna Institute for Religious Sciences.
- Tanner, Norman P. (1990). Decrees of the ecumenical councils. Vol. 2 Volumes. Sheed & Ward; Georgetown University Press. ISBN 978-0-87840-490-2.
- Alberigo, Giuseppe; Melloni, Alberto, eds. (2000–2017). Conciliorum Oecumenicorum Generaliumque Decreta: Editio critica. Corpus Christianorum. Vol. 4 Volumes. Turnhout: Brepols Publishers.

=== Other ===
- The synod of Constantinople in Byzantine times (in German)
- Calculating the Synod? A network analysis of the synod of Constantinople in Late Byzantine times
