= Rojano =

Rojano is a surname. Notable people with the surname include:

- Antonio Rojano (born 1991), Argentine footballer
- Dionisio Emanuel Villalba Rojano (born 1989), Spanish footballer

== See also ==
- Romano (name)
