= Roberto de Mattei =

Italian historian (born 1948)

- Born: 21 February 1948 (age 78); Rome, Italy

Roberto de Mattei (born 21 February 1948) is an Italian traditionalist Catholic historian and author from Rome. He is the son of Michela Tarquin and Baron Rodolfo de Mattei (1899–1981), who was a professor emeritus at the University of Rome. His work focuses on the history of religious and political ideas in early modern Europe with a specific interest in traditionalist Catholic critiques of post–Second Vatican Council developments, contemporary relativism, and evolutionary theory.

== Biography ==
De Mattei studied at Sapienza University of Rome and graduated in 1972 with a degree in contemporary history. During his studies, he was a student and later an assistant to the philosopher Augusto Del Noce and the historian Armando Saitta at the Faculty of Political Sciences. Between 1985 and 2005, de Mattei served as professor of modern history at the University of Cassino.

From 2005 until his retirement in 2015, de Mattei served as professor of modern history and history of Christianity at the European University of Rome, where he also coordinated the degree program in history. For four years beginning February 2002, de Mattei served as Advisor for International Affairs to the Italian government. De Mattei is a member of the board of directors of the John Paul II Academy for Human Life and the Family. He is editor-in-chief of the monthly journal Radici Cristiane, and the weekly publication Corrispondenza Romana.

== Works ==
=== Reception and scholarly criticism ===
His book The Second Vatican Council: An Unwritten Story included "archival discoveries from the ultra-traditionalist Lefebvrians", as well as information concerning the role of the traditionalist Coetus Internationalis Patrum at the council. Catholic theologians Jared Wicks and Massimo Faggioli criticized the book, describing it as seriously flawed and arguing that it portrays the council and its leading figures in a polemical manner, and that it adopts an interpretation of Vatican II close to that of traditionalist critics. Archbishop Agostino Marchetto characterized the book as an ideological work that stands in sharp opposition to the School of Bologna, yet similarly presents Vatican II as a break with tradition, while the sociologist of religion Massimo Introvigne argued that it endorses a critical approach that, in his view, diminishes the importance of the council’s official documents.

=== COVID-19–related publications ===
During the COVID-19 pandemic, de Mattei published Le misteriose origini del Coronavirus (The Mysterious Origins of Coronavirus), a 2021 book released by Edizioni Fiducia that advances the hypothesis of a laboratory origin for the virus. He also authored On the Moral Liceity of the Vaccination, a work discussing the moral permissibility of receiving vaccines in light of Catholic ethical teaching.

== Views and controversies ==
=== Religious views and affiliations ===
De Mattei describes himself as "above all a disciple of Professor Plinio Corrêa de Oliveira". De Mattei has been described by progressive theologian Massimo Faggioli as "a renowned apologist for ultra-traditional Catholicism".

=== Criticism of Pope Francis ===
De Mattei was publicly critical of aspects of the pontificate of Pope Francis. In August 2017, he was among the signatories of the Correctio filialis de haeresibus propagatis, a letter sent to Pope Francis expressing concern that parts of the Church document Amoris laetitia, which deals with marriage and family life, were unclear. The signatories argued that this lack of clarity could lead Catholics to believe that long-standing Church teachings on marriage and the reception of Communion were being weakened. Earlier in February 2014, de Mattei's monthly radio program Radici Cristiane (Christian Roots) on Radio Maria was cancelled, reportedly because of his increasingly critical stance toward Pope Francis.

=== Russia–Ukraine war ===
De Mattei has publicly opposed the 2022 Russian invasion of Ukraine and has criticized traditionalist Catholic figures who expressed support for Russia, including Archbishop Carlo Maria Viganò. He has linked his interpretation of the conflict to the Marian apparitions at Fátima, arguing that their message offers a framework for understanding the war and its implications. In this regard, de Mattei considered valid the Consecration, made by Pope Francis on 25 March 2022, of Russia and Ukraine to the Immaculate Heart of Mary according to the dictates of Our Lady in the 1917 apparitions in Fatima.

=== National Research Council of Italy ===
Between 2003 and 2011, de Mattei served as vice president of the National Research Council of Italy, with particular responsibility for the humanities sector. In that role, he attracted criticism from members of the Italian scientific community for organizing and funding, through the Council, a conference that promoted positions critical of evolutionary theory. Some researchers and scientific associations subsequently called for his resignation from the Council’s vice presidency. In 2011, de Mattei was subject to criticism after stating, in a radio broadcast, that the 2011 Tōhoku earthquake and tsunami in Japan were a divine punishment, and after arguing that what he called the "contagion of homosexuality" contributed to the decline of the Roman Empire.

== Publications ==
- 1900–2000 – Due sogni si succedono: la costruzione la distruzione, Rome, Edizioni Fiducia, 1988, ISBN 978-88-86387-00-2.
- Il crociato del secolo XX. Plinio Corrêa de Oliveira, Milan, Piemme, 1996, ISBN 978-88-384-2643-8. Translated in 1997 in Portuguese, I edition: Civilização, ISBN 978-972-26-1433-7, II edition: Artpress Editora, 2015, ISBN 978-85-7206-240-4; in French, L'Age d'Homme, ISBN 978-2-8251-1022-5; in Spanish, Encuentro Ediciones, ISBN 978-84-7490-457-4; in English, Gracewings, 1998, ISBN 978-0-85244-473-3; in German, TFP, 2004, ISBN 978-3-9501846-0-0; in polish, Piotra Skargi, 2004, ISBN 978-83-89591-06-7.
- Alta Ruet Babylon. L'Europa settaria del Cinquecento. Lineamenti storici e problemi ecclesiologici, Milano, Istituto di Propaganda Libraria, 1997, ISBN 978-88-7836-429-5. Second edition A sinistra di Lutero. Sette e movimenti religiosi nell'Europa del '500, Roma, Città Nuova, 1999, ISBN 978-88-311-0326-8. Third edition, Solfanelli, Chieti, 2017, ISBN 978-88-7497-667-6.
- Pio IX, Milano, Piemme, 2000, ISBN 978-88-384-4893-5. Translated in Portuguese, Civilização, 2000, ISBN 978-972-26-1910-3 and in English, Gracewing, 2003, ISBN 978-0-85244-605-8.
- La souveraineté nécessaire. Réflexions sur la déconstruction de l’Etat et ses conséquences pour la société, Paris, Editions François-Xavier de Guibert, 2000. Translated in Italian, il Minotauro, 2001, ISBN 978-88-8073-060-6 and in Portuguese, Civilização, 2002, ISBN 978-972-26-2077-2. Second edition, I libri del Borghese, 2019, ISBN 978-88-7557-611-0.
- Quale papa dopo il papa, Milano, Piemme, 2002, ISBN 978-88-384-6524-6.
- Guerra santa guerra giusta. Islam e Cristianesimo in guerra, Milan, Piemme, 2002, ISBN 978-88-384-6980-0. Translated in Portuguese, Civilização, 2002, ISBN 978-972-26-1686-7 and in English, Chronicles Press/The Rockford Institute, 2007, ISBN 978-0-9720616-5-0.
- L'identità culturale come progetto di ricerca, Rome, Liberal Edizioni, 2004.
- La "Biblioteca dell’amicizia". Repertorio critico della cultura cattolica nell'epoca della Rivoluzione 1770–1830, Naples, Bibliopolis, 2005, ISBN 978-88-7088-487-6.
- De Europa. Tra radici cristiane e sogni postmoderni, Florence, Le Lettere, 2006, ISBN 978-88-6087-002-5.
- La dittatura del relativismo, Chieti, Solfanelli, 2007, ISBN 978-88-89756-26-3. Translated in Portuguese, Civilização, 2008, ISBN 978-972-26-2738-2; in polish, Warszawa, 2009, ISBN 978-83-61344-06-3 and in French, Muller Edition, 2011, ISBN 978-2-904255-92-2.
- Il CNR e le Scienze Umane. Una strategia di rilancio, Rome, National Research Council, 2008, ISBN 978-88-89756-26-3.
- La liturgia della chiesa nell'epoca della secolarizzazione, Rome, Solfanelli, 2009, ISBN 978-88-89756-59-1.
- Turchia in Europa. Beneficio o catastrofe?, Milan, SugarCo, 2009, ISBN 978-88-7198-573-2. Translated in English, Gracewing, 2009, ISBN 978-0-85244-732-1; in German, Resch Verlag, 2010, ISBN 978-3-935197-95-3 and in polish, Piotra Skargi, 2010, ISBN 978-83-88739-26-2.
- Il Concilio Vaticano II. Una storia mai scritta, Torino, Lindau, 2010, ISBN 978-88-7180-894-9. Translated in German, Sarto Verlag, 2011, ISBN 978-3-96406-011-2; in Portuguese, Ambientes & Costumes, 2012, ISBN 978-85-61749-36-1; in polish, Centrum Kultury i Tradycji, 2012, ISBN 978-83-935242-1-1; in English, Loreto Publications, ISBN 978-1-62292-002-0; in French, Muller Editions, 2013, ISBN 979-10-90947-12-2; in Spanish, Homo Legens, 2018, ISBN 978-84-17407-12-4; in slovak, Nadácia Slovakia Christiana, 2019, ISBN 978-80-972597-6-1. Prize Acqui-Storia 2013.
- Il mistero del male e i castighi di Dio, Verona, Fede & Cultura, 2011, ISBN 978-88-6409-110-5.
- Apologia della tradizione, Torino, Lindau, 2011, ISBN 978-88-7180-950-2. Translated in Brazilian, Ambientes & Costumes, 2013, ISBN 978-85-61749-37-8; in French, Editions de Chiré, 2017, ISBN 978-2-85190-188-0; in German, Grignon Verlag, 2018, ISBN 978-3-932085-67-3; in Spanish, Dufourq y Viano, 2018, ISBN 978-987-42-6940-9 and in English, Angelus Press, 2019, ISBN 978-1-949124-03-3.
- L'Euro contro l'Europa. Vent'anni dopo il Trattato di Maastricht (1992–2012), Rome, Solfanelli, 2012, ISBN 978-88-7497-752-9.
- Pio IX e la rivoluzione italiana, Siena, Cantagalli, 2012, ISBN 978-88-8272-763-5.
- La Chiesa fra le tempeste. Il primo millennio di storia della Chiesa nelle conversazioni a Radio Maria, Milan, Sugarco Edizioni, 2012, ISBN 978-88-7198-643-2. Translated in French, Le Drapeau blanc, 2017, ISBN 979-10-93228-09-9 and in English, Calx Mariae Publishing, 2022, ISBN 978-1-8384785-3-7.
- Vicario di Cristo. Il primato di Pietro tra normalità ed eccezione, Verona, Fede e Cultura, 2013, ISBN 978-88-6409-199-0.
- Il Ralliement di Leone XIII. Il fallimento di un progetto pastorale, Florence, Le Lettere, 2014, ISBN 978-88-6087-865-6. Translated in French, Les Editions du Cerf, 2016, ISBN 978-2-204-10555-2.
- Motus in fine velocior. On Eve of 2015 Synod, Rome, Edizioni Fiducia, 2015, ISBN 978-88-86387-12-5.
- Europa cristiana risvegliati, Rome, Lepanto, 2015.
- Plinio Corrêa de Oliveira. Apostolo di Fatima. Profeta del Regno di Maria, Rome, Fiducia, 2017, ISBN 978-88-86387-13-2.
- La Chiesa fra le tempeste. Vol. 2: Dal Medioevo alla Rivoluzione francese, Milan, Sugarco, 2018, ISBN 978-88-7198-736-1.
- Trilogia romana, Rome, Solfanelli, 2018, ISBN 978-88-3305-079-9.
- La critica alla rivoluzione nel pensiero di Augusto Del Noce, Florence, Le Lettere, 2019, ISBN 978-88-9366-115-7.
- Love for the Papacy and Filial Resistance to the Pope in the History of the Church, Brooklyn, NY, Angelico Press, 2019, ISBN 978-1-62138-455-7.
- L’Isola misteriosa, Chieti, Solfanelli, 2020, ISBN 978-88-3305-220-5.
- Pio V. Storia di un papa santo, Turin, Lindau, 2021, ISBN 978-88-3353-567-8.
- Sulla liceità morale della vaccinazione, Rome, Edizioni Fiducia, 2021, ISBN 978-1-8384785-0-6. Translated with the same publisher and in the same year in English, ISBN 978-88-86387-27-9; in Portuguese ISBN 978-88-86387-26-2; in German, ISBN 978-88-86387-30-9 and in French, ISBN 978-88-86387-29-3.
- Punishment or Mercy? The divine hand in the age of the coronavirus, London, Calx Mariae Publishing, 2021, ISBN 978-1-8384785-0-6.
- Le misteriose origini del coronavirus, Rome, Edizioni Fiducia, 2021, ISBN 978-88-86387-32-3. Translated in French, Editions David Reinharc, ISBN 978-2-493575-18-0.
- I sentieri del male. Congiure, cospirazioni, complotti, Milan, Sugarco Edizioni, 2022, ISBN 978-88-7198-799-6.
- Breve Trattato sulla Divina Provvidenza, Rome, Edizioni Fiducia, 2022, ISBN 978-88-86387-36-1.
- I padrini dell'Italia rossa, Chieti, Solfanelli, 2022, ISBN 978-88-3305-408-7.
- Dio castiga il mondo? La fede di fronte al mistero del male, Verona, Fede & Cultura, 2022, ISBN 979-12-5478-032-9.

=== Editor ===
- Finis Vitae. Is Brain Death Still Life?, Soveria Mannelli, CNR-Rubbettino, 2006. Translated in Italian, Rubbettino, 2007, ISBN 978-88-498-2026-3.
- Evoluzionismo. Il tramonto di una ipotesi, Siena, Cantagalli, 2009, ISBN 978-88-8272-500-6.
- Introduzione a San Pier Damiani, Liber Gomorrhianus, traduzione di Gianandrea de Antonellis, Rome, Edizioni Fiducia, 2015, ISBN 978-88-86387-10-1. Translated in polish, Wydawnictwo, 2022, ISBN 978-03-7864-485-9.
- Il primo schema sulla famiglia e sul matrimonio del Concilio Vaticano II, Rome, Edizioni Fiducia, 2015, ISBN 978-88-86387-11-8.
- Depositum Custodi, Rome, Edizioni Fiducia, 2018, ISBN 978-88-86387-15-6.
- Vecchio e nuovo modernismo. Radici della crisi nella Chiesa, Rome, Edizioni Fiducia, 2018, ISBN 978-88-86387-18-7.

== See also ==
- Hermeneutics of the Second Vatican Council
