= John XXIII Foundation for Religious Studies =

Italian research institution

- Fondazione per le scienze religiose
- Abbreviation: FSCIRE
- Named after: Pope John XXIII
- Founded at: Bologna, Italy
- Legal status: Foundation
- Location: Bologna, Italy
- Website: fscire.it
- Formerly called: Institute for Religious Studies in Bologna

The John XXIII Foundation for Religious Studies (Italian: Fondazione per le Scienze Religiose Giovanni XXIII) is a research institution in Bologna, Italy and is directed by Alberto Melloni. The organization publishes, organizes, receives and communicates research within religious studies with a particular view to Christianity.

The foundation began with Giuseppe Dossetti in 1953 and was originally called the Institute for Religious Studies in Bologna; in 1985 the Institute was renamed to John XXIII Foundation for Religious Studies. In addition to the many projects that the foundation supports it also maintains numerous archives and collections. One project of particular importance has been the Digital Maktaba, an interdisciplinary project to create and catalog works which are published in non-Latin alphabets such as Arabic, Persian, and Azerbaijani. The project is based at the La Pira library in Palermo and serves as the hub for the Foundation's history and doctrines of Islam.

== See also ==
- Hermeneutics of the Second Vatican Council
