= Romano (name) =

Romano is an Italian surname, also used as a given name.

Notable people with the name include:

== As a given name ==
=== Art and writing ===
- Romano Amerio (1905–1997), Swiss Italian theologian
- Romano Bilenchi (1909–1989), Italian novelist, short story writer and essayist
- Romano Romanelli (1882–1968), Italian sculptor
- Romano Vio (1913–1984), Italian sculptor

=== Politics ===
- Romano Prodi (born 1939), former prime minister of Italy

=== Sports ===
- Romano Bonagura (1930–2010), Italian bobsledder, 1964 Winter Olympics
- Romano Denneboom (born 1981), Dutch footballer
- Romano Fenati (born 1996), Italian Grand Prix motorcycle racer
- Romano Perticone (born 1986), Italian footballer who plays for Cesena

=== Other people ===
- Romano Artioli (born 1932), Italian entrepreneur
- Romano Bobone (10th century), Italian cardinal
- Romano Carapecchia (1666–1738), Italian architect
- Romano Guardini (1885–1968), Italian-German Catholic priest

== As a surname ==
- Romano (surname)

== Fictional characters ==
- Romano, a character in the American television series Ghost Whisperer
- Italy Romano (Lovino Vargas), a character in the Japanese webcomic Hetalia: Axis Powers
- Robert Romano (ER), a doctor from the American television series ER
- Vic Romano, a character in the American television series Most Extreme Elimination Challenge

== See also ==
- Roman (given name)
