= Ben Walter =

Canadian ice hockey player (born 1984)

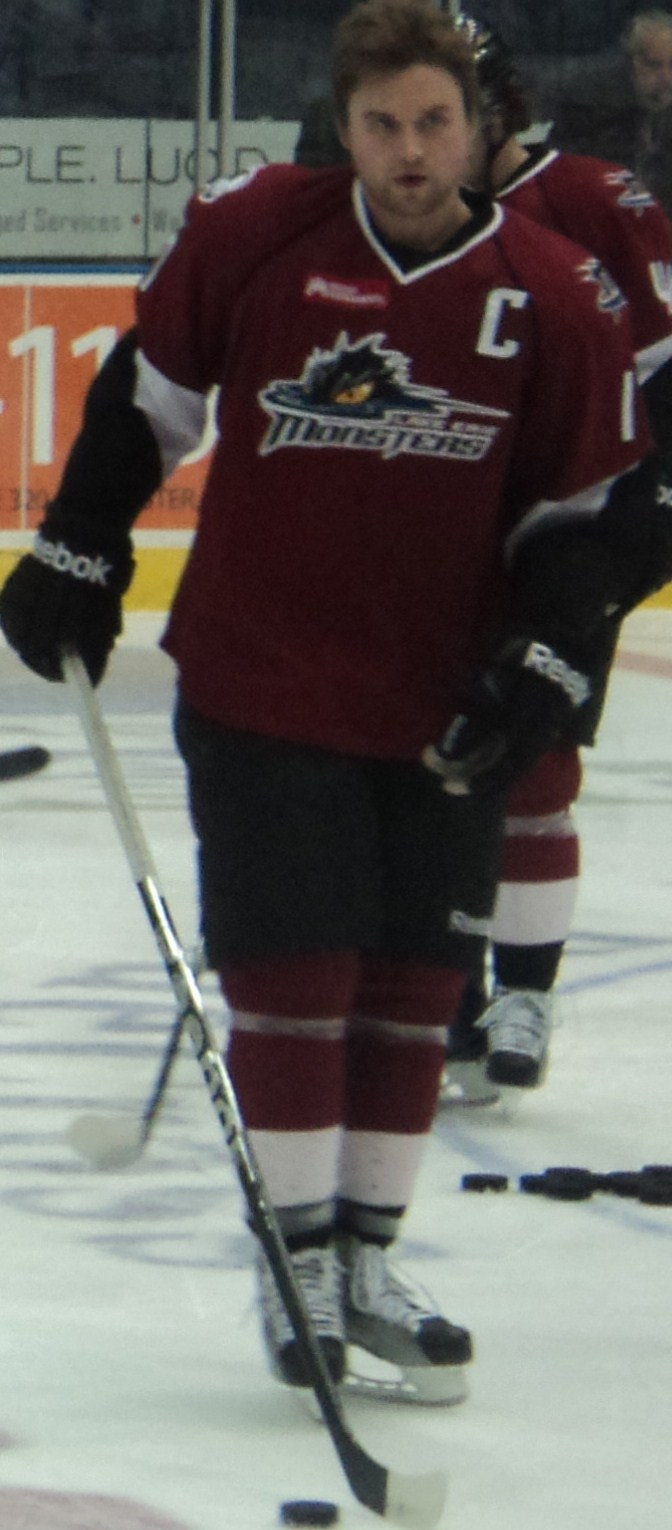
- Born: May 11, 1984 (age 42) Beaconsfield, Quebec, Canada
- Height: 6 ft 1 in (185 cm)
- Weight: 190 lb (86 kg; 13 st 8 lb)
- Position: Centre
- Shot: Left
- Played for: Boston Bruins; New York Islanders; New Jersey Devils; Örebro HK; Jokerit; EC Red Bull Salzburg; Nippon Paper Cranes; EC VSV
- NHL draft: 160th overall, 2004; Boston Bruins
- Playing career: 2005–2018

Ben James Walter (born May 11, 1984) is a Canadian former professional ice hockey centre. He most recently played with EC VSV in the Austrian Hockey League (EBEL). He has previously played in the National Hockey League and is the son of former NHL player Ryan Walter.

== Playing career ==
Walter first played junior hockey with the Langley Hornets in the British Columbia Hockey League for two seasons before he committed to play collegiate hockey with the University of Massachusetts Lowell in the NCAA Hockey East. An offensively-minded center, he finished second on the River Hawks in scoring as a sophomore in 2003–04 and was consequently drafted 160th overall in the 2004 NHL entry draft by the Boston Bruins. The ensuing season, Walter then co-led the River Hawks with 39 points in 34 games as a junior. Posting 3 hat-tricks throughout the season, Walter also led the Hockey East with 26 goals to be selected to the Hockey East Second All-Star team and earning a nomination as a Hobey Baker Award finalist.

Walter did not return for his senior year when he signed a three-year entry-level contract with the Bruins on August 31, 2005. He was among the final cuts of the Boston Bruins training camp for opening night roster for 2005–06 and started his first professional season with American Hockey League affiliate, the Providence Bruins. On the turn of the year Walter was recalled from Providence and made his NHL debut with the Bruins against the Los Angeles Kings on January 12, 2006. He went scoreless in 6 games with Boston before finishing his first season by scoring 40 points in 62 games with Providence. In the following 2006–07 season, Walter failed to find a role within Boston's line-up and appeared in only 4 games with the Bruins for the year. He spent the majority of the season with Providence and posted 67 points in 73 games to place second on the team in scoring and was named Providence Most Valuable Player to end the season.

On September 11, 2007, Walter was traded by the Bruins, along with a conditional second-round pick to the New York Islanders for Petteri Nokelainen. For the 2007–08 season, Ben was initially assigned to the Islanders AHL affiliate, the Bridgeport Sound Tigers before he played his first game for New York against the Pittsburgh Penguins in coach Al Arbour's 1,500th honorary NHL game for the Islanders on November 3, 2007. On March 11, 2008, Walter finally scored his first NHL goal (and point) against Karri Ramo and the Tampa Bay Lightning. In his three brief recalls to the Islanders he totaled only 8 games, however, he figured in a more prominent role to finish second on the Sound Tigers with 20 goals and 66 points. After the season Walter re-signed with the Islanders for an additional year in which he again was an influential player with the Sound Tigers in 2008–09. In 65 games with Bridgeport he matched his previous season tally with 20 goals and scored 50 points while also appearing in a further four games with the Islanders.

On June 30, 2009, he was traded by the Islanders to the New Jersey Devils for Long Islander, Tony Romano. After agreeing to a one-year deal with the Devils, Walter returned to his UMass Lowell roots when he was assigned to AHL affiliate, the Lowell Devils to start the 2009–10 season. Ben was leading Lowell in scoring after 45 games before on January 22, 2010, he was recalled to New Jersey to make his Devils debut against the Montreal Canadiens. He went scoreless in 2 games with the Devils before he was returned to Lowell to finish the year as top scorer with 22 goals and 58 points in 78 games to help Lowell reach the playoffs for the first and only time in franchise history.

On July 7, 2010, Walter signed as a free agent to a one-year contract with the Colorado Avalanche. During the 2010–11 pre-season, following the Avalanche's training camp, Walter was reassigned to AHL affiliate, the Lake Erie Monsters, to start the year. Walter led the Monsters in scoring with 70 points and in turn helped the Monsters qualify for their first post-season berth.

On July 2, 2011, Walter signed a two-year deal as a free agent with the Calgary Flames. He was later reassigned to AHL affiliate, the Abbotsford Heat to start the 2011–12 season. In two seasons with the Flames organization, Walter remained as an offensive leader in Abbotsford.

After the conclusion of the 2012–13 with the Heat, Walter was signed to his first contract abroad as a free agent, agreeing to a one-year deal with Örebro HK of the Swedish Hockey League on May 25, 2013. In the 2013–14 season, Walter struggled to transition to the Swedish league, posting just 2 goals in 35 games with Örebro before accepting a mid-season transfer to the Finnish Liiga with Jokerit on December 29, 2013.

In the off-season, Walter joined his third European club in short succession, in agreeing to a one-year deal with Austrian club, EC Red Bull Salzburg of the EBEL on August 5, 2014. During his two-year tenure in Salzburg, Walter contributed to the Red Bull's success in claiming back-to-back championships.

At the conclusion of his contract, Walter opted for a new venture, signing a one-year deal with Japanese based club, Nippon Paper Cranes of the Asia League on August 6, 2016. In the 2016–17 season, Walter added 12 goals and 39 points to the Paper Cranes offense.

On July 15, 2017, Walter returned to Austria in agreeing to a one-year deal with EC VSV of the EBEL.

== Career statistics ==
			Regular season					Playoffs
Season	Team	League	GP	G	A	Pts	PIM	GP	G	A	Pts	PIM
2000–01	Langley Hornets	BCHL	50	8	22	30	19	—	—	—	—	—
2001–02	Langley Hornets	BCHL	50	29	47	76	29	—	—	—	—	—
2002–03	University of Massachusetts Lowell	HE	35	5	12	17	12	—	—	—	—	—
2003–04	University of Massachusetts Lowell	HE	36	18	16	34	18	—	—	—	—	—
2004–05	University of Massachusetts Lowell	HE	36	26	13	39	32	—	—	—	—	—
2005–06	Providence Bruins	AHL	62	16	24	40	33	3	2	0	2	2
2005–06	Boston Bruins	NHL	6	0	0	0	4	—	—	—	—	—
2006–07	Providence Bruins	AHL	73	24	43	67	58	13	4	4	8	6
2006–07	Boston Bruins	NHL	4	0	0	0	0	—	—	—	—	—
2007–08	Bridgeport Sound Tigers	AHL	68	20	46	66	31	—	—	—	—	—
2007–08	New York Islanders	NHL	8	1	0	1	0	—	—	—	—	—
2008–09	Bridgeport Sound Tigers	AHL	65	20	30	50	10	5	1	4	5	2
2008–09	New York Islanders	NHL	4	0	0	0	0	—	—	—	—	—
2009–10	Lowell Devils	AHL	78	22	36	58	26	5	1	1	2	2
2009–10	New Jersey Devils	NHL	2	0	0	0	2	—	—	—	—	—
2010–11	Lake Erie Monsters	AHL	77	23	47	70	24	7	3	2	5	4
2011–12	Abbotsford Heat	AHL	75	19	40	59	30	8	1	7	8	2
2012–13	Abbotsford Heat	AHL	68	15	34	49	18	—	—	—	—	—
2013–14	Örebro HK	SHL	35	2	13	15	14	—	—	—	—	—
2013–14	Jokerit	Liiga	23	2	5	7	4	1	0	1	1	0
2014–15	EC Red Bull Salzburg	AUT	50	13	30	43	12	13	2	8	10	6
2015–16	EC Red Bull Salzburg	AUT	41	5	13	18	22	16	5	5	10	0
2016–17	Nippon Paper Cranes	ALH	48	12	27	39	40	2	1	2	3	2
2017–18	EC VSV	AUT	43	4	7	11	22	—	—	—	—	—
AHL totals			566	159	301	460	230	41	12	18	30	18
NHL totals			24	1	0	1	6	—	—	—	—	—
AUT totals			134	22	50	72	56	29	7	13	20	6

== Awards and honours ==
Award	Year	Notes
College
All-Hockey East Second Team	2004–05	

== Transactions ==
- June 27, 2004 - Drafted by the Boston Bruins in the 5th round, 160th overall.
- September 11, 2007 - Traded to the New York Islanders with a conditional 2nd round pick in the 2009 NHL entry draft for Petteri Nokelainen.
- June 30, 2009 - Traded, with a conditional draft pick in 2012, to the New Jersey Devils for Tony Romano.
- July 7, 2010 - Signed a one-year contract with the Colorado Avalanche.
- July 2, 2011 - Signed a two-year contract with the Calgary Flames.
