= Tony Romano =

Anthony or Tony Romano may refer to:

- Tony Romano (ice hockey) (born 1988), American ice hockey player
- Tony Romano (musician) (1915–2005), American actor, performer and guitarist

== See also ==
- Anthony Romano, character in the film Sinner
- Antonio Romano (disambiguation)
- Romano (disambiguation)
