= Alberto Melloni =

Italian church historian (born 1959)

Alberto Melloni from 2020

Alberto Melloni (Reggio nell'Emilia, 6 January 1959) is an Italian church historian, full professor at the University of Modena Reggio Emilia, Unesco Chairholder of the Chair on Religious Pluralism & Peace at Sapienza, Università di Roma and secretary of the Fscire -- Foundation for Religious Studies in Bologna-Palermo-Venice.

He has devoted himself in particular to the study of church councils and the Second Vatican Council, medieval canon law, the history of the papacy, several catholic institutions like the conclave and the history of the desire for Christian unity. holds the UNESCO Chair in Religious Pluralism and Peace at the Faculty of Law, Sapienza University of Rome, and is a national member of the Accademia dei Lincei and secretary of the Giovanni XXIII Foundation for Religious Sciences.

== Career ==
He studied in Bologna, at Cornell with Brian Tierney and in Fribourg (Switzerland) with Eugenio Corecco and Jean-Marie Tillard and he has taught at the University of Bologna and Roma Tre University. He is currently Professor of the History of Christianity at the University of Modena and Reggio Emilia. Holder of the Unesco Chair on religious pluralism and peace at Sapienza (Rome), he is Director of the Foundation for Religious Studies . fscire,it in Bologna-Palermo-Venice named after John XXIII because of the collection of his archives owned by the Fundation.

He is principal investigator for the European. He spearheaded the establishment of the Infraia Rei_Res project headed by the fscire (2015), Resilience research infrastructure project, the European Academy of Religion (2015), of the International Committee on Benedict XV centennial, the La Pira Library in the History and Doctrines of Islam in Palermo (2018), the European Research Infrastructure on Religious Studies Resilience-ri (2013 e 2020), the Italian National PhD programme DREST.EU (2021), the MA in Religions History Cultures with the Theological faculty of Bologna, Unibo e Unimore (2021), the amos Luzzatto Library on the history and doctrines of Judaism.

He worked on the History of the Second Vatican Council directed by Giuseppe Alberigo, and directed several international programmes like the Edizione nazionale dei diari di Angelo Giuseppe Roncalli (Istituto per le scienze religiose, Bologna, 2003-2008), Dizionario del sapere storico religioso del '900 (2010) e Cristiani d'Italia. Chiese, stato, società 1861-2011 (Treccani, Roma, 2011), Enciclopedia costantiniana (2013), Martin Luther. A Christian between Reforms and Modernity (1517-2017), Don Lorenzo Milani, Opera Omnia (2017), I Presidenti della Repubblica. Il Capo dello Stato e il Quirinale nella storia della democrazia italiana (ed. with Sabino Cassese and Giuseppe Galasso, 2018), I Presidenti e la Presidenza del Consiglio dei Ministri nell’Italia repubblicana. Storia, politica, istituzioni, (ed with Sabino Cassese and Alessandro Pajno, 2021), The Creed of Nicaea (325). The Status Quaestionis and the Neglected Topics (con Costanza Bianchi 2024), Episcopal elections in the Churches. Laws, Practices, Procedures, Doctrines (ed. with Federico Ruozzi 2025), Il Concilio e il Credo. Storia e trasmissione dei simboli di Nicea e Costantinopoli (ed with Costanza Bianchi and Massimiliano Proietti,2025), Francesco, il papa (2025).

He is chief editor for the project Conciliorum oecumenicorum generaliumqe decreta in Brepols's Corpus Christianorum and for the Mansi 3, a digital edition of all the church councils held in the course of history. He directs A History of the Desire for Christian Unity a multi-volume reference work on the history of Ecumenism ed by Brill.

He published works on medieval canon Law, the church and the state in the Twentieth century, on the Conclave.

He is a member of the Accademia dei Lincei, honorary member of the Accademia Rubiconia, alderman for the Académie internationale des sciences religieuses.

Member of the board the Enciclopedia Italiana, Fondazione Carisbo, PostePay, he is presidente of il Portico, a publishing company owing EBD, Marietti1820, Emi.

He serves as member of the international board for reviews such as the Revue d'histoire ecclésiastique in Leuven, Schweizerischen Zeitschrift für Religions- und Kulturgeschichte in Fribourg, and Studia Historiæ Ecclesiasticæ published by the University of South Africa.

He is working on La grande storia and special hosts for the national broadcasting History Channel. He has created and currently hosts Il sabbatico on Rainews24. He is also a columnist for both Il Corriere della Sera wince 2000 and he offered views and comments for many networks and newspapers.

Between 2020 and 2024, Melloni served as a Chief Scientific Advisor to the European Commission.

== Selected bibliography ==
=== Books ===
  - Ex post. Il conclave di papa Leone XIV, Marietti1820, Bologna 2025
  - Il conclave e l’elezione del papa. Una storia, sec. I-XXI, Marietti1820, Bologna 2024 ISBN 978-88-211-1363-5
  - Storia di μ. Lorenzino, don Milani, Marietti1820, Bologna 2023
  - Persino la luna. 11 ottobre 1962: come papa Giovanni XXIII aprì il Concilio, Milano (Utet) 2022
  - Tempus visitationis. Storia dell’intercomunione inaccaduta fra Roma e Costantinopoli, Bologna, il Mulino, 2019, 358 pp
  - Rimozioni. Lercaro, 1968, Bologna il Mulino 2019, 380 pp.
  - Il secondo miglio, FBK, Trento 2016 (download gratuito)
  - Il Concilio e la grazia. Saggi di storia sul Vaticano II, Milano, Jaca Book, 2016 ISBN 978-88-16-30549-6
  - Il giubileo. Una storia, Roma-Bari, Laterza, 2015 ISBN 978-88-581-2122-1
  - Amore senza fine, amore senza fini, Bologna, Il Mulino, 2015 ISBN 9788815254238
  - Quel che resta di Dio. Un discorso storico sulle forme della vita cristiana, Torino, Einaudi, 2013 ISBN 978-88-06-21143-1
  - Tutto e niente. I cristiani d'Italia alla prova della storia, Roma-Bari, Laterza, 2013 ISBN 978-88-581-0740-9
  - Dossetti e l'indicibile. Il quaderno scomparso di «Cronache sociali»: i cattolici per un nuovo partito a sinistra della DC (1948), Roma, Donzelli, 2013 ISBN 978-88-6036-859-1
  - Le cinque perle di Giovanni Paolo II, Milano, Mondadori 2011
  - Pacem in terris. Storia dell'ultima enciclica di Papa Giovanni, Roma-Bari, Laterza, 2010 ISBN 978-88-420-9326-8
  - Papa Giovanni. Un cristiano e il suo concilio, Torino, Einaudi, 2009
  - La storia che giudica la storia che assolve, saggi di O. Marquard e A. Melloni, Roma-Bari, Laterza, 2008
  - L'inizio di Papa Ratzinger. Lezioni sul conclave del 2005 e sull'incipit del pontificato di Benedetto XVI, Torino, 2006
  - Chiesa madre, Chiesa matrigna. Un discorso storico sul Cristianesimo che cambia, Torino, 2004
  - Il conclave. Storia di una istituzione, Bologna, 2001, ried. Il conclave. Storia dell'elezione del papa, Bologna, 2005
  - L'altra Roma. Politica e S. Sede durante il Concilio Vaticano II (1959-1965), Bologna, 2000
  - Il Giornale dell'Anima di Giovanni XXIII, Milano, 2000
  - Tra Istanbul, Atene e la guerra. Angelo Giuseppe Roncalli vicario e delegato apostolico (1935-1944), Genova, Marietti, 1993, 325 pp.
  - Innocenzo IV. La concezione e l'esperienza della cristianità come regimen unius personæ, prefazione di B. Tierney, Genova, Marietti, 1990.

=== Edizioni critiche ===
- Corpus Christianorum - Conciliorum œcumenicorum generaliumque decreta, ed. G. Alberigo et A. Melloni, Turnhout, 2007-2025, 6 voll. 13 t.
- Angelo Giuseppe Roncalli [Giovanni XXIII], Il Giornale dell'anima, vol. 1 dell'edizione nazionale dei Diari di Giovanni XXIII, 10 voll., Bologna, 1998-2001
- Marie-Dominique Chenu, Notes quotidiennes au Concile: Journal de Vatican II 1962–1963, a cura di Alberto Melloni, Paris, Cerf, 1995
- Don Lorenzo Milani, Tutte le opere, 2 voll., diretto da A. Melloni, Mondadori, Meridiani, 2017

=== Critical editions ===
- Corpus Christianorum - Conciliorum œcumenicorum generaliumqe decreta, ed. G. Alberigo et A. Melloni, Turnhout 2007 vol. 1; 2010 vol. 3; 2011 vol. 2, 2013 vol. 4-5
- Cronache sociali, 1947-1951, edizione anastatica integrale e introduzione a cura di Alberto Melloni , Bologna (Istituto per le scienze religiose) 2007, 1893 pp. con DVD
- Angelo G. Roncalli-Giovanni XXIII, «Il Giornale dell'Anima», Edizione critica ed annotazione a cura di Alberto Melloni , Bologna (Istituto per le scienze religiose) 2002m 545 pp. (I ed. 1987, 802 pp.)
- Dietrich Bonhoeffer, Poesie , a cura di A. Melloni, Bose 1999
- M.-D. Chenu, Notes quotidiennes au Concile , Paris 1995, pp. 7–54; [tr.it. Bologna 1996]
- Angelo G. Roncalli-Giovanni XXIII, La predicazione ad Istanbul. Omelie, discorsi e note pastorali (1935-1944), a cura di Alberto Melloni, Firenze (L.S. Olschki) 1993, 420 pp.
- Don Lorenzo Milani, Tutte le opere, 2 voll., diretto da A. Melloni, Mondadori, Meridiani, 2017
- Giuseppe Dossetti, La ricerca costituente. Interventi 1945-1952 , Bologna 1994

== Honors ==
Commendatore dell'Ordine al merito della Repubblica italiana - ribbon for ordinary uniform

Commendatore dell'Ordine al merito della Repubblica italiana
— 27 dicembre 2020

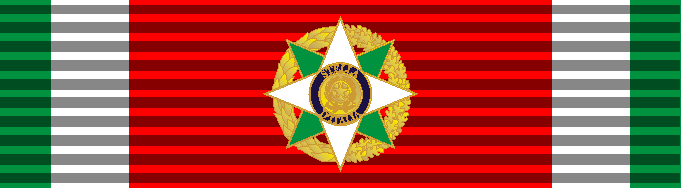
Commendatore dell'Ordine della Stella d'Italia - ribbon for ordinary uniform

Commendatore dell'Ordine della Stella d'Italia
— 9 gennaio 2020

- Primo Tricolore, Reggio Emilia 2011
- Socio onorario della Accademia dei Filopatridi Rubiconia 2018
- Premio Omegna Resistenza 2017
- Premio Capri Storia 2003
- Premio Internazionale 'Francesco Saverio Nitti' 2016
- Premio Capri San Michele 2015
- медаль Пушкина 2012
- Targa Paolo Volponi Bologna 2022
- Loewy Distinguished Professor, Institute of Advanced Studies, Tel Aviv University

== See also ==
- Giuseppe Dossetti
- Pope John XXIII
- Pope John Paul II
- Pope Innocent IV
- Marie-Dominique Chenu
- Dietrich Bonhoeffer
