= Giuseppe Dossetti =

Italian politician and Catholic priest (1913–1996)

The Reverend Giuseppe Dossetti
- Superior of the Piccola Famiglia dell'Annunziata
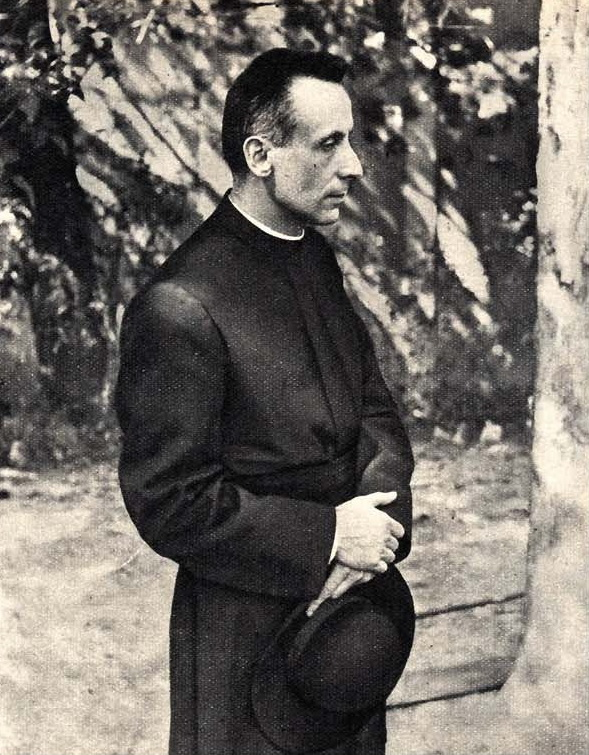
- Fr. Giuseppe Dossetti in 1959
- Church: Catholic Church
- Archdiocese: Bologna
- In office: 1956-1994
- Successor: Athos Righi

Orders
- Ordination: 6 January 1959 by Cardinal Giacomo Lercaro

Personal details
- Born: 13 February 1913 Genoa, Italy
- Died: 15 December 1996 (aged 83) Monteveglio, Italy
- Buried: Cimitero di Casaglia, Marzabotto, Italy
- Denomination: Catholic
- Education: Catholic University of the Sacred Heart, University of Reggio Emilia

Giuseppe Dossetti
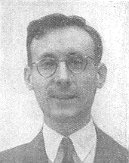

Member of the Chamber of Deputies
- In office 8 May 1948 – 18 July 1952
- Constituency: Parma

Member of the Constituent Assembly
- In office 25 June 1946 – 31 January 1948
- Constituency: Parma

Personal details
- Born: 13 February 1913 Genoa, Italy
- Died: 15 December 1996 (aged 83) Monteveglio, Italy
- Party: Christian Democracy
- Education: Catholic University of the Sacred Heart, University of Reggio Emilia
- Occupation: University professor, jurist

Giuseppe Dossetti (13 February 1913 – 15 December 1996) was an Italian jurist, politician, theologian, and Catholic priest. A prominent anti-fascist and Resistance fighter, Dossetti served as Vice-Secretary of the Christian Democracy, and as a member of the Constituent Assembly of Italy from 1946 to 1948 and the Chamber of Deputies from 1948 to 1952. Around him a movement emerged, known as "Dossettismo", which has continued to influence the Italian political, social, religious, and cultural landscape.

Having left the political arena, Dossetti founded in Bologna a centre of documentation for religious studies, known as the John XXIII Foundation for Religious Studies, and the monastic community Piccola Famiglia dell’Annunziata of male and female cenobites and consecrated spouses, active in the Monte Sole Historical Park of Marzabotto, Monteveglio, Modena, Bonifati, Reggio Emilia, Parma, Verona, Milan, Mantua, and in the Holy Land.

Ordained a priest in 1959, Dossetti participated in the Second Vatican Council as a theological expert (peritus) assisting Cardinal Giacomo Lercaro. In 1963, he became secretary to the Council's four moderators: Cardinals Gregorio Pietro Agagianian, Leo Joseph Suenens, Julius August Döpfner, and Lercaro himself. After the Council, Dossetti moved to Jericho, where he devoted himself entirely to monastic life. Returned to Italy in the final years of his life, he became actively engaged in opposing attempts to reform the Italian Constitution.

== Early life and career ==
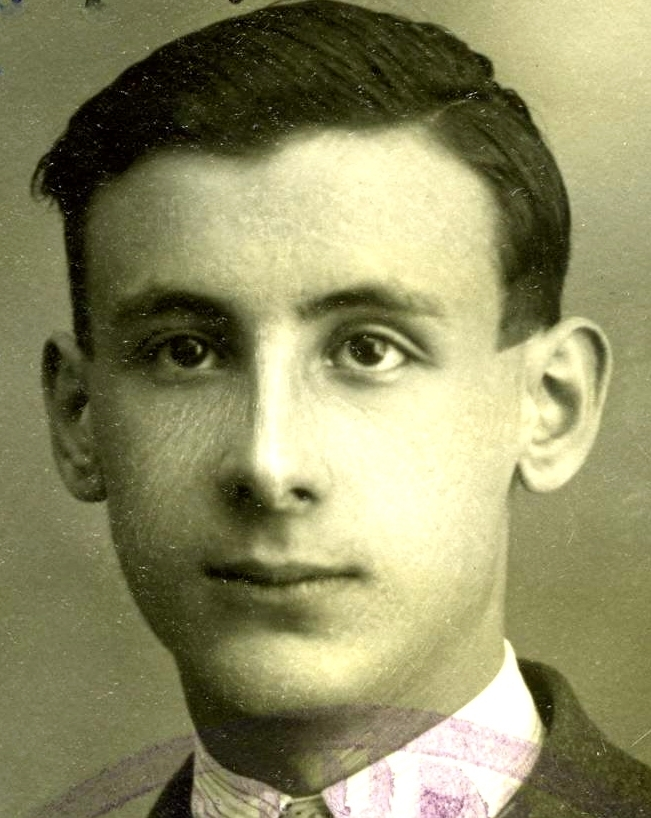
Young Giuseppe Dossetti

Dossetti was born in Genoa on 13 February 1913. His father was from Piedmont and his mother from Emilia. Already in June of the same year, the family moved to Cavriago, a small town near Reggio Emilia, where this father had taken over the local pharmacy. The mother had a very strong spirituality, which she passed on to her children. Dossetti attended secondary school in Reggio Emilia, where he obtained his maturità classica, the classical high school diploma, in 1930.

In those years, Dossetti started an intense activity within the local branch of the lay association Catholic Action, which continued throughout his studies at the University of Reggio Emilia, where he obtained a law degree at age of 21 with a thesis in on domestic violence in Canon Law. At the time, he came into contact with a student environment permeated by loyalty to the ruling Fascist Party, without, however, developing a genuine adherence to its ideology.

In 1934, under the guidance of father Agostino Gemelli, Dossetti moved to Milan to conduct postgraduate work in both Canon and Roman law at the Catholic University of the Sacred Heart. That environment was favorable for an experience as consecrated layperson: in 1936, he was admitted to the Missionaries of the Kingship of Our Lord Jesus Christ, a lay association founded by Gemelli together with bishop Francesco Olgiati, whose lay members, divided into a male and a female branch, consecrated themselves in secret by making a vow of chastity and promises of poverty, obedience, and apostolate. In 1939, Dossetti prepared a memorandum, later sent by Gemelli to Pope Pius XII, on the nature of the associations of lay people consecrated to God while living in the world, which formed the basis of the Pope's decision to recognize secular institutes. In this text, published under Gemelli's own name, Dossetti developed the concept of self-giving and total self-offering, which would greatly influence his later monastic thought. During this phase, Dossetti matured a radically negative judgment of Fascism.

== Member of the italian resistance ==
In 1940, Dossetti became assistant professor of Canon Law at the Catholic University, in the same year when Italy entered World War II. Concerned by the unfolding crisis, he started coordinating a group, including future politicians such as Amintore Fanfani, Giorgio La Pira, and The Venerable Giuseppe Lazzati, who met on Fridays to discuss the events and the desirability of Catholic committed support to the establishment of a democratic political system.

Dossetti was appointed full professor at the University of Modena in 1942. Soon afterwards, the fall of Fascism in 1943 and the Armistice of Cassibile in September 1943, led to Operation Achse, the German occupation of Northern Italy and the outbreak of the Italian Civil War. In the Emilia region, the armed Resistance expanded quickly, and young Catholics looked at Dossetti as a political and intellectual reference. Initially, he believed that Catholics, while supporting the establishment of a democratic regime, should avoid direct participation in armed struggle. Soon, however, he became personally involved in the Resistance together with his brother Ermanno, assuming the battle name "Benigno".

Dossetti entered the Committee for National Liberation (CLN) of his hometown Cavriago and was elected president of the provincial CLN of Reggio Emilia in December 1944. His activity was focused on both clandestine military resistance and of political education, as he sought to give political direction to the Catholic presence within the Resistance. Although he chose to remain an "unarmed partisan," a decision linked to his personal religious commitment as a Franciscan tertiary, by February 1945 he had moved to the Tuscan-Emilian Apennines mountains with the Resistance and, on Easter Sunday, was involved in the Battle of Ca' Marastoni di Toano, a tragic event in which many fighters were killed. Dossetti later recalled this episode several times: two years later in a speech to the Constituent Assembly, again forty years later in an address at the Archiginnasio of Bologna, and also in a passionate letter to Israeli Prime Minister Menachem Begin following the Sabra and Shatila massacre.

After the end of World War II in April 1945, Dossetti was confirmed as president of the CLN of Reggio Emilia, a sign of the prestige he had gained despite the strong presence of the Italian Communist Party among the Resistance fighters.

== Political career ==
After the Liberation, Dossetti emerged as a prominent figure in the newly formed Christian Democracy party (DC). In April 1945 he was appointed a member of the Consulta Nazionale, the advisory body established to assist the government in the transition from Fascism to democratic institutions. Within the DC, he gained national visibility at the first conference of the youth groups in July 1945 and was subsequently elected Vice-Secretary of the party. Once in Rome, he worked to give the DC a stronger ideological foundation and advocated for a clear republican choice in the debate over the future institutional form of the Italian State, a position that brought him into tension with Alcide De Gasperi, who preferred to leave the issue open to avoid alienating monarchist voters.

On 2 June 1946, he was elected a member of the Italian Constituent Assembly, a parliamentary chamber charged with drafting a new Italian constitution, where he served as a member of the Subcommittee on the Rights and Duties of the Citizens and quickly became an influential figure, contributing in particular to the personalist conception of citizenship rights, the definition of the Republic as "founded on labour," (Art. 1) and the emphasis on political parties as pillars of democratic life. With a group of Catholic intellectuals and politicians – Amintore Fanfani, Giorgio La Pira, Giuseppe Lazzati, and Aldo Moro – nicknamed the "professorini," ("the young professors"), he exercised considerable influence over the drafting process. Around that time, Dossetti, Fanfani, Lazzati, and La Pira founded the movement Civitas Humana to promote the formation of a new Catholic political leadership inspired by social reform and democratic participation. The following year Dossetti and Lazzati launched the political review Cronache Sociali, which became the intellectual centre of the reform-oriented current within the DC.

Dossetti was not intentioned to seek reelection in 1948 and changed his mind only at the urging of Monsignor Giovanni Battista Montini, then Substitute for General Affairs to the Vatican Secretariat of State, who later became Pope Paul VI. Indeed, despite his growing influence, Dossetti was increasingly clashing with De Gasperi's more pragmatic leadership. He was actively working on many reforms, including the Cassa del Mezzogiorno, and argued that Christian Democracy should pursue a bold program of social reforms aimed at helping the poorest part of the population, rather than limit itself to contain the rise of the Communist Party. The disagreement emerged in several debates, including foreign policy and the future alignment of Italy in the Cold War. Dossetti initially opposed Italy's accession to NATO, advocating instead for a more independent international position, but he ultimately voted in favour of its ratification in Parliament in 1949.

After briefly serving again as Vice-Secretary of the party, however, he resigned from the leadership in 1951 and left Parliament in 1952, with the intention to withdraw from active political life. He would briefly return to the political arena in 1956, when, at the request of Archbishop Lercaro, he ran unsuccessfully for mayor of Bologna and represented the opposition in the City Council for two years, after which he definitively turned toward religious life and intellectual work.

== Religious life ==
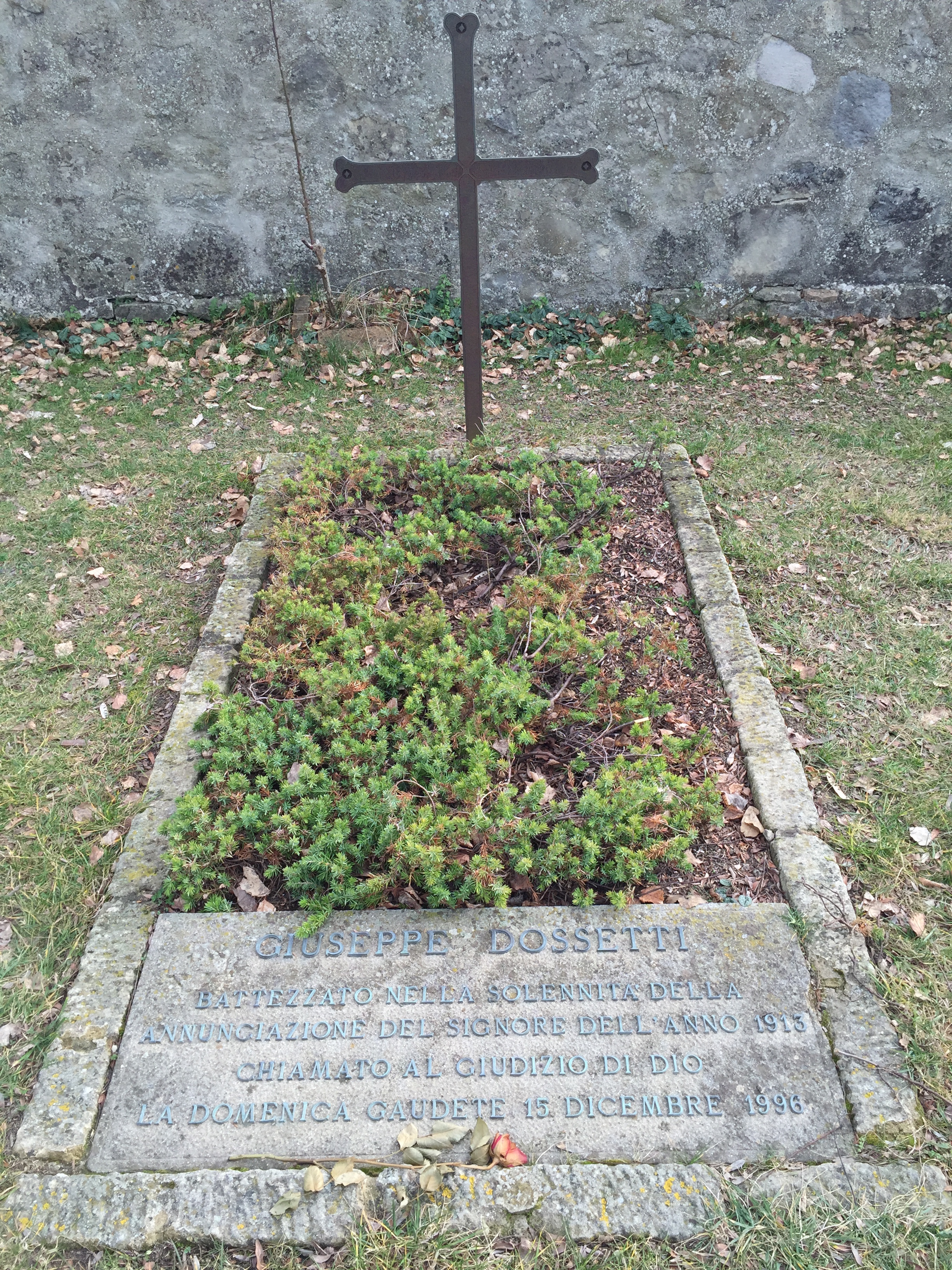
Dossetti's grave, in the cemetery at Monte Sole

In the meantime, on 6 January 1956, he took religious vows. Some months before, the Church authorities approved the monastic community of the Piccola famiglia dell'Annunziata (Little Family of the Annunciation), founded by him and based on "silence, prayer, work, and poverty". After three years, he was ordained a priest.

During the 1960s, he contributed as a collaborator of Cardinal Lercaro, but since his presence was not welcome by some sectors of the ecclesiastical hierarchy, he chose to retire in silence. According to Cardinal Giacomo Biffi, Dossetti's personal role during the Second Vatican Council was of great importance, because he contributed to making the Council less conservative and traditional than what was originally planned.

During the following years, his community expanded: from the first section near Bologna, in Terrasanta, to Giordania in Casaglia di Montesole. He reappeared in public in 1994, when he publicly expressed his worries for the proposed modifications of the Italian constitution. Dossetti died two years later, on 15 December 1996, in Oliveto di Monteveglio.

== Selected works ==
=== Opera omnia ===
- Giuseppe Dossetti. I testi

I, Archivio della famiglia e Lettere alla comunità

I.1, La Piccola famiglia dell'Annunziata. Le origini e i testi fondativi, 1953–1986, Milano, Paoline, 2004. ISBN 88-315-2742-8.
I.2, Lettere alla comunità, 1964–1971, Milano, Paoline, 2006. ISBN 88-315-3051-8.
I.3.1, Discorsi ed esercizi spirituali, Milano, Paoline, 2006. ISBN 88-315-2957-9.

II, Omelie

II.1, Omelie del tempo di Natale, Milano, Paoline, 2004. ISBN 88-315-2736-3.
II.2, Omelie e istruzioni pasquali, 1968–1974, Milano, Paoline, 2005. ISBN 88-315-2780-0.
II.3, Omelie del tempo di Pasqua, Milano, Paoline, 2007. ISBN 978-88-315-3217-4.
II.4, Omelie e istruzioni pasquali, 1975–1978, Milano, Paoline, 2009. ISBN 978-88-315-3575-5.
II.5, Omelie delle feste del Signore, tempo ordinario, Milano, Paoline, 2011. ISBN 978-88-315-4094-0.

III, Discorsi ed esercizi spirituali

III.1, La parola e il silenzio. Discorsi e scritti 1986–1995, Milano, Paoline, 2005. ISBN 88-315-2957-9.

IV, Pensieri e consigli spirituali

IV.1, La coscienza del fine. Appunti spirituali 1939–1955, Milano, Paoline, 2010. ISBN 978-88-315-3830-5.

=== Political writings ===
Dossetti, Giuseppe. Chiesa e Stato democratico. Rome: Servire, 1947.

—. Conversazioni. Milan: In Dialogo, 1994.

—. Costituzione e Resistenza. Rome: Sapere 2000, 1995.

—. Dossetti giovane: Scritti reggiani, 1944–1948. Rome: Cinque Lune, 1982.

—. I discorsi di Giuseppe Dossetti a Palazzo d’Accursio: 30 giugno 1956–30 gennaio 1958. Bologna: Centro Studi Sociali e Amministrativi, 1958.

—. I valori della Costituzione. Reggio Emilia: San Lorenzo, 1995.

—. I valori della Costituzione: Giuseppe Dossetti e Nilde Iotti a Monteveglio. Reggio Emilia: Pozzi, 1995.

—. I valori della Costituzione italiana. Modena: Mucchi, 1995.

—. La Costituzione: Le radici, i valori, le riforme. Rome: Lavoro, 1996.

—. Scritti politici (1943–1951). Giuseppe Trotta, ed. Reggio Emilia: San Lorenzo, 1995.

—. Sentinella, quanto resta della notte? Commemorazione di G. Lazzati nell’anniversario della morte. Reggio Emilia: San Lorenzo, 1994.

—. Sentinella, quanto resta della notte? Riflessioni sulla transizione italiana. Rome: Lavoro, 1994.

Dossetti, Giuseppe, Leonilde Iotti, and Meuccio Ruini. Interventi alla Costituente: Contributi reggiani. Bologna: Analisi, 1986.

Villa, R., ed. Giuseppe Dossetti: Due anni a Palazzo d’Accursio. Discorsi a Bologna 1956–1958. Reggio Emilia: Aliberti, 2004.

=== Religious writings ===
Dossetti, Giuseppe. Credo in un solo Dio Padre onnipotente: Il problema di Dio, il mondo spirituale e l’idolatria, il fine soprannaturale dell’uomo. Reggio Emilia: San Lorenzo, 1990.

—. Credo in un solo Signore Gesù Cristo. Reggio Emilia: San Lorenzo, 1991.

—. Credo in un solo Signore Gesù Cristo: Figlio di Dio crocifisso. Reggio Emilia: San Lorenzo, 1992.

—. Don Gianfranco Magnani: Un prete per la Chiesa e per la città. Cavriago: Tipolitografia Bertani, 1988.

—. Eucaristia e città. Rome: AVE, 1997.

—. Ho imparato a guardare lontano. Cavriago: Comune di Cavriago, 1988.

—. Il Concilio ecumenico Vaticano II: Prolusione inaugurale per l’anno accademico 1994–95 dello Studio teologico interdiocesano di Reggio Emilia. Reggio Emilia: San Lorenzo, 1995.

—. Il viaggio della vita: Un cammino spirituale per uscire dalla tossicodipendenza e diventare uomini. Bologna: EDB, 2003.

—. Il Vaticano II: Frammenti di una riflessione. Bologna: Il Mulino, 1996.

—. L’esegesi spirituale secondo d. Divo Barsotti. Reggio Emilia: San Lorenzo, 1995.

—. Non restare in silenzio, mio Dio. Reggio Emilia: San Lorenzo, 1987.

—. Se tu non-mi parli, io sono come chi scende nella fossa. Reggio Emilia: San Lorenzo, 1988.

Dossetti, Giuseppe. Introduction to Luciano Gherardi. Le querce di Monte Sole: Vita e morte delle comunità martiri fra Setta e Reno, 1898–1944. Bologna: Il Mulino, 1987.

Dossetti, Giuseppe, and Luigi Giussani. Per la vita del mondo. Bologna: Edizioni Dehoniane, 1990.

Dossetti, Giuseppe, and Umberto Neri. La gioia del cristiano. Reggio Emilia: San Lorenzo, 1987.

Martini, Carlo Maria, Giuseppe Dossetti, and Umberto Neri. Come un bambino in braccio alla madre: Atti del Convegno, 17 febbraio 1993. Reggio Emilia: San Lorenzo, 1993.

Piccola Famiglia dell’Annunziata, ed. La parola di Dio seme di vita e di fede incorruttibile. Bologna: EDB, 2002.

—, ed. La parola e il silenzio: Discorsi e scritti 1986–1995. Bologna: Il Mulino, 1997.

—, ed. La Piccola famiglia dell’Annunziata: Le origini e i testi fondativi, 1953–1986. Milan: Paoline Editoriale Libri, 2004.

—, ed. L’identità del cristiano. Bologna: EDB, 2001.

—, ed. Omelie e istruzioni pasquali, 1968–1974. Milan: Paoline Editoriale Libri, 2005.

=== Legal writings ===
Dossetti, Giuseppe. Funzioni e ordinamento dello Stato moderno. Rome: Studium, 1961.

—. Grandezza e miseria del diritto della Chiesa. Bologna: Il Mulino, 1996.

—. Il concetto giuridico dello status religiosus in Sant’Ambrogio. Milan: Vita e Pensiero, 1940.

—. La formazione progressiva del negozio nel matrimonio canonico: Contributo alla dottrina degli sponsali e del matrimonio condizionale. Bologna: Zanichelli, 1954.

—. La violenza nel matrimonio in diritto canonico. Milan: Vita e Pensiero, 1943.

—. Le persone giuridiche ecclesiastiche e il nuovo libro primo del Codice civile. Milan: Vita e Pensiero, 1939.

== Bibliography ==
Fangareggi, Salvatore. Il partigiano Dossetti. Reggio Emilia: Aliberti, 2004.

Forlenza R, Thomassen B. Christian democracy as political spirituality: transcendence as transformation, Italian politics, 1942–1953. Politics and Religion. 2024;17(2):229–249. doi:10.1017/S1755048324000063

Formigoni, Guido. "Padre Gemelli e i ‘professorini’ dell’Università Cattolica nel secondo dopoguerra: note su un carteggio." In Temi e questioni di storia economica e sociale in età moderna e contemporanea. Studi in onore di Sergio Zaninelli, edited by A. Carera, M. Taccolini, and R. Canetta. Milano: IULM, 1999.

Galavotti, Enrico. Il giovane Dossetti: Gli anni della formazione, 1913–1939. Bologna: Il Mulino, 2006.

—. Il professorino: Giuseppe Dossetti tra crisi del fascismo e costruzione della democrazia, 1940–1948. Bologna: Il Mulino, 2013.

—. "Il dossettismo: Dinamismi, prospettive e damnatio memoriae di un’esperienza politica e culturale." In Cristiani d’Italia. Rome: Istituto della Enciclopedia Italiana, 2011.

—. "Sulla formazione di Giuseppe Dossetti: Appunti per una ricerca." In Giuseppe Dossetti: Studies on an Italian Catholic Reformer, edited by Alberto Melloni and Guido Fanti, 3–21. Münster: LIT Verlag, 2008.

Galloni, Giovanni. Dossetti: Profeta del nostro tempo. Rome: Editori Riuniti University Press, 2011.

Giorgi, Luigi. Una vicenda politica: Giuseppe Dossetti, 1945–1956. Milan: Edizioni Scriptorium, 2003.

—. Giuseppe Dossetti: La politica come missione. Rome: Carocci, 2023.

Lazzati, Giuseppe. Lazzati, Dossetti, il dossettismo. Rome: AVE, 1997.

Mandreoli, Fabrizio. Giuseppe Dossetti. Trento: Il Margine, 2012.

Mandreoli, Fabrizio, and Elisa Dondi. Giuseppe Dossetti e Divo Barsotti: Carteggio 1953–1995. Bologna: Il Mulino, 2014.

Marson, O., and R. Villa, eds. Giuseppe Dossetti: Il circuito delle due parole. Bologna: Nuova Dimensione, 2000.

Melloni, Alberto and Guido Fanti, eds., Giuseppe Dossetti: Studies on an Italian Catholic Reformer. Münster: LIT Verlag, 2008.

Paradiso, Cesare, and Pietro M. Fragnelli. Giuseppe Dossetti: Sentinella e discepolo. Rome: Paoline Editoriale Libri, 2010.

Peri, Vittorio. La Pira, Lazzati, Dossetti: Nel silenzio la speranza. Rome: Studium, 1998.

Pombeni, Paolo. Giuseppe Dossetti. Bologna: Il Mulino, 2013.

—. "Dossetti, Giuseppe." In Dizionario Biografico degli Italiani. Rome: Istituto dell’Enciclopedia Italiana, 2012.

Saba, Vincenzo. Quella specie di laburismo cristiano: Dossetti, Pastore, Romani e l’alternativa a De Gasperi (1946–1951). Rome: Edizioni Lavoro, 1996.

Tancini, M., ed. Fondo «Cronache Sociali» 1947–1952: Con annessi documenti del vicesegretario della Democrazia Cristiana (1945–1951) Giuseppe Dossetti. Bologna: Il Mulino, 2002.

Tesini, Mario. Oltre la città rossa: L’alternativa mancata di Dossetti a Bologna (1956–1958). Bologna: Il Mulino, 1986.
