= Edward A. Romano =

American entertainment executive

- Born: United States
- Education: St. John the Baptist Elementary School; St. John's Preparatory School (Queens)
- Alma mater: St. John's University
- Occupation: Film Executive
- Employer: Warner Bros.
- Title: Executive Advisor to the Chairman

Edward A. Romano is an American entertainment executive. Romano retired as the Vice Chairman of Warner Bros. in June 2016, ending a 48-year career with the studio. He currently serves as the Executive Advisor to the Chairman & CEO.

== Early life ==
Edward A. Romano grew up in Brooklyn, New York City. He was educated at St. John the Baptist Elementary School and St. John's Preparatory School (Queens). He graduated from St. John's University with a bachelor of science degree in accounting in 1963.

== Career ==
Romano begun his career at Peat, Marwick, Mitchell & Co., an accounting firm (now part of KPMG), where he worked from 1963 to 1968.

Romano started working at Warner Bros in 1968. Over the years, he worked as "Assistant Treasurer, Controller, Vice President & Controller, and Senior Vice President & Controller." He served as its Executive Vice President & Chief Financial Officer from 1994 to 2014. Since December 2014, he has served as its Vice Chairman.

Romano is a member of the Academy of Motion Pictures Arts & Sciences and the Academy of Television Arts & Sciences.

== Philanthropy ==
Romano served on the board of directors of the Literacy Network of Greater Los Angeles. He serves on the board of governors of the Providence Saint Joseph Medical Center in Burbank.

Romano has made charitable contributions to his alma mater, St. John's University, as he is both a member of the McCallen Society and the Loughlin Society, two giving societies associated with the university. He received an honorary Doctor of Commercial Science degree in 2008 and a Medal of Honor in May 2015.

== Personal life ==
Romano is a Roman Catholic. He is married and has two children and one grandchild.
