= Antonio Romano =

Antonio Romano may refer to:

- Antonio Romano (composer) (fl. 1400 – 1432), Italian composer
- Antonio Romano (footballer, born 1995), Italian professional footballer
- Antonio Romano (footballer, born 1996), Italian football player
- Antonio Romano (musician) (born 1962), Argentine thrash metal guitarist

== See also ==
- Tony Romano (disambiguation)
