= John Romano =

John or Johnny Romano may refer to:

- John Romano (physician) (1908–1994), American physician and psychiatrist
- John Romano (writer) (born 1948), screenwriter and producer
- Johnny Romano (1934–2019), American baseball player
- Jon Romano (born 1987), TikTok influencer and convicted school shooter
