= Antonella Romano =

French historian of science (born 1962)

Antonella Romano (born 1962) is a French historian of science known for her research on science and the Catholic Church, and in particular on the scientific and mathematical work of the Society of Jesus (Jesuits) in the Renaissance. She is full professor (Directrice d’études) at the Alexandre Koyré Centre for research in the history of science at the School for Advanced Studies in the Social Sciences (EHESS) in Paris, the former director of the center, and a vice-president of EHESS.

== Education ==
Romano attended the Académie de Nancy-Metz and earned a baccalauréat in 1980. She went to Paris-Sorbonne University for her undergraduate studies, earned a master's degree in history and a licence in geography in 1984, and then earned a diplôme d'études approfondies in 1989 at the University of Paris 1 Pantheon-Sorbonne, studying the scientific contributions of the Jesuits under the supervision of Daniel Roche. Continuing with Roche, she completed a doctorate in 1996; her dissertation was Les jésuites et la révolution scientifique. In 2013 she earned a habilitation at the School for Advanced Studies in the Social Sciences. Her habilitation thesis was Europe catholique, sciences, mission à l’époque moderne.

== Career ==
She taught in the Académie d'Amiens from 1985 until 1994, and worked from 1994 until 1997 at the Ecole Française de Rome. In 1997 she became a researcher at the Alexandre Koyré Centre, and in 2005 she went on leave from the center to take a chair in the history of sciences at the European University Institute in Florence. In 2013 she returned to the Alexandre Koyré Centre as a director of studies, and in 2014 she became the director of the center.

From 2018 to 2020 she has been vice-president for international relations of the School for Advanced Studies in the Social Sciences.

== Selected works ==
=== Books ===
- Impressions de Chine: L’Europe et l’englobement du monde (16e-17e siècles) (Fayard, 2016; Spanish translation Impressiones de China: Europa y el englobamiento del mundo, Marcial Pons, 2018)
- La contre-réforme mathématique: Constitution et diffusion d’une culture mathématique jésuite à la Renaissance (1540-1640) [The mathematical Counter-Reformation: Constitution and diffusion of a Jesuit mathematical culture during the Renaissance (1540–1640)] (École française de Rome, 1999)

=== Edited volumes ===
- Rome et la science moderne: Entre Renaissance et Lumières (École française de Rome, 2008)
- Escrituras de la modernidad: Los jesuitas entre cultura retórica y cultura científica (edited with Perla Chinchilla, Univ. Iberoamericana / EHESS, 2008)
- Naples, Rome, Florence: Une histoire comparée des intellectuels italiens (edited with Jean Boutier and Brigitte Marin, École française de Rome, 2005)

=== Translations ===
She has also translated a book by Paolo Prodi into French as Christianisme et monde moderne: Cinquante ans de recherches (EHESS, 2006).

== Recognition ==
In 2001, Romano won the prize for young historians of the International Academy of the History of Science for her book La contre-réforme mathématique. She became a corresponding member of the academy in 2019.

Romano was given the Médaille de la Ville de Tours in 2012 "for her work on Renaissance studies".
