= Alfredo Romano Jr =

Argentine economist

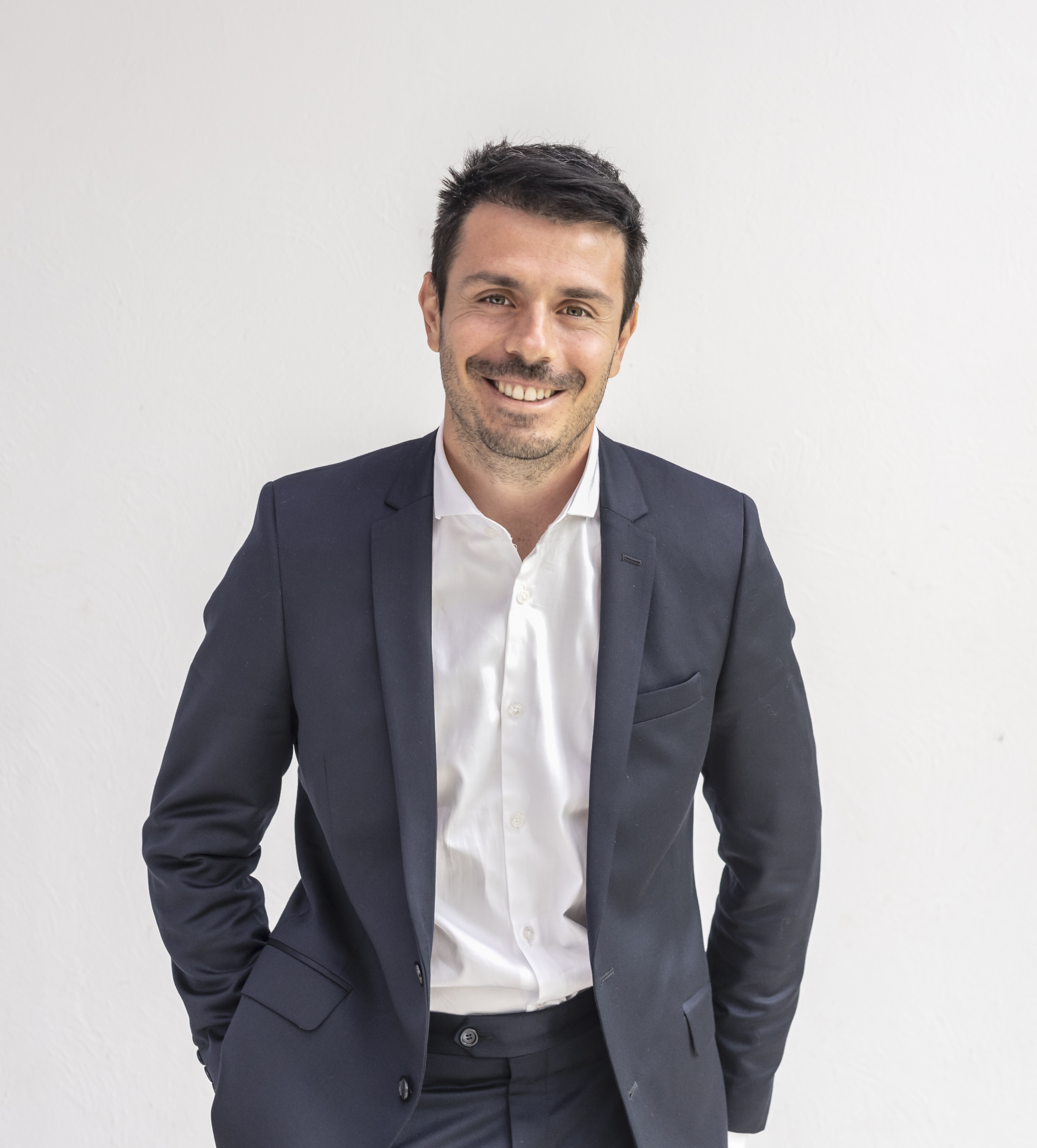
- Born: 1988 (age 37–38); Mendoza, Argentina
- Education: Master of Public Administration in Economic Policy Management, Columbia University (2018)
- Occupations: Entrepreneur, professor and philanthropist
- Employer: Austral University (Argentina)
- Notable work: "Dolarizar, un camino hacia la estabilidad económica" (2021)

Alfredo Romano Jr (Mendoza, 1988) is an Argentine businessman, professor, philanthropist, and co-creator of "Fundación El Potrero". In his youth, he was a soccer player at Paris St.Germain (2006). He is an independent economist in favor of dollarization of the economy, author of the essay Dolarizar, un camino hacia la estabilidad económica (Literally Dollarization, a path to economic stability). He collaborates as an analyst in several media.

== Academic career ==
He studied business administration at University of San Andrés. He obtained a master's degree in finance (2015) from the same university, and the "Master of Public Administration in Economic Policy Management" from Columbia University (2018).

He achieved a scholarship from the Wharton School of the University of Pennsylvania, and was also a fellow of the Frankfurt School of Finance & Management in Germany. At Universidad Austral, he created, in 2020, together with Soledad Castro and Gabriel Chaufan, the capital markets degree program at the School of Economics, and has been its director since then. He teaches the subject "The Fund" in the Business Administration degree.

== Professional development ==
He has been president of the Romano Group since 2012 and co-founder of the Instituto Argentino de Ejecutivos de Finanzas based in Cuyo, a non-profit organization focused on the professional development of executives and managers.

In 2013, together with a group of friends, he created "Fundación El Potrero". This foundation develops its activity in vulnerable neighbourhoods in the province of Buenos Aires and other places in Argentina. Declared of public interest by the Legislature of Buenos Aires, it promotes the integral development of young people in studies and sports such as soccer, and also supports families. Several young soccer players from "Los Potreros" were hired by some first division clubs, such as Vélez, Tigre, Nueva Chicago, Lanús, and Platense. During the pandemic, he promoted the virtual school support platform "Entretiempo".

As an economist, he is a strong detractor of bimonetarism, standing up for the dollarization of the economy in different forums and in several media. His monetary ideas are expressed in the essay "Dolarizar, un camino hacia la estabilidad económica" (2021) published by El Ateneo with a prologue by Sergio Berensztein.

He is a contributor to MDZ Radio, the digital publication Infobae, Ambito magazine, and La Nación newspaper.
