= Giordania =

Scientific classification
- Domain: Eukaryota
- Kingdom: Animalia
- Phylum: Arthropoda
- Class: Insecta
- Order: Hymenoptera
- Family: Vespidae
- Subfamily: Eumeninae
- Genus: Giordania; Gusenleitner, 1995

Species
- Giordania nigra Gusenleitner, 1995; Giordania subventricosa (Giordani Soika, 1941)

Genus of wasps

Giordania is a small Malagasy genus of potter wasps. The genus was created by Josef Gusenleitner in 1995.
