= Romano Amerio =

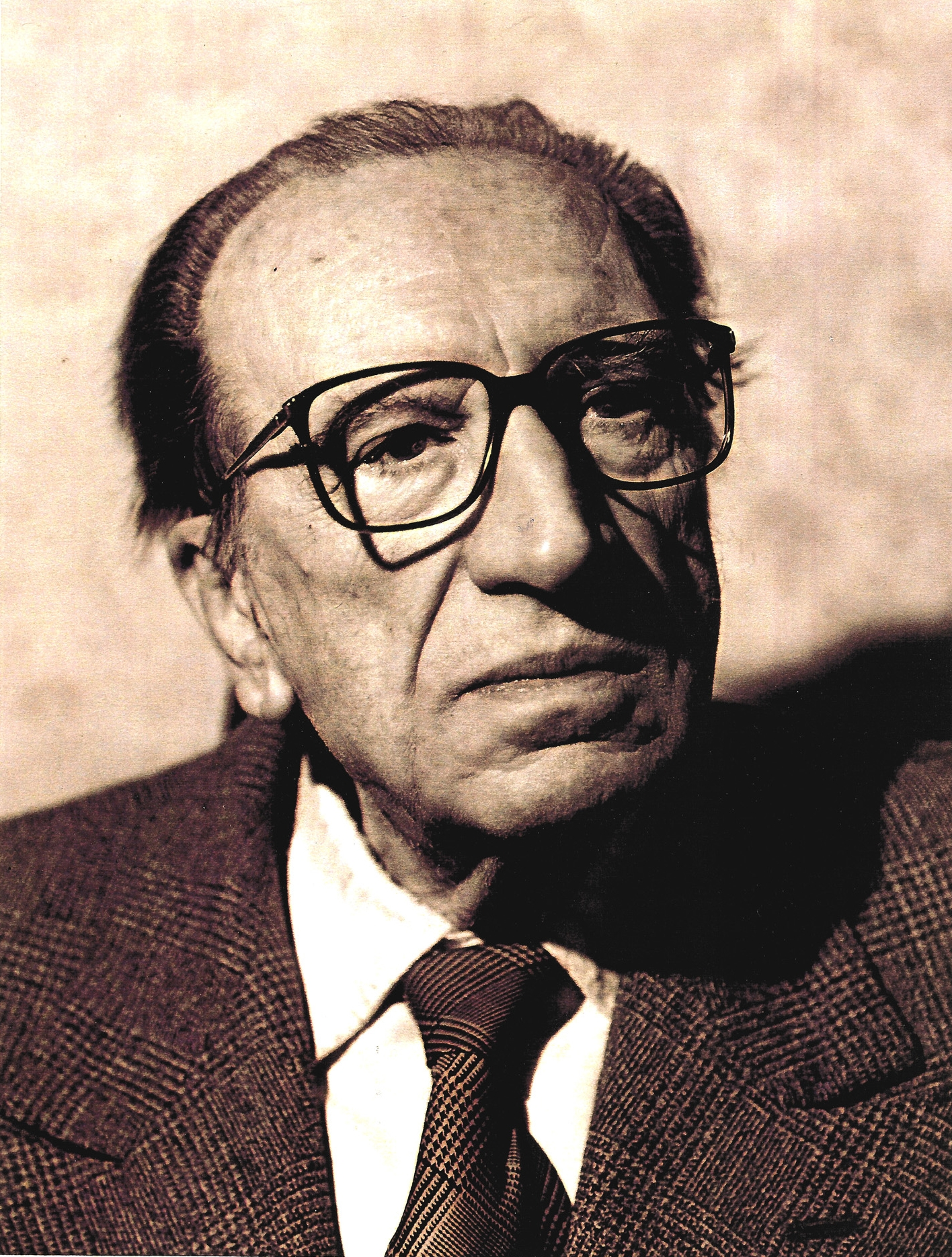
Romano Amerio

Romano Amerio (17 January 1905 – 16 January 1997) was a Swiss-Italian theologian and a late critic of post-Conciliar evolutions in liturgy and ecclesiology. His magnum opus is Iota Unum. It is a work dedicated to the study of the ruptures in Church teaching and tradition following the Second Vatican Council.

== Education and teaching ==
Amerio was born in Lugano. He obtained a doctorate in philosophy from the Catholic University of Milan in 1927. He was a disciple of Fr. Gemelli, the founder of the University. He had studied in detail the philosophy of 17th-century Italian poet Tommaso Campanella, of whose work he later became a professional scholar. He is also known for his study of Antonio Rosmini and for producing a critical edition of the work of Alessandro Manzoni.

After receiving his doctorate, he taught philosophy and Greco-Roman classics at the Academy of Lugano in Switzerland.

== Peritus at Vatican Council II ==
Amerio was taken to the Vatican Council as a peritus of Angelo Giuseppe Jelmini, Apostolic Administrator of the Diocese of Lugano and Titular Bishop of Thermae Basilicae. Since Jelmini was a member of the Central Preparatory Commission, Amerio was able to view all the schemata and write comments on behalf of Jelmini. Twenty years after the end of the Council, as he grew more and more critical of the discontinuity in doctrine and discipline promoted in the name of the Council by certain groups, he wrote Iota Unum.

== Thought ==
In his writings, Amerio identifies three syllabuses which he says were implicitly and intellectually negated during the post-conciliar period: the encyclical Quanta cura of Pope Pius IX, condemning liberalism and Masonic ideology, the decree Lamentabili sane exitu by Pope Pius X, concerning radical biblical criticism, and the encyclical Humani generis by Pope Pius XII, which reproves new ecclesial anthropologies and ecclesiologies.

Amerio was also opposed to liturgical creativity, and his thought on this issue was essentially in line with the encyclical Mediator Dei of Pius XII, which precisely held that liturgy was a cultus, and not so much a self-celebration. Amerio also examined institutional changes in the Holy Office and felt that the formal abandonment of the term heresy in official enquiries and procedures had dramatic consequences on Church life, studies and Christian academics.

Amerio was a promoter of apologetics and was dismayed by the abandonment of notions of conversion and disputation in favour of a purely dialectic approach between Church and World. He held to traditional Thomism and Augustinianism and deeply disliked the common embrace of Kantism, Hegelianism and Spinozism among many Christian intellectuals.

Amerio's essays were praised by traditional scholars in the Church, although they came at a difficult time for him because of the then-public conflict between archbishop Marcel Lefebvre of the traditionalist Society of St. Pius X and Pope Paul VI. As such, his 1980s research and books were largely ignored and neglected by leaders inside the institutional Church but have been revived and received new respect in recent years. Amerio died in 1997.

Amerio is thought to have been at least partially rehabilitated during the papacy of Pope Benedict XVI. Thus Caritas in Veritate, a 2009 encyclical dedicated to Charity and Truth, explores ideas and concepts that were at the very heart of Amerio's theological and philosophical career.

== See also ==
- Hermeneutics of the Second Vatican Council

== Principal works ==
- Arbitrarismo divino, libertà umana e implicanze teologiche nella dottrina di Cartesio, Milano, Società Editrice "Vita e Pensiero", 1937
- L'epicureimo, Torino, Edizioni di filosofia, 1953
- Tommaso Campanella, Della necessità di una filosofia cristiana, prima traduzione italiana con introduzione e commento a cura di Romano Amerio, Torino, Società Editrice Internazionale, 1953
- Opere di Giordano Bruno e di Tommaso Campanella, a cura di Augusto Guzzo e di Romano Amerio, Milano-Napoli, R. Ricciardi, 1956
- Alessandro Manzoni filosofo e teologo: studio delle dottrine seguito da un'appendice di lettere, postille e carte inedite, Torino, Edizioni di filosofia, 1958
- Il sistema teologico di Tommaso Campanella: studio di editi ed inediti con appendici e indici, Milano, Napoli, R. Ricciardi, 1972
- Iota Unum. Studio delle variazioni della Chiesa Cattolica nel secolo XX, Milano-Napoli, R. Ricciardi, 1985; poi Torino, Lindau, 2009; Verona, Fede & Cultura, 2009
  - Iota Unum: A Study of Changes in the Catholic Church in the XXth Century (Angelus Press) ISBN 9780963903211
  - Iota Unum - Um Estudo das Mudanças na Igreja Católica no Século XX ISBN 9786587499017
- Stat veritas - Milano-Napoli, R. Ricciardi, 1997; poi Stat veritas. Seguito a Iota unum , Torino, Lindau, 2009
