= Giuseppe Alberigo =

Italian Catholic historian (1926 – 2007)

Giuseppe Alberigo (Cuasso al Monte, 21 January 1926 – Bologna, 15 June 2007) was an Italian Catholic historian and editor of a history of the Second Vatican Council that focuses on alleged discontinuities and departures from previous Church teaching.

== Biography ==
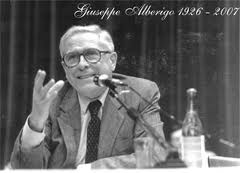
Giuseppe Alberigo

Giuseppe Alberigo received a graduate degree in law, studying under the German historian Hubert Jedin, under Delio Cantimori in Florence. and under the diocesan vicar and monk Giuseppe Dossetti who was one of the most influential progressives at the Second Vatican Council.

Alberigo's most important work was the direction of the editorial initiative Storia del Concilio Vaticano II, but its progressive character did not have unanimous acceptance among Catholics, with critical reviews appearing in L'Osservatore Romano. The work of Giuseppe Alberigo and the "School of Bologna" is criticized because it supports the hermeneutics of discontinuity, an interpretation of the Second Vatican Council which considers it a crucial event that marks a turning point in the history of the Catholic Church.

Following the presentation of the bill on the "Rights and duties of people living together" (DiCo) presented by the ministers Rosy Bindi and Barbara Pollastrini and the criticisms coming from the ecclesiastical hierarchy, on 13 February 2007 Alberigo promoted a public appeal in which he invited the Episcopal Conference of Italy to not intervene in a proposal for an official vote among Italian Catholic politicians. The bill has never been approved.

On 20 April 2007, after his admission to the hospital Policlinico Sant'Orsola-Malpighi, Alberigo's relatives were informed by the Bologna Prefect Vincenzo Grimaldi that the President of the Republic Giorgio Napolitano had conferred on him the honor of a Knight of the Grand Cross of the Italian Republic, saying that his was "an authoritative voice emphasizing with critical awareness the importance of the contribution of Catholic culture in the debate on ideas in our country.

== Works ==
- Giuseppe Dossetti. Un itinerario spirituale, in collaboration with Melloni Alberto, Ravignani Eugenio Edizioni Nuova Dimensione, 2006
- Breve storia del concilio Vaticano II (1959-1965), Il Mulino editions, 2005
- Papa Giovanni (1881-1963), EDB editions, 2000
- Dalla laguna al Tevere. Angelo Giuseppe Roncalli da S. Marco a San Pietro, Il Mulino editions, 2000
- Storia del Concilio Vaticano II [vol 4], Ed. Il Mulino, 1999
- Il Concilio adulto. Il secondo periodo e la seconda intersessione (Settembre 1963-settembre 1964), Il Mulino, 1998
- Il cristianesimo in Italia, Edizioni Laterza, 1997
- Chiesa santa e peccatrice, Edizioni Qiqajon, 1997
- Il concilio di Trento. Istanze di riforma e aspetti dottrinali in collaboration with Scarpati Claudio, Alberigo Giuseppe Edizioni Vita e Pensiero, 1997
- Il cristianesimo in Italia, Mondadori, 1992
- La pace: dono e profezia in collaboration with Enzo Bianchi, Carlo Maria Martini, Edizioni Qiqajon, 1991, 2nd ed.
- Storia dei concili ecumenici (cur.), Editrice Queriniana, 1990.
- La riforma protestante. Origini e cause, Editrice Queriniana, 1988, 2nd ed.

== Honour ==
- Italy: Knight Grand Cross of the Order of Merit of the Italian Republic (18 April 2007)

== See also ==
- Hermeneutics of the Second Vatican Council
