= Robert E. Romano =

American politician and lawyer

Robert E. Romano (January 27, 1905–September 7, 1956) was an American politician and lawyer.

Romano was born in Chicago, Illinois. He went to St. Patrick Grammar School and to St. Ignatius College Prep in Chicago. He served in the United States Army Air Corps during World War II. Romano went to the University of Michigan and the DePaul University College of Law. He was admitted to the Illinois bar and practiced law in Chicago. Romano was involved with the Democratic Party. He served in the Illinois House of Representatives from 1951 until his death in 1956. Romano died at his hotel apartment in Chicago, Illinois from a spleen ailment.
