= Tony Romano (ice hockey) =

American ice hockey player

- Born: January 5, 1988 (age 38) Smithtown, New York, U.S.
- Height: 5 ft 11 in (180 cm)
- Weight: 185 lb (84 kg; 13 st 3 lb)
- Position: Center
- Shot: Right
- Played for: Bridgeport Sound Tigers; Vienna Capitals; Västerås HK; Malmö Redhawks; Lørenskog IK; Odense Bulldogs; Stavanger Oilers
- NHL draft: 178th overall, 2006; New Jersey Devils
- Playing career: 2009–2018

Tony Romano (born January 5, 1988) is an American former professional ice hockey player from Smithtown, New York. He is last played for Stavanger Oilers of the Norwegian GET-ligaen.

== Playing career ==
Romano was drafted by the New Jersey Devils in the sixth round (178th overall pick) of the 2006 NHL entry draft. Prior to the draft, Romano graduated from St. Anthony's High School on Long Island, and played for the New York Bobcats of the Atlantic Junior Hockey League, scoring 50 goals in the 2005–06 season. After being drafted, he spent the following year playing for Cornell University, where he led the team's rookies with a total of nine goals and ten assists.

Romano then went on to play for the London Knights of the Ontario Hockey League during the 2007–08 season, citing the switch in leagues due to his limited number of games played in Cornell. Romano didn't play well during this season, partially due to off-season shoulder surgery. Romano played for the Peterborough Petes in the following season, where he scored 36 goals in 65 games. He was the team's leading scorer for the season.

On June 30, 2009, Romano was traded from the New Jersey Devils to the New York Islanders in exchange for Ben Walter and a conditional 2012 draft pick. After being traded, Romano attended the Islanders' "mini-camp," where many of the younger Islanders players began training together. Regarding joining the Islanders, Romano said, "I’ve put in a lot of time through the years. I’ve worked hard all my life, and to possibly be one phone call away from playing with them is a great feeling. I’m a hometown kid and this is the team I grew up idolizing. Pierre Turgeon was my favorite player, and I remember going to the game when they retired Bryan Trottier’s number. It’s just real comforting to be here and be close to home."

After beginning the 2009–10 season with the Bridgeport Sound Tigers of the American Hockey League, he was assigned to the Utah Grizzlies of the ECHL on December 8, 2009.

After three seasons with Sound Tigers, Romano signed a one-year deal with Austrian EBEL side Vienna Capitals. After one season in the EBEL, Romano played two years in the Swedish second-tier HockeyAllsvenskan with Västerås and Malmö Redhawks. After one year playing in Norway, Romano signed a one-year contract with the Odense Bulldogs of the Danish Metal Ligaen in July 2016.

== Career statistics ==
			Regular season					Playoffs
Season	Team	League	GP	G	A	Pts	PIM	GP	G	A	Pts	PIM
2004–05	New York Bobcats	AtJHL	34	34	29	63	28	2	3	5	8	0
2005–06	New York Bobcats	AtJHL	40	50	52	102	38	2	4	1	5	0
2006–07	Cornell University	ECAC	29	9	10	19	18	—	—	—	—	—
2007–08	London Knights	OHL	66	12	10	22	40	4	1	0	1	0
2008–09	Peterborough Petes	OHL	65	36	33	69	86	2	2	1	3	4
2009–10	Bridgeport Sound Tigers	AHL	21	1	1	2	12	—	—	—	—	—
2009–10	Utah Grizzlies	ECHL	34	9	15	24	35	—	—	—	—	—
2009–10	Toledo Walleye	ECHL	12	6	6	12	19	4	1	0	1	4
2010–11	Bridgeport Sound Tigers	AHL	67	7	12	19	56	—	—	—	—	—
2011–12	Bridgeport Sound Tigers	AHL	60	12	22	34	29	2	0	1	1	12
2011–12	Chicago Express	ECHL	3	0	0	0	0	—	—	—	—	—
2012–13	Vienna Capitals	EBEL	37	13	16	29	24	15	3	1	4	38
2013–14	VIK Västerås	Allsv	49	16	16	32	24	10	0	3	3	4
2014–15	Malmö Redhawks	Allsv	44	9	5	14	20	9	1	1	2	2
2015–16	Lørenskog IK	NOR	39	17	38	55	55	17	6	9	15	6
2016–17	Odense Bulldogs	DEN	42	28	26	54	47	4	4	2	6	12
2017–18	Stavanger Oilers	NOR	11	3	3	6	0	—	—	—	—	—
AHL totals			148	20	35	55	97	2	0	1	1	12
