= Roma =

Roma or ROMA may refer to:

== Arts and media ==
=== Film and television ===
- Roma (1972 film), an Italian film by Federico Fellini
- Roma (2004 film), an Argentinian film by Adolfo Aristarain
- Roma (2018 film), a Mexican film by Alfonso Cuarón
- Roma (Don character), a fictional character in the Don film series

=== Literature ===
- Roma (novel), 2007, by Steven Saylor about Ancient Rome
- Roma (comics), a Marvel comics character

=== Music ===
- Roma (band), an American glam rock band
- Roma Symphony (Bizet), a 19th-century symphony by Georges Bizet
- Roma (opera), 1912, by Jules Massenet
- Roma, a 1991 album by Terry Ronald
- "Roma" (Cameron Cartio song), 2005
- "Roma" (Luis Fonsi and Laura Pausini song), 2024

=== Other uses in arts and media ===
- Roma (game), a 1986 board game

== Businesses and organizations ==
=== Companies ===
- Roma Revolving Restaurant, in Durban, South Africa
- ROMA Design Group, a San Francisco-based interdisciplinary design firm
- Tony Roma's, an American chain restaurant

=== Political parties ===
- Party of the Roma, a political party in Romania
- Roma Party, a political party in Serbia

== Food ==
- Roma rice, an Italian cultivated variety of rice particularly suitable for risotto
- Roma tomato, a plum tomato commonly found in supermarkets

== People ==
=== Names ===
- Roma (given name), a female given name
- Roma (surname), (and list of people with the name)
- Roman (given name), or Roma, a male given name
- Roman (surname), (and list of people with the name)

=== Ethnic groups ===
- Romani people or Roma, living mostly in Europe and the Americas

=== Individuals ===
- Roma called Roy, ancient Egyptian High Priest of Amun
- Roma (footballer, born 1979), born Paulo Marcel Pereira Merabet, Brazilian football forward
- Roma (footballer, born 1985), born Juliano Laurentino dos Santos, Brazilian football winger
- Sister Roma or Michael Williams (born 1962), American drag performer and director

== Places ==
=== Africa ===
- Roma, Lesotho, in the Maseru District
- Roma (constituency), a parliamentary constituency of Lusaka District, Zambia

=== Australia ===
- Roma, Queensland, a town
  - Electoral district of Roma, defunct
  - Town of Roma, defunct town, now part of the Maranoa Regional Council
- Roma Street, Brisbane, a street in Queensland

=== Europe ===
- Rome or Roma, the capital of Italy
- Ancient Rome or Roma
- Roma (Lisbon Metro), a Green Line station on Avenida de Roma, Lisbon, Portugal
- Roma (Requena), a village in Valencia, Spain
- Roma, Botoșani, a commune in Romania
- Roma, Gotland, a town in Sweden
- La Roma, a fossil site in Aragon, Spain

=== North America ===
- Roma, Texas, a town in the US
  - Roma Creek, Texas, a census-designated place
  - Roma Independent School District
- Colonia Roma, a neighbourhood in Mexico City, Mexico

=== South America ===
- Roma, Peru, a town in La Libertad Region
- Mata Roma, a municipality in the state of Maranhão, Brazil
- Roma Negra, a nickname of the city of Salvador, Bahia, Brazil

=== Other places ===
- 472 Roma, the asteroid "Roma", the 472nd asteroid registered, a main belt asteroid

== Sports ==
=== Athletes ===
- Roma (footballer, born 1979), born Paulo Marcel Pereira Merabet, Brazilian football forward
- Roma (footballer, born 1985), born Juliano Laurentino dos Santos, Brazilian football winger

=== Sports teams ===
- A.S. Roma, a football team in Rome, Italy
  - A.S. Roma (Superleague Formula team), auto racing team associated with above
  - A.S. Roma Futsal, futsal team associated with above
  - AS Roma (women), women's division of the team
- Dallas Roma F.C., a soccer team in Dallas, Texas, US
- M. Roma Volley, a volleyball team in Rome, Italy
- Roma Esporte Apucarana, a football team in Apucarana, Paraná, Brazil
- Roma S.C., a defunct soccer team in Paterson, New Jersey, US
- Roma United, a football club in the Cayman Islands
- Rugby Roma Olimpic, a rugby team in Rome, Italy

=== Sporting events ===
- Premio Roma, a horse race in Rome, Italy
- Roma Cup, a horse race in Perth, Western Australia, Australia
- Roma Golf Open, a golf tournament in Rome, Italy
- Roma Masters, a defunct golf tournament in Rome, Italy
- Roma Open, a tennis tournament in Rome, Italy

== Transportation ==
=== Ships ===
- Italian ironclad Roma, an armoured steam frigate commissioned in 1865
- Italian battleship Roma (1907), a predreadnought battleship of the Regina Elena class
- Italian battleship Roma (1940), a battleship of the Vittorio Veneto class
- SS Roma (1926)
- MV Doulos or SS Roma

=== Other vehicles ===
- Roma (airship), a US army airship (Italian ex-T34) which crashed on February 21, 1922
- Ferrari Roma (automobile), grand touring sports car manufactured by Italian automobile manufacturer Ferrari

== Other uses ==
- Roma (personification), a goddess in ancient Rome
- ROMA or Representational Oligonucleotide Microarray Analysis, a genomics technology
- 472 Roma, the asteroid "Roma", the 472nd asteroid registered, a main belt asteroid

== See also ==
- Romas (disambiguation)
- Nova Roma (disambiguation)
- Rome (disambiguation)
- Romaic
- Romanus (disambiguation)
  - Aromanians
  - Romagna
    - Romagnol language
  - Romain (disambiguation)
  - Romaine (disambiguation)
  - Roman (disambiguation)
    - Romanesco (disambiguation)
    - Romanesque (disambiguation)
  - Romana (disambiguation)
  - Romand
    - Romandy
  - Romania (disambiguation)
    - Romanian (disambiguation)
  - Romanicus
    - Romance (disambiguation)
    - Romanza (disambiguation)
    - Romance languages (Romanic)
  - Romanization (disambiguation)
  - Romano (disambiguation)
  - Romansh language
- Rûm
  - Rumelia
