= Istanbul (disambiguation) =

Istanbul is Turkey's largest city.

Istanbul may also refer to:

== Arts and entertainment ==
=== Films ===
- Istanbul (film), a 1957 American drama
- Istanbul, a 1985 Belgian film by Marc Didden

=== Games ===
- Istanbul (board game)

=== Literature ===
- Istanbul (novel), a novel in the Killmaster series
- Istanbul: Memories and the City, a memoir by Orhan Pamuk

=== Music ===
- "Istanbul" (Morrissey song) (2014)
- "Istanbul (Not Constantinople)", a swing-style song with lyrics by Jimmy Kennedy and music by Nat Simon
- Istanbul cymbals, two Turkish instrument brands
  - Istanbul Agop Cymbals
- "Instanbul", song by Jay Chou from the 2000 album Jay
- "İstanbul", a 2016 instrumental track by REVen-G

== Education ==
- Istanbul Technical University, an international technical university founded in 1773
- Istanbul University, a university in Turkey

== Places ==
- Greater Istanbul
- Historic Areas of Istanbul
- Istanbul Province
- Istanbul Square, Lahore, Pakistan
- Istanbul Vilayet, a historical administrative division in the Ottoman Empire

== Sports ==
- İstanbul Büyükşehir Belediyespor (football team), a football club owned by the Municipality of Istanbul
- İstanbul Büyükşehir Belediyesi (volleyball team), a volleyball club owned by the Municipality of Istanbul
- İstanbul Büyükşehir Belediyesi S.K., a multi-sports club of the metropolitan municipality of Istanbul
- Istanbul Cavaliers, an American football team in Turkey founded in 2005
- İstanbul Güngörenspor, a football club founded in 1983
- Istanbul Maltepespor, a football club founded in 1923
- İstanbul Ottomans, the first ever Turkish rugby union team established in 1999
- Istanbul Paten Kulübü, an ice hockey sports club established 1987
- İstanbul Teknik Üniversitesi B.K., a basketball team of the Istanbul Technical University

== Transportation ==
- Canal Istanbul, an artificial waterway project
- İstanbul Haydarpaşa Terminal, terminus railway station at the Asian part of Istanbul
- Istanbul Hezarfen Airfield, an airport for general aviation located in the Çatalca district of Istanbul
- Istanbul LRT, a light metro system at the European part of Istanbul
- Istanbul Monorail, a cancelled monorail system in Istanbul
- Istanbul Metro, mass-transit underground railway network
- Istanbul Sirkeci Terminal, terminus railway station at the European part of Istanbul

== Religion ==
- Apostolic Vicariate of Istanbul, a Roman Catholic apostolic vicariate based in Istanbul, Turkey
- Armenian Catholic Archeparchy of Istanbul, also known as Armenian Catholic Archdiocese of Constantinople, serves Armenian Catholics in Turkey under the Armenian Catholic Patriarch of Cilicia

== Other uses ==
- Declaration of Istanbul, a declaration providing ethical guidelines for practice in organ donation and transplantation
- Istanbul Stock Exchange, a corporation in Turkey for securities exchange
- TCG Istanbul, ships of the Turkish Navy

== See also ==
- Byzantium (disambiguation)
- Constantinople (disambiguation)
- Istanbul Airport (disambiguation)
- Istanbul bombings (disambiguation)
- Istanbul Summit (disambiguation)
- Treaty of İstanbul (disambiguation)
