= Rome (disambiguation) =

Rome is the English name of the capital of Italy. The city, called Roma in Latin and Italian, was also the first capital of the Roman Empire and the seat of the papacy.

Rome may also refer to:

== Ancient history ==
- Ancient Rome, a civilization of classical antiquity, comprising:
  - The Roman Kingdom (753–509 BC), the regal period following the founding of Rome
  - The Roman Republic (509–27 BC), the era of expansion under republican government
  - The Roman Empire (27 BC–AD 395), the era of autocratic rule by emperors
  - The Western Roman Empire (AD 395–476), the western administrative half of the late Empire until its fall
  - The Eastern Roman Empire (AD 395-1453), the eastern administrative half and later sole surviving half of the late Empire

== Arts, entertainment, and media ==
=== Games ===
- Europa Universalis: Rome, a 2008 computer strategy game
- Rome: Pathway to Power, a 1992 computer adventure game
- Rome: Total War, a 2004 computer strategy game
- Total War: Rome II, a 2013 sequel to the computer strategy game Rome: Total War
- Imperator: Rome, a 2019 computer strategy game

=== Music ===
- Rome (band), Luxembourgish neofolk band
- Rome (R&B singer) (Jerome Woods, born 1970), American contemporary R&B singer
- Rome Ramirez (born 1988), American singer and guitarist
- Rome (Armand Hammer album)
- Rome (Danger Mouse and Daniele Luppi album), 2011 album by Danger Mouse and Daniele Luppi
- Rome (Rome album), Rome Wood's eponymous debut album
- Rome (Josh Pyke album), 2020
- Rome, a 2009 song by Phoenix from Wolfgang Amadeus Phoenix

=== Sports ===
- Rome Odunze (born 2002), American football player

=== Television ===
- Rome (TV series), 2005 historical drama television series

=== Other uses in arts, entertainment, and media ===
- Rome (novel), 1896 novel by Émile Zola
- Rome, Wisconsin, a fictional town in the TV show Picket Fences
- Rome Film Festival, an annual film festival

== People ==
- Rome (surname)
- Jerome "Rome" Fuentabella, a character from the Philippine drama series Ika-6 na Utos

== Places ==
=== United States ===
- Rome, Alabama
- Rome, Georgia
- Rome, Illinois
- Rome City, Indiana
- Rome, Indiana, an unincorporated community
- Rome, Iowa
- Rome, Ellis County, Kansas
- Rome, Sumner County, Kansas
- Rome, Kentucky
- Rome, Maine
- Rome Township, Michigan
- Rome, Mississippi
- Rome, Missouri
- Rome, New York
  - Rome Laboratory, formerly sited at Rome Air Force Base
- Rome, Ohio, a village
- Rome, Delaware County, Ohio, an unincorporated community
- Rome, Morrow County, Ohio, a ghost town
- Rome, Richland County, Ohio, an unincorporated community
- Rome, Oregon
- Rome, Pennsylvania, a borough surrounded by Rome Township, Pennsylvania
- Rome, Tennessee
- Rome, Adams County, Wisconsin, a town
  - Rome (community), Adams County, Wisconsin, an unincorporated community
- Rome, Jefferson County, Wisconsin, a census-designated place

=== Elsewhere ===
- Rome station (Paris Metro), a station on Paris Metro Line 2, France
- Metropolitan City of Rome Capital, Italy

== Religion ==
- Diocese of Rome, the papal archbishopric in central Italy
- Rome as pars pro toto for the Holy See and/or the whole (Roman) Catholic Church

== Law ==
- Rome I Regulation
- Rome II Regulation
- Rome III Regulation

== Other ==
- Romé, a wine of Spain
- Return on modeling effort (ROME), the benefit in improving a model
- Rome apple, an apple variety also known as Rome Beauty or Red Rome
- Rome process, an international effort to define and categorize the functional gastrointestinal disorders
- Epyc Rome, the second generation of AMD's Epyc line of server processors, codenamed Rome
- Répertoire opérationnel des métiers et des emplois, a listing of jobs in France

== See also ==
- Ancient Rome (disambiguation)
- New Rome (disambiguation)
- Rhome (disambiguation)
- Roam (disambiguation)
- Roma (disambiguation)
- Roman (disambiguation)
- Roman Empire (disambiguation)
- Roman Republic (disambiguation)
- Rome II (disambiguation)
- Rome Airport (disambiguation)
- Rome Township (disambiguation)
