= Rofe =

Rofe is a surname. Notable people with the surname include:

- Paul Rofe (disambiguation), several people

- Paul Rofe (barrister) (1948–2013), South Australian Director of Public Prosecutions
- Paul Rofe (cricketer) (born 1981), played for South Australia and Northamptonshire

- Dennis Rofe (born 1950), English footballer
- Esther Rofe (1904–2000), Australian musician and composer
- Ron Rofe (1914–2003), Australian politician
- Stan Rofe (1933–2003), Australian DJ and music news reporter
- Thomas E. Rofe (1869–1945), Australian ex-solicitor and Church of Christ supporter

== See also ==
- Rome (surname)
