= Rome, Ohio (disambiguation) =

Rome, Ohio is a village in Adams County.

Rome, Ohio may also refer to:

- Rome, Ashtabula County, Ohio, an unincorporated community
- Rome, Delaware County, Ohio, an unincorporated community
- Rome, Morrow County, Ohio, a ghost town
- Rome, Richland County, Ohio, an unincorporated community

== See also ==
- New Rome, Ohio
- Rome Township, Ohio (disambiguation)
