= Latin (disambiguation) =

Latin is an Italic language, originally spoken in ancient Rome and its empire.

Latin may also refer to:

== People ==
- Latins, peoples related to ancient Rome or its legacy across various historical periods
- Latins (Italic tribe), an ancient Italic tribe that inhabited central Italy from about 1000 to 300 BC
- Latins (Middle Ages), common name for followers of Western Christianity during the Middle Ages
- Latin Americans, the citizens of the Latin American countries and dependencies
- Latin Europeans, citizens of Latin Europe countries and dependencies
- Latino, a usually American term for Latin Americans in the United States

== People with the surname ==
- Denis Latin (born 1966), a Croatian television host
- Ivo Latin (1929–2002), speaker of the Parliament of Croatia and Mayor of Zagreb
- Jerry Latin (1953–2025), American football player

== Language ==
- Latin languages or Romance languages, modern languages that evolved from Vulgar Latin
- Latin alphabet, writing system used by the ancient Romans
- Latin script, writing system used for most contemporary European languages
- Old Latin, Latin language before 75 BC
- Classical Latin, literary Latin language of the late Roman Republic and early Roman Empire
- Late Latin, written Latin of late antiquity
- Vulgar Latin, non-standard Latin language variety spoken by the people of Ancient Rome
- Medieval Latin, Latin language of the Medieval era
- Renaissance Latin, Latin language of the Renaissance era
- Neo-Latin, revival of the Latin language between c. 1375 and c. 1900
- Contemporary Latin, the form of the Latin language used since the end of the 19th century
- Ecclesiastical Latin, the form of the Latin language used by the Catholic Church as a liturgical language

== Music ==
- Latin music, a popular music genre associated with and having roots in Ibero-America
- Latin (George Dalaras album), 1987
- Latin (Holy Fuck album), an album by the band Holy Fuck
- "Latin", the fourth movement of Mike Oldfield's Tubular Bells 2003 album

== Other uses ==
- Latin, Croatia, a village in Plaški, Croatia
- LATIN, a Latin American newspaper association
- Latin Church, the portion of the Catholic Church employing the Latin liturgical rites

== See also ==
- Latin Quarter (disambiguation)
- Latina (disambiguation)
- Latino (disambiguation)
- Latinization (disambiguation)
- Ladin (disambiguation)
- Lattin (disambiguation)
- Latin America, a group of countries and dependencies in the Western Hemisphere
- Latinus, a figure in Greek and Roman mythology associated with Odysseus and Aeneas
- Lateen or latin-rig, a type of sail rigging
