= Ladino =

Ladino, derived from Latin, may refer to:

- Judeo-Spanish language (ISO 639–3 lad), spoken by Sephardic Jews
- Ladino people, a socio-ethnic category of Mestizo or Hispanicized people in Central America especially in Guatemala
- Black Ladinos, a historical ethnic community in Medieval Spain
- Ladin language (ISO 639–3 lld), a Romance language spoken in Northern Italy, known in Italian as Ladino
- Ladino (surname)
- Ladino (rural locality), a rural locality (a village) in Novorzhevsky District of Pskov Oblast, Russia
- Ladino, a hardy type of large white clover, often grown as a forage crop
- Ladino poem, a 19th-century Philippine poetry style

== See also ==
- Ladina, a village in Croatia
- Latino (disambiguation)
