= Nova Roma =

Nova Roma (or "New Rome") may refer to:

- Nova Roma (organization), an international organization of Roman cultural revival and global network of Roman reenactment
- Constantinople, originally founded as Constantinopolis Nova Roma in 324
- Nova Roma, Goiás, a town in Brazil
- Nova Roma do Sul, another town in the State of Rio Grande do Sul, in Brazil
- Nova Roma, a fictional secluded colony in Marvel Comics, home of Magma

== See also ==
- Constantinople (disambiguation)
- Roma (disambiguation)
- Rome (disambiguation)
- New Rome (disambiguation)
- Second Rome
- Third Rome
- Rome II (disambiguation)
