= Battle for Rome =

Battle for Rome may refer to:

- The title under which the series Ancient Rome: The Rise and Fall of an Empire was transmitted on the Discovery Channel
- One of the alternative names for what is now more commonly referred to as the Battle of Monte Cassino

== See also ==
- Capture of Rome (1870) by the Kingdom of Sardinia
- Battle of Rome (disambiguation)
- Siege of Rome (disambiguation)
- Sack of Rome (disambiguation)
- Fall of Rome (disambiguation)
- Battle (disambiguation)
- Rome (disambiguation)
