= Michael Wigler =

American molecular biologist (born 1947)

- Born: Michael Howard Wigler; September 3, 1947 (age 78); New York
- Education: Princeton University; Columbia University (Ph.D.)
- Spouse: Edith
- Children: Benjamin and Joshua
- Scientific career
- Workplaces: Columbia University; Cold Spring Harbor Laboratory

Michael Howard Wigler (born September 3, 1947, in New York) is an American molecular biologist who has directed a laboratory at Cold Spring Harbor Laboratory since 1978 and is a member of the National Academy of Sciences. He is best known for developing methods to genetically engineer animal cells and his contributions to cancer, genomics and autism genetics.

== Education ==
Wigler graduated from Princeton University in 1970, majoring in mathematics, and in 1978 received his PhD from Columbia University in microbiology, and has spent the remainder of his career at Cold Spring Harbor Laboratory (CSHL).

== Career ==
Beginning in the late 1970s, at Columbia University, Wigler, Richard Axel and Saul Silverstein developed methods for engineering animal cells. These methods are the basis for many discoveries in mammalian genetics, and the means for producing protein therapeutics such as those used to treat heart disease, cancer and strokes.

After moving to CSHL, Wigler continued his studies of gene transfer into mammalian cells, exploring the integration of foreign DNA and its stability of expression in host cells, demonstrating the inheritance of DNA methylation patterns, and isolating the first vertebrate genes, and first human oncogenes, using DNA transfer and genetic selection. His laboratory was among the group that first showed the involvement of members of the RAS gene family in human cancer, and that point mutations can activate the oncogenic potential of cellular genes.

Wigler's laboratory was the first to demonstrate that some regulatory pathways have been so conserved in evolution that yeast can be used as a host to study the function of mammalian genes and in particular genes involved in signal transduction pathways and cancer. This led to deep insights into RAS function, eventually solving the RAS biochemical pathway in yeast and humans, and demonstrating the multifunctional nature of this important oncogene. From this work in fungi new cellular mechanisms were recognized for "insulating" signal transduction pathways with protein scaffolds that reduce cross-talk and for processing and localization of proteins.

During this period Wigler's lab published the first use of epitope tagging for protein purification. Following the success with epitope tagging, Wigler and collaborator Joe Sorge patented methods for the creating libraries of genes encoding diverse families of antibody molecules. The concept of antibody libraries is most often combined with the method of phage display used in development of antibody-based therapeutics.

In the early 1990s, Wigler and collaborator W. Clark Still at Columbia University developed the first method for encoding combinatorial chemical synthesis, a method for using gas chromatography tags to record reaction "history" while building vast libraries of chemical compounds. This approach is still used today for drug discovery.

In this same period, Wigler and Nikolai Lisitsyn developed the concept and applications of representational difference analysis, which led to their identification of new cancer genes, including the tumor suppressor PTEN, and by others the cancer virus-causing Kaposi's sarcoma, KSHV. In the late '90s, Drs. Wigler and Robert Lucito combined genome representations with array hybridization leading to a technique called ROMA used to show common structural variation in genomes.

In the decade since 2004, Wigler and Jim Hicks at CSHL, together with Anders Zetterberg of the Karolinska Institute, applied methods of copy number analysis for prognostication of breast cancer. The need for accurate measurement of nucleic acid molecules led to the development of varietal tags, more commonly known as unique molecular identifiers. This work led to the first successful sequence-based analysis of the genomes of single cancer cells from tumors by Wigler's then-graduate student Nick Navin, and subsequently, tumor cells in circulation by Wigler's collaborator Jim Hicks.

In the early 2000s, Wigler, Jonathan Sebat and Lakshmi Muthuswamy began copy number analysis of healthy individuals, leading to the discovery of a new source of genetic variability, copy number variations or CNVs. The abundance of CNVs in the human genome is a major source of individual variation. The team at CSHL then continued this line of work to demonstrate that spontaneous germ-line mutation is likely to be a major cause for autism. Their observations and theories about autism provide a now widely accepted approach for understanding other human mental and physical abnormalities.

== Awards ==
- National Academy of Sciences, Member
- AACR G.H.A. Clowes Award
- Stevens Triennial Prize from Columbia University
- American Academy of Arts and Sciences, Member
