= Treaty of Constantinople =

Treaty of Constantinople or Treaty of Istanbul may refer to the following treaties signed in Constantinople (modern Istanbul, Turkey):

- Rus'–Byzantine Treaty (907), signed in Constantinople, ended the Rus'–Byzantine War (907)
- Rus'–Byzantine Treaty (911), signed in Constantinople
- Rus'–Byzantine Treaty (945), signed in Constantinople, ended the Rus'–Byzantine War (941)
- Byzantine–Venetian Treaty of 1082, signed in Constantinople, as a trade and defense pact
- Nicaean–Venetian Treaty of 1219, signed in Constantinople, as a trade and defense pact
- Treaty of Constantinople (1454), between the Ottoman Empire and the Republic of Venice
- Treaty of Constantinople (1479), between the Ottoman Empire and the Republic of Venice, ended the Ottoman–Venetian War (1463–1479)
- Treaty of Constantinople (1533), between the Ottoman Empire and the Archduchy of Austria, as a result of the Battle of Mohacs
- Treaty of Constantinople (1562), between the Ottoman Empire and the Holy Roman Empire
- Treaty of Constantinople (1570), between the Ottoman Empire and the Tsardom of Russia
- Treaty of Constantinople (1590), between the Ottoman Empire and Safavid Persia, ended the Ottoman–Safavid War (1578–1590)
- Treaty of Constantinople (1700), between the Ottoman Empire and Russia, ended the Russo-Turkish War (1686–1700)
- Treaty of Constantinople (1724), between the Ottoman Empire and Russia, dividing large parts of Persia amongst themselves
- Treaty of Constantinople (1736), between the Ottoman Empire and Afsharid Persia, ending the Afsharid-Ottoman War (1730–1735)
- Treaty of Constantinople (1782), between the Ottoman Empire and Spain
- Treaty of Constantinople (1800), approval of the 1st Constitution of the Septinsular Republic (as a tributary state to the Ottoman Empire) by the Ottoman Sultan
- Treaty of Constantinople (1832), between the Ottoman Empire and the Great Powers (Britain, France and Russia)
- Treaty of Constantinople (1881), between the Ottoman Empire and the Kingdom of Greece
- Convention of Constantinople, treaty signed in 1888, relating to the control of the Suez Canal
- Treaty of Constantinople (1897), between the Ottoman Empire and the Kingdom of Greece, ending the Greco-Turkish War (1897)
- Treaty of Constantinople (1913), between the Ottoman Empire and Bulgaria, after the Second Balkan War
- Treaty of Constantinople (1914), between the Ottoman Empire and Serbia

== See also ==
- List of treaties
  - List of Byzantine treaties
  - List of treaties of the Ottoman Empire
  - List of treaties of Turkey
- Constantinople Agreement, a WWI agreement to apportion Constantinople and the Dardanelles to Russia
- Istanbul Convention on Temporary Entry, 1990 (WTO goods trade)
- Istanbul Protocol, 1999 (torture)
- Istanbul Convention, 2011, on violence against women and domestic violence
- Treaty (disambiguation)
- Istanbul (disambiguation)
- Constantinople (disambiguation)
