= Romas =

Romas may refer to:

== Geography ==
- Romãs, Decermilo e Vila Longa, a freguesia (civil parish) of Sátão, Portugal

== People ==
- the Romani people

=== Given name ===
- Romas Dalinkevičius (1950-2001), Lithuanian painter.
- Romas Dressler (born 1987), German footballer
- Romas Kalanta (1953–1972), Lithuanian high school student and protester
- Romas Kirveliavičius (born 1988), Lithuanian-Austrian handball player
- Romas Kukalis, Canadian painter
- Romas Lileikis, Lithuanian poet, musician, and film director
- Romas Mažeikis (born 1964), Lithuanian footballer
- Romas Petrukanecas (born 1973), Lithuanian sprint canoer
- Romas Zabarauskas (born 1990), Lithuanian film director, screenwriter and producer
- Romas Ubartas (born 1960), Lithuanian discus thrower

=== Surname ===
- Jacques de Romas (1713-1776), French physicist
- Haris Romas (born 1960), Greek actor, screenwriter, and lyricist

== Other ==
- Tony Roma's, international restaurant chain

== See also ==
- Roma (disambiguation)
