= Fall of Rome (disambiguation) =

Fall of Rome may refer to:

== History ==
- Sack of Rome (disambiguation), where the city of Rome is defeated
- Capture of Rome (1870) by the Kingdom of Italy
- Battle of Monte Cassino (1944) which included the Fall of Rome; during World War II
- Fall of the Western Roman Empire (476/480)
- Fall of Constantinople (1453), Ottoman capture of the Byzantine capital, effectively ending the Eastern Roman Empire

== Music ==
- Fall of Rome (song), 1987 James Reyne song
- The Fall of Rome (song), 2010 debut song of The Bottletop Band
- The Fall of Rome (tune), 1964 instrumental from the soundtrack for the film The Fall of the Roman Empire (film)
- Fall of Rome (tune), 2012 instrumental from the video game Civilization V: Gods and Kings, see Music in the Civilization video game series

== Film and television ==
- The Fall of Rome (film), (Italian: Il crollo di Roma) 1963 Italian film
- The Fall of Rome (2006 TV episode) episode 6 of Ancient Rome: The Rise and Fall of an Empire

== Literature ==
- The Fall of Rome (1850 novel), novel by Wilkie Collins, see Antonina (Collins novel)
- The Fall of Rome: A Novel (2002 novel), novel by Martha Southgate, winner of the 2003 Alex Awards
- The Fall of Rome: A Novel of a World Lost (2007 novel), a novel by Michael Curtis Ford
- Stargate SG-1: Fall of Rome (comic book arc) 2004 multi-issue arc, see List of Stargate comics

== Other uses ==
- Fall of Rome (play-by-mail game), a play-by-mail game published by Enlightened Age Entertainment
- The Fall of Rome (wargame), 1973 solitaire board wargame
- Pandemic: Fall of Rome (board game) 2018 game from the boardgame series Pandemic (board game)

== See also ==
- Operation Achse, and the Nazi takeover of the Italian government after the collapse of the government in Rome
- Late antiquity, the era of the Fall of Rome (Western Roman Empire)
- Historiography of the fall of the Western Roman Empire
- The Fall of the Roman Empire (film), 1964 U.S. film
- Decline and fall of the Roman Empire (disambiguation)
- Battle for Rome (disambiguation)
- Battle of Rome (disambiguation)
- Siege of Rome (disambiguation)
- Rome (disambiguation)
- Fall (disambiguation)
