= Last Emperor =

Last Emperor may refer to:

- Last Roman Emperor, figure in medieval eschatology
- Payitaht: Abdülhamid, English: The Last Emperor, a Turkish historical television drama series
- Puyi (1906–1967), the last emperor of China
- The Last Emperor, 1987 film about the life of Puyi
  - The Last Emperor (album), soundtrack album for the 1987 film
- The Last Emperor (rapper) (born 1972), recording name of American hip-hop artist Jamal Gray
- Valentino: The Last Emperor, 2009 documentary film about the life of Italian fashion designer Valentino Garavani
- Fedor Emelianenko, a former Russian mixed martial artist.

== See also ==
- Last Roman Emperor (disambiguation)
