= Ancient Rome (disambiguation) =

Ancient Rome was the city, state, and civilisation of Rome during antiquity.

Ancient Rome may also refer to:

- Ancient Rome (painting), a painting by Giovanni Paolo Panini
- Ancient Rome: The Rise and Fall of an Empire, a 2006 BBC One docudrama series

Ancient Roman can refer to:

- Ancient Roman: Power of Dark Side, a 1998 PlayStation role-playing game

== See also ==
- Agriculture in ancient Rome
- Ancient Roman architecture
- History of Rome
- History of the Roman Empire
- Roman Empire (disambiguation)
- Roman imperial period (chronology)
- Roman Iron Age
- Roman Republic (disambiguation)
- Rome (disambiguation)
