= Wood splitter (occupation) =

Occupation related to woodworking

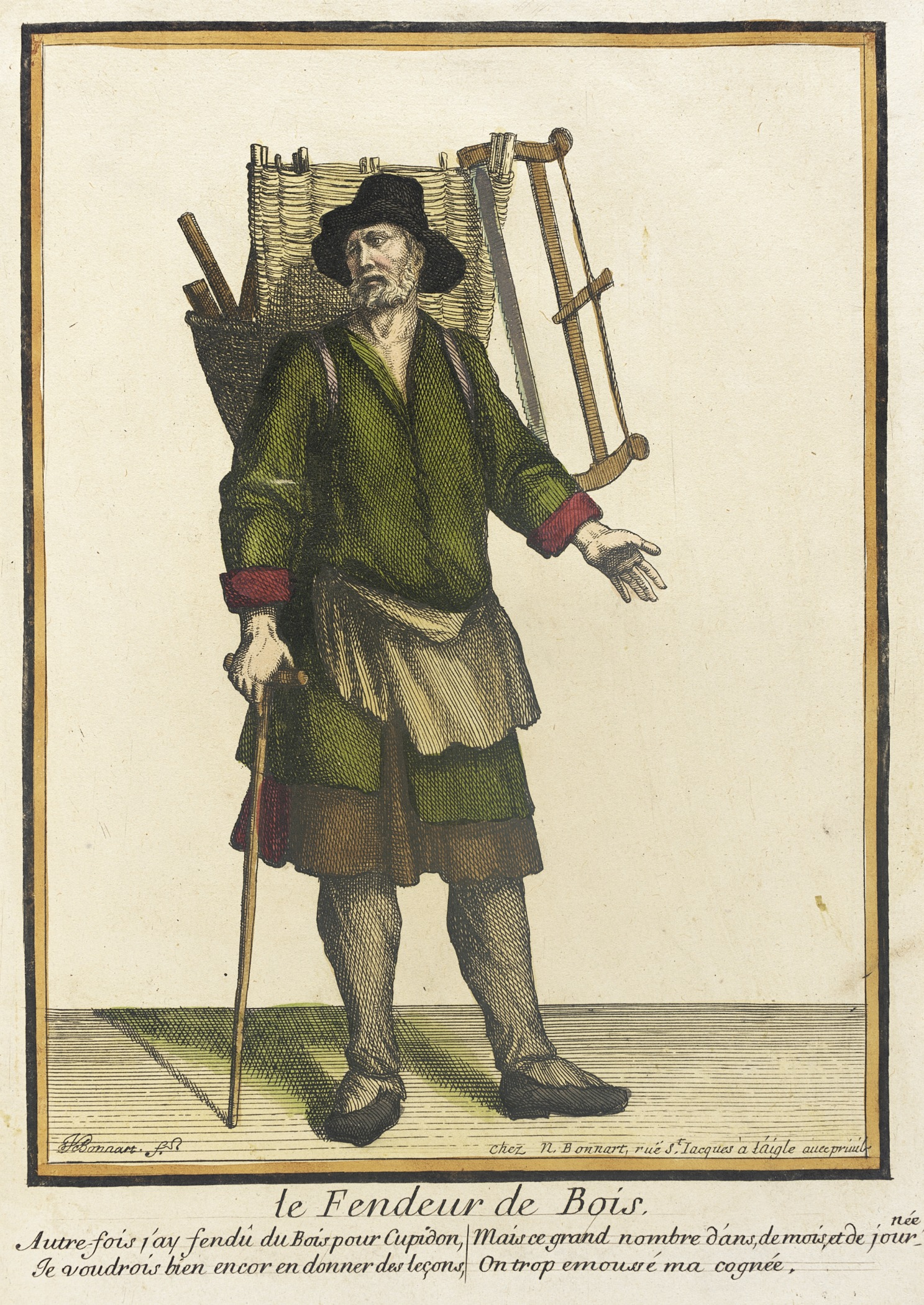
- Collection of French court fashions: Le Fendeur de Bois (17th century)

Occupation
- Synonyms: Merrandier, Fendeur/Fendeuse de merrains.
- Activity sectors: Woodworking

Description
- Competencies: Good knowledge of wood, manual dexterity, endurance
- Education required: CAP/BEP in woodworking industries, apprenticeship
- Related jobs: Joiner, lumberjack, cooper.

A wood splitter, formerly known as a “merrandier”, and nowadays as a “fendeur de merrains” or “merrains splitter”, is a woodworking professional whose activity consists of splitting - not sawing - segments of hardwood trunks (mainly oak), called logs, lengthwise, and working them into staves for cooperage. It's an age-old craft that has kept pace with the evolution of techniques over the ages, and in 21st-century France it represents a skilled job in a very active economic sector.

== From its origins to the early 20th century ==
=== Definition ===
Under the Ancien Régime, Pierre Richelet's Dictionnaire de la langue française, ancienne et moderne defined a wood splitter as “a man who makes his living splitting wood. To split wood, the splitter uses only a mallet, iron wedges & an axe”.

According to Marcel Lachiver's Dictionnaire du monde rural (1997), a splitter is “a worker who splits wood, slates, oak or chestnut logs to make stavewood that cannot be sawn”.

=== History ===
It's likely that barrel-making - and therefore the staves needed to make them - goes back a very long way, with many traces of their existence in Roman Gaul as early as the 1st century AD.

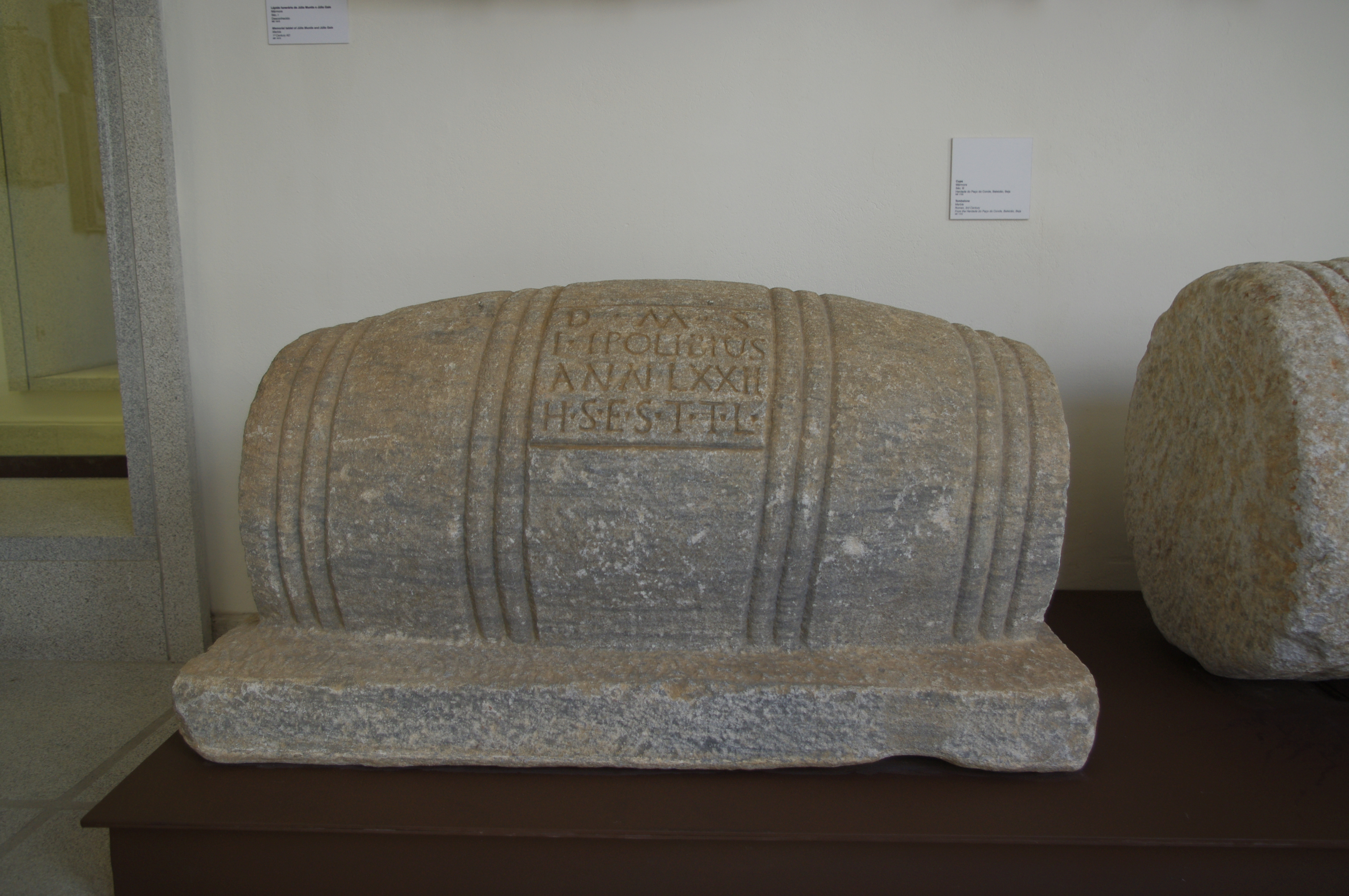
Roman tombstone carved in the shape of a barrel, used for the burial of a winemaker, 3rd century A.D., Alentejo region, Portugal.

Nevertheless, it is difficult to find written evidence of the existence of the stave wood splitting trade before the 17th century: a contract signed in 1665 in Valençay, Berry (France), between the timber merchant Moreau and a forge mistress stipulates that the latter may only use the wood from a cut after “the said Moreau has drawn the wood suitable for sawing, spreading and splitting”.

Another testimony, half a century later, to this trade transmitted through an expensive apprenticeship, lasting up to five years and using valuable tools: In Angoumois, on June 30, 1719, Jean Breton, a “splitter boy”, signed a notarized deed transferring all his movable and immovable rights to his brother Marc, a master splitter, (Note: The terms “splitter boy” and “master splitter” indicate the existence of an already well-established and officially organized corporation.) “to remain free towards the said Marc, his brother, of what he could owe him for having shown and taught him the splitter's trade [...], in exchange for the fact that the said Marc has today delivered to his brother all the tools he used for his trade as a splitter”.

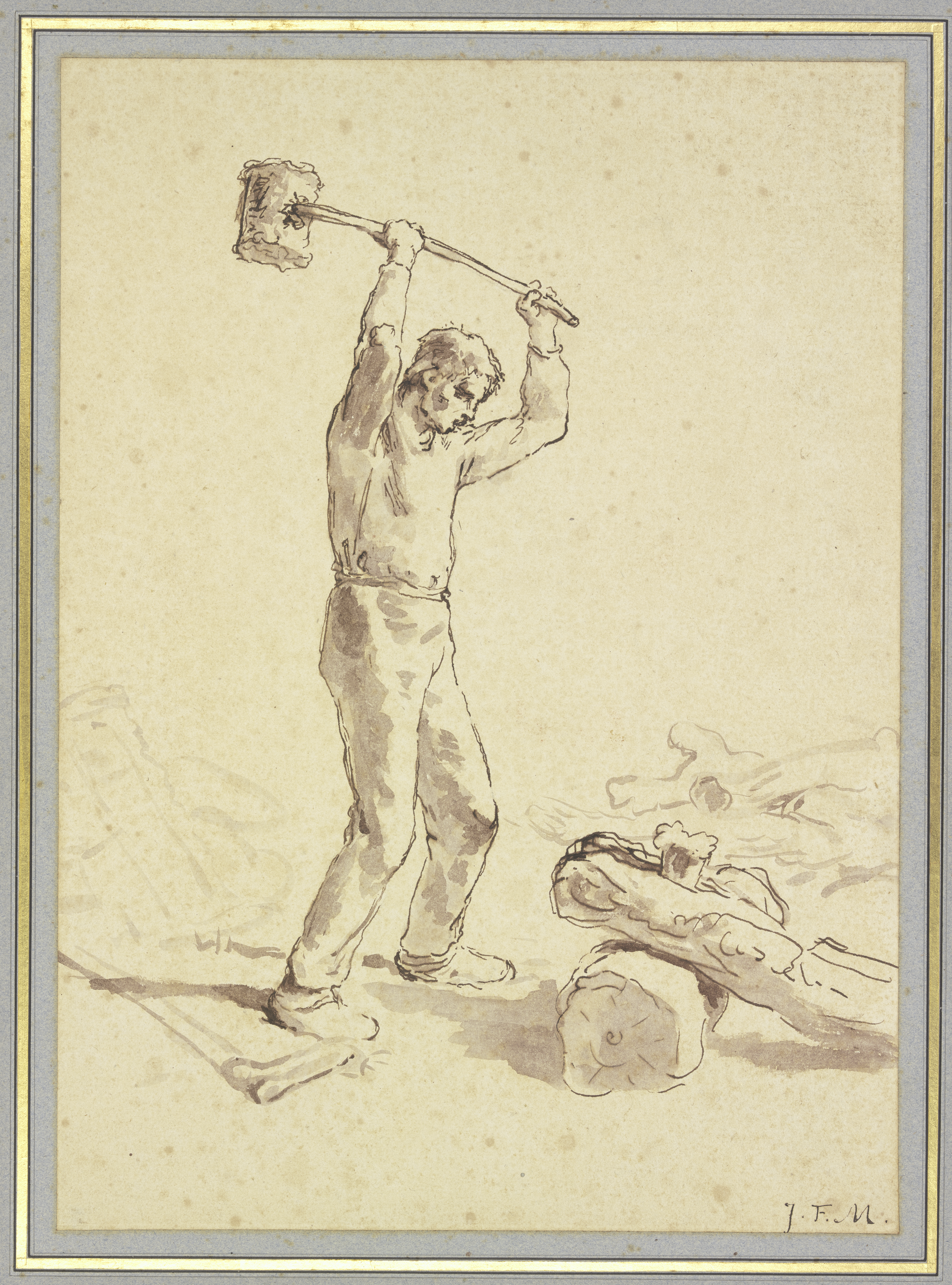
Jean-François Millet (1814-1875), Le fendeur de bois.

In the 19th century, Freemasonry was integrated into the splitters' guild, as evidenced by this “cantique coignard”, (Note: Coignard is an old, common nickname for a lumberjack: he's the “cogneur” or axe-wielder.) a Masonic chant not devoid of double meanings, taken from the Rituel de la Maçonnerie forestière, collected in 1881:

My dear friends, brave splitters,
That the axe gathers,
Are there pleasures more flattering
Than to split well together?
Let us love and drink,
Let's sing and split,
That's our supreme law;
In these dark places,
To who cleaves best,
We give the diadem.
According to the wood, a good splitter
Mends his skill.
Some want stiffness.
Others want suppleness.
Always, straight and true,
Put down your tool,
If you want to split ;
The corner well tempered,
Well set, well struck,
The wood must surrender. [...]
Oak often resists;
So much the better for victory.
Splitters, like lovers,
Are friends of glory.
Let the tool, first,
Caress the edge
Of the rough bark;
The wedge strengthens,
The wood softens
And the splitter breaches. [...]

— Dug up in the Forêt Ducale d'Elbeuf in the Saint-Nicolas sale, at the Pied du Hêtre

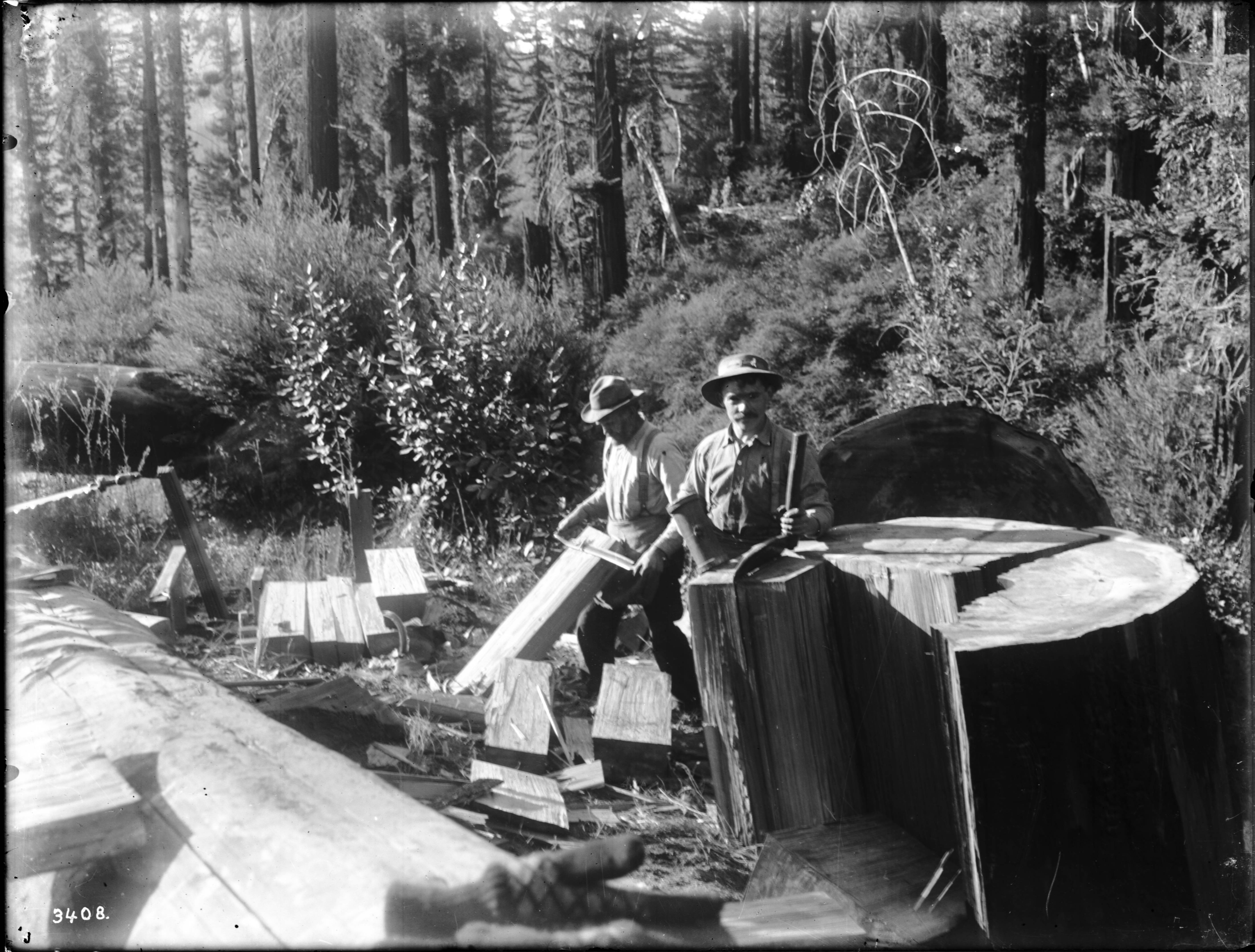
California, circa 1900: two splitters work with a splitter and plane cedar wood to make shingles, under conditions similar to those described for France.

Until the early 20th century, the trade was essentially carried out in the forest itself, where splitters felled oak trees and cut their trunks into segments to make staves. They then live continuously on the “worksite”, after having built their lodge, a temporary hut made of branches and ferns where they shelter their food and tools, and where they sleep on a bed of straw and grass. Splitters work with two men from the same family, usually a father and son or two brothers.

During the splitting season (excluding winter and harvest time), workdays can last up to eighteen hours, starting before daylight with the sawing of a trunk into sections, the start of which is located by feel (notches having been made the day before), and lasting until nightfall, finishing the shaping of the staves in front of the lodge, by the light of a wood fire. In return for this hard existence and highly skilled work, the splitters were well paid, better than peasants, and were able to build up some financial property for their old age.

=== Description ===
The activity of the splitter should not be confused with that of the sawyer: the aim is not to obtain planks by sawing the length of an oak log (a section of trunk), but to split it into two halves by separating the fibers without cutting them, using wedges and a splitting maul, and to divide these halves into quarters using a large cleaver and a heavy wooden mallet. These quarters are then trimmed, mainly with a plane, to obtain the stave; this, due to the technique used, will be waterproof, unlike a plank. For 3 cubic meters of log, approximately 1 cubic meter of stavewood is obtained.

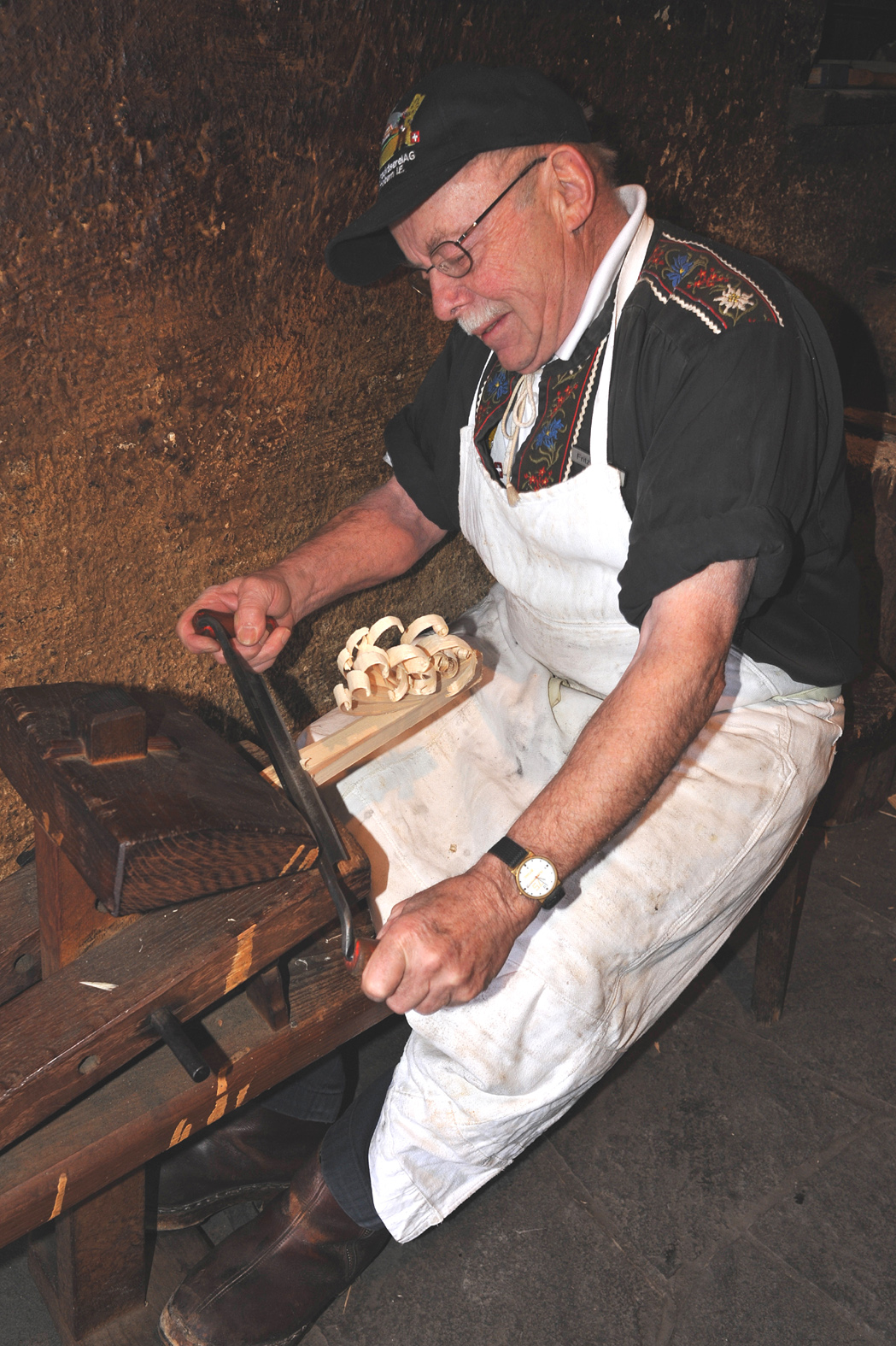
Example of the use of a plane.

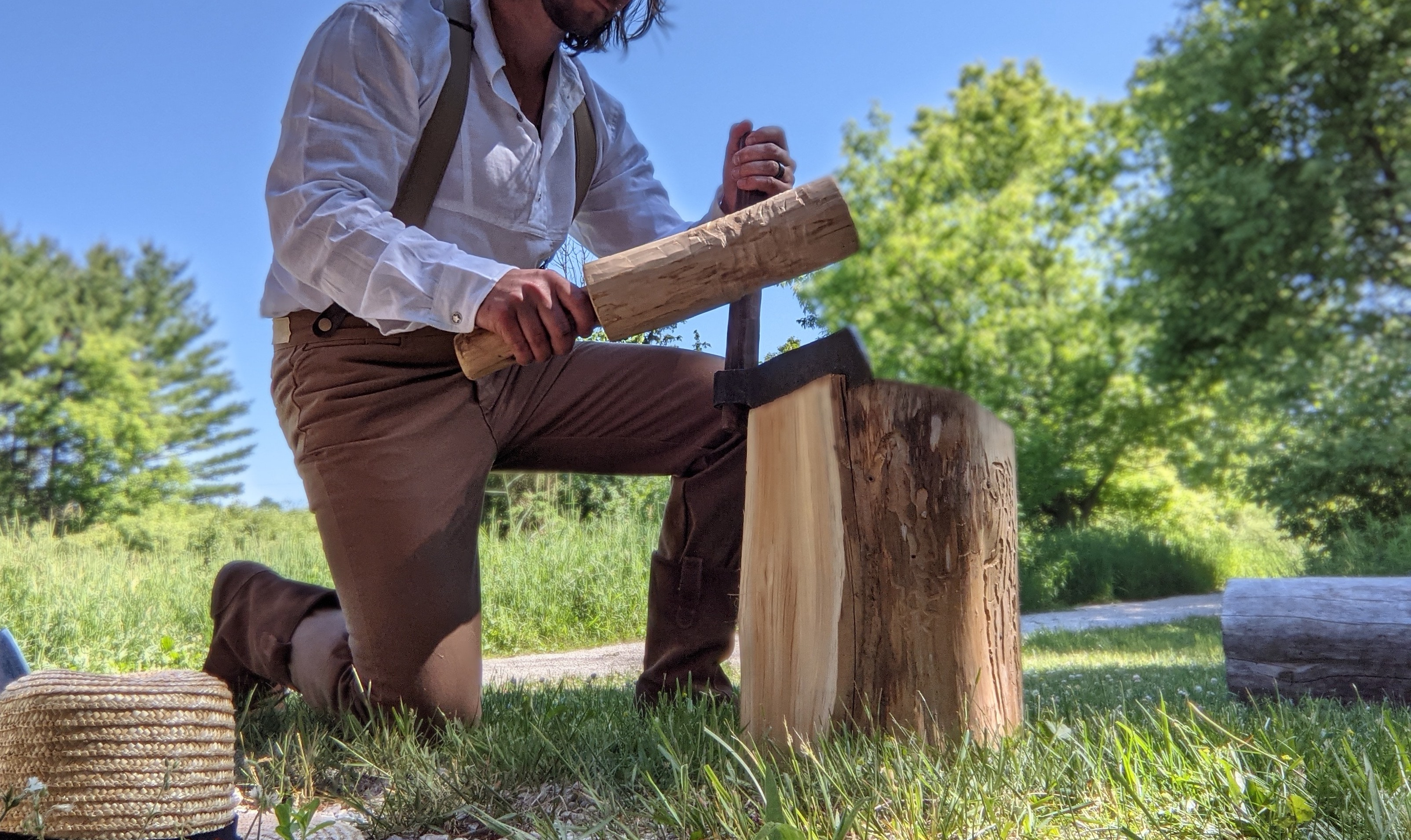
A small wood splitter in action (here, making shingles).

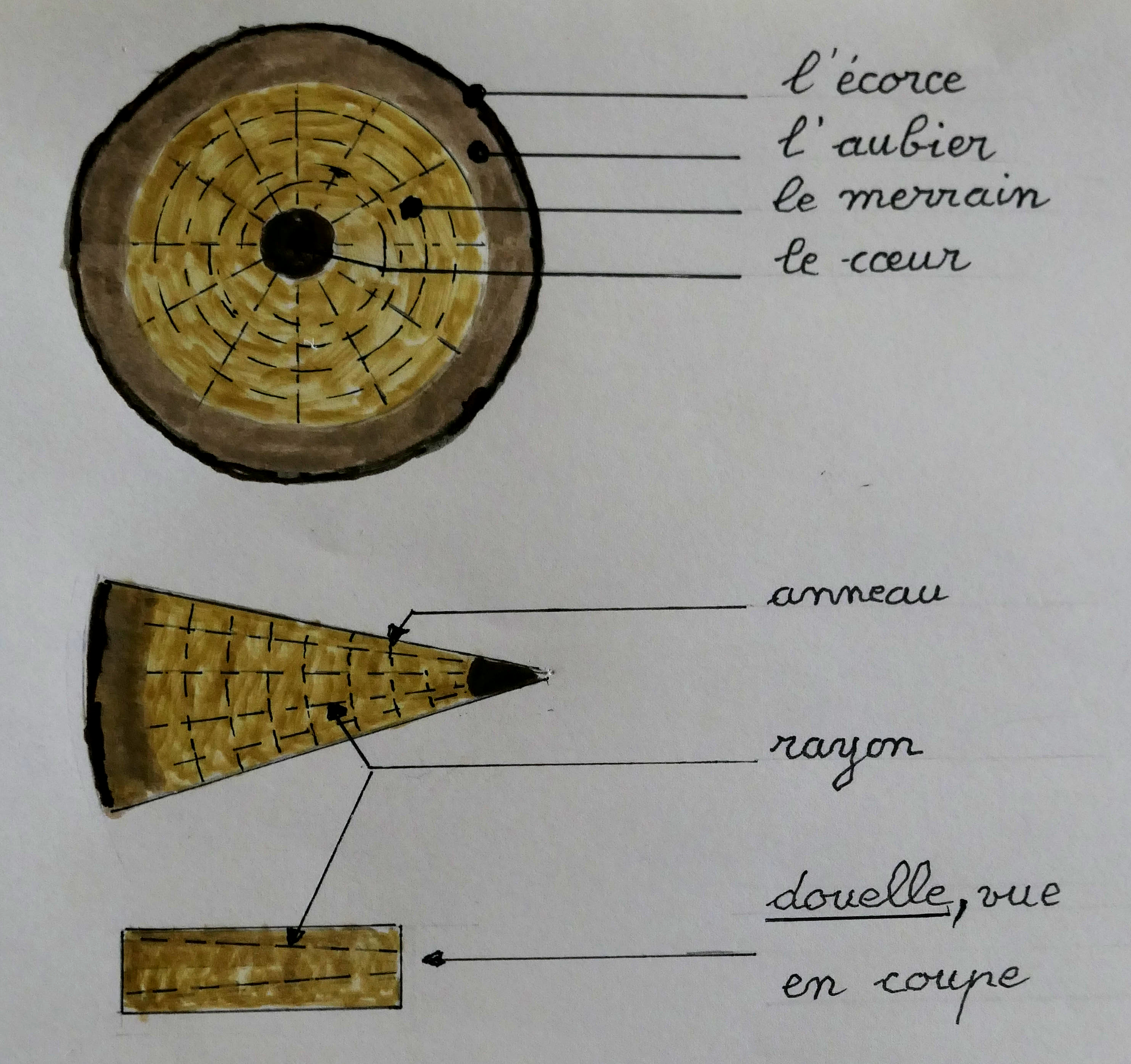
Cutting a trunk, a quarter and a stave: rays (permeable) and growth rings (impermeable).

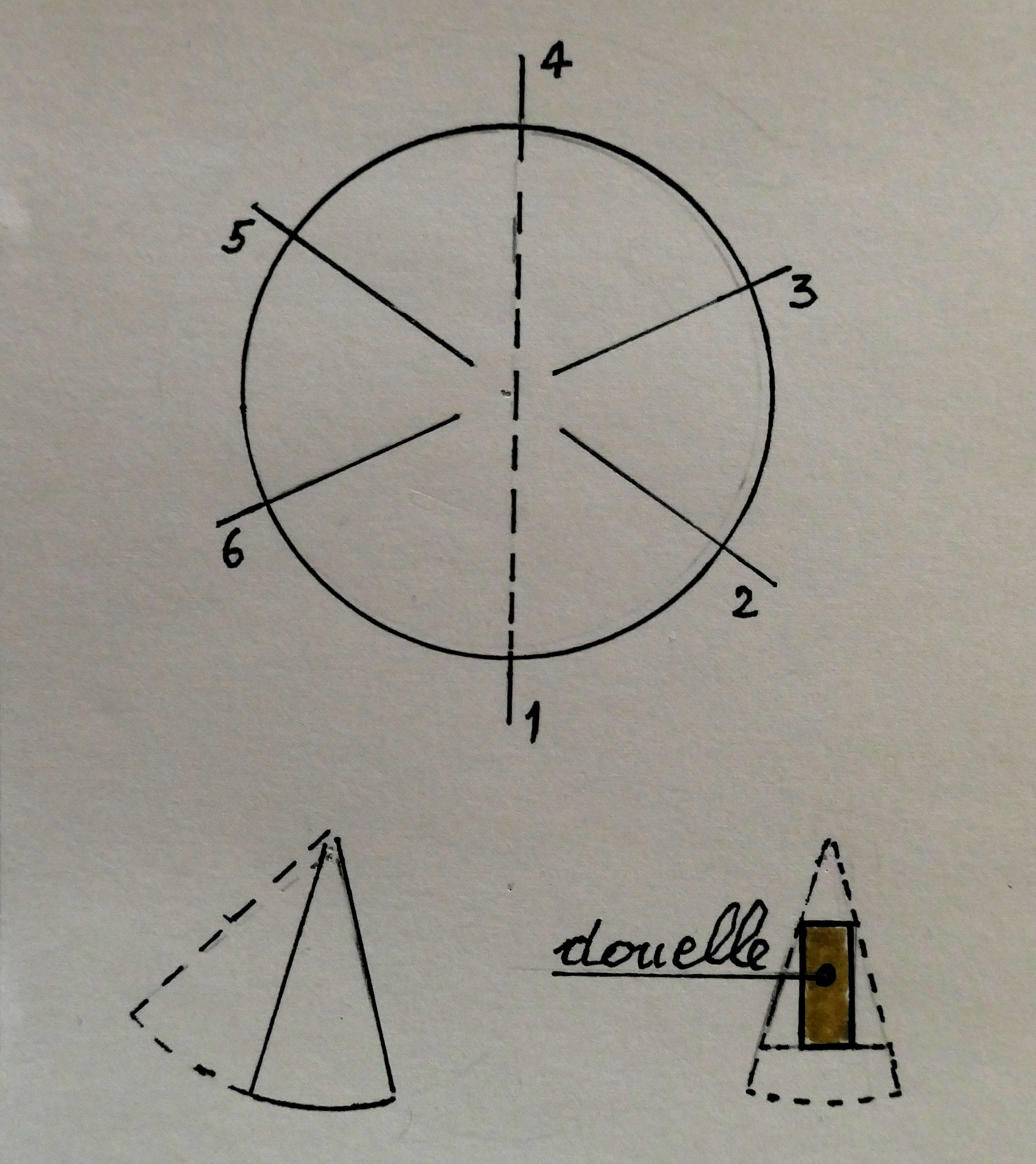
Splitting and cutting lines to produce a watertight stave.

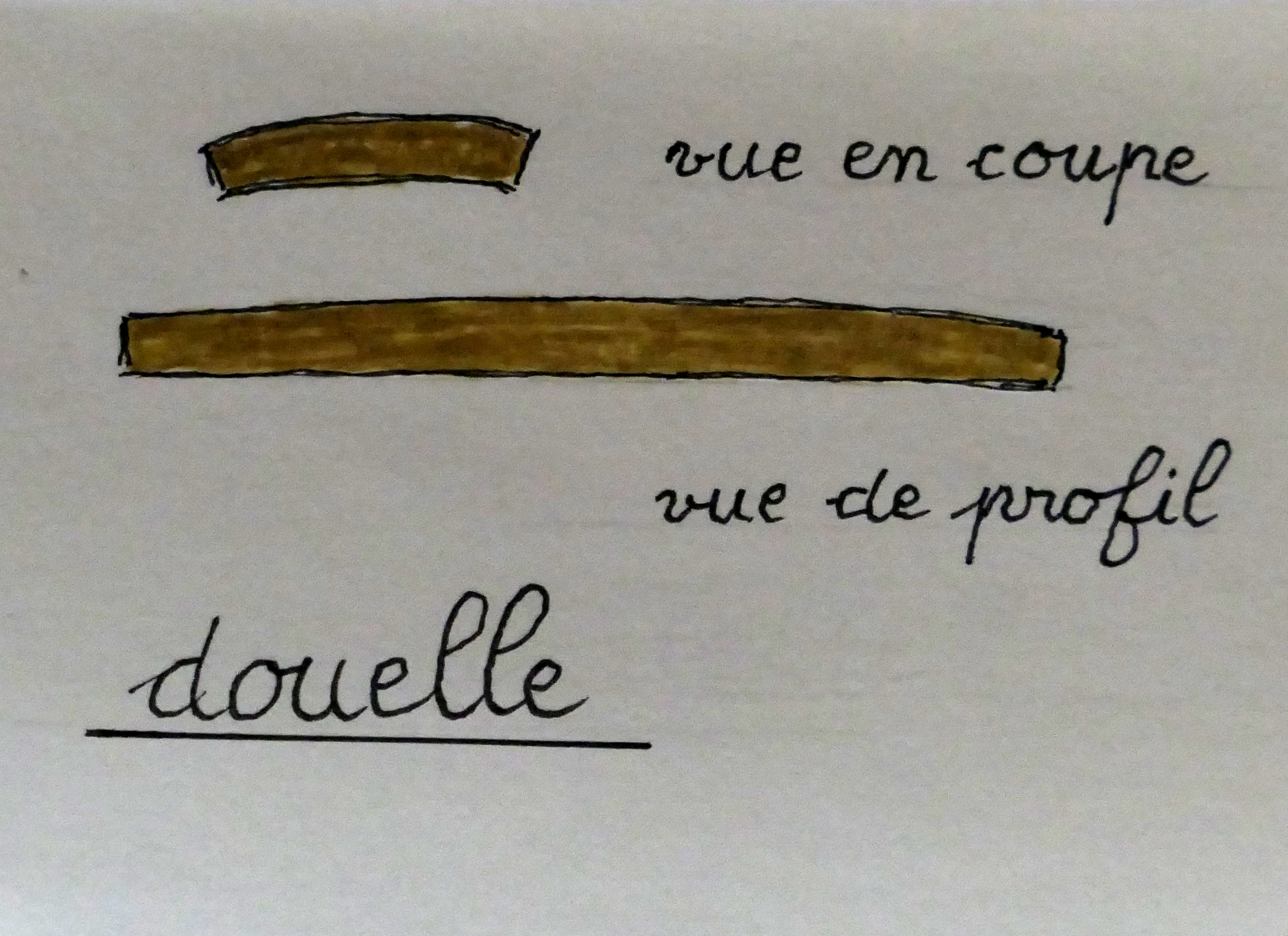
Finished barrel stave: cross-section and profile (outer surface is slightly convex in both directions).

== 20th and 21st centuries ==
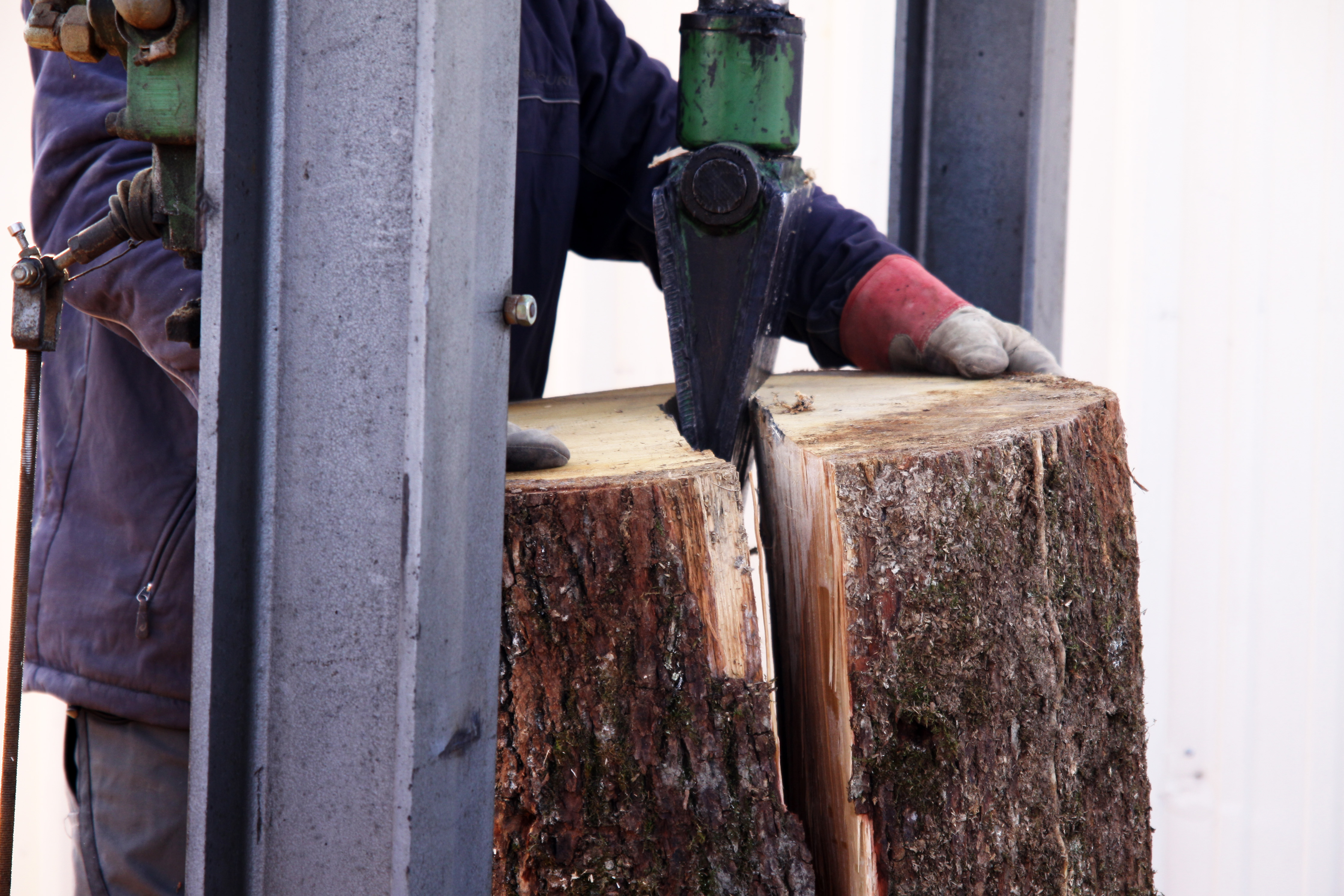
Log segment split with the wedge of a hydraulic splitter.

The demand for quality staves, indispensable for making oak barrels for winemaking and the production of cognacs, has not waned and remains high in France; thus, the trade continues to have its place in the timber industry, while keeping pace with advances in techniques and tools, as well as changes in regulations concerning working conditions: in the 21st century, staves are made in a company called a “merranderie”, using machines such as the hydraulic splitter, but the skill of the splitter is still required. The profession is officially listed as “stave splitter”, and is the subject of a ROME file in the “Primary lumber processing” category under code H2205, where under Specific skills we find: “Splitting a stave log”. A job description detailing the entire “Splitter / Fendeuse de merrain” activity, originally published by the Agence nationale pour l'emploi (ANPE), is also available in 2023 on temporary employment sites.

== See also ==
- Lumberjack
- Wood splitting
- Cooper (profession)
- Wood shingle
