= Let's Get This Party Started =

Let's Get This Party Started may refer to:

== Television ==
- A 2008 episode of the show The L Word
- A 2007 episode of the show The Salt-N-Pepa Show
- "Let's get this party started!", catchphrase from Coyote Ragtime Show

== Music ==
- "Let's Get This Party Started", a song by 2face Idibia, Wizkid, D'banj, Tiwa Savage and M.I
- "Let's Get This Party Started", a song by Azuré & Snoop Dogg from Snoop Dogg Presents The Big Squeeze
- "Let's Get This Party Started", a song by Dee Dee Sharp
- "Let's Get This Party Started", a song by Funk Machine from Renaissance: The Mix Collection
- "Let's Get This Party Started", a song by Korn from Issues
- "Let's Get This Party Started", a song by Macy Gray performed at the Live Earth concert, Rio de Janeiro
- "Let's Get This Party Started", a song by Robbie Rivera
- "Let's Get This Party Started", a song by Roma!
- "Let's Get This Party Started", a song by Take 5 from the film Longshot
- "Let's Get This Party Started", a song by Zena McNally
