= Lattin =

== People ==
- Dave Lattin (born 1943), American basketball player
- Don Lattin, American journalist and author
- Susannah Lattin (1848–1868), American woman whose death led to regulation of maternity clinics in New York City
- Vernon Lattin (born 1938), American president of Brooklyn College

== Places ==
- Lattin, County Tipperary, Ireland, a village
- Lattin, West Virginia, United States, an unincorporated community
- Lattingtown, a village on Long Island, New York

== See also ==
- Latin, a language
- Latin (disambiguation)
