= New Rome (disambiguation) =

New Rome is another name for Constantinople.

New Rome may also refer to:

== Places ==
=== United States ===
- New Rome, Minnesota
- New Rome, Ohio
- New Rome, Wisconsin

=== Other ===
- Paris, designated nouvelle Rome at various stages of history between the reigns of Philip IV and Louis XIV
- Italian Empire, as an empire
- New Rome, the city that serves as the setting of the 2024 film Megalopolis

== See also ==
- Rome (disambiguation)
- New Roman Empire (disambiguation)
- Byzantium
- Constantinople (disambiguation)
- Nova Roma (disambiguation)
- Rome II (disambiguation)
- Second Rome (disambiguation)
- Third Rome
- Times New Roman
- Pax Americana
- Translatio imperii
