= Rome II =

Rome II may refer to:

- Rome II Regulation, governing choice of law in the European Union in disputes about non-contractual obligations
- Rome II, part of the Rome process about the diagnosis and treatment of functional gastrointestinal disorders
- Total War: Rome II, a 2013 strategy video game

== See also ==
- Nova Roma (disambiguation)
- Second Rome (disambiguation)
- New Rome (disambiguation)
- Rome (disambiguation)
- Second Vatican Council
- University of Rome Tor Vergata, also known as the University of Rome II
- Season 2 of Rome (TV series)
