= Battle of Rome =

Battle of Rome may refer to:

- Battle of Rome, a 537 battle during the Siege of Rome
- Muslim raid on Rome (846)
- Capture of Rome, an 1870 battle with the Kingdom of Sardinia
- German occupation of Rome, a battle in September 1943 between German and Italian forces after the Italian Armistice of Cassibile with the Allies.
- Liberation of Rome or the Battle of Rome, a 1944 battle during WWII
  - Battle of Monte Cassino or Battle of Rome

== See also ==
- Battle for Rome (disambiguation)
- Battle of Rome Cross Roads, an 1864 battle of the American Civil War in Gordon County, Georgia
- Fall of Rome (disambiguation)
- List of Roman battles
- List of Roman civil wars and revolts
- Sack of Rome (disambiguation)
- Siege of Rome (disambiguation)
