= Constantinople (disambiguation) =

Constantinople is the historic city name of present-day Istanbul in Turkey, formerly known as Byzantium. Constantinople or Constantinopolis may also refer to:

- Constantinople (ensemble), a Canadian early music group
- Aziyadé, or Constantinople, a 1879 novel by Pierre Loti
- Constantinople (De Amicis book), an 1877 travel book by Edmondo de Amicis
- Constantinople: City of the World's Desire, 1453–1924, a 1995 book by Phillip Mansel
- "Istanbul (Not Constantinople)", a 1953 novelty song
- "Constantinople", a song by the Decemberists from the 2005 EP Picaresqueties
- "Constantinople", a song by the Residents from the 1978 album Duck Stab/Buster & Glen
- Dufrais Constantinople, a fictional character in the TV show Fonejacker and Facejacker
- Jules Constantinople (born 2003), American ice hockey player
- Konstantinopol, Russian TV series
- Constantia (Osrhoene), also known as Constantinopolis, an ancient city in Mesopotamia

== See also ==
- Byzantium (disambiguation)
- Constantine (disambiguation)
- Istanbul (disambiguation)
- New Rome (disambiguation)
- Nova Roma (disambiguation)
- Second Rome (disambiguation)
- Ecumenical Patriarch of Constantinople
- Names of Istanbul
