= Rome Township, Ohio =

Rome Township, Ohio may refer to:

- Rome Township, Ashtabula County, Ohio
- Rome Township, Athens County, Ohio
- Rome Township, Lawrence County, Ohio

== See also ==
- Rome, Ohio (disambiguation)
