= Second Rome =

Second Rome most commonly refers to Constantinople, which was the capital of the Roman Empire from 330 onwards, lasting as the capital for the subsequent Byzantine Empire until its fall in 1453. The term may also refer to:

- Holy Roman Empire, as a "second Roman Empire" through translatio imperii.
- Papal States, as the state governing Rome itself through most of the Middle Ages.

== See also ==
- Nova Roma (disambiguation)
- New Rome (disambiguation)
- Rome II (disambiguation)
- Rome (disambiguation)
- Third Rome
