= Last Roman Emperor (disambiguation) =

The Last Roman Emperor was a legendary figure in medieval Christian eschatology.

Last Roman Emperor may also refer to:

- Romulus Augustulus (r. 475–476), de facto last Western Roman Emperor
- Julius Nepos (r. 474–480), de jure last Western Roman Emperor
- Constantine VI (r. 780–797), last emperor to be contemporaneously recognized universally as Roman Emperor
- Constantine XI Palaiologos (r. 1449–1453), last Byzantine (Eastern Roman) Emperor
- Francis II (r. 1792–1806), last Holy Roman Emperor
- Andreas Palaiologos (d. 1502), last legitimate claimant to the Byzantine throne

== See also ==
- Last of the Romans, Ultimus Romanorum
- Roman Empire (disambiguation)
