= Latino =

Latino or Latinos may refer to:

== People ==
=== Demographics ===
- Latino (demonym), a term used in the United States for people with cultural ties to Latin America
- Hispanic and Latino Americans in the United States
  - Hispanic and Latino (ethnic categories)
- The people or cultures of Latin America;
  - Latin Americans
- People from the Romance-speaking world

=== Given name ===
- Latino Galasso, Italian rower
- Latino Latini, Italian scholar and humanist of the Renaissance
- Latino Malabranca Orsini, Italian cardinal
- Latino Orsini, Italian cardinal

=== Other names ===
- Joseph Nunzio Latino, Italian American Roman Catholic bishop
- Latino (singer), Brazilian singer

== Linguistics ==
- Latino-Faliscan languages, languages of ancient Italy
- Latino sine flexione, a constructed language
- Mozarabic language, varieties of Ibero-Romance
- A historical name for the Judeo-Italian languages

== Geography ==
- Lazio region in Italy, anciently inhabited by the Latin people who founded the city of Rome

== Media and entertainment ==
=== Music ===
- Latino (album), an album by Sebastian Santa Maria
- Latino, album by Miloš Karadaglić
- "Latino", winning song from Spain in the OTI Festival, 1981

=== Other media ===
- Latino (film), from 1985
- Latinos (newspaper series)

== Other uses ==
- Latino (grape), an Italian wine grape
- Mascalzone Latino, an Italian yacht racing team

== See also ==
- Hispanic
- Latini (surname)
- Ladino (disambiguation)
- Latin (disambiguation)
- Latina (disambiguation)
