= New Roman Empire =

Various entities have claimed to be or could be considered the new Roman Empire. These include but are not limited to:

- The Byzantine Empire (330–1453), born out of the split of the original Roman Empire between west and east.
- The Carolingian Empire (800–887)
- The Holy Roman Empire (800–924, 962–1806)
- The Latin Empire (1204–1261), a Crusader state established during the 4th Crusade in Byzantine lands
- The Italian Empire (1882–1960), the Italian colonial empire
- Fascist Italy (1922-1943), which was part of the Italian Empire, but was when it was ruled by the National Fascist Party

== See also ==
- Moscow, third Rome (since the 16th century), Tsardom and Empire of Muscovy, the Russian Empire, the self-declared successor of Constantinople
- Translatio imperii
- Roman Empire (disambiguation)
- New Rome (disambiguation)
