= Byzantines (disambiguation) =

The Byzantines were Roman people during the Byzantine period, when political control was administered from Constantinople.

Byzantines may also refer to:

- The citizens of the ancient Greek city of Byzantium

== See also ==
- Byzantine (disambiguation)
- Armenians in the Byzantine Empire
- History of the Jews in the Byzantine Empire
