= Romanesco =

Romanesco is an Italian adjective meaning "pertinent to the medieval and modern Roman people".

Romanesco may refer to:

- Romanesco dialect, an Italian dialect spoken in the city of Rome and its surroundings
- Romanesco broccoli, a kind of cauliflower

== See also ==
- Romanesca, a melodic-harmonic formula popular in the 16th and 17th centuries
- Romain (disambiguation)
- Romanesque (disambiguation)
- Romanization (disambiguation)
- Romanza (disambiguation)
- Romano (disambiguation)
- Romana (disambiguation)
