= Sack of Rome =

Sack of Rome may refer to:

== Historical events ==
- Sack of Rome (390 BC) following the Battle of the Allia, by Brennus, king of the Senone Gauls
- Sack of Rome (410), by the Visigoths under Alaric I
- Sack of Rome (455), by the Vandals under Gaiseric
- Siege of Rome (472), by the Western Roman general Ricimer
- Sack of Rome (546), by the Ostrogoths under King Totila
- Siege of Rome (549–550), also by Totila
- The Muslim raid on Rome in 846
- Sack of Rome (1084), by the adventurer Robert Guiscard's Normans
- Sack of Rome (1527), by mercenary troops of the Holy Roman Emperor Charles V

== Other uses ==
- The Sack of Rome (film), a 1920 Italian film depicting the 1527 event
- The Sack of Rome: How a Beautiful European Country with a Fabled History and a Storied Culture Was Taken Over by a Man Named Silvio Berlusconi, a book by Alexander Stille
- Le sac de Rome, an essay by André Chastel
- "Sack of Rome", a chess tournament victory by Sofia Polgar

== See also ==
- Battle for Rome (disambiguation)
- Battle of Rome (disambiguation)
- Capture of Rome
- Fall of Rome (disambiguation)
- Siege of Rome (disambiguation)
