= Suppression subtractive hybridization =

Subtractive hybridization is a technology that allows for PCR-based amplification of only cDNA fragments that differ between a control (driver) and experimental transcriptome. cDNA is produced from mRNA. Differences in relative abundance of transcripts are highlighted, as are genetic differences between species. The technique relies on the removal of dsDNA formed by hybridization between a control and test sample, thus eliminating cDNAs or gDNAs of similar abundance, and retaining differentially expressed, or variable in sequence, transcripts or genomic sequences.

Suppression subtractive hybridization has also been successfully used to identify strain- or species-specific DNA sequences in a variety of bacteria including Vibrio species (Metagenomics).

== See also ==
- Representational difference analysis
