= Roma (surname) =

The surname Roma is shared by several people:

== In arts and entertainment ==
- Caro Roma or Carrie Northey (1866–1937), American singer and composer
- David Roma (born 1974), American television producer, filmmaker and entrepreneur
- José Roma (1784–1847), Spanish painter
- Lisa Roma (1893–1965), American soprano
- Paul Roma, ring name of Paul Centopani (born 1960), American professional wrestler
- Spiridone Roma (1737–1781), Italian painter
- Thomas Roma (born 1950), American photographer

== In sport ==
- Antonio Roma (1932–2013), Argentine footballer
- Bruno David Roma (born 1989), Brazilian footballer
- Dominic Roma (born 1985), English footballer
- Flavio Roma (born 1974), Italian footballer
- Nani Roma (born 1972), Spanish rally car driver
- Paul Roma, ring name of Paul Centopani (born 1960), American professional wrestler
- Pedro Roma (born 1970), Portuguese football player
- Sandra Roma (born 1990), Swedish tennis player
- Sofía Roma (born 1996), Puerto Rican basketball player

== Other people ==
- Giulio Roma (1584–1652), Italian Catholic cardinal
- Jean Pierre Roma (18th century), French settler in Canada
- Tony Roma (died 2003), American restaurateur
