= Latinisation =

Latinisation or Latinization can refer to:

- Latinisation of names, the practice of rendering a non-Latin name in a Latin style
- Latinisation in the Soviet Union, the campaign in the USSR during the 1920s and 1930s to replace traditional writing systems for numerous languages with the Latin alphabet
- Pinyin Romanization of Chinese or the earlier Latinxua Sin Wenz campaign in China, which originally sought to replace traditional Chinese characters with the Latin alphabet
- Liturgical Latinisation, the adoption of practices from the Latin Church by the non-Latin Christians
- Re-latinization of Romanian, process by which the Latin features of the Romanian language were strengthened
- Latinism, a word, idiom, or structure derived from, or suggestive of, the Latin language; an aspect of Latinisation
- Romanization, the conversion of writing from a different writing system to the Roman (Latin) script
  - Romanization of Arabic
  - Romanization of Armenian
  - Romanisation of Bengali
  - Romanization of Burmese
  - Romanization of Chinese
  - Romanization of Cyrillic
  - Romanization of Devanagari
  - Romanization of Georgian
  - Romanization of Greek
  - Romanization of Hindi-Urdu (Hindustani)
  - Romanization of Japanese
  - Romanization of Khmer
  - Romanization of Korean
  - Romanization of Lao
  - Romanization of Malayalam
  - Romanization of Persian
  - Romanisation of Sindhi
  - Romanization of Telugu
  - Romanization of Thai
  - Romanization of Urdu-Hindi
- Romanization (cultural), the acculturation, integration, assimilation, of newly incorporated and peripheral populations by the Roman Republic and Roman Empire

== See also ==
- Latin (disambiguation)
- List of Latinised names
- Binomial nomenclature a formal system of naming species of living things by giving each a name composed of two parts, both of which use Latin grammatical forms
- Romanization (disambiguation)
- Transliteration or transcription into the Latin alphabet
