= Paul Rofe =

Paul Rofe may refer to:

- Paul Rofe (barrister) (1948–2013), South Australian Director of Public Prosecutions
- Paul Rofe (cricketer) (born 1981), played for South Australia and Northamptonshire
