= Byzantium (disambiguation) =

Byzantium is an ancient Greek city, later renamed Constantinople and then Istanbul.

Byzantium may also refer to:

== Arts, entertainment, and media ==
- Byzantium (album), by Deep Blue Something
- Byzantium (band), an English band of the 1970s
- Byzantium (film), a 2012 vampire film
- Byzantium (play), a 1904 historical play by Ferenc Herczeg
- Byzantium, a starship on the Doctor Who episode "The Time of Angels"
- Byzantium!, a Doctor Who novel by Keith Topping
- Byzantium, a novel by Stephen R. Lawhead
- Byzantium, title of season 7, episode 11, of The Mentalist
- Byzantium, title of season 14, episode 8, of Supernatural
- Byzantium, a poem by W. B. Yeats, published in The Winding Stair and Other Poems

== Other uses ==
- Byzantium (color)
- Byzantine Empire, is the political term to refer to Byzantium (330–1453) of which Constantinople was the capital
- MV Byzantium, a Cypriot cargo ship

== See also ==
- Byzantine (disambiguation)
- Constantinople (disambiguation)
- Istanbul (disambiguation)
- The Outer Worlds
