= Siege of Rome =

Siege of Rome may refer to:

- Siege of Rome (508 BC), by Lars Porsena, the Etruscan king of Clusium
- Siege of Rome (221 BC), see Hannibal's March on Rome
- Siege of Rome (390 BC), see Sack of Rome (390 BC)
- Siege of Rome (87 BC), by Gaius Marius and Lucius Cornelius Cinna
- Siege of Rome (69), by Vitellius during the Year of the Four Emperors
- Siege of Rome (408), see Sack of Rome (410)
- Siege of Rome (409), see Sack of Rome (410)
- Siege of Rome (472), by the Western Roman general Ricimer
- Siege of Rome (537–538), by the Ostrogoths under Vitiges
- Siege of Rome (546), by the Ostrogoths under Totila
- Siege of Rome (549–550), by the Ostrogoths again under Totila
- Siege of Rome (756), by the Lombards under Aistulf
- Siege of Rome (1082–1084), by Henry IV, Holy Roman Emperor
- Siege of Rome (1849), by the French Second Republic under Napoleon III

== See also ==
- Muslim raid on Rome (846)
- Capture of Rome (1870), by the Kingdom of Italy
- Liberation of Rome (1944), by the Allies during World War II
- Fall of Rome (disambiguation)
- Sack of Rome (disambiguation)
- Battle of Rome (disambiguation)
- Battle for Rome (disambiguation)
