= Decline and fall of the Roman Empire =

Decline and fall of the Roman Empire may refer to:

- Fall of the Western Roman Empire
- The History of the Decline and Fall of the Roman Empire by Edward Gibbon

== See also ==
- Late antiquity, the era of the decline and fall of Rome (Western Roman Empire)
- Historiography of the fall of the Western Roman Empire
- The Fall of the Roman Empire (film), 1964 U.S. film
- Roman Empire (disambiguation)
- Fall of Rome (disambiguation)
