= Byzantine (disambiguation) =

The Byzantine Empire was the medieval Eastern Roman Empire, that evolved after the fall of the Western Roman Empire in the 5th century and fell in the 15th century.

Byzantine may also refer to:

== Byzantine Empire, religion, and culture ==
- Byzantines
- Byzantine architecture
  - Byzantine Revival architecture, a.k.a. Neo-Byzantine architecture, an historicist or revival style
- Byzantine art
- Byzantine music
- Byzantine literature
- Byzantine Greek, or Medieval Greek, the form of the Greek language spoken in the Byzantine Empire during the Middle Ages
- Byzantine Rite, an ecclesial rite in the Eastern Catholic Churches and the Eastern Orthodox Church
- Byzantine text-type (also called Antiocheian Text, Constantinopolitan Text, Ecclesiastical Text, Majority Text, Syrian Text, or Traditional Text), one of several text-types used in textual criticism to describe the textual character of Greek New Testament manuscripts
- List of Byzantine emperors

== Arts, entertainment, and media ==
- Byzantine (album), 2013 album by Byzantine
- Byzantine (band), a heavy metal band from West Virginia, United States
- Byzantine (video game)
- "Byzantine" (song), from 2019 Weezer album

== Other uses ==
- Byzantine fault, a type of fault affecting system consensus in computer science

== See also ==
- Byzantinism, a modern comparison to the complexity of the political apparatus of the Byzantine empire
- Byzantines (disambiguation)
- Byzantium (disambiguation)
