= Latina =

Latina or Latinas most often refers to:

- Latinas, a demographic group in the US
- Latino (demonym), a term used in the US for people with cultural ties to Latin America
- Latin Americans, citizens of Latin American countries

Latina and Latinas may also refer to:

== Arts and entertainment ==
- Latina (magazine), a monthly American magazine
- Latina, an album by Cristina Pato
- Latina (album), 2016, by Thalía
- "Latina", a song on the 1967 album High Blues Pressure
- "Latina", a song on the 1994 album Love Will Find a Way
- "Latina", a song on the 2014 album TZN - The Best of Tiziano Ferro

== Places ==
=== Italy ===
- Province of Latina, a province in Latium (Lazio)
  - Latina, Lazio, the capital of the province of Latina
  - Latina Nuclear Power Plant
- Valle Latina, a valley of Lazio, Italy, from south of Rome to Cassino

=== Spain ===
- Latina (Madrid), a district of Madrid
- Barrio de La Latina (Madrid), a neighbourhood of Madrid

== Language and science ==
- Lingua latina or Latin, from the Latin name of the language
- Latina (wasp), a genus of parasitic wasps
- Latina (architecture), a type of Indian shikhara (tower or spire on top of a shrine)

== Other uses ==
- Latina Calcio 1932, an Italian football club
- Latina Televisión, a Peruvian television channel

== See also ==
- Latin (disambiguation)
- Latino (disambiguation)
