= TCG Istanbul =

TCG Istanbul is the name of the following ships of the Turkish Navy, named for Istanbul:

- TCG Istanbul (D 340), ex-USS Clarence K. Bronson, a Fletcher-class destroyer transferred to Turkey in 1967, scrapped in 1987
- TCG Istanbul (F 515), lead Istanbul-class frigate, commissioned in 2024

== See also ==
- Istanbul (disambiguation)
