= Roman Republic (disambiguation) =

The Roman Republic was the phase of Ancient Roman civilization characterized by a republican form of government.

Roman Republic may also refer to:

- Commune of Rome, an attempt to re-establish a republican form of government in Rome during the 12th century
- The regime established by Cola di Rienzo (May–December 1347)
- Roman Republic (1798–1799), a state that existed in Italy from 1798 to 1800 as a client republic under the French Directory
- Roman Republic (1849–1850), a short-lived Italian revolutionary state that lasted from 1849 to 1850

== See also ==
- Republic of Rome (game), a 1990 strategy board game
- Roman Empire (disambiguation)
- Ancient Rome (disambiguation)
