= Istanbul Square =

Roundabout in Lahore, Pakistan

- Roundabout
- Urdu: Istanbul Chowk
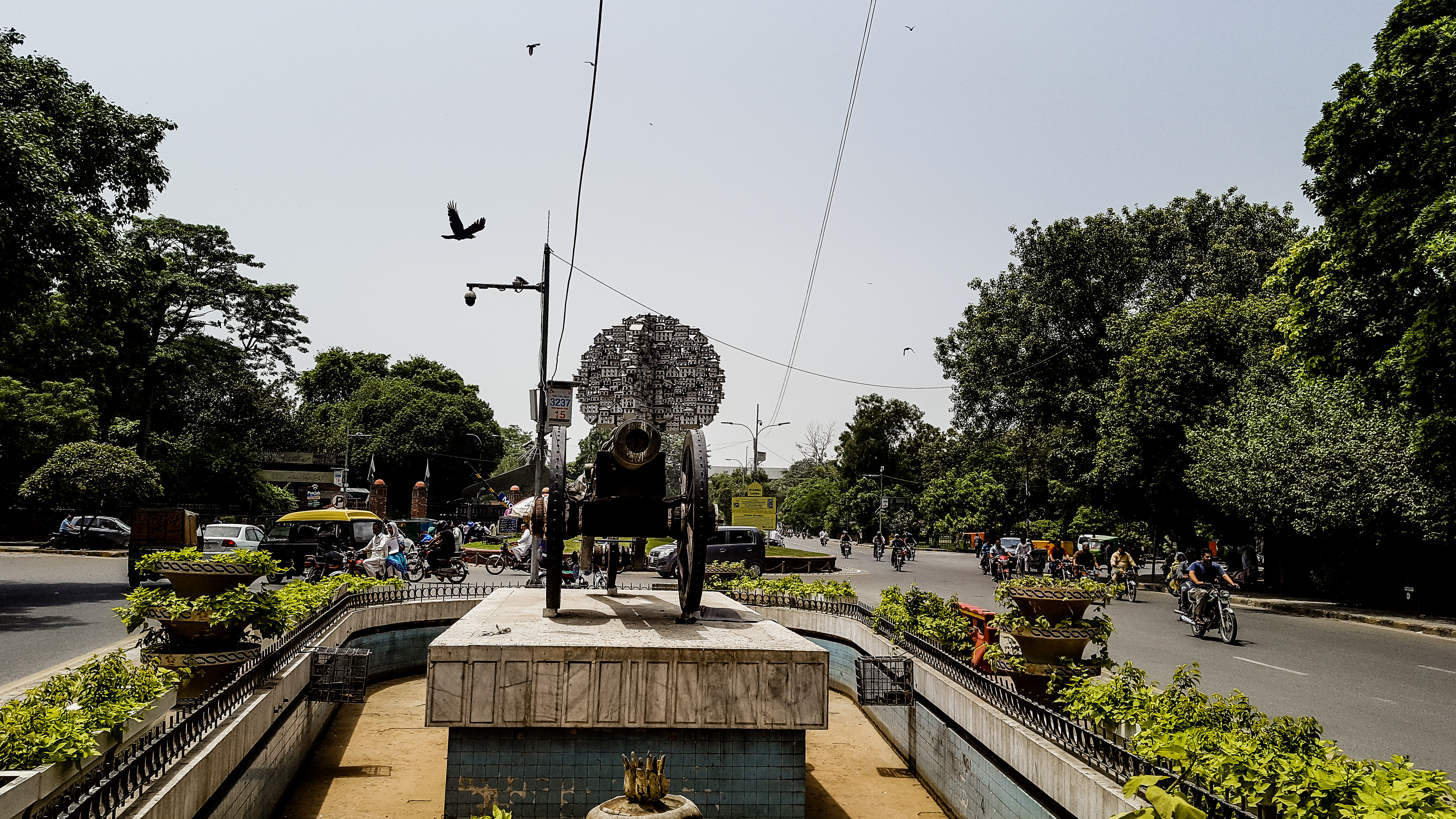
- Opened: Public
- Location: Lahore, Pakistan
- Interactive map of Istanbul Square
- Coordinates: 31.569058°N 74.307012°E

Istanbul Square is a roundabout at the intersection of Mall Road and Prof. Ashfaq Ali Khan Road in the heart of Lahore, Pakistan. It is named after Istanbul, Turkey, the sister city of Lahore.

The square was designed by architects from Punjab University, University of Engineering and Technology, the National College of Arts and the Alama Iqbal Campus of the University of the Punjab. The new design has a tall pole in the middle of the square with hundreds of small birdhouses on it. Mainly pigeons use these houses and the city folk come to feed these pigeons. The square was already called Istanbul Chowk; however it had no special design and only had a boat fixed to it.
