= Roman Empire (disambiguation) =

The Roman Empire usually refers to the post-republican, autocratic government period of Roman civilization, centered on the city of Rome on the Italian peninsula from 27 BC to AD 330, and in Constantinople on the Bosporus from 330 to 1453.

Roman Empire may also refer to:

- Ancient Rome (753 BC – AD 476), the entire period of ancient Western Roman civilisation, including the Kingdom, Republic and part of the Imperial periods
- Roman Republic (509 BC – 44 BC), the period of the ancient Roman civilization when its government operated as a republic
- The two administrative divisions of the empire during the late imperial period:
  - Eastern Roman Empire (395–1453), also known as the Byzantine Empire, the eastern half of the Roman Empire, juridically simply the "Roman Empire" after AD 480
  - Western Roman Empire (395–476/480), the western half of the Roman Empire
- Holy Roman Empire (800–1806), a decentralised political entity

== Other uses ==
- Roman Empire (TV series), 2016 American documentary television series
- "Roman Empire", 2026 song by Bang Chan from SKZ-Replay 2026 Pt.1

== See also ==
- Holy Roman Empire
- Latin Empire
- Romania
- Rumelia
- Roman's Empire, a comedy television show on BBC Two
- The Fall of the Roman Empire (film), a 1964 epic film by Paramount Pictures
- Rome (disambiguation)
- Roman Republic (disambiguation)
- Ancient Rome (disambiguation)
- Decline and fall of the Roman Empire (disambiguation)
- History of Rome
- Decline of the Roman Empire
- Fall of the Western Roman Empire
- New Roman Empire (disambiguation)
