= Rome Township =

Rome Township may refer to:

- Rome Township, Jefferson County, Illinois
- Rome Township, Jones County, Iowa
- Rome Township, Lenawee County, Michigan
- Rome Township, Faribault County, Minnesota
- Rome Township, Ashtabula County, Ohio
- Rome Township, Athens County, Ohio
- Rome Township, Lawrence County, Ohio
- Rome Township, Bradford County, Pennsylvania
- Rome Township, Crawford County, Pennsylvania
- Rome Township, Davison County, South Dakota, in Davison County, South Dakota
- Rome Township, Deuel County, South Dakota, in Deuel County, South Dakota
