= Romanesque =

Romanesque may refer to:

== In art and architecture ==
- First Romanesque, or Lombard Romanesque architectural style
- Pre-Romanesque art and architecture, a term used for the early phase of the style
- Romanesque architecture, architecture of Europe which emerged in the late 10th century and lasted to the 13th century
  - Pisan Romanesque
  - Romanesque secular and domestic architecture
  - Brick Romanesque, North Germany and Baltic
  - Norman architecture, the traditional term for the style in English
  - Spanish Romanesque
  - Romanesque architecture in France
- Romanesque art, the art of Western Europe from approximately AD 1000 to the 13th century or later
- Romanesque Revival architecture, an architectural style which started in the mid-19th century, inspired by the original Romanesque architecture
  - Richardsonian Romanesque, a style of Romanesque Revival architecture named for an American architect

== Other uses ==
- Romanesque (EP), EP by Japanese rock band Buck-Tick
- "Romanesque" (song), a 2007 single by Japanese pop duo FictionJunction Yuuka
- Romanesque Road, a scenic route in Germany

== See also ==
- Romanesco (disambiguation)
