= Representational oligonucleotide microarray analysis =

ROMA

Representational oligonucleotide microarray analysis (ROMA) is a technique that was developed by Michael Wigler and Rob Lucito at the Cold Spring Harbor Laboratory (CSHL) in 2003. Wigler and Lucito currently run laboratories at CSHL using ROMA to explore genomic copy number variation in cancer and other genetic diseases.

In this technique, two genomes are compared for their differences in copy number on a microarray. The ROMA technology emerged from a previous method called representational difference analysis (RDA). ROMA, in comparison to other comparative genomic hybridization (CGH) techniques, has the advantage of reducing the complexity of a genome with a restriction enzyme which highly increases the efficiency of genomic fragment hybridization to a microarray.

In ROMA, a genome is digested with a restriction enzyme, ligated with adapters specific to the restriction fragment sticky ends and amplified by PCR. After the PCR step, representations of the entire genome (restriction fragments) are amplified to pronounce relative increases, decreases or preserve equal copy number in the two genomes. The representations of the two different genomes are labeled with different fluorophores and co-hybridized to a microarray with probes specific to locations across the entire human genome. After analysis of the ROMA microarray image is completed, a copy number profile of the entire human genome is generated. This allows researchers to detect with high accuracy amplifications (amplicons) and deletions that occur across the entire genome.

In cancer, the genome becomes very unstable, resulting in specific regions that may be deleted (if they contain a tumor suppressor) or amplified (if they contain an oncogene). Amplifications and deletions have also been observed in the normal human population and are referred to as Copy Number Polymorphisms (CNPs). Jonathan Sebat was one of the first researchers to report in the journal 'Science' in 2004 that these CNPs give rise to human genomic variation and may contribute to our phenotypic differences. Tremendous research efforts are being conducted now to understand the role of CNPs in normal human variation and neurological diseases such as autism. By understanding which regions of the genome have undergone copy number polymorphisms in disease, scientists can ultimately identify genes that are overexpressed or deleted and design drugs to compensate for these genes to cure genetic diseases.
