= Ladino (surname) =

Ladino is a Surname of Iberian-Jewish origin. It usually Indicates someone who natively speaks Ladino or someone of Spanish/Portuguese-Jewish descent. Notable people with the surname include:

- Gregorio Ladino (born 1973), Colombian road cyclist
- Santiago Ladino (born 1980), Argentine footballer
