= Istanbul Monorail =

Proposed mass transit system in Istanbul, Turkey

Istanbul Monorail was a proposed monorail mass transit system in Istanbul, Turkey.

The monorail line would have been between Küçükçekmece and Başakşehir via Sefaköy. The length of the line was proposed to be 15 km (9.3 mi) and the total travel time between the termini would have taken 27 minutes, with a capacity of carrying hourly 15,000 riders in one direction. 30 trains were planned with 17 monorail stations, such as Sefaköy, Armoni Park, Borusan, Sanayi, Gümrük Yolu, Halkalı Merkez, Toki-1, Toki-2, Arena Park (Atakent), Masko, Ziya Gökalp, Atatürk Oto Sanayi 1, Atatürk Oto Sanayi 2, Başakkonutları, Onurkent, Oyakkentand Fatih Terim Stadium. The monorail line would have connected to metro lines of Kirazlı-Halkalı at Halkalı Merkez station, of Yenikapı-İncirli-Sefaköy-Beylikdüzü at Sefaköy, of Mahmutbey-Bahçeşehir-Esenyurt at Arena Park and of Otogar-Bağcılar-Başakşehir at Başakşehir Konutları station.

The project was governed by Istanbul Metropolitan Municipality. The tender for the construction of the monorail system was won by Alsim, a subsidiary of Alarko Holding. It was reported that the construction would begin in April 2017. The completion of the project was expected for the first half of 2019. The construction cost was budgeted to ₺ 1.292 billion (approx. US$ 350 million).

The project was cancelled in 2017.
