= Rome Airport =

Rome Airport may refer to:

In Rome, Italy:

- In service:
  - Rome Ciampino Airport in Ciampino, Italy, near the city centre of Rome (IATA/ICAO: CIA/LIRA)
  - Rome Fiumicino Airport, international airport in Fiumicino, Italy, near the city centre of Rome (IATA/ICAO: FCO/LIRF)
  - Rome Urbe Airport in Rome, Italy (ICAO: LIRU)
- Out of service:
  - Centocelle Airport, in Centocelle, Rome, Italy (IATA/ICAO: none/LIRC)
  - Rome Viterbo Airport, in Viterbo, Italy

In the United States:

- Rome State Airport in Rome, Oregon, United States (FAA/IATA: REO)
- Becks Grove Airport in Rome, New York, United States (FAA: K16)
- Griffiss International Airport in Rome, New York, United States (FAA/IATA: RME)
- Richard B. Russell Airport in Rome, Georgia, United States (FAA/IATA: RMG)
