= Rhome =

Rhome may refer to:

- Rhome, Texas, United States, a city
- Jerry Rhome (born 1942), American former National Football League quarterback
- Rhome Nixon (born 1944), retired Canadian Football League player
