= Representational difference analysis =

Representational difference analysis (RDA) is a technique used in biological research to find sequence differences in two genomic or cDNA samples. Genomes or cDNA sequences from two samples (i.e. cancer sample and a normal sample) are PCR amplified and differences analyzed using subtractive DNA hybridization. This technology has been further enhanced through the development of representation oligonucleotide microarray analysis (ROMA), which uses array technology to perform such analyses. This method may also be adapted to detect DNA methylation differences, as seen in methylation-sensitive representational difference analysis (MS-RDA).

== Theory ==
This method relies on PCR to differentially amplify non-homologous DNA regions between digested fragments of two nearly identical DNA species, that are called 'driver' and 'tester' DNA. Typically, tester DNA contains a sequence of interest that is non-homologous to driver DNA. When the two species are mixed, the driver sequence is added in excess to tester. During PCR, double stranded fragments first denature at ~95 °C and then re-anneal when subjected to the annealing temperature. Since driver and tester sequences are nearly identical, the excess of driver DNA fragments will anneal to homologous DNA fragments from the tester species. This blocks PCR amplification and there is no increase in homologous fragments. However, fragments that are different between the two species will not anneal to a complementary counterpart and will be amplified by PCR. As more cycles of RDA are performed, the pool of unique sequence fragment copies will grow faster than fragments found in both species.
