= Latin (George Dalaras album) =

Studio album by George Dalaras

Latin is a 1987 double album by George Dalaras containing Greek-language adaptations of Latin-American songs, featuring Al Di Meola, Glykeria, and Alkistis Protopsalti. The album was a commercial and critical success for Dalaras in Greece, selling nearly half a million copies. It is one of several Dalaras albums to feature Al Di Meola.
