= Ancient Roman: Power of Dark Side =

1998 video game

- Publisher: Fuga System
- Platform: PlayStation
- Release: JP: 1998
- Genre: Role-playing

Ancient Roman: Power of Dark Side (Note: アンシャントロマン 〜Power of Dark Side〜 (Anshantoroman ~Power of Dark Side~). The katakana used for "Ancient" is non-standard. "Roman" is used in the sense of a heroic romance, not in the sense of the Ancient Roman civilization.) is a 1998 role-playing game released for the PlayStation, exclusively in the Japanese market. The game was published by the company Fuga System. Like many PlayStation games of the era, it uses 3D graphics.

The game received a harshly negative reception from critics upon release. It is mainly known in retrospect as a kusoge game, a game that attracts interest from retro gamers because of its poor quality.

== Plot ==
Kai Orpheus (カイ・オルフェアス (Kai Orufeasu)) is kidnapped as a young child by a demon, and forced to grow up as a slave laboring in mines. After he overhears a plan to murder all the enslaved miners, he escapes, and sets out on an adventure.

== Development and release ==
The game was produced by Fuga System, known for creating the Amaranth series of dungeon crawlers for the PC-98. Not much is known about the specifics of development, although a common point of speculation is that the designers seemed to be inspired by the extremely popular 1997 PlayStation game Final Fantasy VII, as the game features a loose approximation of its style.

According to 2021 Twitter (now X) posts from Fūga, a former artist at Fuga System, he was the only employee from Fuga System to have significant interaction with Ancient Roman. Most of the work was done by "Nihon System", a separate, recently-created production company (albeit one where Fuga's president, Nobumi Uragi, was an executive). Fūga (the employee) wrote that nobody at the newly-formed Nihon System had ever made a game before, and that Fuga System (the company)'s involvement was not substantial.

Ancient Roman was released on April 23, 1998.

== Reception ==
The game received harshly negative reviews on release. Famitsu magazine gave it a 21/40, a very low score. The reviewer criticized the clumsy controls, poor UI, small character figures compared to the pre-rendered backgrounds, and poor game balance. Reviewers at Dengeki PlayStation gave an average score of 47.5/100, and criticized the loading times as too long, the soundtrack as unpleasant, and the poor experience in simply maneuvering around the map. The one thing both reviews praised were the prerendered full-motion video cinematics, which were acknowledged to be good.

Later interest in the game has generally been from aficionados of bad games, called kuso or kusoge games. The game was listed in a 2017 book of PlayStation kuso games, where it noted that the 3D graphics technology the game used was already outdated in 1998. Perhaps due to a lack of budget, the town graphics were always reduced to just one heavily zoomed-out screen, making the character and townspeople too small.

A 2021 retrospective by Kurt Kalata called the game "laughably amateurish" and "hilariously inept" as far as being a Final Fantasy VII follow-up. He granted some minor appeal in the "surreal" 3D battle graphics where the enemies appeared almost like origami, and inexplicably flew into the sky upon defeat. He wrote that the cinematics were more unintentionally humorous than dramatic, and that the battle balance was not good.
