= LATIN =

LATIN (always referenced in upper case) was a cooperation scheme among 13 newspapers in Latin America which was organized by Reuters and lasted from 1970 until 1981. It was not a news agency per se, but rather a permanent exchange mechanism. In 1975, The New York Times revealed that LATIN was used by the CIA to in covert operations of counterinformation and influencing public opinion in Latin America.

Today, similar schemes are carried through the Periódicos Asociados Latinoamericanos and Grupo de Diarios América.
