= Istanbul Airport (disambiguation) =

Istanbul Airport is a public use airport in Istanbul, Turkey, located within the district of Arnavutköy on the European side (IATA: IST; ICAO: LTFM).

Istanbul Airport may also refer to:

- Istanbul Atatürk Airport (ISL), located on the European side of Istanbul, within the district of Bakırköy, operated from 1923 to 2022, served as passengers until 2019
- Istanbul Sabiha Gökçen International Airport (SAW), located on the Asian side of Istanbul, within the district of Pendik, operated since 2001 mostly serving low-cost airlines
