= Roma (given name) =

Roma is a unisex given name in many languages, and is the feminine form of the name Roman in some languages. In Italian, it is a toponymic name that stems from the city of Rome. It can also be from Latin, romanus, or other cities called Roma in Valencia and Galicia.In India, it is another name for the goddess Lakshmi and can be used for boys and girls.

== Notable people ==
- Roma Balzer (born 1954), New Zealand community worker
- Roma Downey, Northern Irish actress
- Roma Gąsiorowska, Polish actress and fashion designer
- Roma Guillon Le Thière (c. 1837–1903), Italian actress
- Roma Ligocka, Polish writer and painter
- Roma Maffia, American actress
- Roma Manek, Gujarati actress
- Roma Ryan, Northern Irish writer, poet, and lyricist
- Roma Torre, American television journalist and theater critic
