= Romanization (disambiguation) =

Romanization is the representation in the Latin script of a language normally written in another writing system. Romanization may also refer to:

- Romanization (cultural), the expansion of Roman culture, law, and language
- Latinisation of names, practice of rendering a non-Latin name (or word) in a Latin style
- Latinisation in the Soviet Union, the Latinization of languages inside the former USSR
- Liturgical Latinisation, the practice of modifying Eastern Christian liturgical rites of the Catholic Church and other Christian bodies to more resemble the Latin liturgical rites
- Representation in roman type of formerly italicized foreign words and phrases after they have become assimilated into English

== See also ==
- Roma (disambiguation)
- Latinisation (disambiguation)
