= Istanbul Summit =

Istanbul Summit may refer to:

- 1999 Istanbul summit (6th OSCE summit)
- 2002 Istanbul summit (7th ECO summit)
- 2004 Istanbul summit (17th NATO summit)
