= Répertoire opérationnel des métiers et des emplois =

French job skillset directory

Agency overview
- Formed: 1989
- Jurisdiction: France
- Parent agency: Pôle emploi
- Website: https://www.pole-emploi.fr/employeur/vos-recrutements/le-rome-et-les-fiches-metiers.html

The Répertoire opérationnel des métiers et des emplois (ROME), or, in English, the Operational Directory of Trades and Jobs, is a French job skillset directory. It was made in 1989 by the Agence nationale pour l'emploi, which became the Pôle emploi, in France. It puts jobs into categories of skill sets. It catalogs more than 10,000 jobs. Its nomenclature and classifications are used by other organizations. ROME is used to characterize professional families (FAP).

== History ==
ROME is one of nine databases created by the loi pour une République Numérique on 7 October 2016, collectively called Lemaire. The decree of application 2017-331 of 14 March 2017 relating to public service established the system. The current version is 4.0.

=== 2009 Version ===
The 2009 version listed 531 records, listing over 10,000 jobs. Each job is characterized by a code made up of four characters and three parts:

- A letter signifies the job family.
- The next two characters are numbers and identify the professional domain.
- The final number is a specific job identifier.
