= Rome (surname) =

Rome is a surname. Notable people with the surname include:

- Aaron Rome (born 1983), Canadian professional ice hockey defenceman
- Adam Rome, American environmental historian
- Adolphe Rome (1889–1971), Belgian classical philologist and science historian
- Ashton Rome (born 1985), Canadian professional ice hockey winger
- David Rome (1910–1970), English cricketer
- Edith MacGregor Rome (died 1938), British nursing matron and administrator
- Esther Rome (1945–1995), American women's health activist and writer
- Francis Rome (1905–1985), Commandant of the British Sector in Berlin
- Harold Rome (1908–1993), American composer
- Jerry Rhome (born 1942), American football quarterback
- Jim Rome (born 1964), American sports radio talk show host
- Kevin D. Rome (born c. 1966), African-American university administrator
- Lewis Rome (1933–2015), American politician and university trustee
- Rangsiman Rome (born 1992), Thai politician and activist
- Richie Rome (1930–2020), American conductor and producer
- Sébastien Rome (born 1978), French politician
- Sydne Rome (born 1951), American actress

== Fictional people ==
- Tony Rome, neo-noir detective
