= Rome, Richland County, Ohio =

Unincorporated community in Ohio, U.S.

Coordinates: 40°55′35″N 82°31′49″W

Rome is an unincorporated community in Richland County, in the U.S. state of Ohio.

== History ==
The community was named after Rome, New York, according to local history. A variant name was Rives. A post office called Rives was established in 1837, and remained in operation until 1906.
