= Roma (band) =

Roma!
- Origin: United States
- Genres: Glam rock, performance art

Roma! is an American glam rock group.

Roma!'s debut album The Wild Party (2011) was produced by David Barratt.
