= Rome, Morrow County, Ohio =

Coordinates: 40.408755°N 82.705301°W

Rome is a ghost town in South Bloomfield Township, Morrow County, in the U.S. state of Ohio.

== History ==
Rome was laid out in 1827 by Lemuel Potter. The town failed to meet Potter's expectations, as one 19th-century writer remarks "it did not bear any resemblance to ancient Rome".
