= Paul Rofe (cricketer) =

Australian cricketer (born 1981)

Personal information
- Full name: Paul Cameron Rofe
- Born: 16 January 1981 (age 45); Adelaide, Australia
- Batting: Right-handed
- Bowling: Right-arm fast-medium
- Role: Bowler

Domestic team information
- Years: Team
- 2000/01-2008/09: South Australia
- 2004: Northamptonshire

Career statistics
Competition	First-class	LA	T20
Matches	70	41	4
Runs scored	489	19	6
Batting average	7.76	3.16	6.00
100s/50s	-/-	-/-	-/-
Top score	25	6*	6
Balls bowled	14736	1925	54
Wickets	218	41	1
Bowling average	31.66	34.09	89.00
5 wickets in innings	8	-	0
10 wickets in match	1	n/a	0
Best bowling	7/52	3/23	1/24
Catches/stumpings	20/-	3/-	-/–
- Source: Cricinfo, 7 August 2011

Paul Cameron Rofe (born 16 January 1981, Adelaide, South Australia) is a former first-class cricketer who played for South Australia and Northamptonshire.

A right-arm fast bowler, Rofe took 181 first-class wickets at an average of 29.66. His best performance of 7/52 and 13 wickets in the match was in January 2002, against NSW. His limited overs career was less successful, taking 37 wickets at 35.97. He made his first class debut in 2001 against Western Australia having previously represented Australia under-19s from 1999 until 2000.

In July 2026, Paul Rofe pleaded guilty to aggravated assault of his own child, aged 8.
