= Tony Roma's =

American casual dining chain restaurant

Romacorp Inc.
- U.S. logo
- Trade name: Tony Roma's
- Type: Private
- Industry: Restaurants
- Founded: North Miami, Florida (1972; 54 years ago)
- Founder: Tony Roma
- Headquarters: Orlando, Florida, U.S.
- Key people: Mohaimina Haque, Esq. (Interim CEO)
- Products: ribs, steak, chicken, and seafood
- Number of employees: 500
- Website: Tony Roma's U.S.

Romacorp Inc., which does business as Tony Roma's, is an American casual dining chain restaurant specializing in baby back ribs. The first location was established by the founder, Tony Roma, in 1972 in North Miami, Florida. Clint Murchison Jr. purchased a majority stake in the restaurant in 1976, and he and Roma established the jointly owned Roma Corporation. The first international location opened in 1979 in Tokyo, followed by an international expansion with both company-owned stores and franchises. As of 2020, there are over 115 locations on six continents.

== History ==
=== 1972−1999 ===
Tony Roma, the driving force and namesake behind the casual dining eatery, opened the first Tony Roma's in North Miami, Florida, on January 20, 1972. Prior to opening his self-named restaurant, Tony Roma was the food and beverage specialist for the Playboy Club.

Originally a steak and burger restaurant, one weekend, chef David Smith grilled baby back ribs and served them with Tony Roma's BBQ sauce. The ribs proved to be popular, and were added to the permanent menu, and quickly became what Tony Roma's was known for. Tony Roma's menu further expanded to include seafood, pasta, chicken, and sandwiches.

Four years later, in 1976, Clint Murchison Jr., the owner of the Dallas Cowboys, was in Miami for Super Bowl X. Murchison purchased the majority stake in the restaurant, going on to become the driving force behind Tony Roma's international expansion. Murchison and Roma established Roma Corporation, a jointly owned company that oversaw the restaurants and sold franchises.

In 1979, the first international location opened in Tokyo, Japan, and by 1983; there were 30 Tony Roma's restaurants around the world. During the mid-1980s, Roma Corp's growth plan included opening more franchises, rather than company-owned stores.

Murchison sold his shares in Roma Corp to his children in 1984, and Kenneth Reimer, a Murchison business associate, took over as CEO of Roma. Tony Roma himself also sold his interest in the company to the Murchison children.

=== 2000–present ===
Under Reimer, Tony Roma's expanded, growing the menu, opening more locations, and remodeling older restaurants for a more modern feel. In 2002, Frank Steed took over as CEO and president of Roma Corp and David Grail became head of menu development. Steed signed agreements to open an additional 60 Tony Roma's across South America, Europe, and the Middle East.

In 2001, original head chef David Smith retired and Tony Roma's first executive chef, Bob Gallagher, came on board in 2006. In 2003, Tony Roma died in Hemet, California, at the age of 78.

As of 2006, there were 1,725 employees.

On March 3, 2015, Tony Roma's launched TR Fire Grill in Orlando, Florida, with more locations planned for the following months.

In June 2023, it named Mohaimina “Mina” Haque as CEO. Haque, an attorney with a particular emphasis in franchise law, became the first female CEO in Tony Roma's history.

== Menu and retail products ==
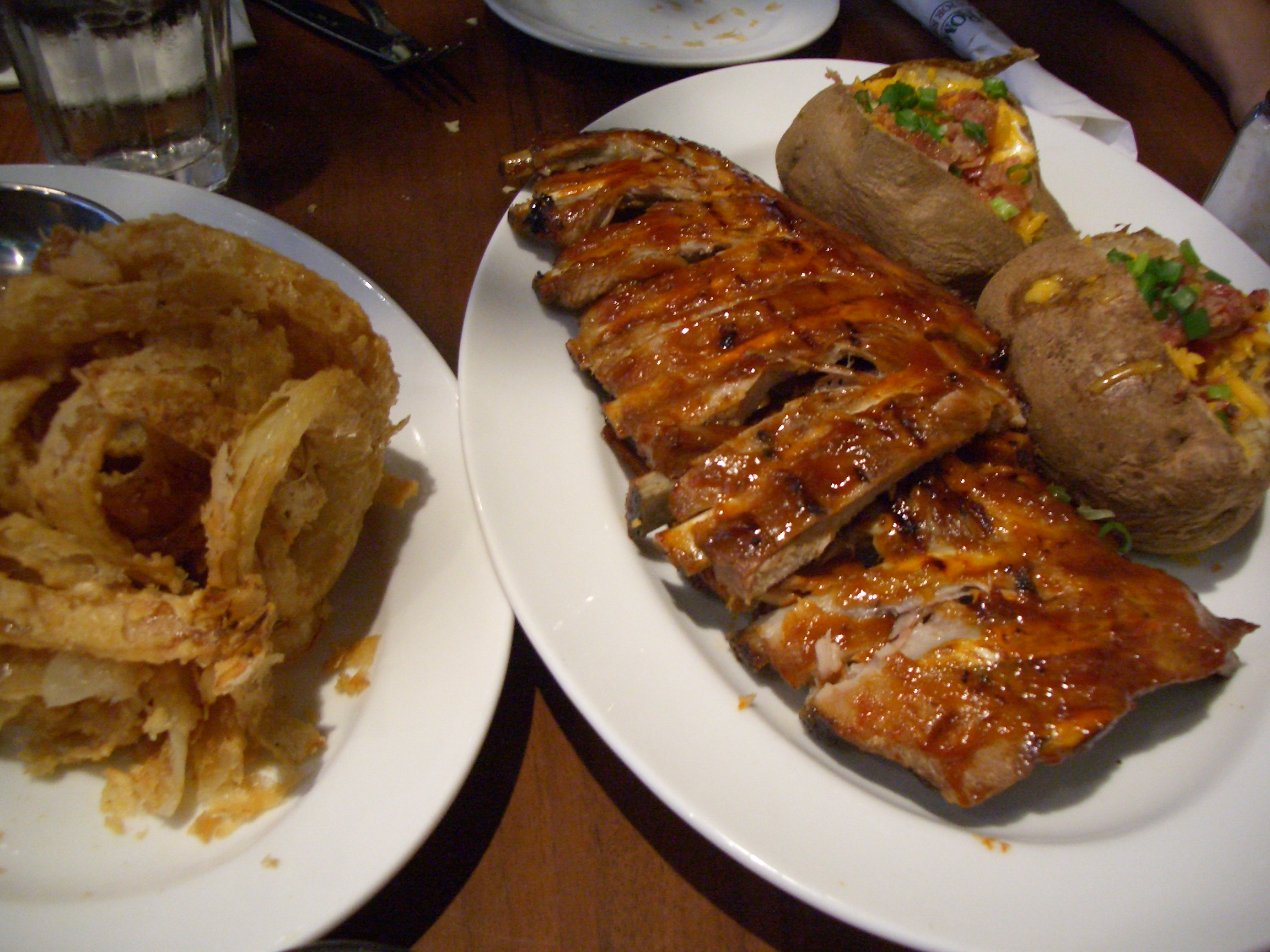
Baby-back ribs and onion loaf

When the first Tony Roma's opened in the 1970s, the restaurant was known for its burger and steaks until chef David Smith cooked up some baby back ribs and they became popular. Today the menu includes ribs, burgers, and steaks, as well as chicken and seafood dishes, appetizers, vegetarian dishes, desserts, and a cocktail list. Many international locations provide additional options that conform to local customs. Tony Roma's menu is routinely updated with specials, new chef-created dishes, and seasonal cuisines. In 2015, Roma Corp's introduced a new concept, TR Fire Grill & Lounge, in Orlando, Florida, featuring modern American cuisine and modern cocktails.

A number of entrees from the Tony Roma's menu are available as prepackaged frozen meals, sold in supermarkets. The entrees are manufactured and distributed by Rupari Food Services. Tony Roma's original barbecue sauce is also available in supermarkets.

== Locations ==
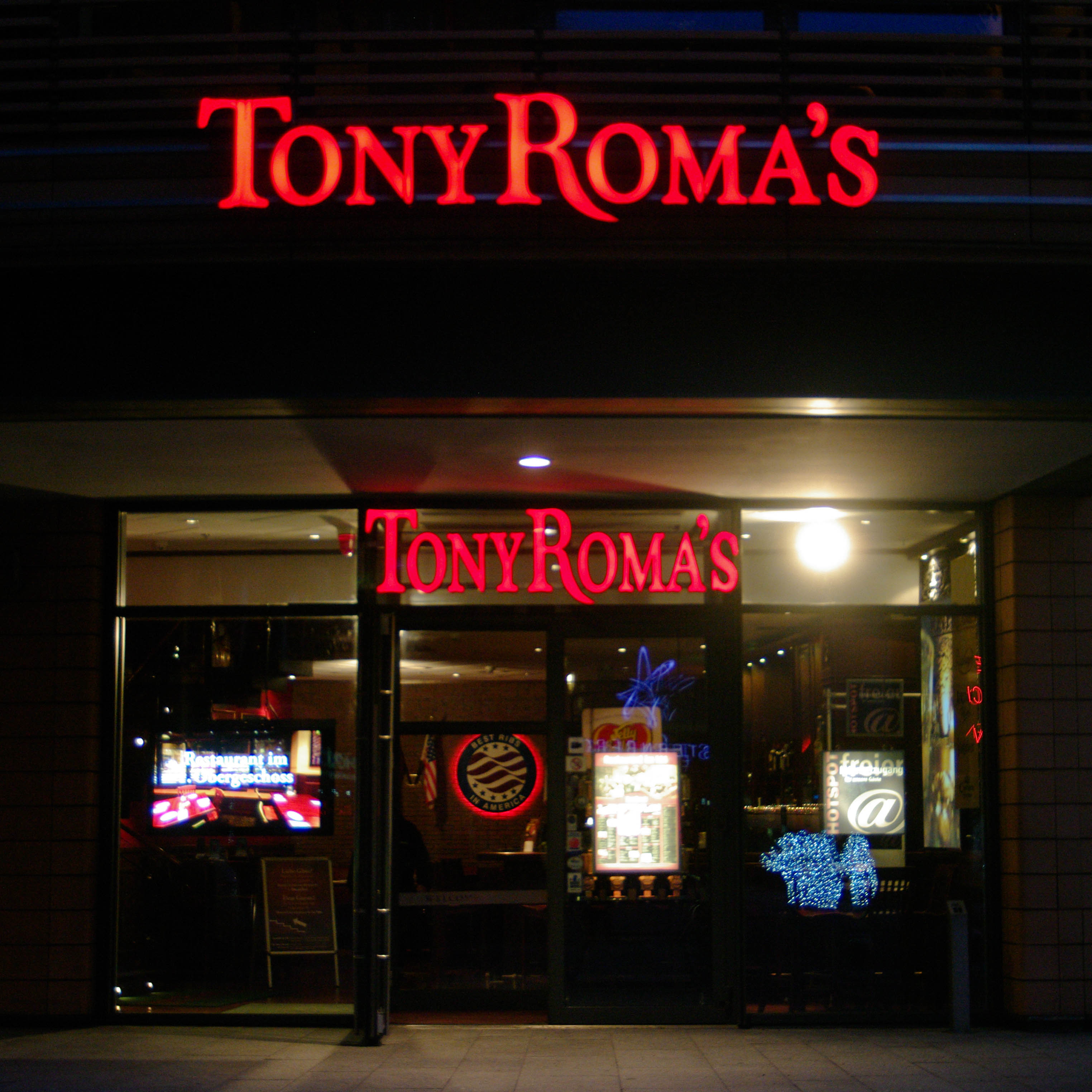
Tony Roma's in Berlin

As of 2020, the franchise has over 100 locations on six continents.

In 1976, Tony Roma's was one of the first US chain restaurants to expand into the international market, opening their first store in Japan. During the late 20th and early 21st centuries, Tony Roma's expanded into Europe, South America, Australia and Asia. Tony Roma's has also expanded to the Middle East, including the UAE. As of 2015, Tony Roma's had around 120 international stores spread across five continents, with 20 restaurants in the United States. The franchise introduced a brand makeover in 2016 with a new store model.

As of 2016, the only location near New York City was inside Newark Liberty International Airport, after the Commack branch closed as part of a downsizing. There also remained a location in Niagara Falls at the time. The closure left 20 locations in the United States, with most remaining restaurants international. In 2018, the company opened a location in South Palm Beach, Florida, its first US franchise in six years and its first new US restaurant since 2014.

As of 2020, there are two locations in Southern California. There is one near the SouthBay Pavilion in Carson, California, and another in Anaheim, California, near the Disneyland Resort.

Tony Roma's is consistently opening new restaurants in emerging markets. In 2015, Tony Roma's became one of the first US-based restaurants to open a store in Myanmar. As of 2018, Tony Roma's had "new licensing deals in the United States, Europe, Mexico, Australia and New Zealand" and "new development agreements in Spain, Nicaragua and Bolivia."

=== Countries and territories with restaurants ===
Countries with Tony Roma's restaurants

- Australia
- Bahrain
- Bangladesh
- Canada
- Chile
- Curaçao
- Dominican Republic
- El Salvador
- Germany
- Guatemala
- Indonesia
- Japan
- Malaysia
- Mexico
- Panama
- Peru
- Spain
- United Arab Emirates
- United States
- Venezuela

== See also ==
- List of barbecue restaurants
