= Max Hegele =

Austrian architect (1873–1945)

- Max Hegele with his project for the St. Charles Borromeo Church. (ca. 1900)
- Born: Maximilian Hegele; 25 May 1873; Vienna, Austria-Hungary
- Died: 12 March 1945 (aged 71); Vienna, Alpine and Danube Reichsgaue
- Education: Academy of Fine Arts Vienna
- Occupation: Architect
- Spouse: Wilhelmine Stelzer (m. 1908)
- Awards: Friedrich Schmidt Prize (1895)
- Buildings: St. Charles Borromeo Cemetery Church

Maximilian Hegele (25 May 1873 – 12 March 1945) was an Austrian architect, regarded as one of the leading exponents of Vienna's Secessionist architecture.

After practicing with established architects in Vienna, in 1899 Hegele debuted with a plan for the renovation of the city's Central Cemetery in which he applied the principles of Vienna Secession. His most famous work, the St. Charles Borromeo Cemetery Church, was developed within this project and is regarded as an example of Art Nouveau church. In the subsequent years he continued to work in Vienna and Lower Austria, sometimes incorporating historicist elements in his style. From the 1910s he concentrated mostly on residential buildings and in his later years he moved towards a simpler style.

A prolific architect, Hegele produced a great number of designs, among them: churches, museums, private houses, bridges and monuments; but many remained on paper.

== Life and career ==
=== Early life and education ===
Maximilian Hegele was born in Vienna on 12 March 1873, the son of Karl Hegele, a goldsmith, and Maria Hegele. From 1889 he studied at the State Trade School of Civil Engineering, where he attended the Building of Constructions course, graduating in 1893. He subsequently enrolled in Vienna's Academy of Fine Arts (Akademie der bildenden Künste Wien) where, between 1893 and 1896, he specialised in architecture under Victor Luntz and Karl von Hasenauer. After having successfully completed his studies there, as a gifted student he earned the prestigious "Prix de Rome", a scholarship that allowed him to study for a year in Italy.

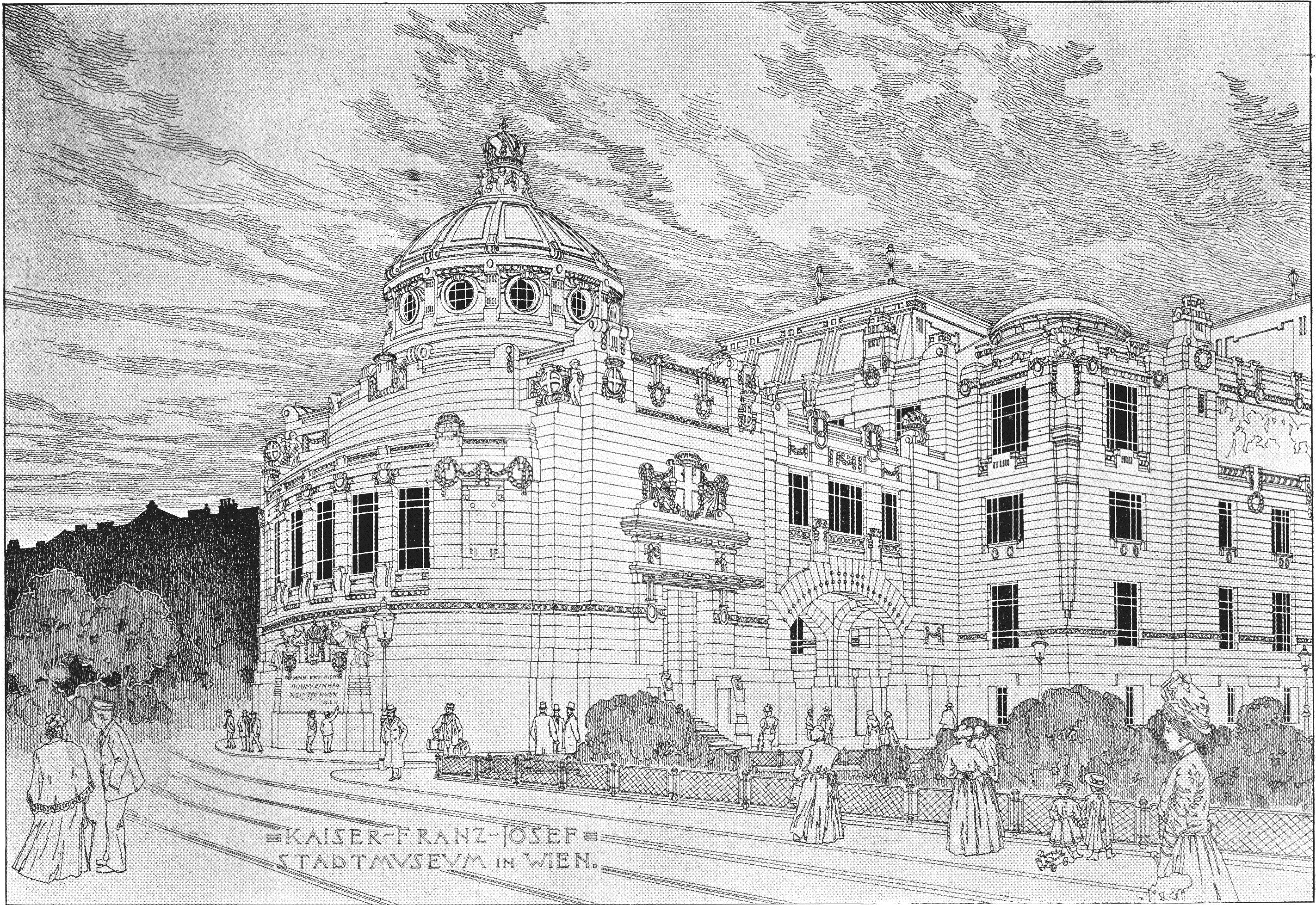
In his early projects like this (Kaiser Franz Joseph City Museum, ca. 1901), Hegele was inspired by Wagner's work.

Back in Vienna, the following year he practiced with several architectural firms, among them Franz von Neumann, a prominent historicist, and the brothers Anton and Josef Drexler, who at the time were moving from historicism towards Secessionstil. In 1899 he became member of the architects association "Wiener Bauhütte" and participated at the competition for redesigning Vienna's Central Cemetery. In 1900 he was announced as the winner of the first prize and, after having revised and adapted his plans, he received the opportunity bring his project to life. Among the jury members sat Otto Wagner, one of the pioneers of Viennese Art Nouveau architecture, whose work had played a great influence on the young Hegele.

=== Vienna's Central Cemetery (1903–1911) ===
==== The cemetery halls ====
The commission for the Central Cemetery's redevelopment was a turning point in Hegele's life and career. The plan consisted of a monumental entrance, two funerary halls and the central church, all designed in the Secession style. Work lasted from 1903 to 1911 and proceeded in stages. The first buildings to be finished were the two funerary pavilions (Aufbahrungshallen) on both sides of the Cemetery path, which were completed in 1905. The pavilion 1 today is still used for ceremonies, while the pavilion 2 now hosts the Funerary Museum (Bestattungsmuseum) The two halls show similarities as both are shallow buildings, with a central tower covered by a pyramidal copper roof. They are white on the exterior with geometric decorations. Each entrance is surmounted by anornamental arch with a clock placed at its center. The main hall of the first pavilion is lavishly decorated, with metallic chandeliers and matching sconces on the walls. A huge mosaic behind the altar stands out from the white interiors.

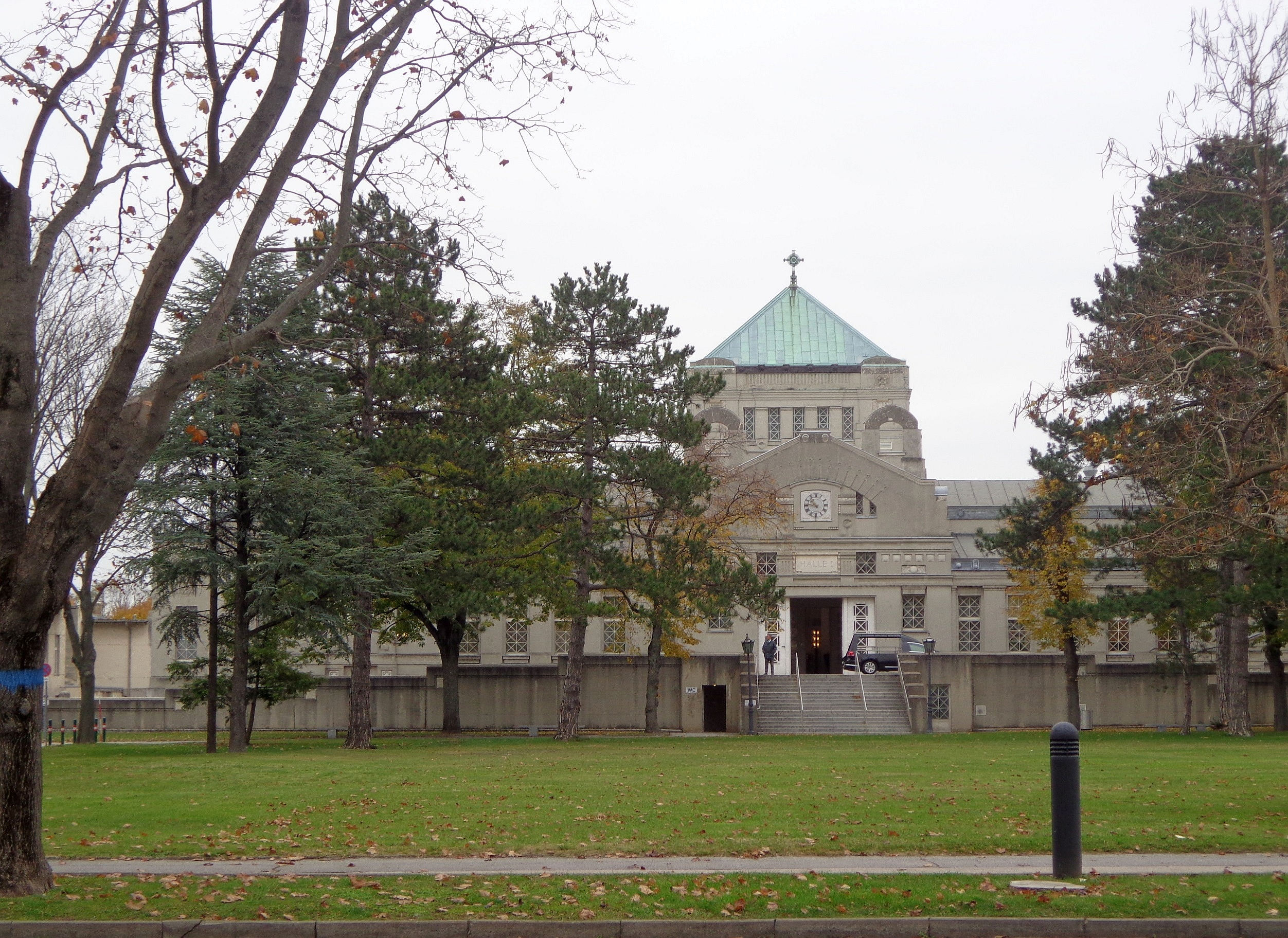
The pavilion 1, front view.

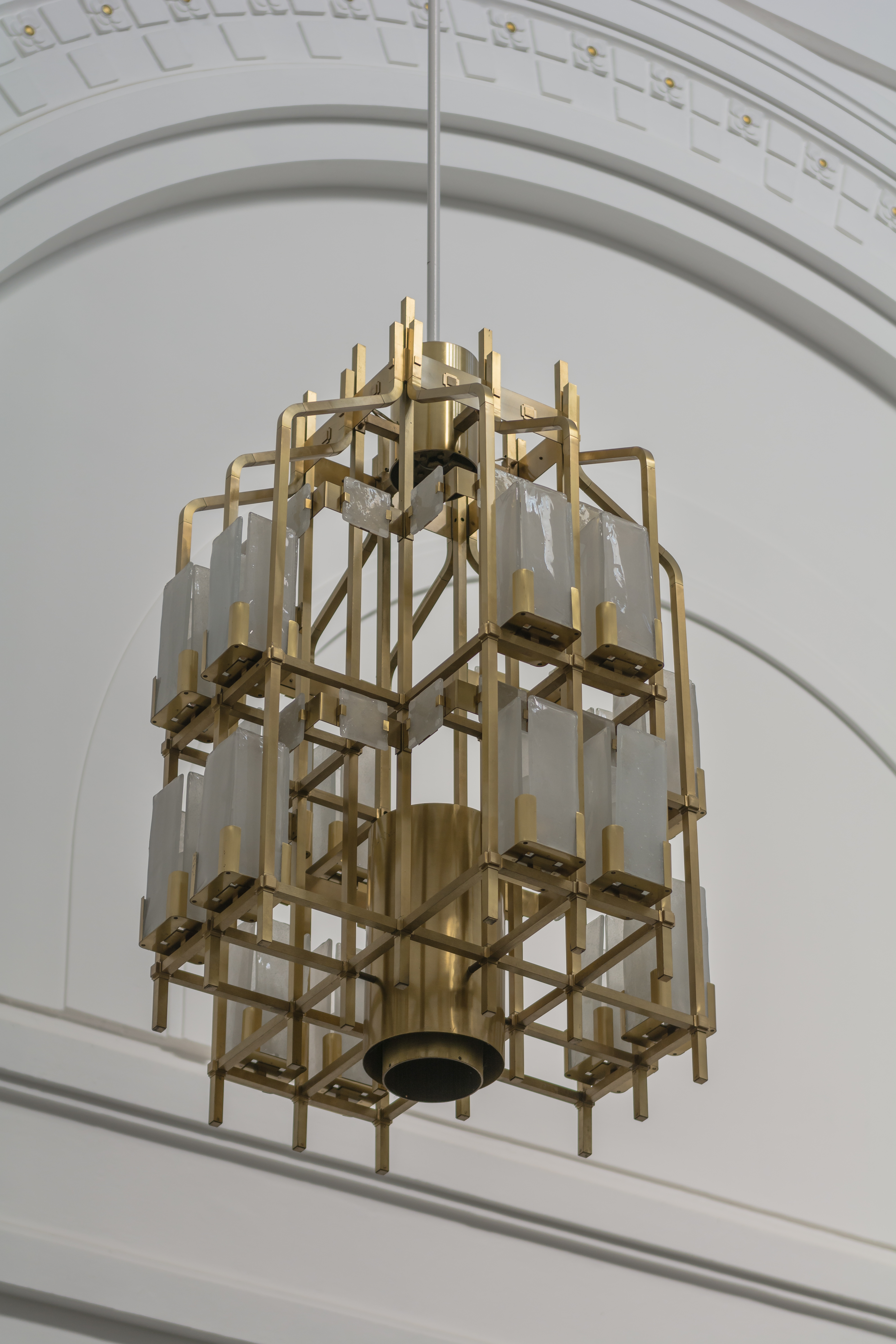
Secessionist chandelier in the first pavilion.

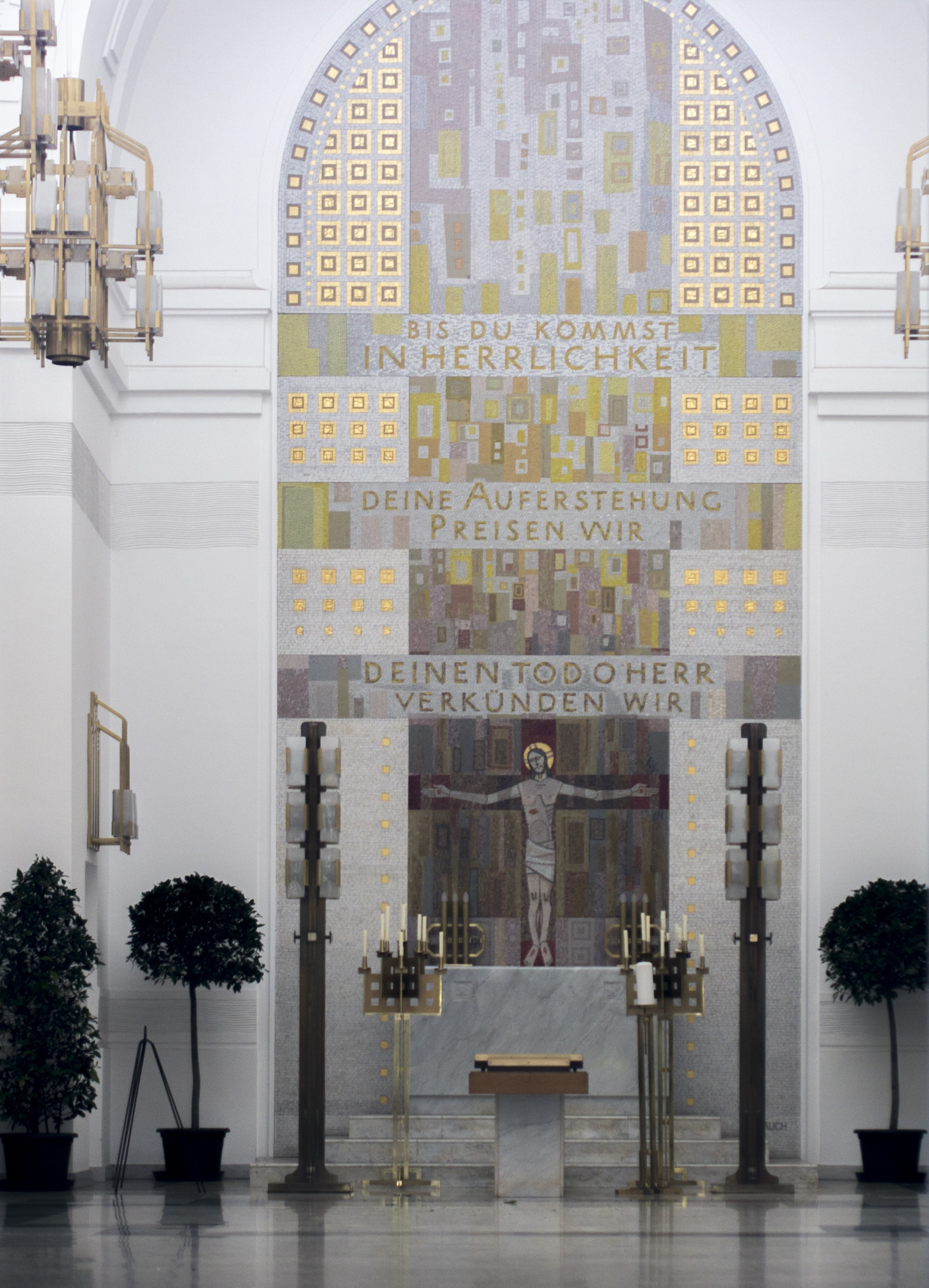
The pavilion 1, interior.

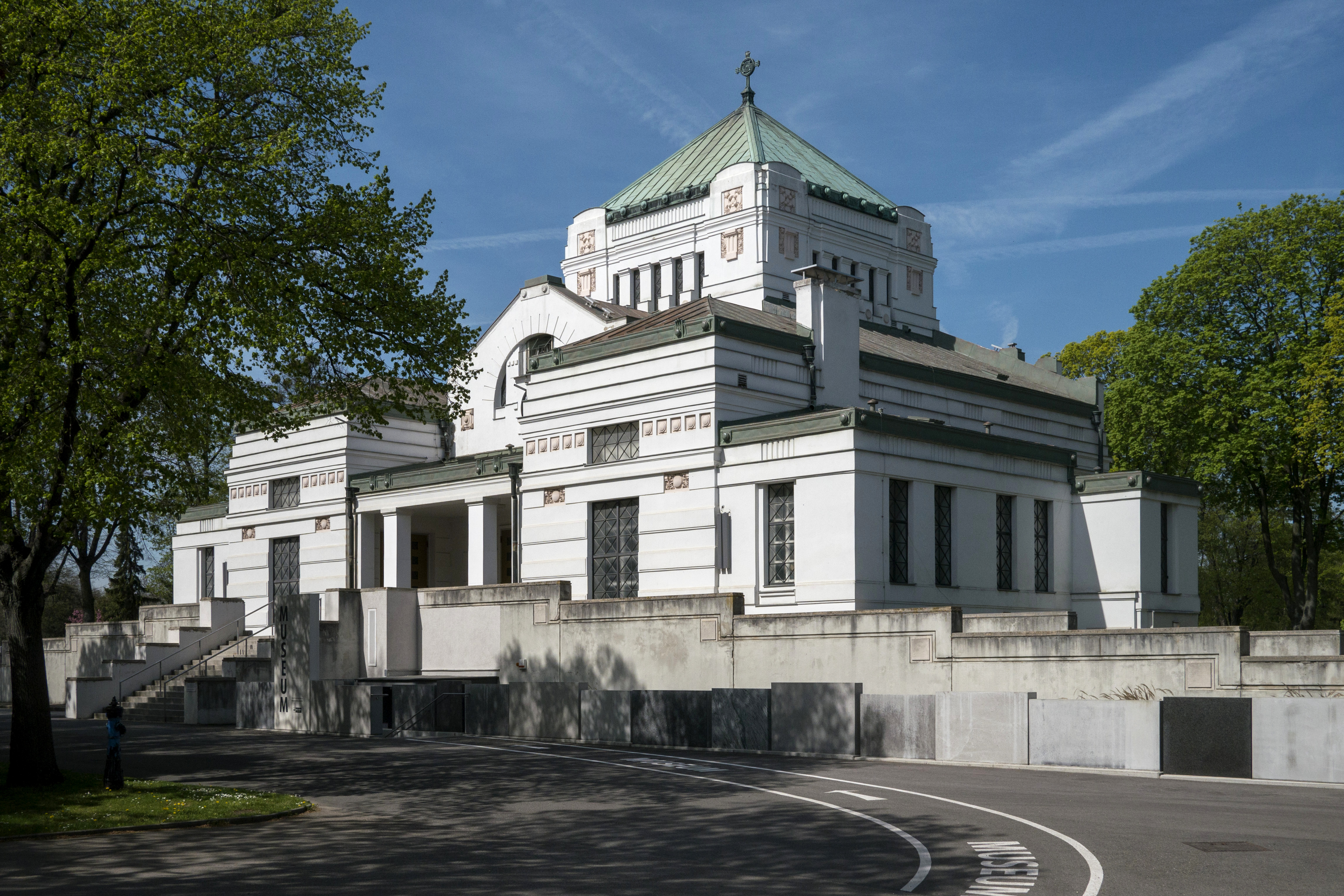
The pavilion 2, today occupied by the Bestattungsmuseum.

==== The cemetery gate ====
Next came the main entrance or 2nd Gate (2° Tor), built in 1905‒1906. It stands out for its high secessionist obelisks; at the base of each, facing the street, is a couple of statues holding Vienna's coat of arms. Each figure has a funerary symbol in its hand: a skull, meaning death, an hourglass, for time passing, a laurel wreath, symbolising immortality, and a palm branch, representing resurrection. On both sides of the gate is placed a relief: the one on the left (Christ receives the Dead) was realised by Georg Leisek, the other one on the right (People at the Gate for a Place of no Return) is the work of Carl Anselm Zinsler. At the back of the obelisks are two inscriptions reading "Erected during the reign of Franz Josef" and "Built under mayor Karl Lueger". The already existing administrative buildings on each side of the gate were also remodeled to harmonize with its style.

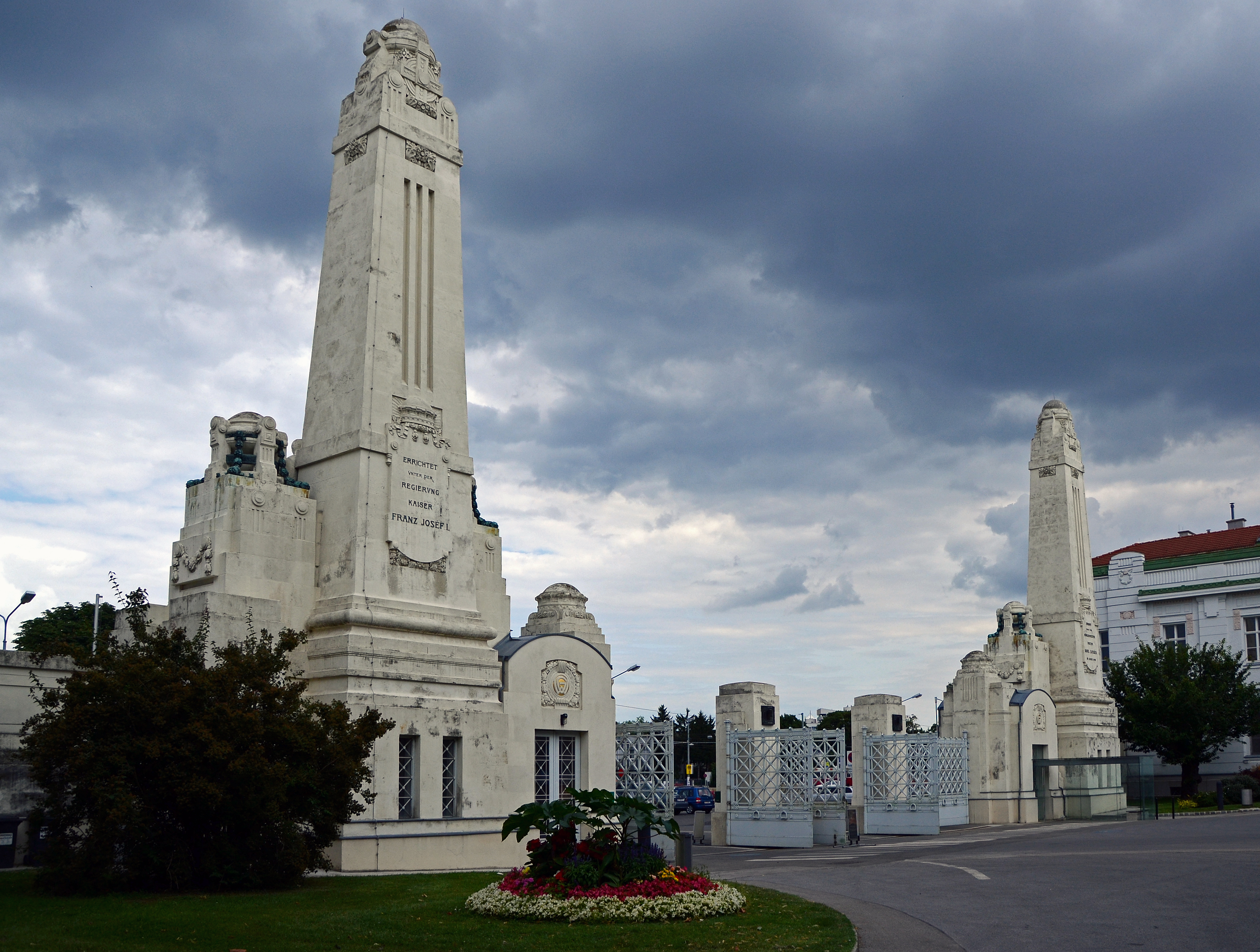
The 2nd gate, seen from inside.

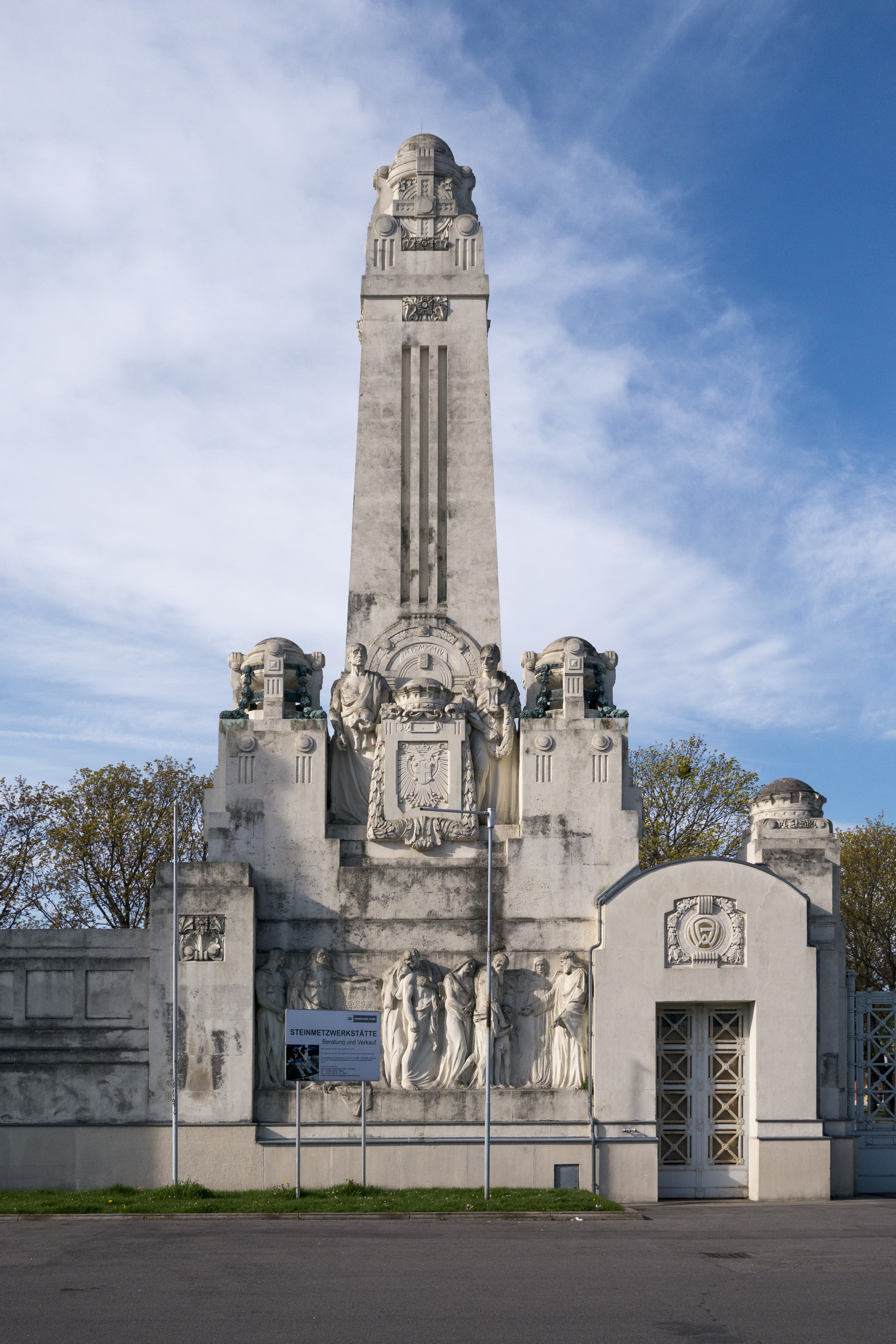
The obelisks on the left, from the street side.

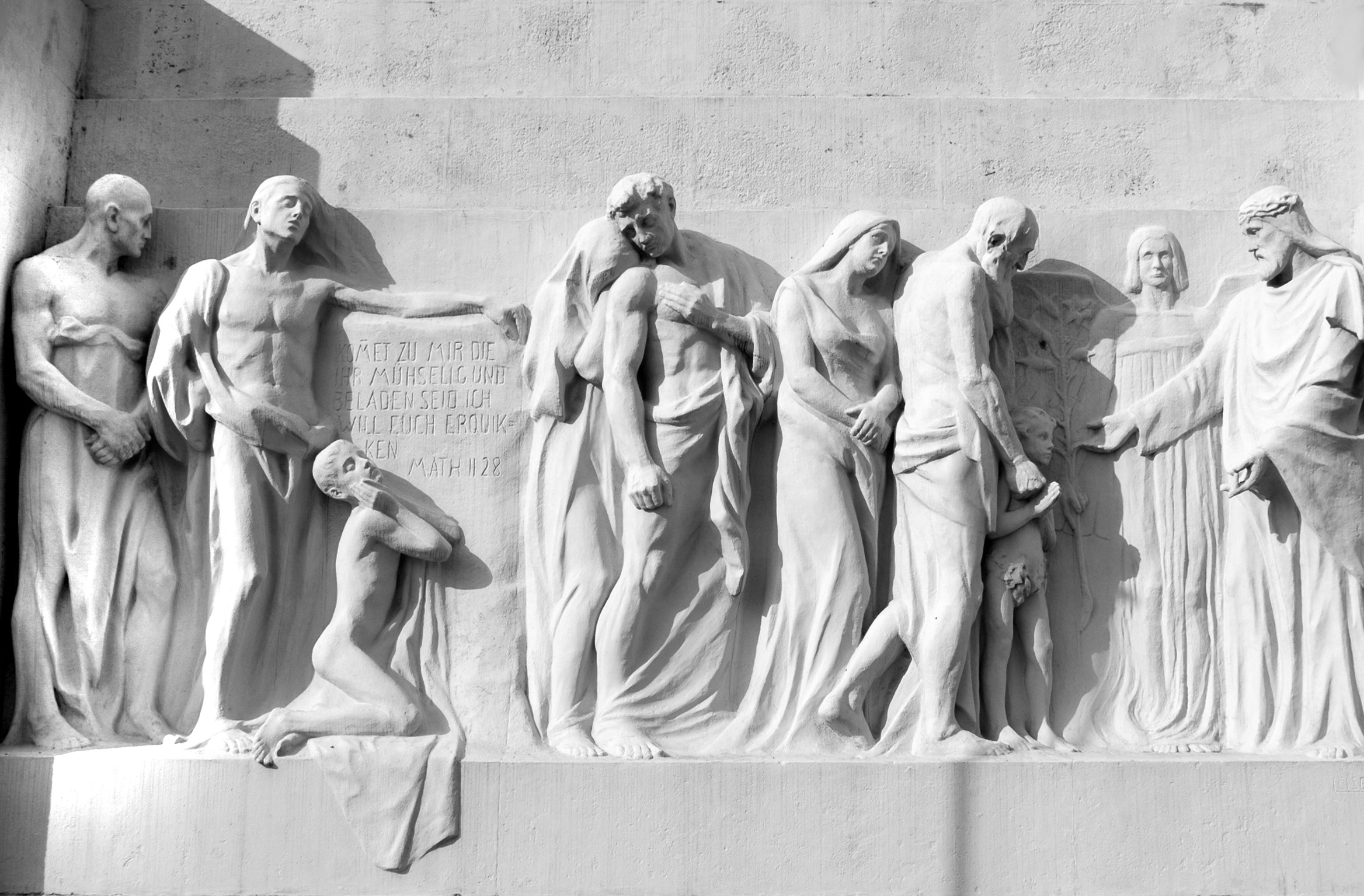
Leisek's Christ receives the Dead (left).

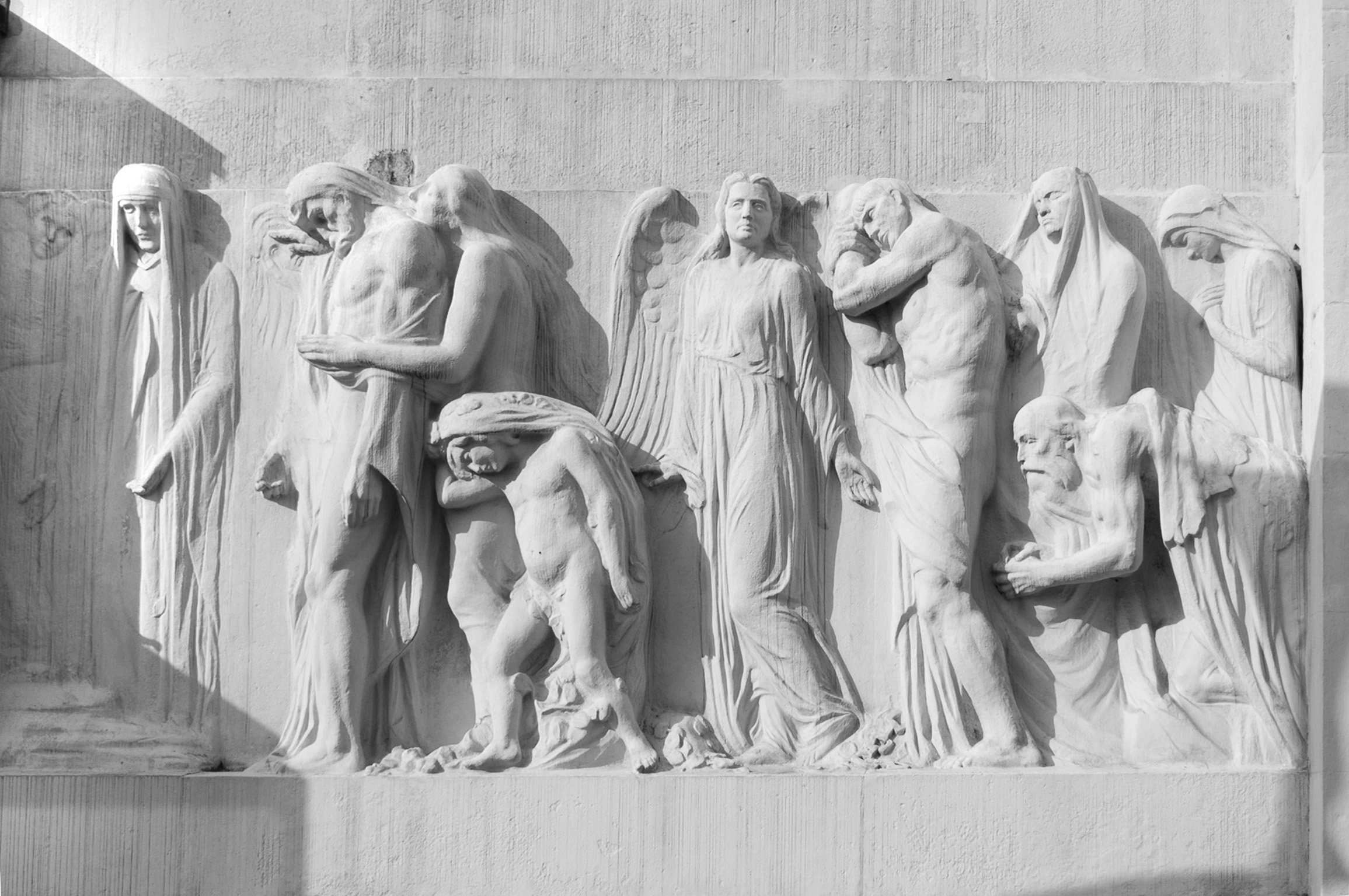
Zinsler's People at the Gate for a Place of no Return (right).

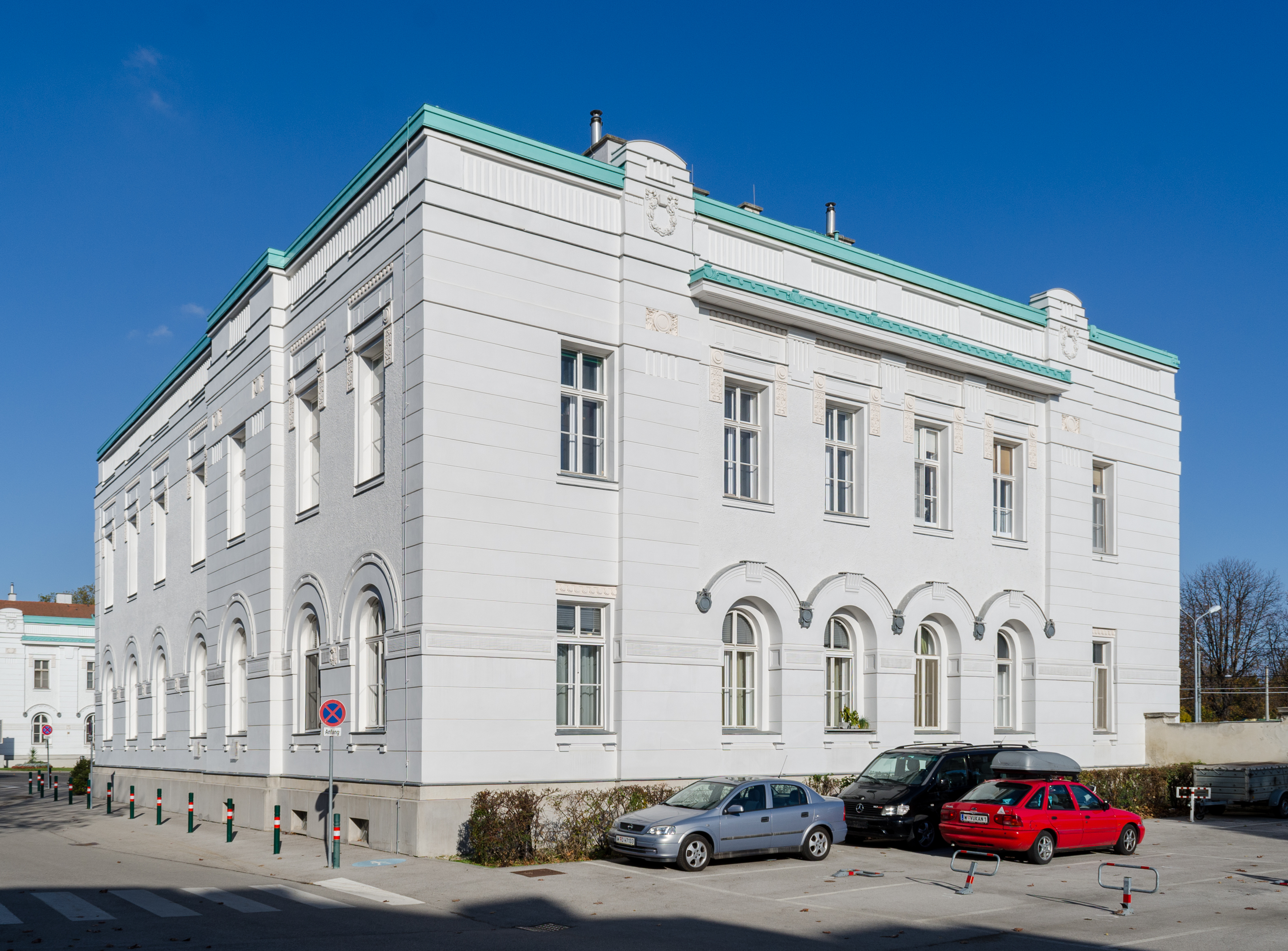
Administrative building restyled by Hegele (left).

==== The central Cemetery Church ====
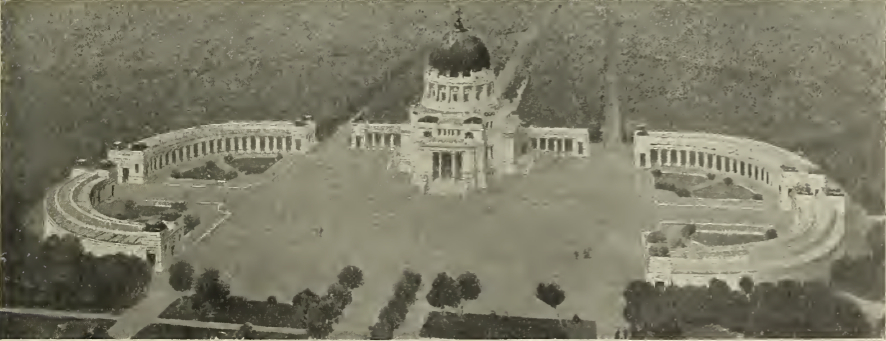
Hegele's original project. The two colonnades opposing the church were removed from the final design.

The St. Charles Borromeo Cemetery Church (Friedhofskirche zum heiligen Karl Borromäus) is considered to be Max Hegele's masterpiece and it is probably the most renowned work by him. It is regarded as well as one of the best examples of Secessionist Church, along with Wagner's St. Leopold Church. Hegele's project for the church was already well defined in 1899, though it needed some improvement, but construction did not start until eight years later. Groundbreaking took place on 11 May 1908, with Vienna's Mayor Karl Lueger laying the first stone, and the building was ultimated in October 1910, opening the following year. Lueger, who had died in the meantime, was buried in the crypt; for this reason the church is sometimes referred to as "Dr. Karl Lueger's Memorial Church" (Luegerkirche). The church is an imposing building, reaching the height of 58.5 meters and occupying an area of 2231 square meters. Hegele was probably influenced by the historical architecture of Vienna since he chose an elliptical plan, typical of the city's baroque churches, and the structure is reminiscent of the Karlskirche (also dedicated to St. Charles Borromeo). The exterior is painted white and richly decorated with geometric patterns. Two towers topped with a pyramidal roof flank the entrance while two higher belltowers are placed at the back of the church. An impressive copper dome (its diameter being of 22.7 meters for a height of 39) dominates the whole structure. Hegele designed the interiors as well, collaborating with several decorative artists: sculptors Georg Leisek and Hans Rathausky provided reliefs for the lobby, stained glass windows and mosaics were created by Leopold Forstner and artworks by Anton Kaan, Franz Klug, Karl Philipp and Adolf Pohl enrich the main altar; a Last Judgement was painted by Hans Zatzka in the lunette above it. Lamps, chandeliers, and wall ornaments are notable examples of secessionist metalwork. The ceiling of the dome is painted blue, dotted with golgen stars and with stylized rays all around the oculus.

Two curving colonnades embrace the square in front of the entrance, visually extending the wings of arcades on both sides of the church. Those colonnades, erected between 1906 and 1907, host a columbarium and other graves.

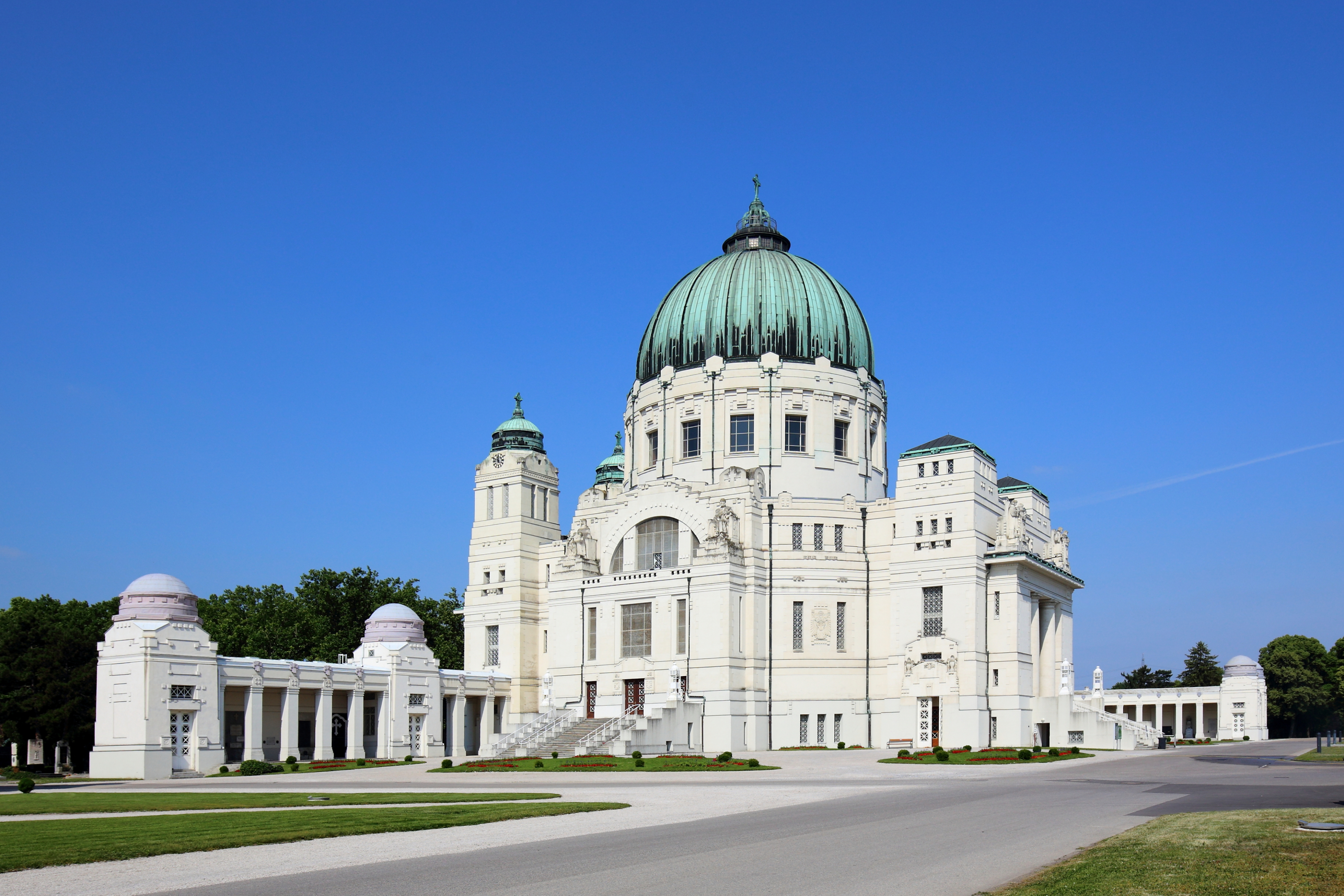
The St. Charles Borromeo Church (east side). On the foreground is the right wing, on the background the left colonnade can be seen.

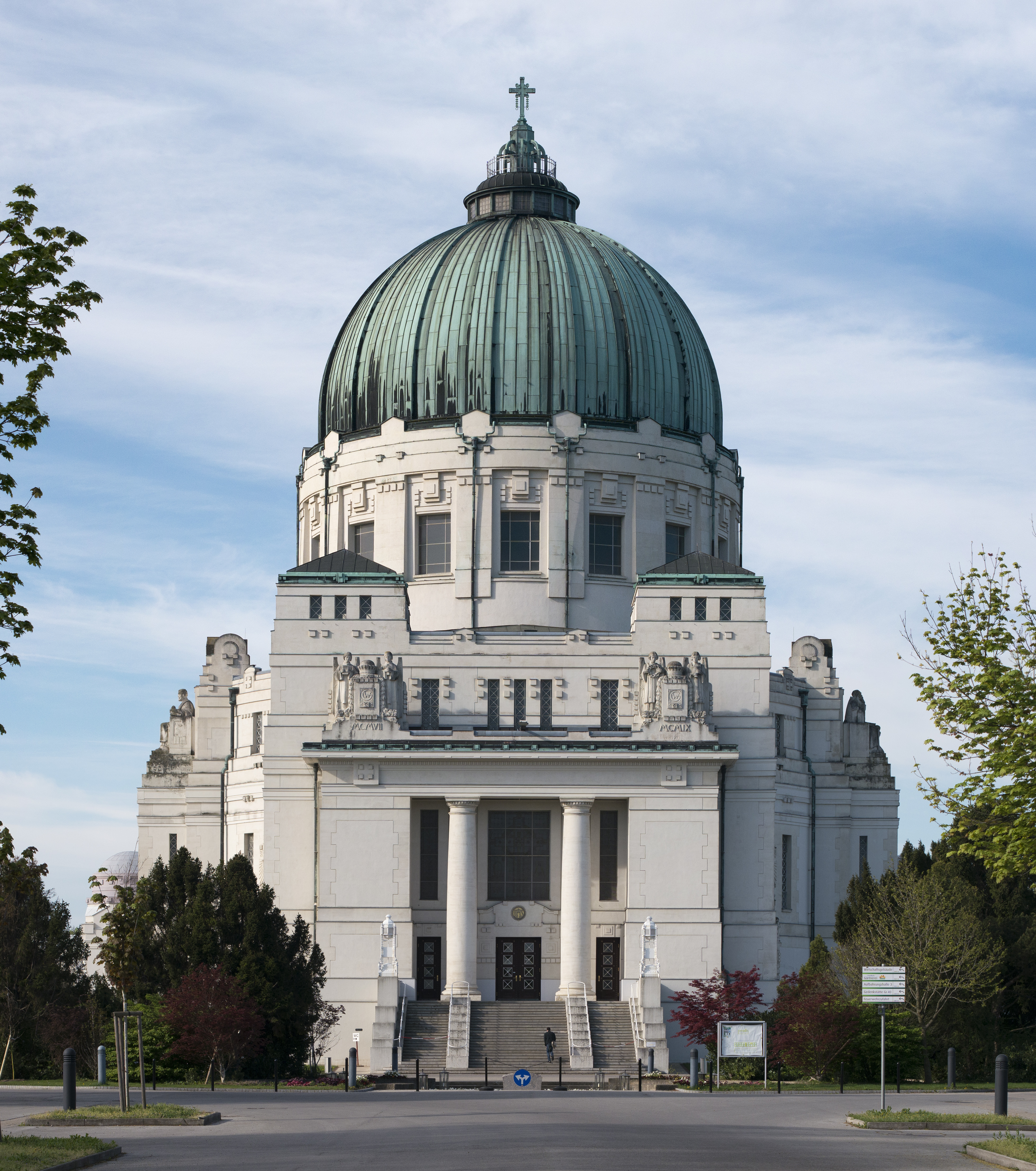
The church, front view.

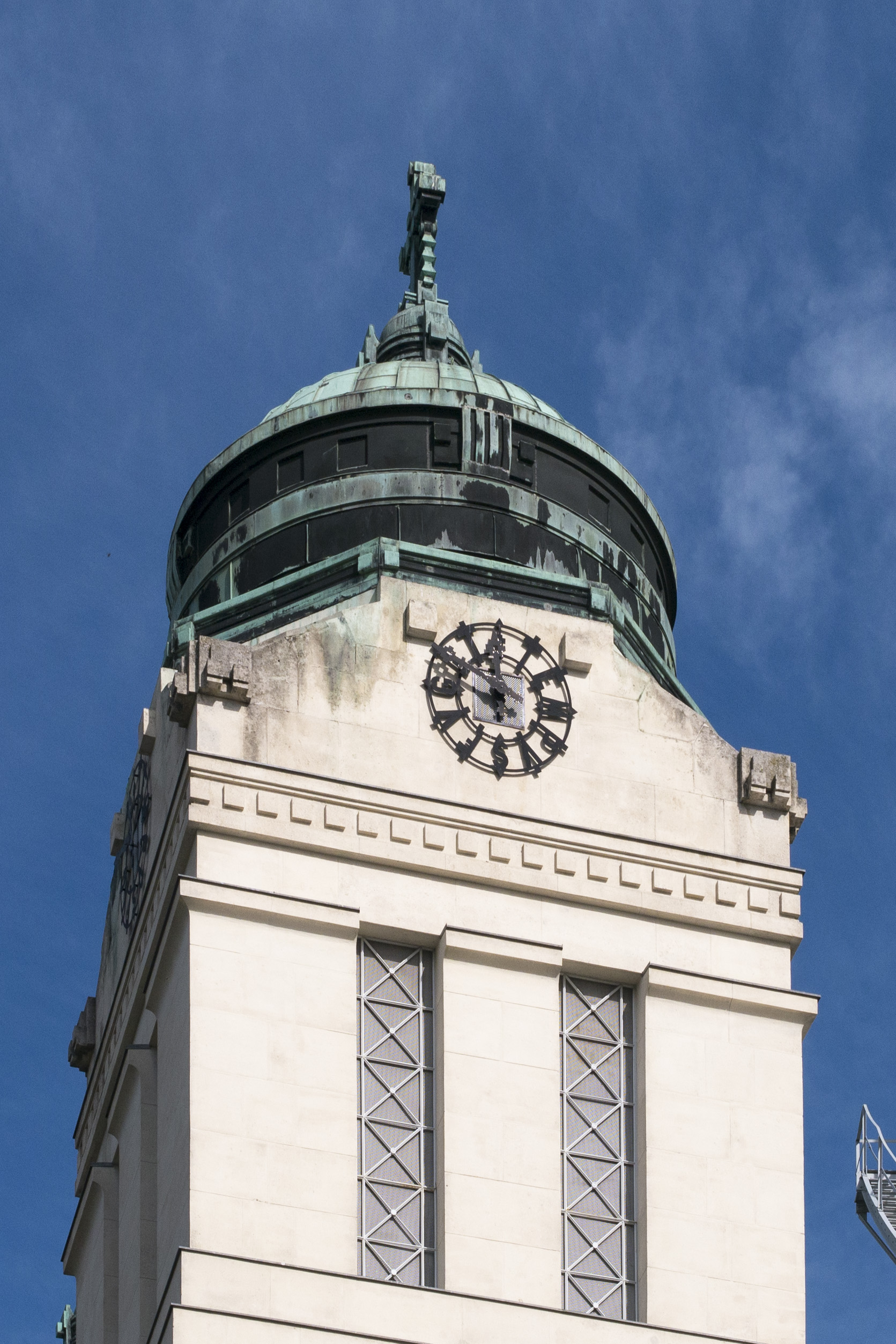
Belltower. Clock numbers are replaced by letters, reading "tempus fugit" (Latin: time flies).

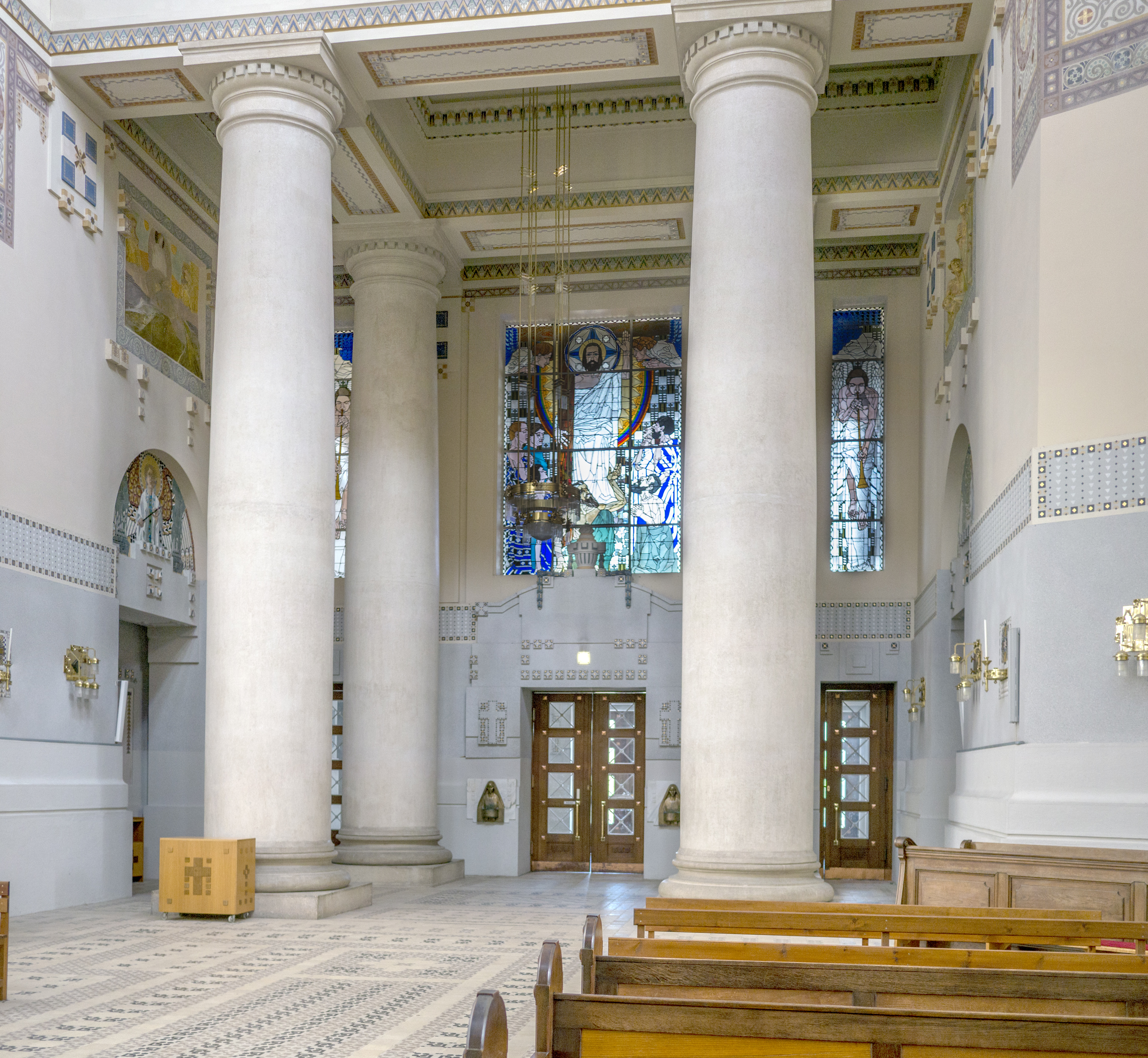
The church lobby, with chandelier, mosaics and stained glass window.

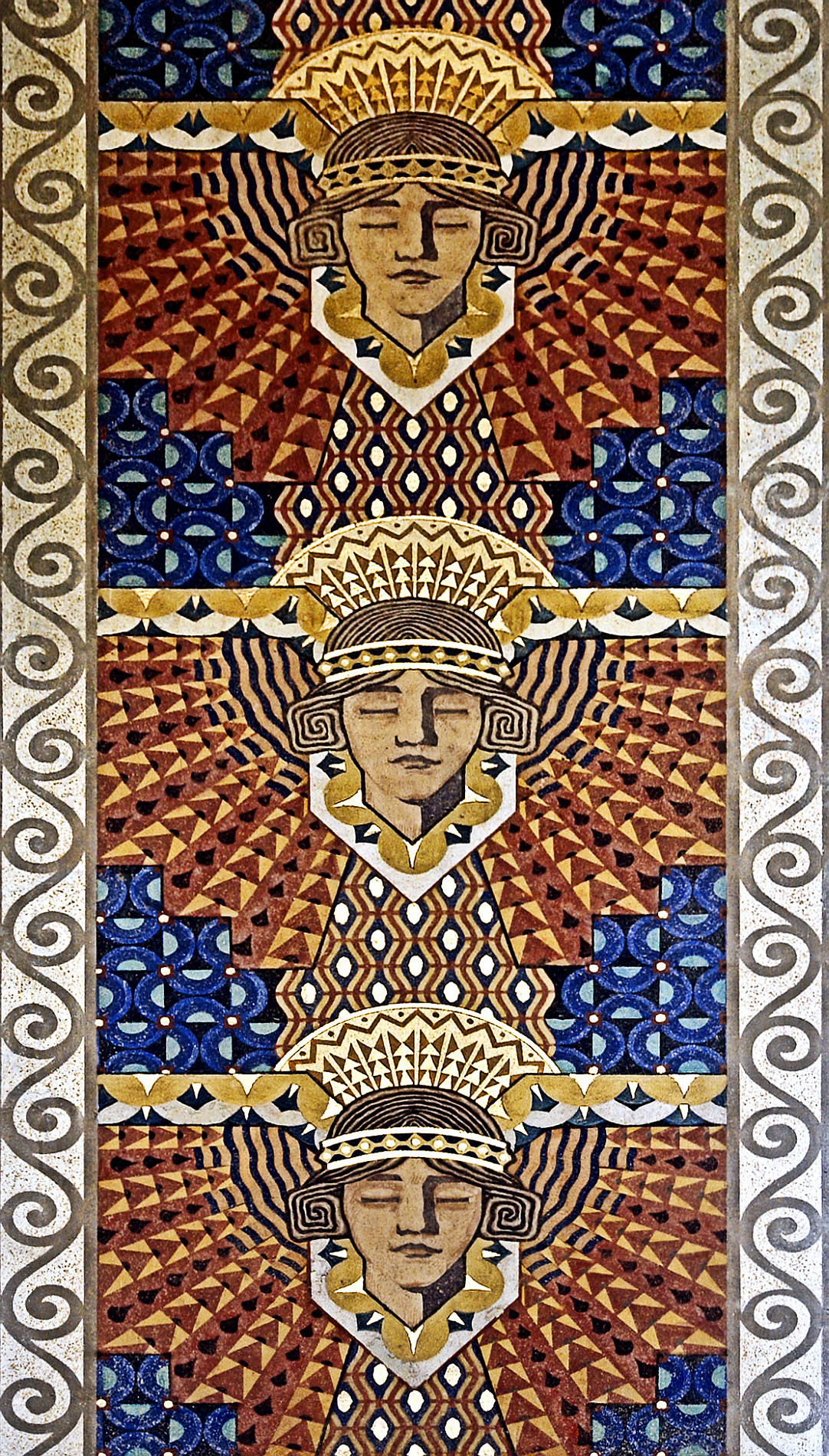
Decorative pattern of the columns.

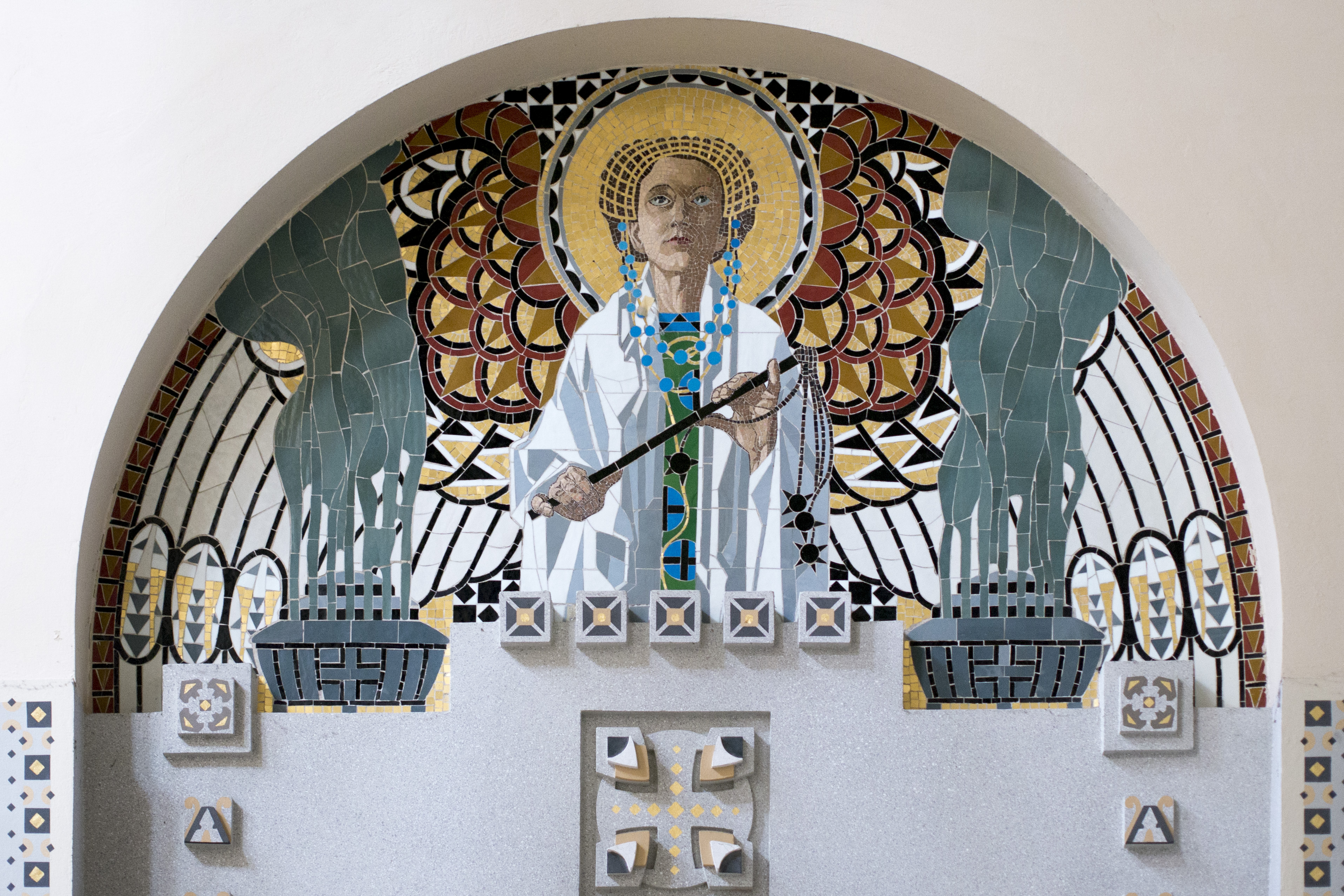
Lunette with mosaic representing suffering.

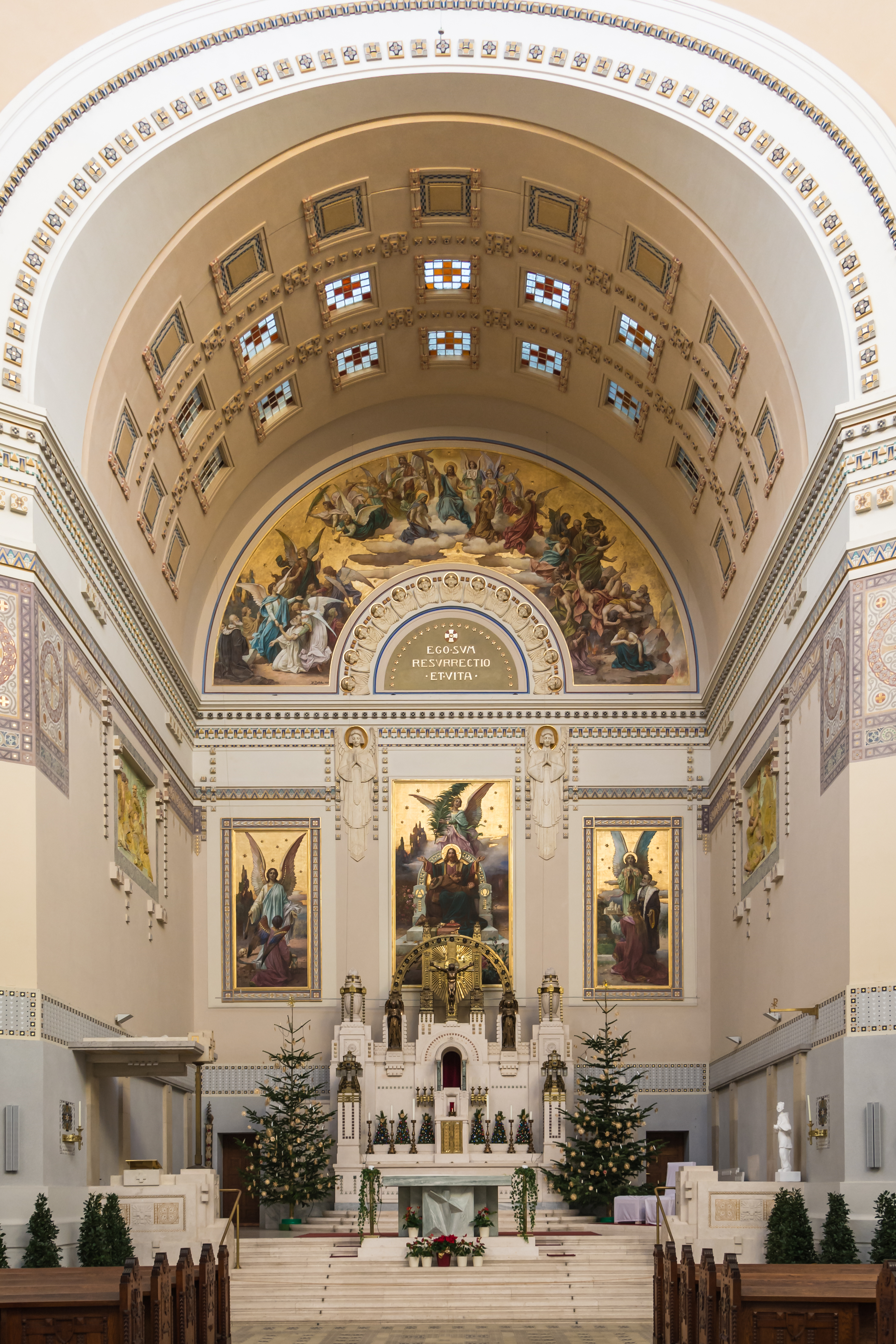
Main altar.

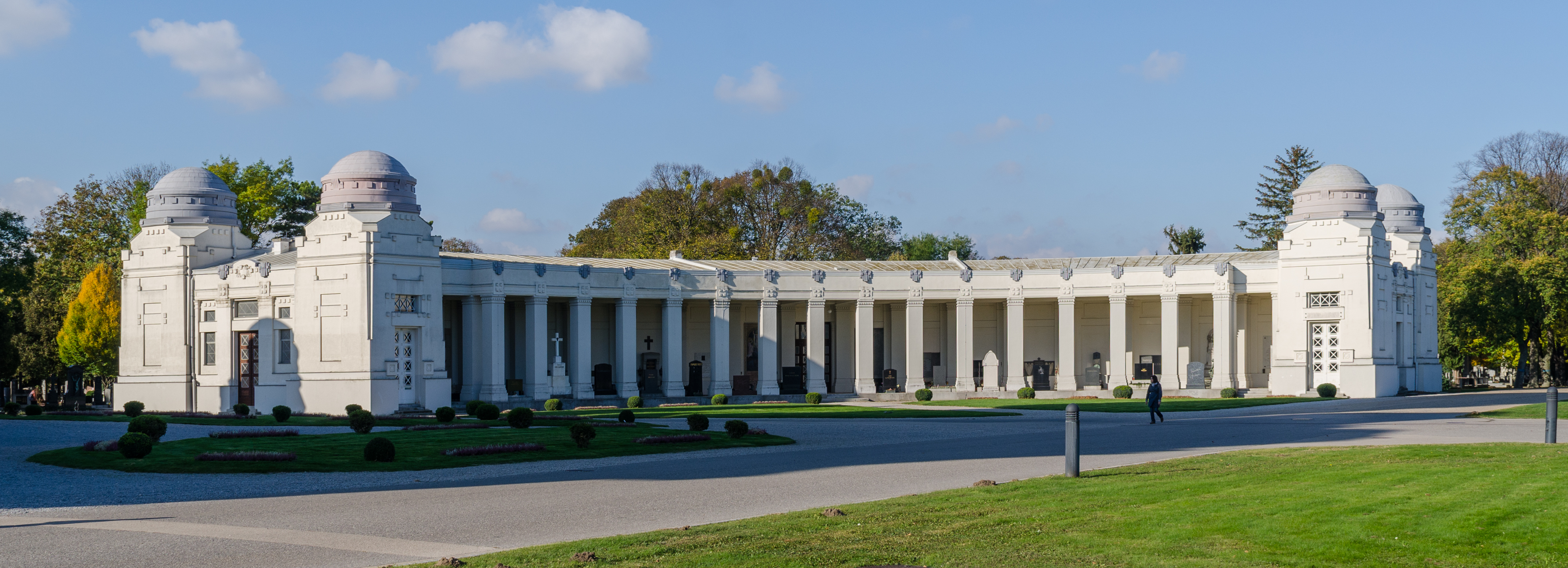
Colonnade on the right, with columbarium and tombstones.

=== The Parish Church of Pressbaum (1906–1908) ===
Hegele's project for Vienna's Cemetery took eight years to be completed and in the meantime he produced several other designs; among them is that for the Parish Church of Pressbaum (Pfarrkirche Pressbaum), the only known example of secessionist church in Lower Austria. The building was meant to replace the old baroque church of Pressbaum and Max Hegele and his assistant August Rehak were appointed to ideate it. After an initial neo-baroque design, they came up with the definitive concept. Construction started in 1906 (Franz Josef attended the laying of the first stone) and ended in 1908, when the church was dedicated as the Kaiser Franz Josef Jubilee Church, in occasion of the Emperors 60th year of reign. The structure is a remarkable example of secessionist architecture blended with Austrian traditional architecture. The layout is substantially traditional, with a longitudinal nave and a high steeple on the left of the facade, but Hegele's Secessionstil emerges in multiple aspects: the metallic geometric ornamentation that appears both inside and outside, the disposition of elements on the facade, the Art Nouveau furniture (wooden pews, confessionals and wrought iron chandeliers) and the way the tower adjoins its pointed roof, recalling Hegele's previous creations. Medieval and neo-Gothic features are also present such as pointed arches and neo-medieval stained glass windows.

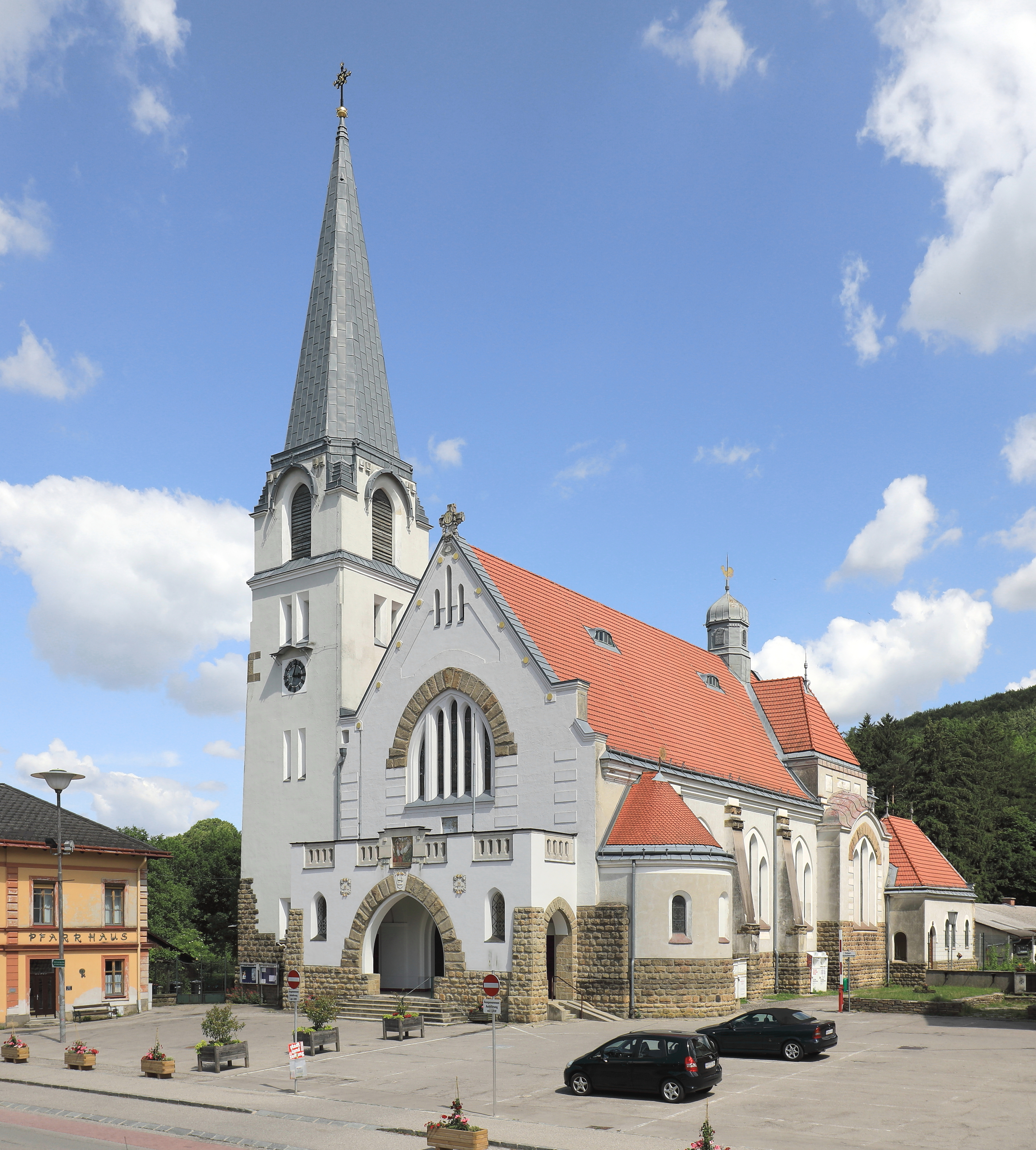
The Parish Church of Pressbaum.

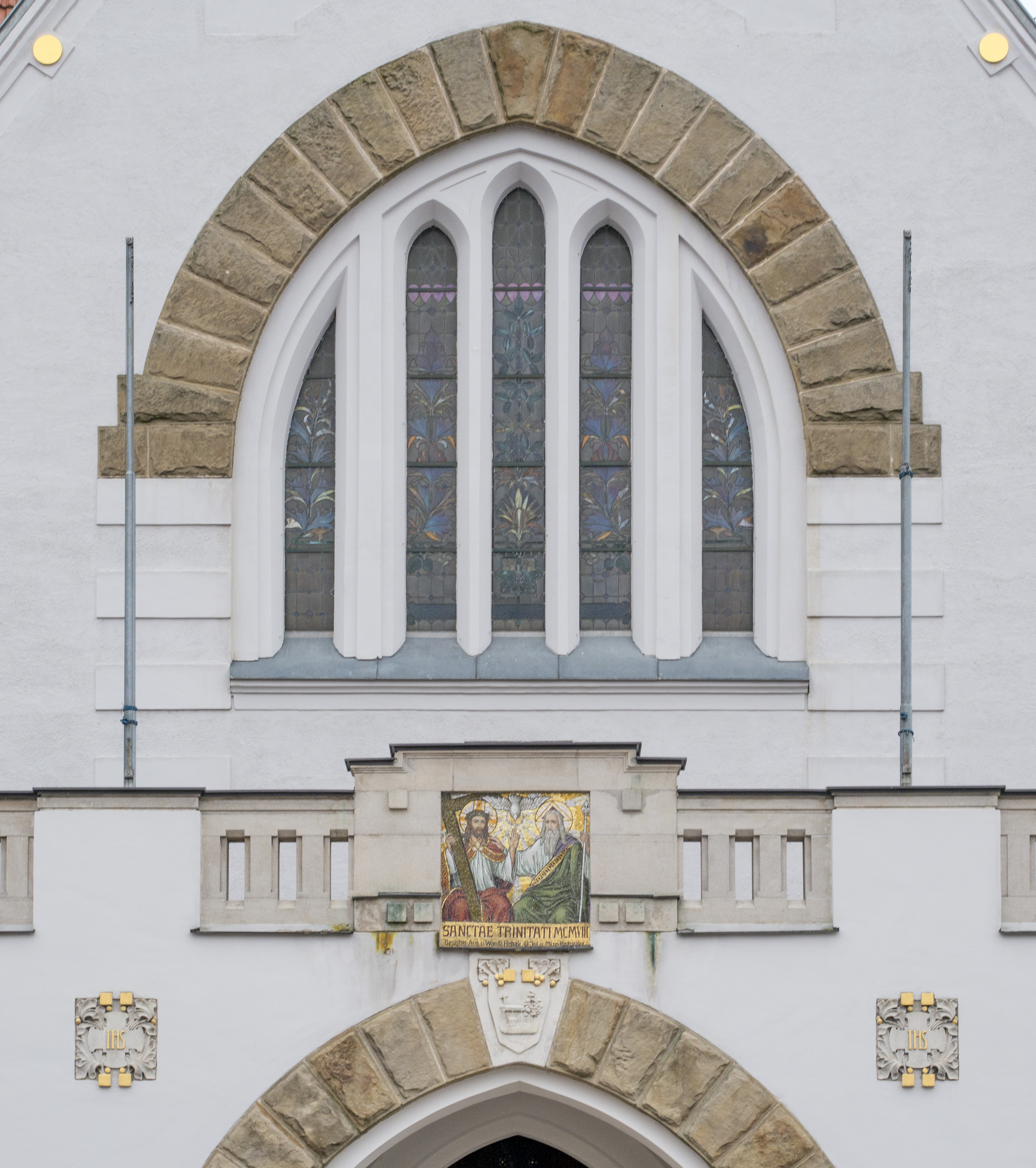
Detail of the facade: gothic and secessionist elements coexist.

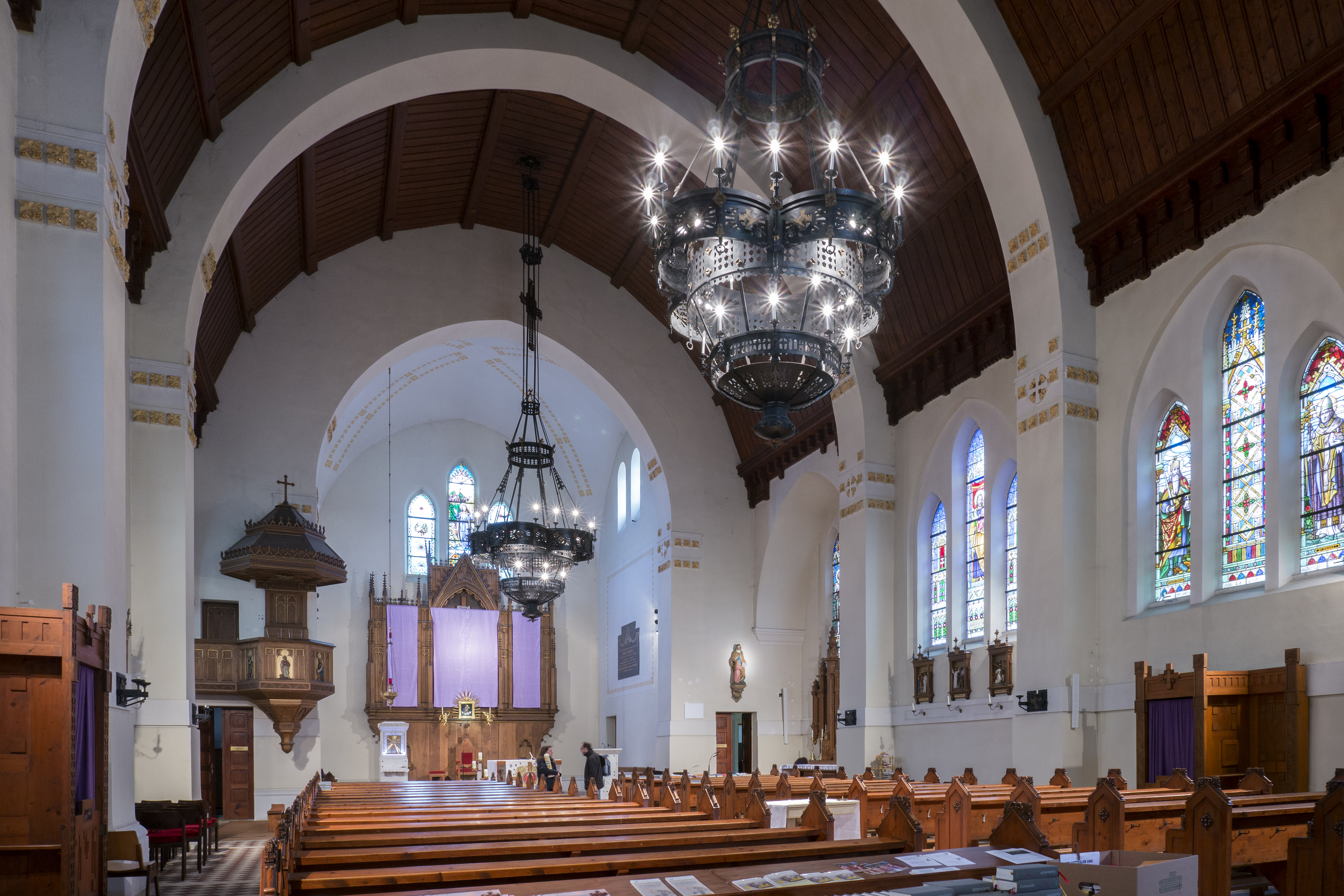
Interior, note the secessionist furniture and metallic wall ornaments.

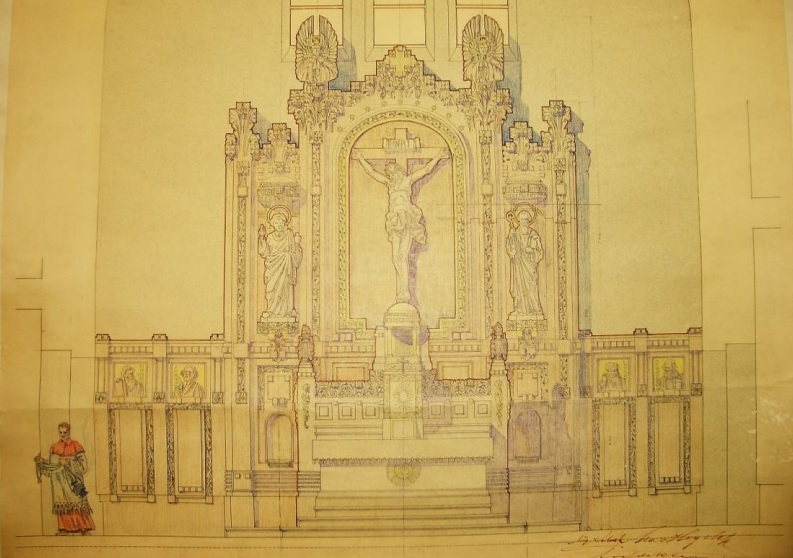
Project for the church's altarpiece.

=== The Hadersdorf-Weidlingau Cemetery Chapel (1908–1909) ===
The year 1908 was a crucial one for Hegele's career: now a member of the Central Association of Austrian Architects, he presided over the Wiener Bauhütte's Exhibition Committee of Architects, joined the Austrian Society for Christian Art and was appointed professor of structural engineering at the State Trade School of Vienna, his alma mater, a position he would keep for many years.

In 1907 the municipal committee of Hadersdorf-Weidlingau decided to have a chapel for services built in the town cemetery. The chapel had to be funded by private donations and the then mayor Eduard Herzmansky contributed a significant sum for it. A special committee was formed and Max Hegele was selected to design the new building. Work started in 1908 and ended the following year, with the chapel being opened on 31 October 1909. Like in previous occasions, Hegele applied the Secessionstil principles to the building, combining architecture with applied arts. The chapel is cross-shaped, white on the outside, with a copper gable roof culminating in a belltower. A wide semicircular window characterizes the facade. External ornamentation is purely geometric, except for an elaborate crucifix at the top of the back wall. Murals with stylised angels and friezes of vegetal motifs embellish the interiors, while stained glass windows contribute to the lighting. Two family tombs are hosted within the chapel: the one of Eduard Herzmansky, again designed by Hegele in 1909‒1910, and the one of Jean Herzmansky, created by sculptor Theodor Khuen in 1912.

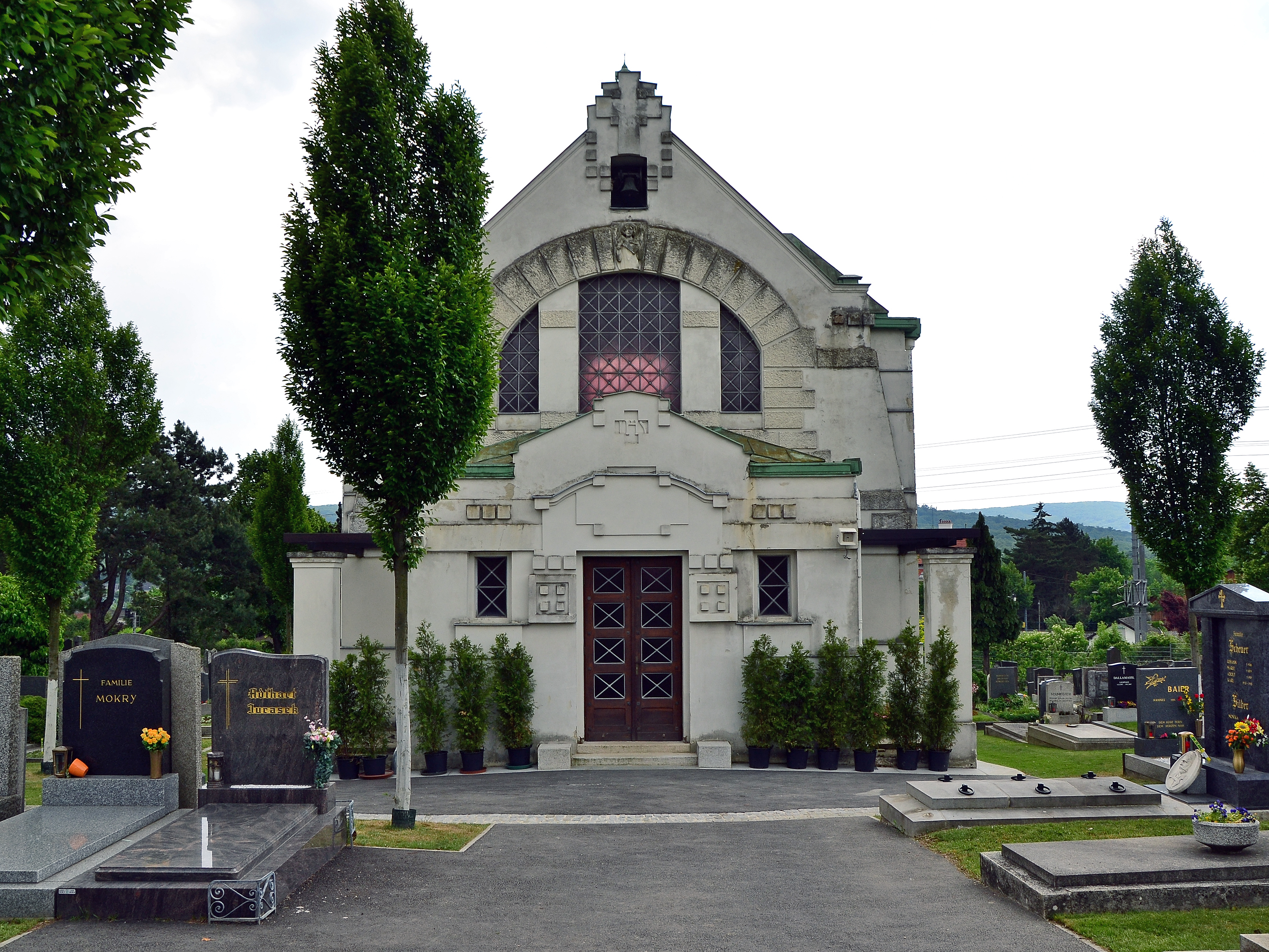
Front view.

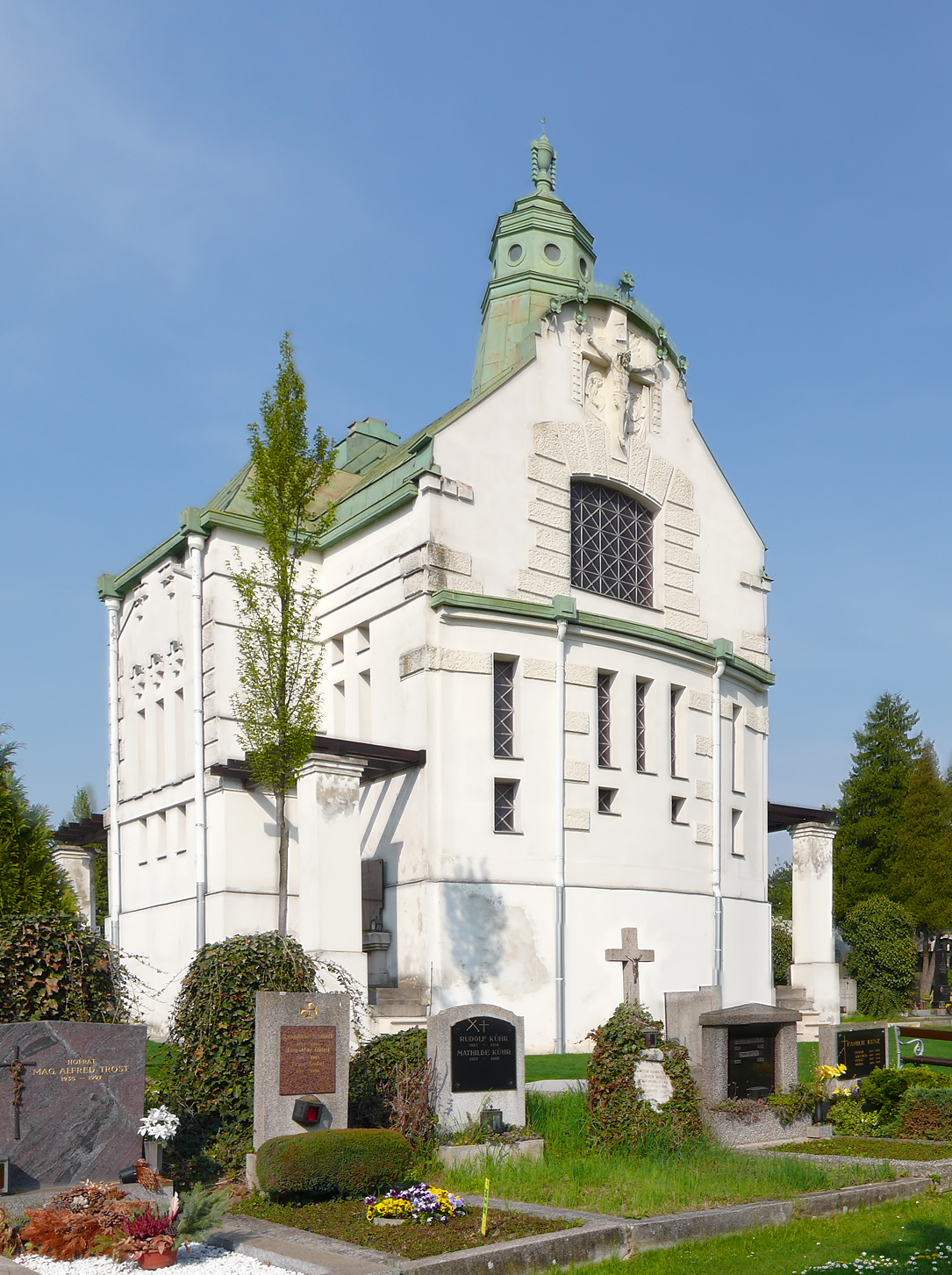
Rear view, showing the apse.

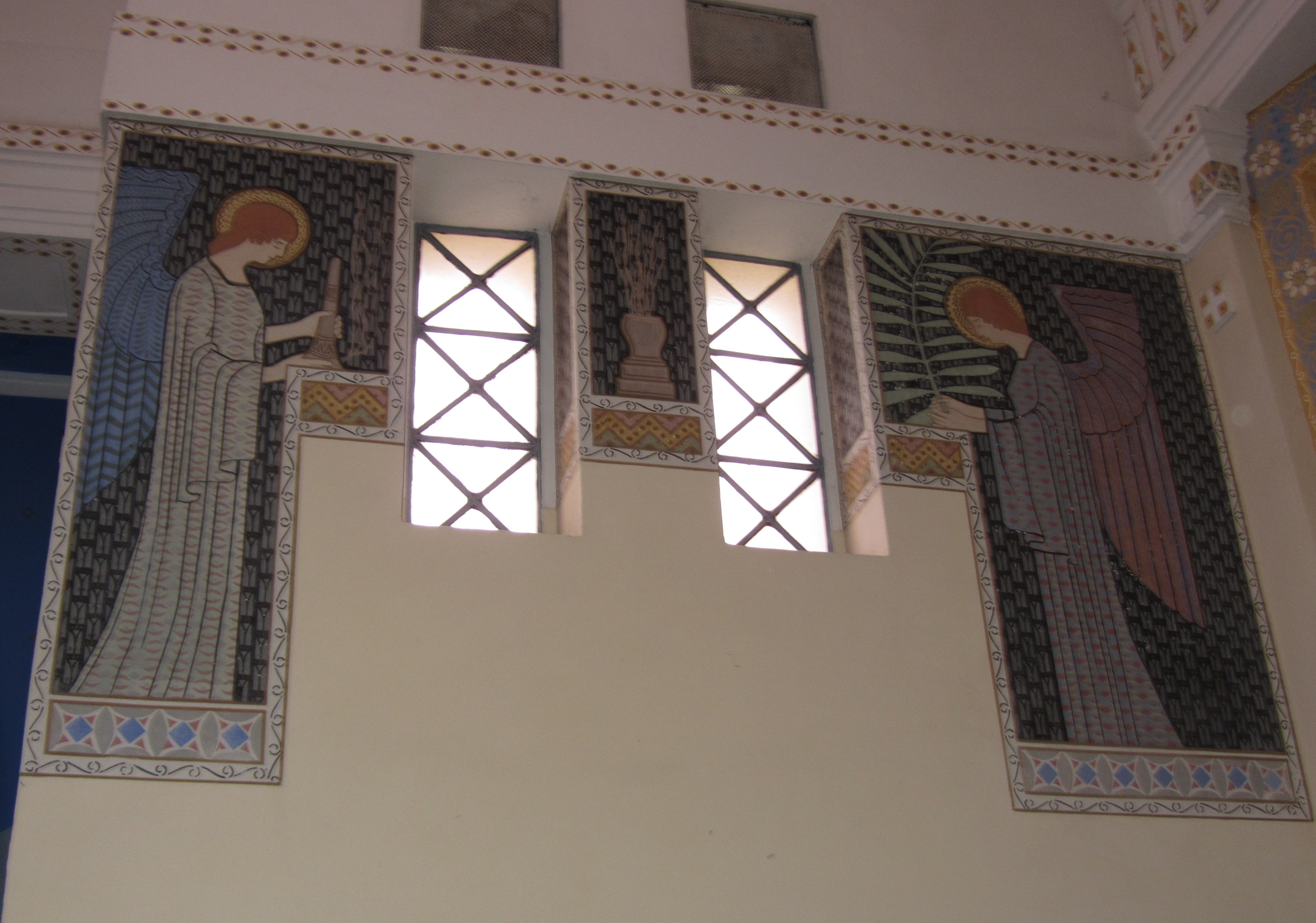
Murals and friezes inside the chapel.

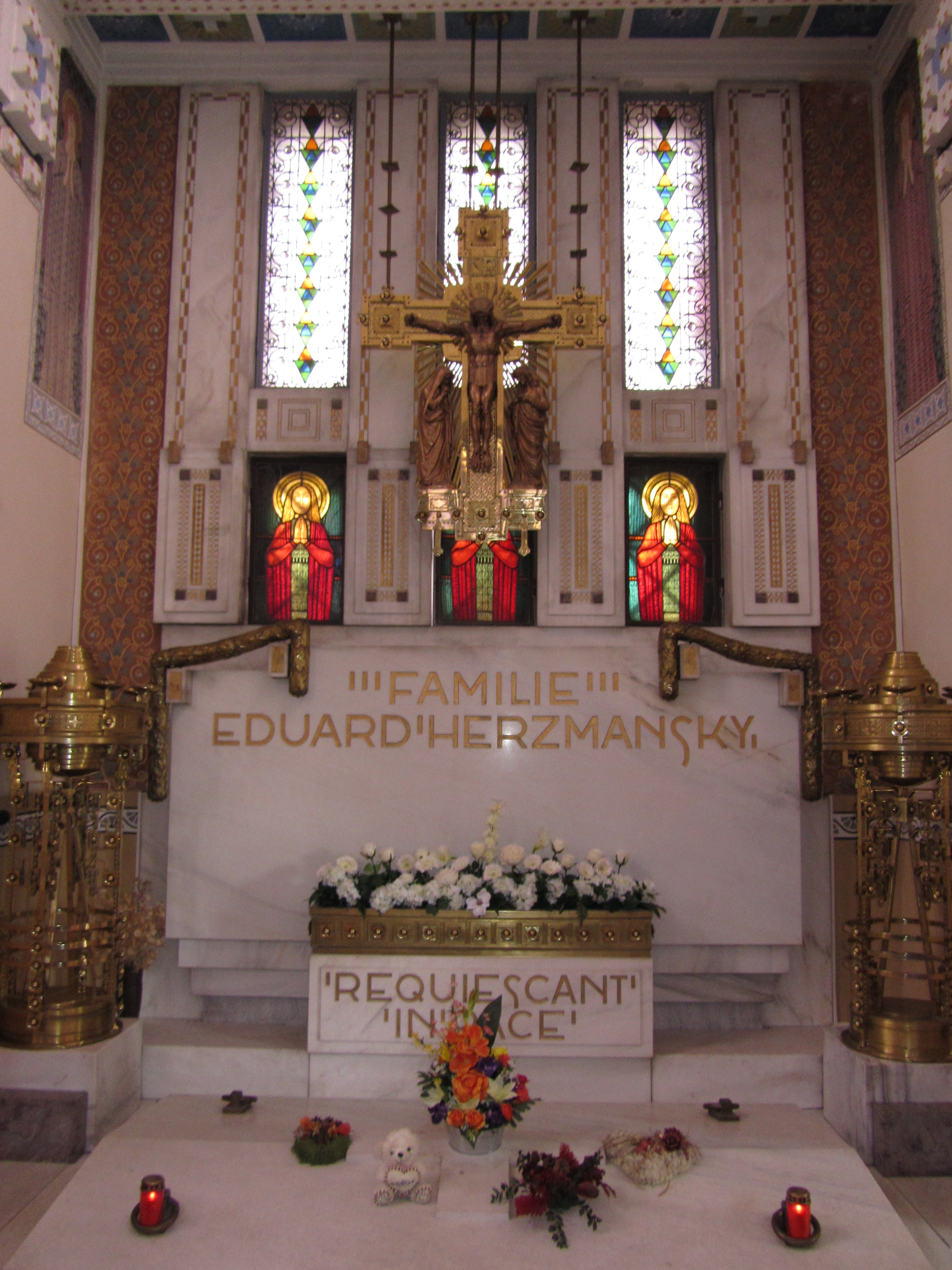
Eduard Herzmansky's family tomb, note the stained glass windows.

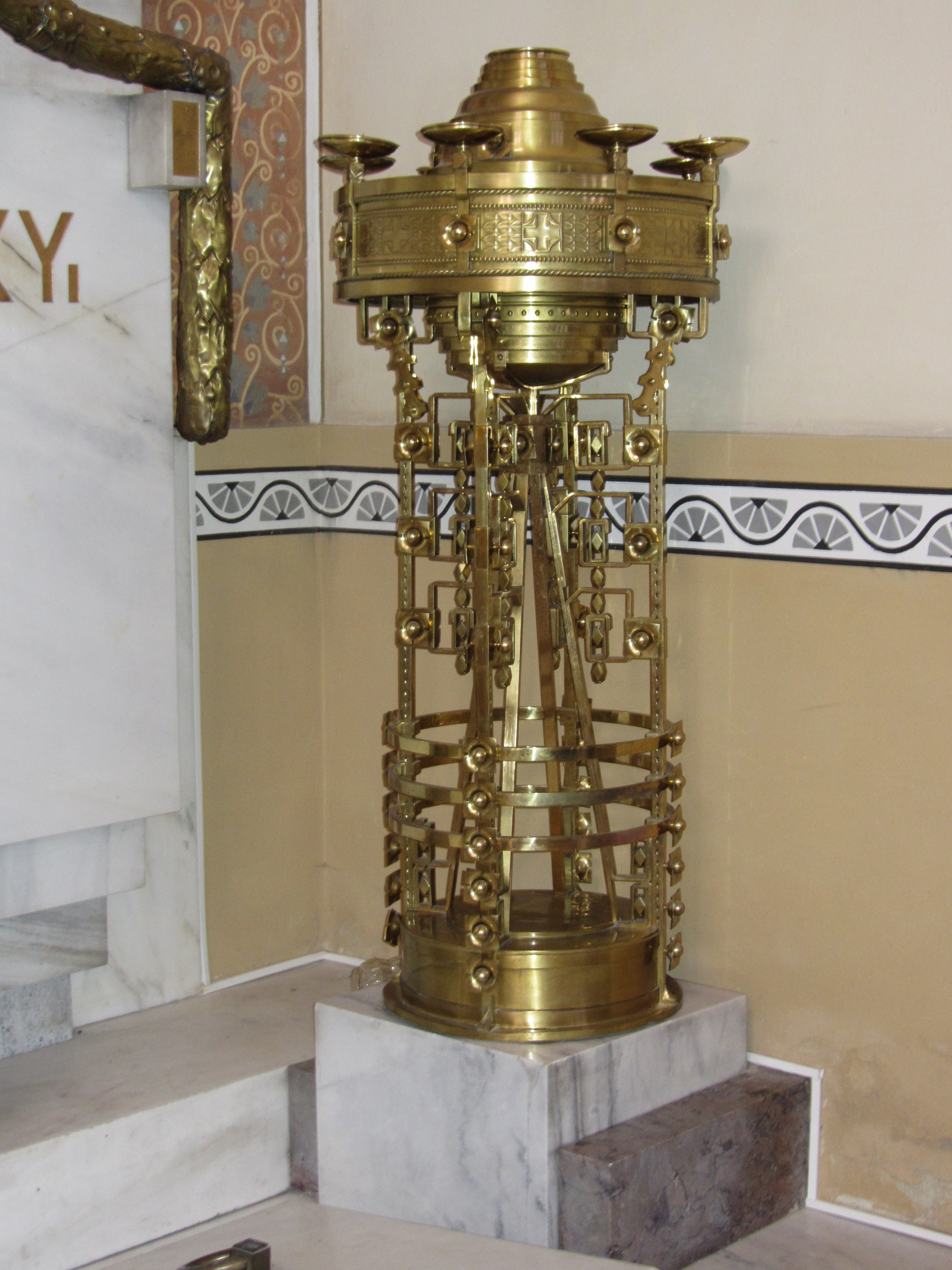
Detail of Art Nouveau candelabra.

=== Other public commissions ===
Hegele designed several public buildings in his career, mostly in the years between 1904 and 1911. The March Dam Chapel (Marchdammkapelle) was built in Engelhartstetten, Lower Austria, from 1904 to 1906, and dedicated to St. Florian in the presence of the Emperor. It was meant to celebrate the completion of the Marchfeld Dam, after forty years of works. The chapel, a collaboration with August Rehak, is a historicist stone building where the Secessionstil influence appears only in some details, in particular the entrance. Hegele's Fillgraderstiege is a staircase completed in 1905‒1907 in the Mariahilf district of Vienna, raccording the streets of Fillgradergasse and Theobaldgasse, on different levels. Built in the Secessionist style, with stone and cast iron, in 2004 the staircase was named the fourth most beautiful of Europe in a contest. In 1908 Austrian industrialist Arthur Krupp hired Max Hegele and Baurat Hans Peschl as architects for two school buildings in Berndorf. The schools' exterior display a historicist palace-like design (hence the name Schulpalästen, "School Palaces") while inside each classroom was decorated in a different historical style, from Doric to Empire, by academic painters Franz Wilhelm Ladewig and Robert Jüttner following Krupp's original idea. In the same year, Hegele collaborated once again with Rehak for the Flözersteig Bridge, that links Vienna's 14th and 16th districts. The bridge is an example of functional structure within the Vienna Secession aesthetics. His monument to polish pianist Theodor Leschetizky, in Türkenschanzpark (18th district), was completed in 1911; it consists of a curving wall with a bench. A medallion with a relief by sculptor Hugo Taglang depicts the musician.

From this projects and considering also the ones that were not realized, it appears more clearly that, despite being regarded primarily as a secessionist architect, Hegele's style was nonetheless deeply rooted in historicism and even ancient rural English churches may have had some influence on his style.

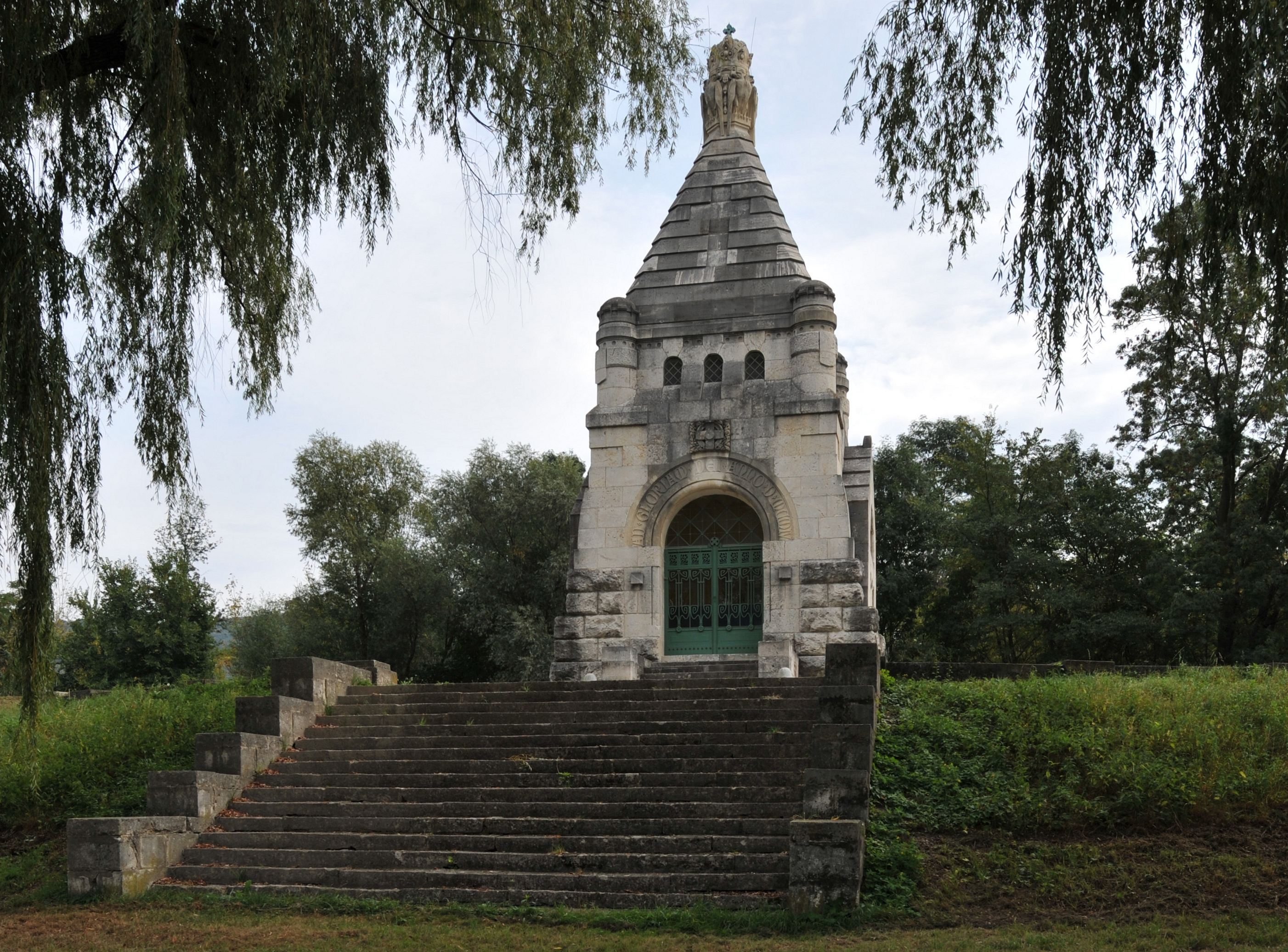
The March Dam Chapel, Engelhartstetten.

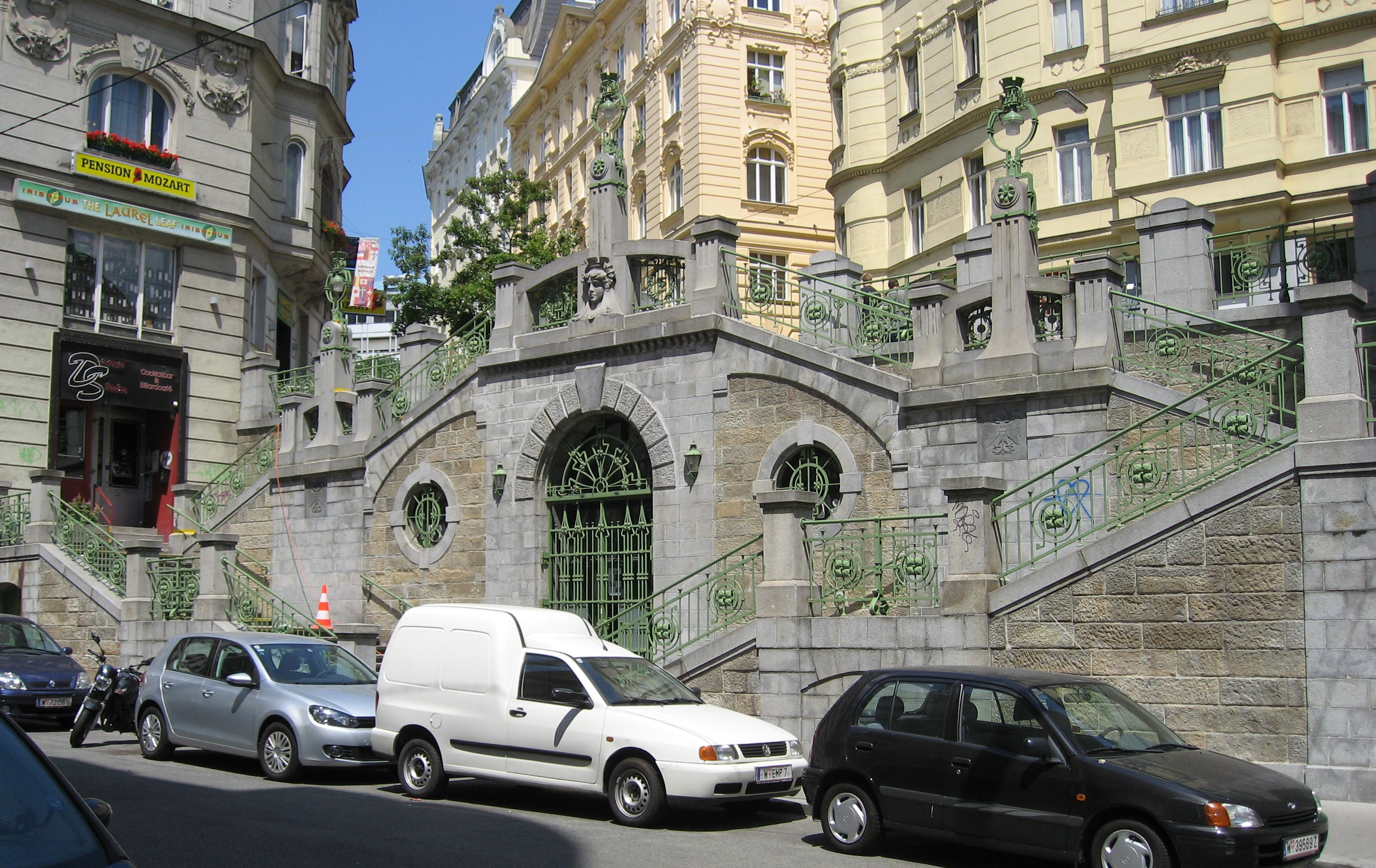
The Fillgraderstiege, Mariahilf, Vienna.

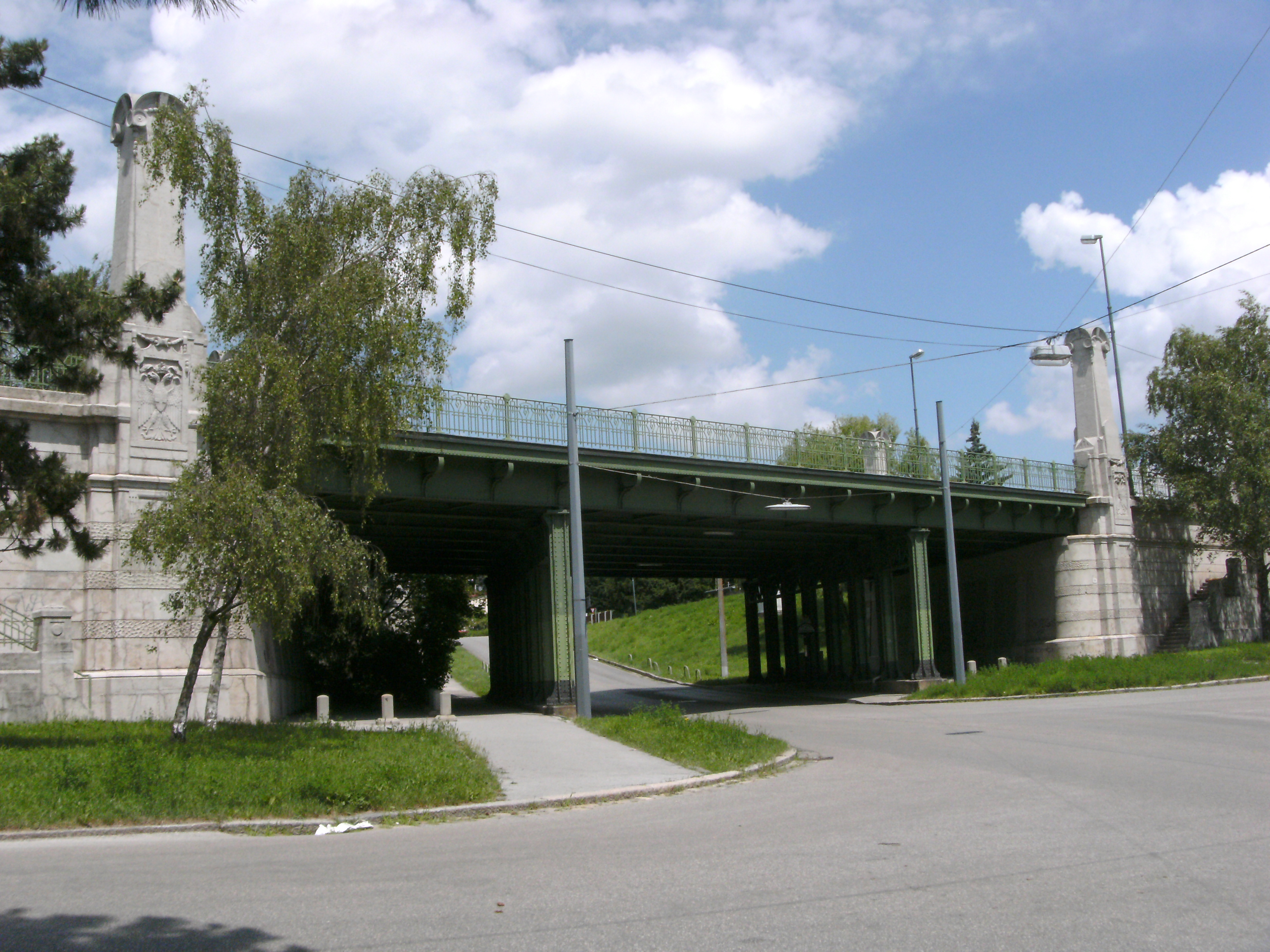
The Flözersteig Bridge, 14th‒16th districts, Vienna.

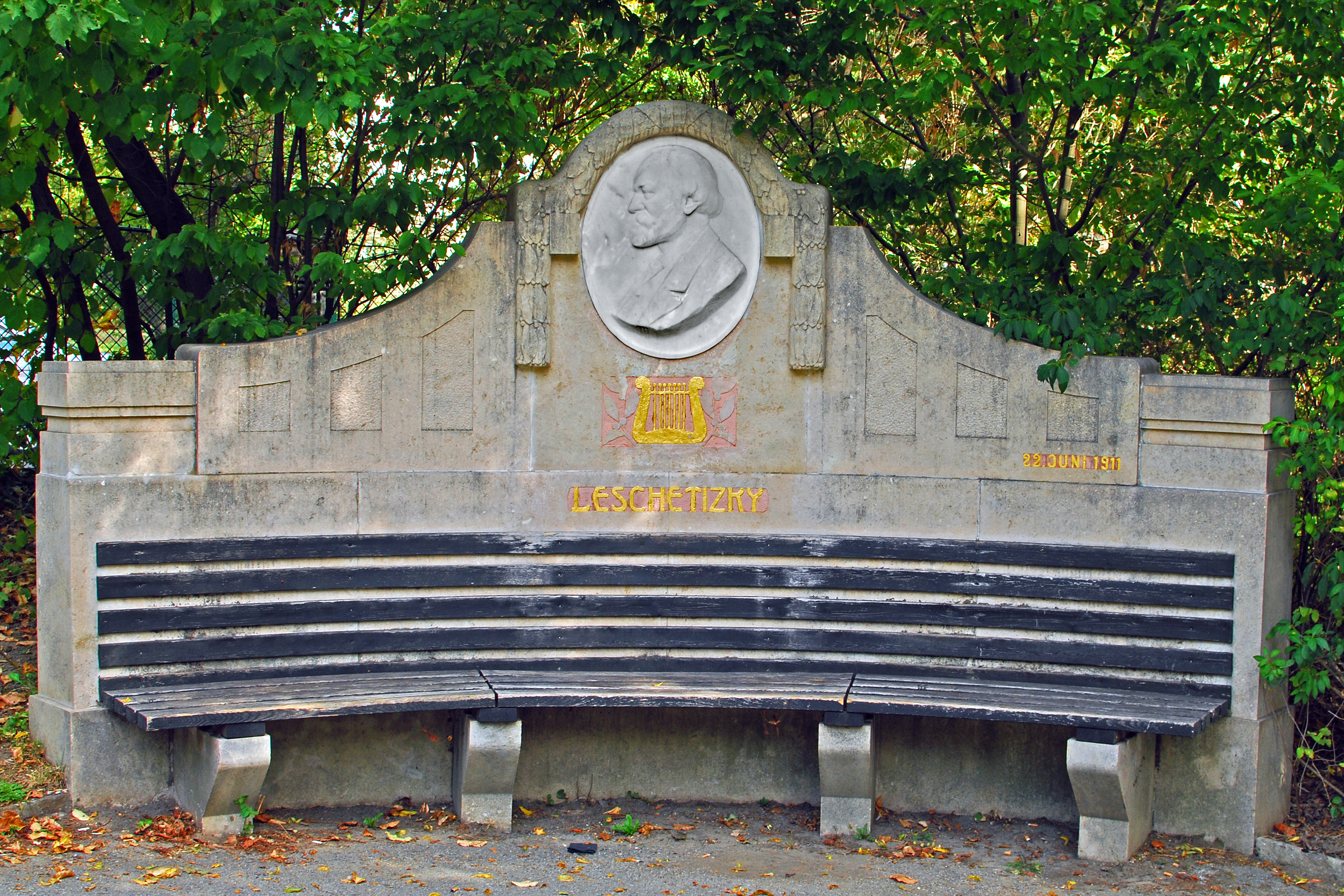
Theodor Leschetizky Monument with bench, 18th district Vienna.

=== Residential buildings and war years ===
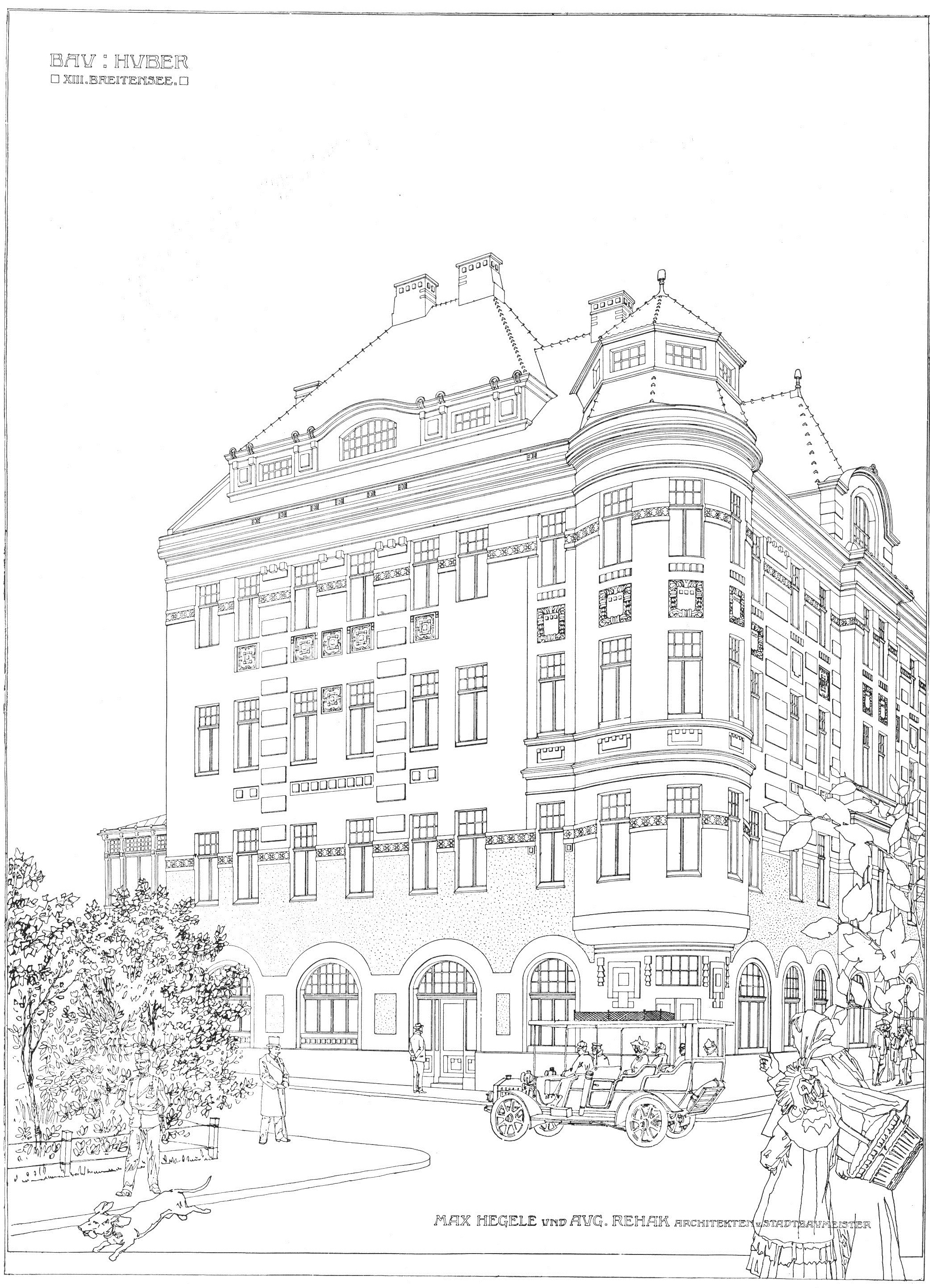
Breitenseer Straße apartment building, drawing by Max Hegele.

In 1906‒1907 Hegele and Rehak conceived and built an apartment block in Breitenseer Straße, Vienna. This four storey building is characterised by a picturesque corner turret with pointed roof and the presence of both geometric and floral ornamentation. Hegele carefully studied every single detail, even the chimneys. The influence of the Vienna Secession appears from the roof as well, where the architects made use of metal and glass to shape the attic.

Except for this early example, it was in the 1910s that Hegele's activity in the field of residential architecture intensified. In 1912 he completed three adjacent apartment buildings in Wiesbergaße, Vienna. The facades were designed to raccord with each other, giving the impression of one single block. Decoration is simple and its disposition differentiate one section from the other; as usual Hegele paid much attention to details, in particular the entrances. Other two buildings were erected in 1914 in Kriemhildplatz, at the corners with Markgraf-Rüdiger Straße, opposing each other and designed to look symmetrical. Fluted lesenes with secessionist capitals adorn the ground floor, while gables and simple stucco decorations in the upper floors enrich the otherwise strikingly plain facades. This stripped down appearance reflects a general trend of viennese architecture: in the 1910s many architects tended to move towards simpler designs with little ornament and occasionally austere stone facades (Otto Wagner himself went down this path).

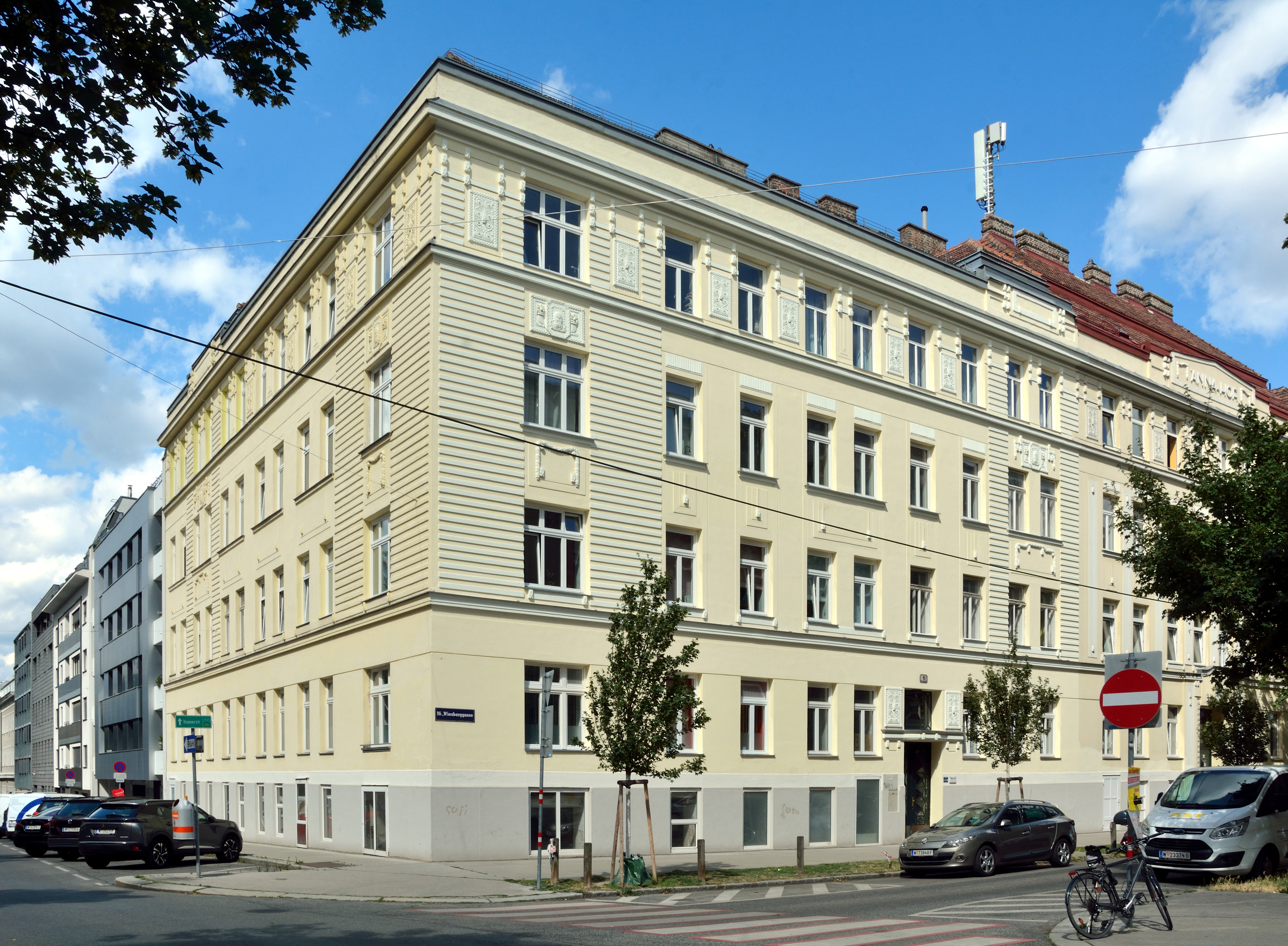
Building at Wiesberggasse 6.

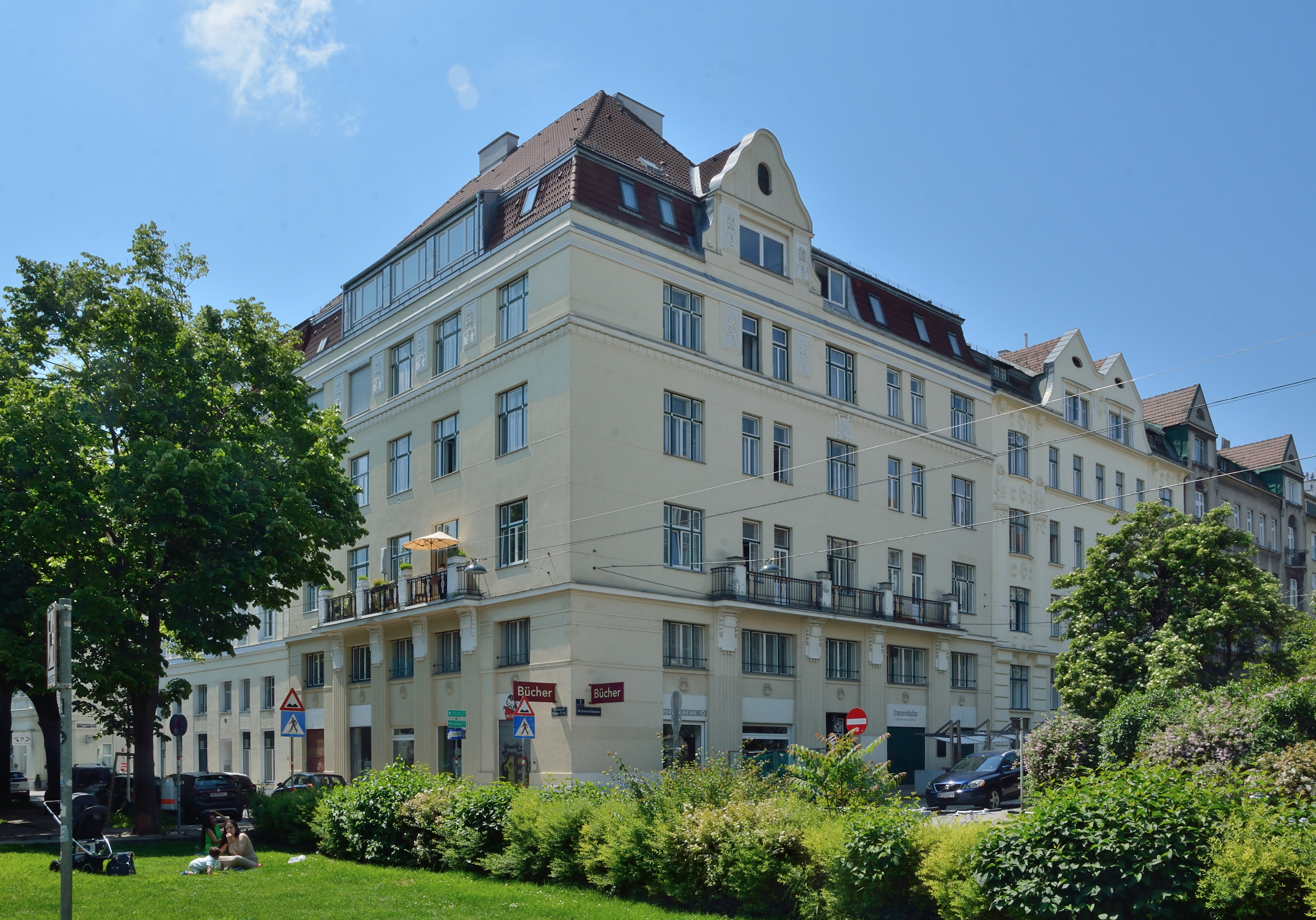
Building at Kriemhildplatz 1.

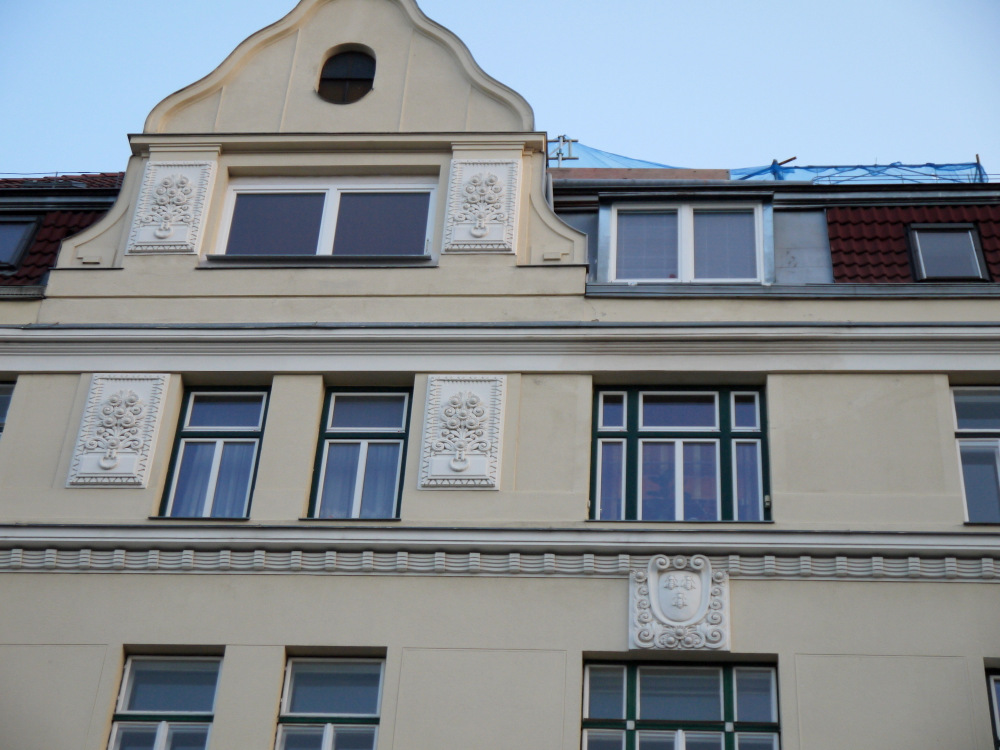
Kriemhildplatz 1, detail of the upper floor with gable.

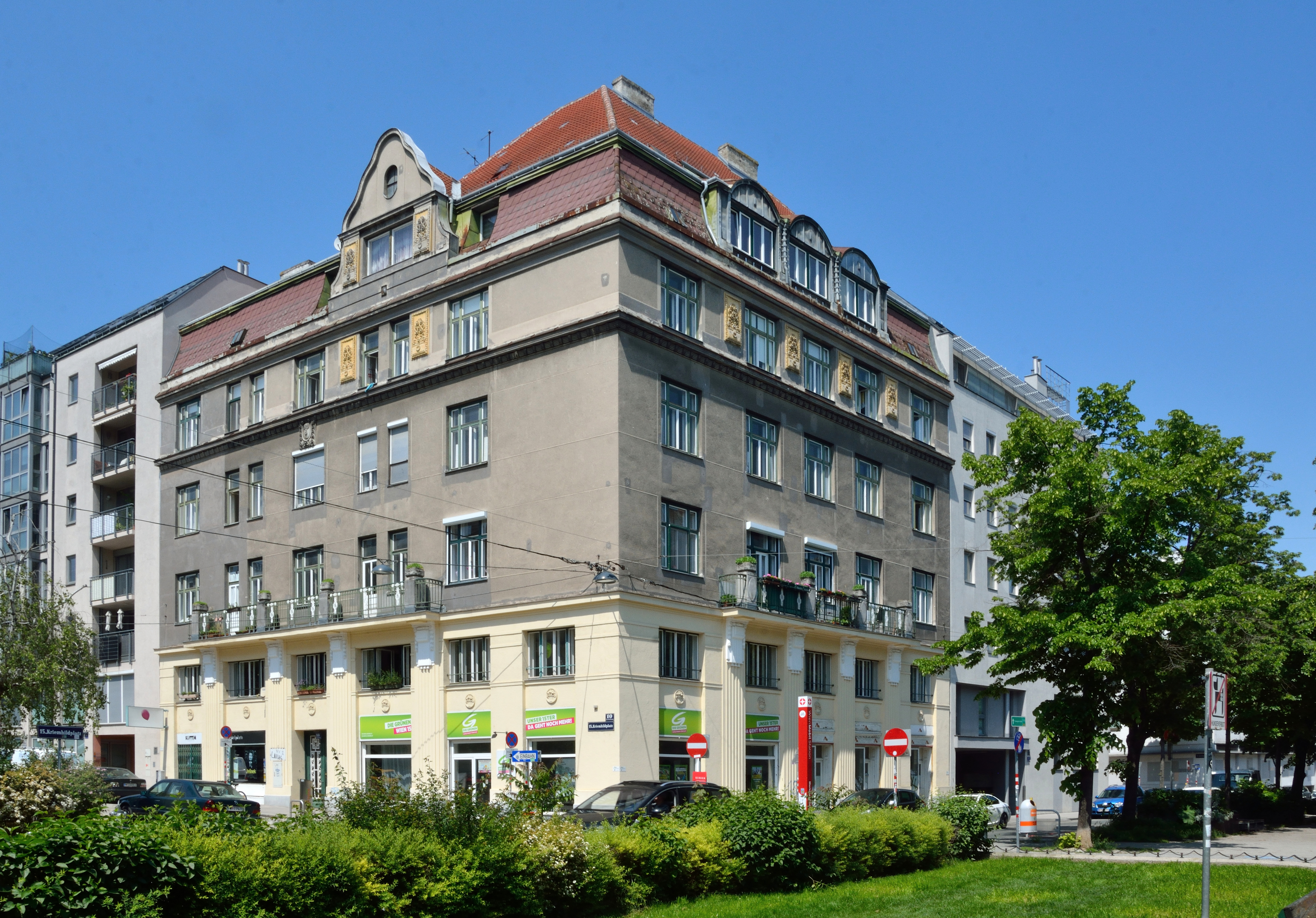
Building at Kriemhildplatz 10.

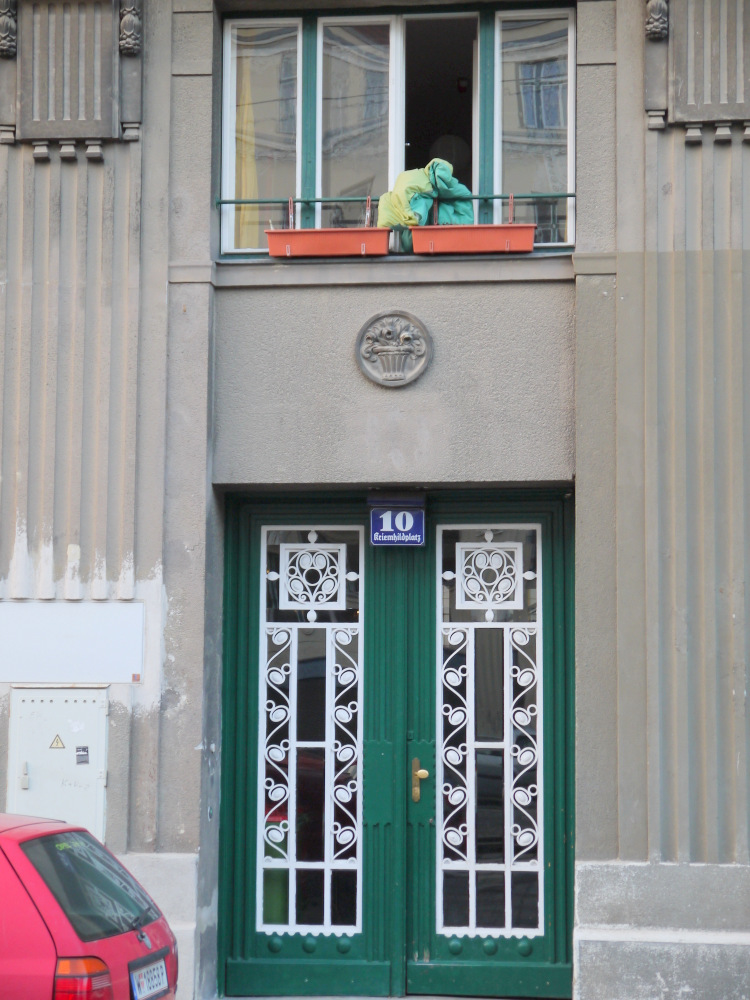
Kriemhildplatz 10, detail of the entrance.

During the First World War Hegele temporarily stopped his teaching activity as he was appointed director of works for the Imperial Military Academy, with the rank of lieutenant. The war halted the construction of his Aspern Bridge (Aspernbrücke), in central Vienna, which had started in 1913. Ironworkers had to serve in arms factories to sustain the war effort and, even after the end of the conflict, a lack of coal (needed for the concrete production) further delayed the resumption of work. The Aspernbrücke, a tied arch bridge, was finally opened on 1 December 1919, but was not actually complete until 1922. Unfortunately, it was destroyed in 1945 during the Second World War, when the German Army mined it.

=== Later years ===
After the war, the Austro-Hungarian Empire disintegrated and a republic was proclaimed. Secessionstil was over and out of style in Red Vienna; given the lack of commissions in the capital, Hegele worked mainly in Lower Austria. One of the major projects he realized in this period is St. Pölten's Regional Health Insurance building (in collaboration with Florian Prantl), designed in 1925‒1926 in an architectural style typical of interwar Austria: elementary geometrical shapes, rigid lines, very simple ornamentation and pointed arches. Heavily altered and simplified between the late 1950s and the early 1960s, the building was torn down in the 2000s.

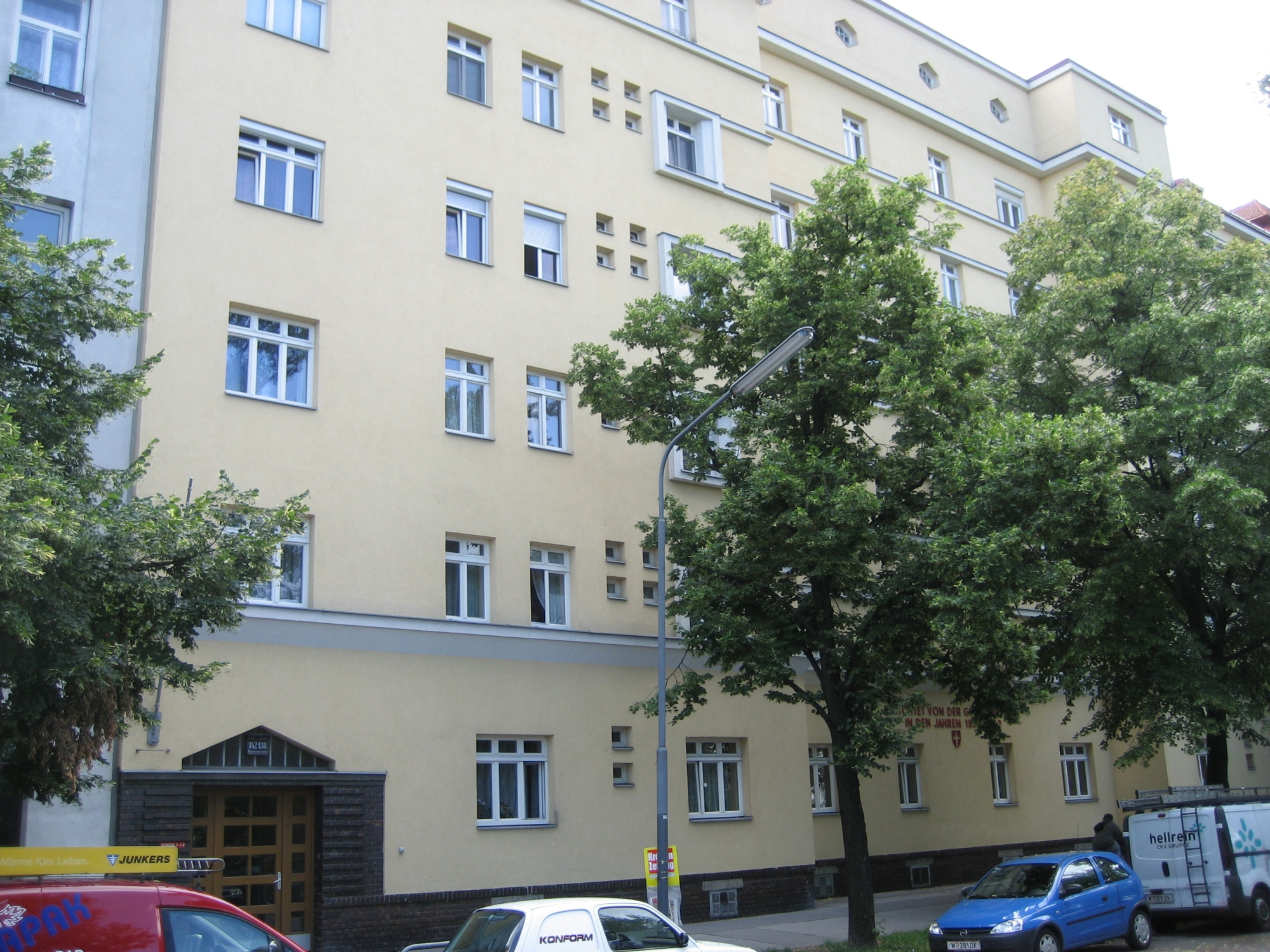
Apartment building in Brigittenauer Lände, Vienna. Built in 1931‒1932 following Hegele's plans.

He continued to design residential buildings in Vienna and in smaller towns as well. One notable example is the apartment block built in the early 1930s in Brigittenauer Lände, 20th district of Vienna. A symmetrical imposing structure, it is characterised by horizontal lines, with mouldings separating floors and polygonal windows. Another representative example of Hegele's later style is the apartment building in Roseggerstraße, St. Pölten (1929). Quiet traditional in its layout, it is characterized by the use of black bricks creating vertical stripes that enhance the structure's corners. The disposition of windows, chimneys and mouldings contributes to its balanced and symmetrical look. In the gable of the central block is a rilief with a couple of putti. This works show how Hegele, despite having moved away from Art Nouveau, still paid much attention to detail and never completely abandoned decoration.

In 1937 Hegele ceased his activity as professor at the Trade School and retired in Hadersdorf-Weidlingau where he lived with his wife until his death in 1945. He is buried in the Hadersdorf-Weidlingau cemetery, not far from the chapel he had designed in the heyday of his career.

== Personal life and legacy ==
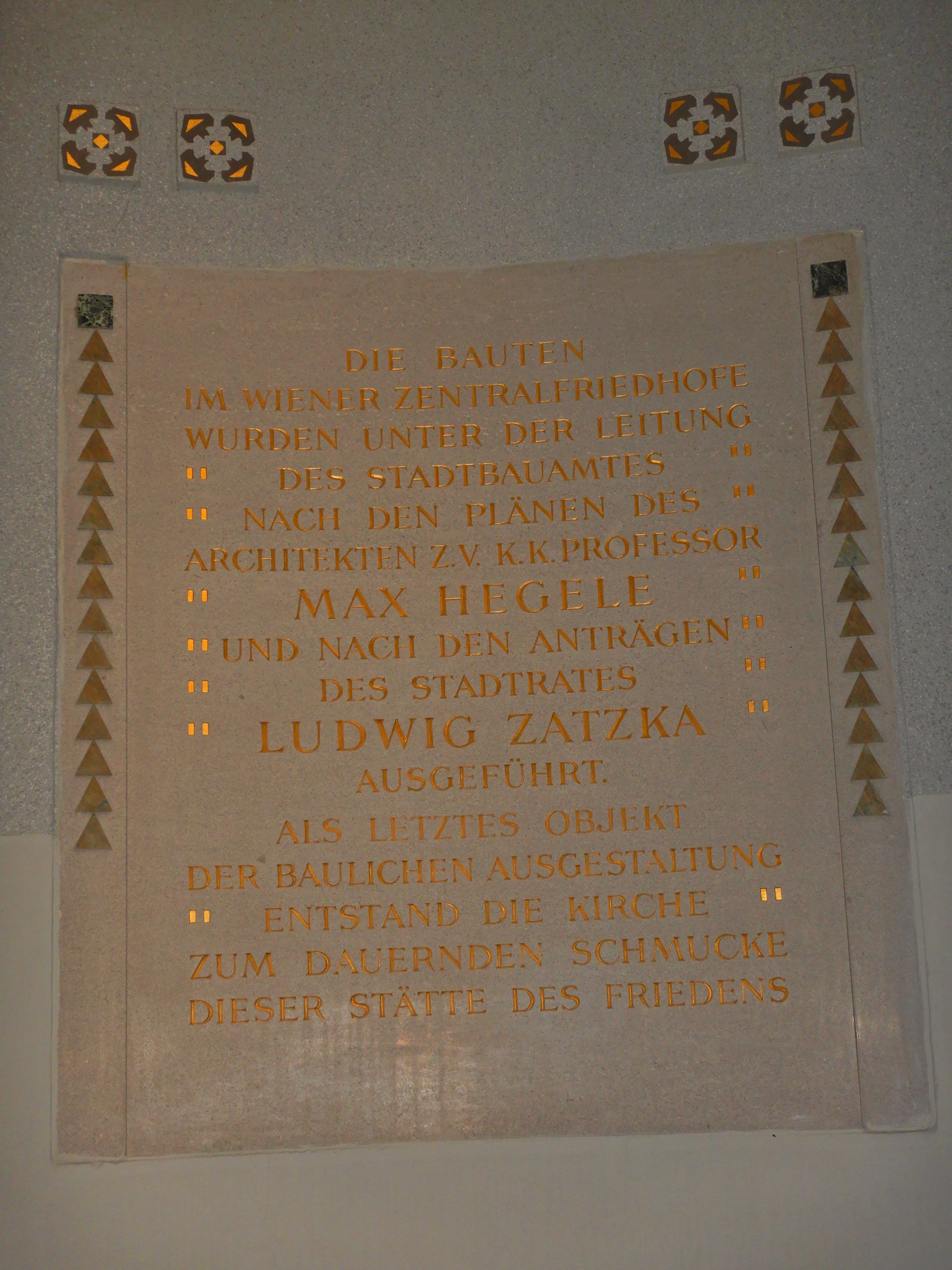
Commemorative plaque, reading: "The buildings of Vienna's Central Cemetery were realized under the direction of the City's Building Office following plans by architect and Imperial-Royal professor Max Hegele and city councilor Ludwig Zatzka."

Hegele married Wilhelmine Stelzer in 1908, they had children but he was survived by none of them. After wedding the couple settled in Hadersdorf-Weidlingau, today part of Vienna's 14th district, but then an independent municipality. Wilhelmine lived until 1963. Max Hegele was a Roman Catholic and this may explain why he designed many religious buildings.

Hegele is mainly remembered for his redevelopment of Vienna's Central Cemetery and a historical marker inside the St. Charles Borromeo Church acknowledges his work. Nonetheless, during his lifetime he produced a great number of designs and took part in several architectural contests since the beginning of his career. However, despite usually ranking high in such competitions, many of his projects remained unrealized.

Regarding Hegele's artistic evolution, from his early concepts owing much to Wagner, to his own style emerging in the Vienna's Cemetery project, art critic and his contemporary Ferdinand Fellner von Feldegg described him as: "Another talent who, caught in his early days by the fever for modernity, managed to recover by himself."

=== Max Hegele and Otto Wagner ===
Hegele's early designs show the influence that Otto Wagner, 32 years his senior, had on him as a secessionist architect. Wagner during his career developed an architectural language that inspired younger architects like Hegele and his aesthetic experimentation provided many ideas to them; the geometric ornamentation is an example of how Wagner's concept was further developed by Hegele. Moreover, Wagner may have significantly contributed to Hegele's breakthrough as he was a member of the jury that selected his project for Vienna's Central Cemetery.

It has also been argued that Hegele himself could have inspired Wagner, with his St. Charles Borromeo Church being a model for Wagner's St. Leopold Church (1903‒1907). Indeed, despite being built when the St. Leopold Church was already complete, the St. Charles Borromeo Church was based on a project that dated back to 1899. Furthermore, Wagner had examined Hegele's plans during the contest. An exhibition about Hegele, also exploring this possibility, was held at the Penzing District Museum in 2010.

== Works ==
This is an incomplete list of works by Max Hegele.

Public buildings

- 1903‒1911: Cemetery Halls I and II, Cemetery Gate, St. Charles Borromeo Cemetery Church and colonnades with columbarium, Central Cemetery, Vienna 11th (1899 contest, 1st prize)
- 1904‒1906: March Dam Chapel, Markthof an der March, Lower Austria (with August Rehak)
- 1905‒1907: Fillgraderstiege, Fillgradergasse, Vienna 6th
- 1906‒1908: Parish Church, Pressbaum, Lower Austria (with August Rehak, selected competition)
- 1908: Flözersteig Bridge, Vienna 14th‒16th
- 1908‒1909: Hadersdorf-Weidlingau Cemetery Chapel, Friedhofstrasse 12–14, Vienna 14th
- 1908‒1909: "School Palaces", Margaretenplatz 2 and 5, Berndorf, (with Hans Peschl from Ludwig Baumann's concept)
- 1909‒1910: Eduard Herzmansky family tomb, Hadersdorf-Weidlingauer Cemetery, Friedhofstraße 12–14, Vienna 14th
- before 1911 Savings Bank in Pressbaum, Lower Austria
- 1911: Theodor Leschititzky monument and bench in Türkenschanzpark, Vienna 18th (with sculptor Hugo Taglang)
- 1913‒1919: Aspern Bridge over the Danube Canal, Uferbauten, Vienna 1st-2nd (destroyed)
- 1925‒1926: Lower Austria's Regional Health Insurance building, Dr. Karl Renner Promenade 14, St. Pölten (with Florian Prantl, destroyed)

Residential and commercial buildings

- 1906‒1907: Apartment building, Breitenseer Straße 37 / Muthsamgasse, Vienna 14th (with August Rehak)
- 1912: Apartment buildings, Huttengasse 55 / Wiesberggasse 2, 4, 6 / Enenkelstraße 10, Vienna 16th
- 1914: Apartment buildings, Kriemhildplatz 1 and 10, Vienna 15th
- 1914‒1916: Villa Bistritzky, Schindeltal 2, Inner-Wiesenbach, Sankt Veit an der Gölsen, Lower Austria
- 1929: Apartment Building, Roseggerstraße 9, St. Pölten, Lower Austria
- 1931‒1932: Apartment block, Brigittenauer Lände 138–142, Vienna 20th

Interior designs

- 1908: Property of Imperial-Royal court painter Leopold Jell (for Vienna's Jubilee Trade Exhibition)
- Designs of various other interiors

Unrealized projects

- 1898: Project for the redevelopment of Karlsplatz, Vienna 1st (with F. Neumann e A. Wildhack, contest entry, 2nd prize)
- 1901: Emperor Franz Joseph City Museum, Karlsplatz, Vienna 1st (pre-competition entry)
- 1903: Two countryside churches (sketches)
- 1907: Exhibition Hall entrance (for the 1908 Congress of Architects)
- 1907: Museum of popular arts and crafts of Tyrol, Innsbruck (contest entry)
- 1909: Ferdinand Bridge / Sweden Bridge, Vienna 1st-2nd
- 1909: Vienna Technical Museum, Vienna 14th (contest entry)
- 1910: Seats and observation tower of the Trabrennbahn Krieau (with the Drexler brothers, contest entry, 3rd prize)
- 1910: Nursing Home in Karlsbad, Bohemia (today Karlovy Vary, Czech Republic; competition entry)
- 1911: Public Bath in Komotau, Bohemia (today Chomutov, Czech Republic; competition entry)
- 1912: Emperor Franz Joseph City Museum, Schmelz, Vienna 15th (contest entry, 3rd prize)
- 1913: Resting place for the Knights of the Order of Maria Theresa in the Schmelz, Vienna (contest entry)
- 1913: Cemetery complex of Tetschen on Elbe, Bohemia (today Děčín, Czech Republic; contest entry, 2nd prize)
- 1914: Chamber of commerce and industry, Linz, Upper Austria (with F. Pindt)
- 1914: New Colonnade in Franzensbad, Bohemia (today Františkovy Lázně, Czech Republic; contest entry)
- 1915: Plan for the completion of the Schottenring, part of the Ringstraße, Vienna (contest entry, won one of the 5 prizes)
- 1915: Project for the rebuilding of Stadtpark's Kursalon, Vienna 1st (contest entry, won one of the 5 prizes)
- 1919: Secondary school in Oderberg, Brandenburg, Germany (contest entry)
- 1920: New buildings for the Technical University, Vienna 3rd (with F. Pindt, contest entry, 3rd prize, no 1st prize awarded)
- 1920: Barcelona Riding Club clubhouse, Spain (competition entry)
- 1926: Project for the rebuilding of the Vienna Künstlerhaus, Vienna 1st (contest entry)
