= Branislav =

Slavic masculine given name

- Pronunciation: Czech: [ˈbraɲɪslaf] Slovak: [ˈbraɲisɫau̯] Serbo-Croatian: [brǎnislaʋ]
- Gender: masculine

Origin
- Language: Slavic

Other names
- Short form: Branko
- Derived: borna (to protect, to defend) and slava (glory, fame)
- Related names: Branislava (f), Bronislav, Bronisław, Branimir

Branislav (Cyrillic: Бранислав) is a Slavic masculine given name, derived from the Slavic elements borna (to protect, to defend) and slava (glory, fame) and means "warrior", "defender of the glory". The feminine form of the name is Branislava.

Branislav is a common given name in Croatian, Slovak and Serbian. It also appears in Polish as Bronisław and in Czech, Ukrainian and Russian as Bronislav. A short form of the name is Brano. Nicknames in the different languages include Branko, Branio, Broněk, Broniek, Slávek, Slavo, Bane, Brane, Braňo, Braniša, Bruno.

== Branislav in other languages ==
- Belarusian: Браніслаў / Branisłaŭ (Branislaw)
- Czech: Bronislav or Branislav
- Croatian: Branislav
- Lithuanian: Bronislovas, Bronius
- Polish: Bronisław
- Russian: Бронислав (Bronislav)
- Serbian: Бранислав / Branislav, Бранисав / Branisav or Бранко / Branko
- Slovak: Branislav or Braňo
- Slovenian: Brane
- Ukrainian: Боронислав (Boronyslav), Броніслав (Bronislav) (more commonly used than the former)

== Notable people with the name ==
=== A-J ===
- Branislav Andjelić (born 1959), Serbian Internet pioneer, economist and politician
- Branislav Angelovski (born 1977), Macedonian handball player
- Branislav Atanacković (born 1983), Serbian footballer
- Branislav Bajić (born 1977), Serbian footballer
- Branislav Belić (1932–2016), Serbian politician
- Branislav Blažić (1957–2020), Serbian surgeon and politician
- Branislav Bogaroški (born 1976), Serbian politician
- Branislav Borenović (born 1974), Bosnian Serb politician
- Branislav Čonka (born 1989), Serbian footballer
- Branislav Crnčević (1933–2011), Serbian writer and politician
- Branislav Crnogorac (born 1952), Bosnian judoka and judo trainer
- Branislav Damjanov (born 1965) is a Serbian politician
- Branislav Danilović (born 1988), Serbian footballer
- Branislav Đekić (born 1991), Serbian basketball player
- Branislav Dešković (1883–1939), Croatian sculptor
- Branislav Djurdjev (1908–1993), Yugoslav and Serbian historian and orientalist
- Branislav Drobnjak (born 1961), Montenegrin footballer
- Branislav Đukanović (born 1959), Montenegrin footballer
- Branislav Fodrek (born 1981), Slovak football player and coach
- Branislav Fábry (born 1985), Slovak ice hockey player
- Branislav Grbić, Kosovar Serb politician
- Branislav Gröhling (born 1974), Slovak politician
- Branislav Gálik (born 1973), Slovak tennis player
- Branislav Hrnjiček (1908–1964), Serbian footballer
- Branislav Hronec (1940–2022), Slovak composer, pianist and conductor
- Branislav Ikonić (1928–2002), Serbian politician
- Branislav Ivanović (born 1984), Serbian footballer
- Branislav Ivković (born 1952), Serbian politician
- Branislav Jakubec (born 1967), Slovak wheelchair curler
- Branislav Janković (born 1992), Montenegrin footballer
- Branislav Jankovič (born 1991), Slovak ice hockey player
- Branislav Jánoš (born 1971), Slovak ice hockey player
- Branislav Jašurek (born 1982), Slovak footballer
- Branislav Jerinić (1932–2006), Serbian actor
- Branislav Jovanović (politician) (born 1955), Serbian politician
- Branislav Jovanović (born 1985), Serbian footballer

=== K-P ===
- Branislav Karaulić (born 1963), Serbian hurdler
- Branislav Kerac (born 1952), Serbian comic book creator
- Branislav Knežević (born 2002), Serbian footballer
- Branislav Kojić (1899-1987), Serbian architect and painter
- Branislav Konrád (born 1987), Slovak ice hockey player
- Branislav Kovačević (1953–2010), Serbian playwright, politician, and activist
- Branislav Krunić (born 1979), Bosnian football player and coach
- Branislav Kubala (1949–2018), Spanish footballer
- Branislav Kubka (born 1988), Slovak ice hockey player
- Branislav Labant (born 1976), Slovak footballer
- Branislav Lala Kovačev (1939–2012), Yugoslavian-Serbian jazz musician, bandleader and composer
- Branislav Lečić (born 1955), Serbian actor and politician
- Branislav Lončar (1937–2019), Serbian sport shooter
- Branislav Ľupták (born 1991), Slovak footballer
- Branislav Martinović (1937–2015), Serbian wrestler
- Branislav Mezei (born 1980), Slovak ice hockey player
- Branislav Mićić (born 1990), Swiss-Serbian footballer
- Branislav Mihajlović (1936–1991), Serbian footballer
- Branislav Mihajlović (politician) (born 1953), Serbian politician
- Branislav Milinković (1961–2012), Serbian political activist and diplomat
- Branislav Miličević (born 1983), Serbian footballer
- Branislav "Branko" Milićević, Serbian actor
- Branislav Milosavljević (1879–1944), Serbian poet and army colonel
- Branislav Milošević (born 1988), Serbian footballer
- Branislav Mitrović (born 1985), Serbian water polo player
- Branislav Mitrović (politician) (born 1966), Serbian politician
- Branislav Mojićević (born 1986), Serbian singer
- Branislav Mráz (born 1973), Slovak football player and manager
- Branislav Nedimović (born 1977), Serbian politician
- Branislav Niňaj (born 1994), Slovak footballer
- Branislav Notaros, American electrical engineering professor
- Branislav Novaković (born 1958), Serbian footballer
- Branislav Nušić (1864–1938), Serbian playwright, satirist and novelist
- Branislav Obžera (born 1981), Slovak footballer
- Branislav Ondruš (born 1973), Slovak television presenter and politician
- Branislav Petronijević (1875–1954), Serbian philosopher and paleontologist
- Branislav Pindroch (born 1991), Slovak footballer
- Branislav Pipović (born 1959), Serbian writer
- Branislav Pokrajac (1947–2018), Serbian handball player
- Branislav Pomoriški (born 1956), Serbian entrepreneur and politician
- Branislav Prelević (born 1966), Serbian basketball player

=== R-Z ===
- Branislav Rajačić (1931–1992), Serbian basketball coach
- Branislav Rapáč (born 1993), Slovakice hockey player
- Branislav Ratkovica (born 1985), Serbian professional basketball player and coach
- Branislav Ristivojević (born 1972), Serbian academic and politician
- Branislav Rzeszoto (born 1975), Slovak footballer
- Branislav Sekulić (1906–1968), Yugoslav football player and manager
- Branislav Sekáč (born 1979), Slovak tennis player
- Branislav Simić (born 1935), Serbian Greco-Roman wrestler
- Branislav Sinadinovski (died 2021), Macedonian politician
- Branislav Škripek (born 1970), Slovak politician
- Branislav Sluka (born 1999), Slovak footballer
- Branislav Šoškić (1922–2022), Montenegrin politician
- Branislav Spáčil (born 2003), Slovak footballer
- Branislav Stamenković (born 1934), Serbian professional basketball player
- Branislav Stanić born 1988), Serbian footballer
- Branislav Stankovič (born 1965), Slovak tennis player
- Branislav Stojanović (born 1973), Serbian sprinter
- Branisłaŭ Taraškievič (1892–1938), Belarusian public figure, politician, and linguist
- Branislav Tomić (born 1995), Serbian footballer
- Branislav Trajković (born 1989), Serbian footballer
- Branislav Trifunović (born 1978), Serbian actor and film producer
- Branislav Tvarožek (born 1925), Slovak National Uprising participant and political prisoner.
- Branislav Varsik (1904–1994) was a Slovak historian and archivist
- Branislav Vićentić (born 1971), Serbian basketball player and coach
- Branislav Vukomanović (born 1981), Serbian footballer
- Branislav Vukosavljević (1929–1985), Serbian footballer
- Branislav Zebec (1929–1988), Croatian football player and manager

== See also ==
- Moro Branislav (born 1957), Serbian volleyball coach
- Branislava, female form of the name
- Bronislav
- Bronisław (given name)
- Slavic names
