= Bronisław (given name) =

Polish male given name

- Pronunciation: Bronisław: Polish: [brɔˈɲi.swaf]
- Gender: male
- Language: Polish

Origin
- Region of origin: Poland

Other names
- Related names: Bronisława (f), Bronislav, Branislav, Branimir, Bronislovas

Bronisław (Polish: [brɔˈɲi.swaf]) is a Polish masculine given name, derived from the Slavic elements borna (to protect, to defend) and slava (glory, fame). It is the Polish variant of the Slavic name Bronislav. The feminine form is Bronisława.

== Notable people with the name ==
- Bronisław Abramowicz (1837–1912), Polish painter
- Bronisław Baczko (1924–2016), Polish philosopher
- Bronisław Bandrowski (1879–1914), Polish philosopher and psychologist
- Bronisław Bebel (born 1949), Polish volleyball player
- Bronislaw Bernacki (1944–2024), Ukrainian Roman Catholic prelate
- Bronisław Bohaterewicz (1870–1940), Polish military commander and a general
- Bronisław Bula (born 1946), Polish footballer
- Bronisław Chromy (1925–2017), Polish sculptor and painter
- Bronisław Cieślak (1943–2021), Polish actor and politician
- Bronisław Czech (1908–1944), Polish sportsman and artist
- Bronisław Dąbrowski (1917–1997), Polish Roman Catholic bishop
- Bronisław Dankowski (1944–2020), Polish politician
- Bronisław Dardziński (1901–1971), Polish actor
- Bronisław Dembowski (1927–2019), Polish Catholic bishop
- Bronisław Dobrzyński, Polish musician, pianist and composer
- Bolesław Bronisław Duch (1896–1980), Polish army general and military official
- Bronisław Dutka (born 1957), Polish politician
- Bronisław Ferens (1912–1991), Polish ornithologist, conservationist, and professor
- Bronisław Fichtel (1896–1939), Polish footballer
- Bronisław Foltyn (born 1974), Polish politician
- Bronisław Gancarz (1906–1960), Polish track and field athlete
- Bronisław Geremek (1932–2008), Polish social historian and politician
- Bronisław Gostomski (1948–2010), Polish Roman Catholic priest
- Bronisław Gosztyła (1935–1991), Polish ice hockey player
- Bronisław Hager (1890–1969), Polish activist and public health pioneer
- Bronislaw M. Honigberg (1920–1992), Polish-American zoologist
- Bronisław Huberman (1882–1947), Polish violinist
- Bronisław Kaper (1902–1983), Polish film composer
- Bronisław Karwecki (1912–1998), Polish rower
- Bronisław Kentzer (1880–1939), Polish entrepreneur
- Bronisław Kłobucki (1896–1944), Polish sculptor and painter
- Bronisław Knaster (1893–1980), Polish mathematician
- Bronisław Komorowski (born 1952), Polish politician and historian, fifth president of Poland
- Bronisław Komorowski (priest) (1889–1940), Polish Roman Catholic priest and martyr
- Bronisław Koraszewski (1863–1924), Polish reporter and social activist
- Bronisław Kostkowski (1915–1942), Polish Roman Catholic seminarian and martyr
- Bronisław Krzywobłocki (1857–1943), Polish military officer
- Bronisław Kurzętkowski (1880–1939), Polish politician, lawyer, and social activist
- Bronisław Kuśnierz (1883–1966), Polish lawyer and politician
- Bronisław Kwiatkowski (1950–2010), Polish military commander
- Bronisław Łagowski (born 1937), Polish professor
- Bronisław Lewandowski (1947–1998), Polish tennis player
- Bronisław Linke, (1906–1962), Polish painter
- Bronisław Maj (born 1953), Polish poet and writer
- Bronisław Makowski (1905–1944), Polish footballer
- Bronisław Malinowski (1884–1942), Polish anthropologist and ethnologist
- Bronisław Malinowski (athlete) (1951–1981), Polish track and field athlete
- Bronisław Markiewicz, SDB (1842–1912), Polish Roman Catholic priest
- Bronislaw Masojada (born 1961), British businessman
- Bronislaw "Bronko" Nagurski (1908–1990), Canadian-American football player
- Bronislaw Onuf-Onufrowicz (1863–1928), Russian-American neurologist
- Bronisław Pawlicki (1925–2014), Polish field hockey player
- Bronisław Pawlik 1926–2002), Polish actor
- Bronisław Pieracki (1895–1934), Polish military officer and politician
- Bronisław Pięcik (1936–2010), Polish precision mechanic
- Bronisław Piłsudski (1866–1918), Polish ethnologist
- Bronisław von Poźniak (1887–1953), Austrian-German pianist
- Bronisław Prugar-Ketling (1891–1948), Polish general
- Bronisław Kazimierz Przybylski (1941–2011), Polish composer and educator
- Bronisław Radziszewski (1838–1914), Polish chemist
- Bronisław Rakowski (1895–1950), Polish general
- Bronisław Seichter (1902–1965), Polish footballer
- Bronisław Szlagowski (born 1938), Polish footballer
- Bronisław Szwarce (1834– 1904), Polish engineer and political activist
- Bronisław Trentowski (1808–1869), Polish philosopher
- Bronisław Trzebunia (born 1941), Polish alpine skier
- Tadeusz Bronisław Wałek-Czarnecki (1889–1949), Polish historian
- Bronisław Waligóra (born 1932), Polish football player and manager
- Bronisław Waruś, Polish slalom canoeist
- Bronisław Wesołowski (1870–1919), Polish communist revolutionary
- Bronisław Wildstein (born 1952), former Polish journalist
- Bronisław Witkowski (1899–1971), Polish luger
- Bronisław Wołkowicz (born 1973), Polish judoka
- Bronisław Zaleski (1819/20–1880), Polish-Belarusian political activist and writer
- Bronisław Żurakowski (1911–2009), Polish engineer and airplane constructor

== See also ==
- Bronisława (given name), feminine form of the name
- Bronislav
- Branislav
- Polish name
- Slavic names
