= Bronius =

- Gender: masculine
- Language: Lithuanian

Origin
- Language: Slavic
- Region of origin: Lithuania

Other names
- Derived: from the name Bronislovas
- Related names: Bronislav, Bronisław, Branislav

Bronius is a Lithuanian masculine given name. It is a shortened form of the name Bronislovas, which is derived from the Slavic name Bronislav / Bronisław.

Notable people with the name include:

- Bronius Kazys Balutis (1880–1967), Lithuanian diplomat
- Bronius Bružas (born 1941), Lithuanian stained glass artist
- Bronius Krivickas (1919–1952), Lithuanian writer, poet and anti-Soviet partisan
- Bronius Kutavičius (1932–2021), Lithuanian composer
- Bronius Kuzmickas (1935-2023), Lithuanian politician and philosopher
- Bronius Laurinavičius (1913–1981), Lithuanian priest
- Bronius Markauskas (born 1960), Lithuanian politician
- Bronius Vyšniauskas (1923–2015), Lithuanian sculptor

== See also ==
- Branislav
