= Bronislovas =

- Gender: masculine
- Language: Lithuanian

Origin
- Language: Slavic
- Region of origin: Lithuania

Other names
- Short form: Bronius
- Derived: borna (to protect, to defend) and slava (glory, fame)
- Related names: Bronislav, Bronisław, Branislav

Bronislovas is a Lithuanian masculine given name. It is derived from the Slavic names Branislav / Bronisław. A common shortened form of the name is Bronius.

Notable people with the name include:

- Bronislovas Burneikis (1923–1991), Lithuanian Catholic priest
- Bronislovas Genzelis (born 1934), Lithuanian politician
- Bronislovas Lubys (1938–2011), Lithuanian entrepreneur, former Prime Minister of Lithuania
- Bronislovas Paukštys (1897–1966), Lithuanian Catholic priest
- Bronislovas Rudys (born 1954), Lithuanian art artist

== See also ==
- Bronius, shortened form of the name
