= Branimir =

Slavic masculine given name

- Pronunciation: Serbo-Croatian pronunciation: [brǎnimir]
- Gender: masculine

Origin
- Language: Slavic
- Meaning: "the one who defends the world / peace"

Other names
- Short form: Branko
- Derived: borna (to protect, to defend) and miru (peace, world)
- Related names: Branislav, Bronislav, Bronisław

Branimir (Cyrillic: Бранимир) is a Slavic masculine given name. It is a combination of the Slavic elements borna ("to protect, to defend") and miru ("the world" or "peace" in Old Slavic), and hence means "the one who defends the world/peace". It is especially common in Croatia, Serbia, Bosnia and Herzegovina and Bulgaria. Feminine versions of the name are Branimira and Branimirka.

== Notable people with the name ==
- Branimir of Croatia (fl. 879–892), Croatian medieval ruler
- Branimir Aleksić (born 1990), Serbian footballer
- Branimir Altgayer (1897–1950/51), German minority leader in Yugoslavia
- Branimir Bajić (born 1979), Bosnian footballer
- Branimir Brstina (born 1960), Serbian actor
- Branimir Budetić (born 1990), Croatian Paralympic athlete
- Branimir Cipetić (born 1995), Croatian-Bosnian footballer
- Branimir Ćosić (1903–1934), Serbian writer and journalist
- Branimir Đokić (born 1950), Serbian folk accordionist
- Branimir Glavaš (born 1956), Croatian politician
- Branimir Grozdanov (born 1994), Bulgarian volleyball player
- Branimir Gvozdenović (born 1961), Montenegrin Serb politician
- Branimir Hrgota (born 1993), Bosnian-Swedish professional footballer
- Branimir Ivan Sikic (born, 1947), American medical doctor and scientist
- Branimir Jelić (born 1905), Croatian politician
- Branimir Jočić (born 1994), Serbian footballer
- Branimir Jovančićević (born 1962), Serbian politician and chemistry professor
- Branimir Jovanović (born 1979), Serbian politician
- Branimir Kalaica (born 1998), Croatian footballer
- Branimir Kostadinov (born 1989), Bulgarian footballer
- Branimir Kostić (born 1988), Serbian footballer
- Branimir Lokner, Serbian music critic and editor
- Branimir Makanec (born 1932), Croatian computer engineer
- Branimir Nestorović (born 1954), Serbian politician
- Branimir Petrović (born 1982), Serbian footballer
- Branimir Poljac (born 1984), Norwegian footballer
- Branimir Popov (born 1962), Bulgarian swimmer
- Branimir Popović (born 1967), Montenegrin actor and politician
- Branimir Porobić (1901–1952), Serbian footballer
- Branimir Rančić (born 1953), Serbian medical doctor and politician
- Branimir Savović (born 1953), Bosnian Serb politician
- Branimir Šćepanović (1937–2020), Serbian writer
- Branimir Šenoa (1879–1939), Croatian painter and art historian
- Branimir Spasić (born 1986), Serbian politician
- Branimir Štulić (born 1953), Yugoslav musician
- Branimir Subašić (born 1982), Azerbaijani-Serbian footballer
- Branimir Vujević (born 1974), Croatian rower
- Branimir Živojinović (1930–2007), Serbian poet and translator

== See also ==
- Branimir inscription, 9th-century Croatian inscription
- Veselin Branimirov (born 1975), Bulgarian football player and coach
- Branko
- Branislav
