= Bronisław =

Bronisław or Bronislaw may refer to:

== People ==
- Bronisław (given name), including a list of people with the name

== Places ==
- Bronisław, Greater Poland Voivodeship (west-central Poland)
- Bronisław, Radziejów County in Kuyavian-Pomeranian Voivodeship (north-central Poland)
- Bronisław, Mogilno County in Kuyavian-Pomeranian Voivodeship (north-central Poland)
- Bronisława, Greater Poland Voivodeship (west-central Poland)

== See also ==
- Bronislav, given name
- Branislav, given name
