= Bronisława =

Bronisława may refer to:

- Bronisława (given name), Polish feminine given name
- Bronisława, Greater Poland Voivodeship, village in Poland
