= Branislava =

Slavic feminine given name

- Gender: feminine

Origin
- Language: Slavic

Other names
- Derived: borna (to protect, to defend) and slava (glory, fame)
- Related names: Branislav (m), Bronislava, Bronisława

Branislava (Cyrillic: Бранислава) is a Slavic feminine given name, derived from the Slavic elements borna (to protect, to defend) and slava (glory, fame) and means "warrior", "defender of the glory". It is the feminine form of Branislav.

Notable people with the name include:

- Branislava Ilić (born 1970), Serbian playwright and actress
- Branislava Peruničić (1936–2025), Bosnian academic and university professor
- Branislava Sušnik (1920–1996), Slovenian-Paraguayan anthropologist
- Branislava Vičar (born 1975), Slovenian linguist and literature professor

== See also ==
- Branislav, male form of the name
- Bronisława (given name)
- Slavic names
