= Peruničić =

Peruničić is a surname. Notable people with the surname include:

- Branislava Peruničić (1936–2025), Bosnian academic
- Đorđo Peruničić (born 1993), Montenegrin handball player
- Nenad Peruničić (born 1971), Serbian handball coach and player
- Predrag Peruničić (born 1967), Serbian handball player
- Stefan Perunicic (born 1988), Serbian basketball player
