= Damjanov =

Damjanov is a surname. Notable people with the surname include:

- Branislav Damjanov (born 1965), Serbian politician
- Sava Damjanov (born 1956), Serbian writer
