= Szczerek =

Szczerek is a Polish surname. Archaic feminine forms are Szczerkowa (by husband), Szczerkówna (by father); they still can be used colloquially. Notable people with the surname include:

- Marian Szczerek (born 1950), Polish engineer, tribology specialist, professor
- Ziemowit Szczerek (born 1978), Polish journalist, writer, and translator

== See also ==
- Szczerkowo
