= Mąkolno =

Mąkolno may refer to the following places in Poland:

- Mąkolno, Lower Silesian Voivodeship (south-west Poland)
- Mąkolno, Greater Poland Voivodeship (west-central Poland)
