= Zakrzewek =

Zakrzewek may refer to the following places:

- Zakrzewek, Włocławek County in Kuyavian-Pomeranian Voivodeship (north-central Poland)
- Zakrzewek, Sępólno County in Kuyavian-Pomeranian Voivodeship (north-central Poland)
- Zakrzewek, Masovian Voivodeship (east-central Poland)
- Zakrzewek, Gmina Sompolno in Greater Poland Voivodeship (west-central Poland)
- Zakrzewek, Gmina Wierzbinek in Greater Poland Voivodeship (west-central Poland)
