= Klonowa =

Klonowa may refer to the following places:

- Klonowa, Greater Poland Voivodeship (west-central Poland)
- Klonowa, Łódź Voivodeship (central Poland)
- Klonowa, Masovian Voivodeship (east-central Poland)
