= Bronisława (given name) =

Polish female given name

- Pronunciation: Polish: [brɔ.ɲiˈswa.va]
- Gender: feminine
- Language: Polish

Origin
- Region of origin: Poland

Other names
- Related names: Bronisław (m), Bronislava, Branislava

Bronisława (Polish: [brɔ.ɲiˈswa.va]) is a Polish feminine given name, derived from the Slavic elements borna (to protect, to defend) and slava (glory, fame). It is the feminine form of Bronisław, the Polish variant of the Slavic name Bronislav.

Notable people with the name include:

- Bronisława Dłuska (1865–1939), Polish physician
- Bronisława Janowska (1868–1953), Polish painter
- Bronisława Kondratowicz (1854–1949 ), Polish photographer, folklorist
- Bronisława Kowalska (1955–2020), Polish politician
- Bronisława Ludwichowska (born 1951), Polish runner
- Bronisława Łukaszewicz (1885–1962), Polish-Lithuanian painter
- Bronisława Orawiec-Löffler (1929–2010), Polish activist and dentist
- Bronisława Wajs (1908–1987), Polish-Romani poet and singer
- Bronisława Wieniawa-Długoszowska (1886–1953), Polish wartime nurse

== See also ==
- Bronisław (given name), masculine form of the name
- Branislava
- Polish name
- Slavic names
