= Przystronie =

Przystronie may refer to the following places in Poland:

- Przystronie, Lower Silesian Voivodeship (south-west Poland)
- Przystronie, Greater Poland Voivodeship (west-central Poland)
