= Ferens =

Ferens is a surname. Notable people with the surname include:

- Bronisław Ferens (1912–1991), Polish zoologist and ornithologist
- Stan Ferens (1915–1994), American baseball player
- Thomas Ferens (1847–1930), British politician, philanthropist, and industrialist
- Wojciech Ferens (born 1991), Polish volleyball player

Thomas Ferens was the inaugural benefactor of the Ferens Art Gallery.

== See also ==
- Ryś-Ferens
