= Koszary =

Koszary may refer to the following places:

- Koszary, Lesser Poland Voivodeship (south Poland)
- Koszary, Nisko County in Subcarpathian Voivodeship (south-east Poland)
- Koszary, Sanok County in Subcarpathian Voivodeship (south-east Poland)
- Koszary, Radom County in Masovian Voivodeship (east-central Poland)
- Koszary, Zwoleń County in Masovian Voivodeship (east-central Poland)
- Koszary, Greater Poland Voivodeship (west-central Poland)
- Koszary, Pomeranian Voivodeship (north Poland)
