= Lubstówek, Greater Poland Voivodeship =

Lubstówek
- Village
- Location within Poland
- Coordinates: 52°20′8″N 18°26′23″E
- Country: Poland
- Voivodeship: Greater Poland
- County: Konin
- Gmina: Sompolno

Lubstówek [lupsˈtuvɛk] is a village in the administrative district of Gmina Sompolno, within Konin County, Greater Poland Voivodeship, in west-central Poland.
