= Marianowo, Gmina Sompolno =

Marianowo
- Village
- Location within Poland
- Coordinates: 52°19′23″N 18°27′54″E
- Country: Poland
- Voivodeship: Greater Poland
- County: Konin
- Gmina: Sompolno

Marianowo [marjaˈnɔvɔ] is a village in the administrative district of Gmina Sompolno, within Konin County, Greater Poland Voivodeship, in west-central Poland.
