= Kazubek, Gmina Sompolno =

Kazubek
- Village
- Location within Poland
- Coordinates: 52°18′50″N 18°32′45″E
- Country: Poland
- Voivodeship: Greater Poland
- County: Konin
- Gmina: Sompolno

Kazubek [kaˈzubɛk] is a village in the administrative district of Gmina Sompolno, within Konin County, Greater Poland Voivodeship, in west-central Poland.
