= Kolonia Lipiny =

- Village
- Location within Poland
- Coordinates: 52°19′30″N 18°35′05″E
- Country: Poland
- Voivodeship: Greater Poland
- County: Konin
- Gmina: Sompolno

Kolonia Lipiny [kɔˈlɔɲa liˈpinɨ] is a village in the administrative district of Gmina Sompolno, within Konin County, Greater Poland Voivodeship, in west-central Poland.
