= Ośno Dolne =

- Village
- Location within Poland
- Coordinates: 52°23′40″N 18°36′6″E
- Country: Poland
- Voivodeship: Greater Poland
- County: Konin
- Gmina: Sompolno
- Population: 110

Ośno Dolne [ˈɔɕnɔ ˈdɔlnɛ] is a village in the administrative district of Gmina Sompolno, within Konin County, Greater Poland Voivodeship, in west-central Poland.
