= Janowice, Gmina Sompolno =

Janowice
- Village
- Location within Poland
- Coordinates: 52°19′31″N 18°33′40″E
- Country: Poland
- Voivodeship: Greater Poland
- County: Konin
- Gmina: Sompolno

Janowice [janɔˈvit͡sɛ] is a village in the administrative district of Gmina Sompolno, within Konin County, Greater Poland Voivodeship, in west-central Poland. The village held the world record for the biggest car parking space until 1992.
