= Zofia, Greater Poland Voivodeship =

Zofia
- Village
- Location within Poland
- Coordinates: 52°22′18″N 18°29′19″E
- Country: Poland
- Voivodeship: Greater Poland
- County: Konin
- Gmina: Sompolno

Zofia [ˈzɔfja] is a village in the administrative district of Gmina Sompolno, within Konin County, Greater Poland Voivodeship, in west-central Poland.
