= Siedliska, Konin County =

Siedliska
- Village
- Location within Poland
- Coordinates: 52°20′35″N 18°34′38″E
- Country: Poland
- Voivodeship: Greater Poland
- County: Konin
- Gmina: Sompolno
- Population: 110

Siedliska [ɕɛdˈlʲiska] is a village in the administrative district of Gmina Sompolno, within Konin County, Greater Poland Voivodeship, in west-central Poland.
