= Bronislava =

Slavic feminine given name

- Gender: feminine

Origin
- Language: Slavic

Other names
- Derived: borna (to protect, to defend) and slava (glory, fame)
- Related names: Bronislav (m), Branislava, Bronisława

Bronislava (Cyrillic: Бронислава) is a Slavic feminine given name, derived from the Slavic elements borna (to protect, to defend) and slava (glory, fame) and means "warrior", "defender of the glory". It is the feminine form of Bronislav.

Notable people with the name include:

- Bronislava Dobiášová (born 1998), Slovak figure skater
- Bronislava Kerbelytė (1935–2024), Lithuanian folklorist and professor
- Bronislava Nijinska (1891–1972), Russian ballet dancer and choreographer
- Bronislava of Poland (c. 1204–1259), Polish nun of the Premonstratensian Order
- Bronislava Poskrebysheva (1910–1941), Russian physician and Soviet figure
- Bronislava Volková (1946–2026), Czech-American poet and translator
