= Wroczewo =

- Village
- Location within Poland
- Coordinates: 52°20′N 18°34′E
- Country: Poland
- Voivodeship: Greater Poland
- County: Konin
- Gmina: Sompolno

Wroczewo [vrɔˈt͡ʂɛvɔ] is a village in the administrative district of Gmina Sompolno, within Konin County, Greater Poland Voivodeship, in west-central Poland.
