= Sompolno =

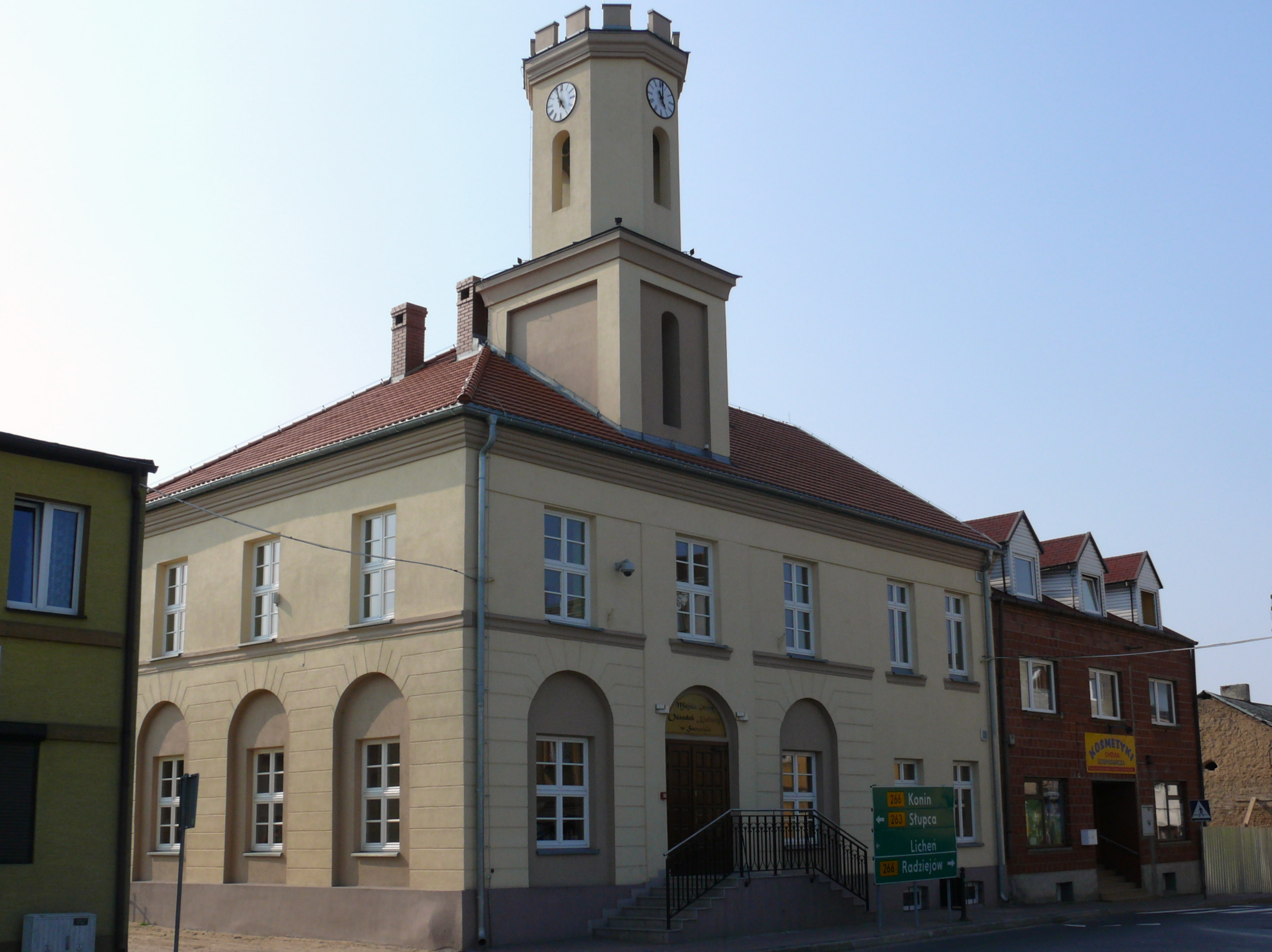
- Town Hall

- Coat of arms

- Location within Poland
- Coordinates: 52°24′40″N 18°30′10″E
- Country: Poland
- Voivodeship: Greater Poland
- County: Konin
- Gmina: Sompolno

Area
  - Total: 6.21 km^{2} (2.40 sq mi)

Population (2016)
  - Total: 3,614
  - Density: 582/km^{2} (1,510/sq mi)
- Time zone: UTC+1 (CET)
  - Summer (DST): UTC+2 (CEST)
- Postal code: 62-610
- Vehicle registration: PKN
- Website: http://www.sompolno.pl

Sompolno [sɔmˈpɔlnɔ] is a town in Konin County, Greater Poland Voivodeship, in central Poland, with 3,614 inhabitants (2016).

== History ==
In the 10th century, the area became part of the emerging Polish state under its first historic ruler Mieszko I. In 1242, Duke Casimir I of Kuyavia from the Piast dynasty stayed in Sompolno, and issued a privilege for the Sulejów Abbey there. Sompolno was granted town rights in 1477. It was a royal town, administratively located in the Brześć Kujawski Voivodeship in the Greater Poland Province of the Kingdom of Poland. A route connecting Warsaw with Poznań and Dresden ran through the town in the 18th century and King Augustus III of Poland often traveled that route.

During the German occupation of Poland (World War II), Sompolno was renamed to Deutscheck between 1939 and 1943 and then later to Deutscheneck between 1943 and 1945 in an attempt to erase traces of Polish origin.

== Sports ==
The local football club is GKS Sompolno. It competes in the lower leagues.

== Gallery ==
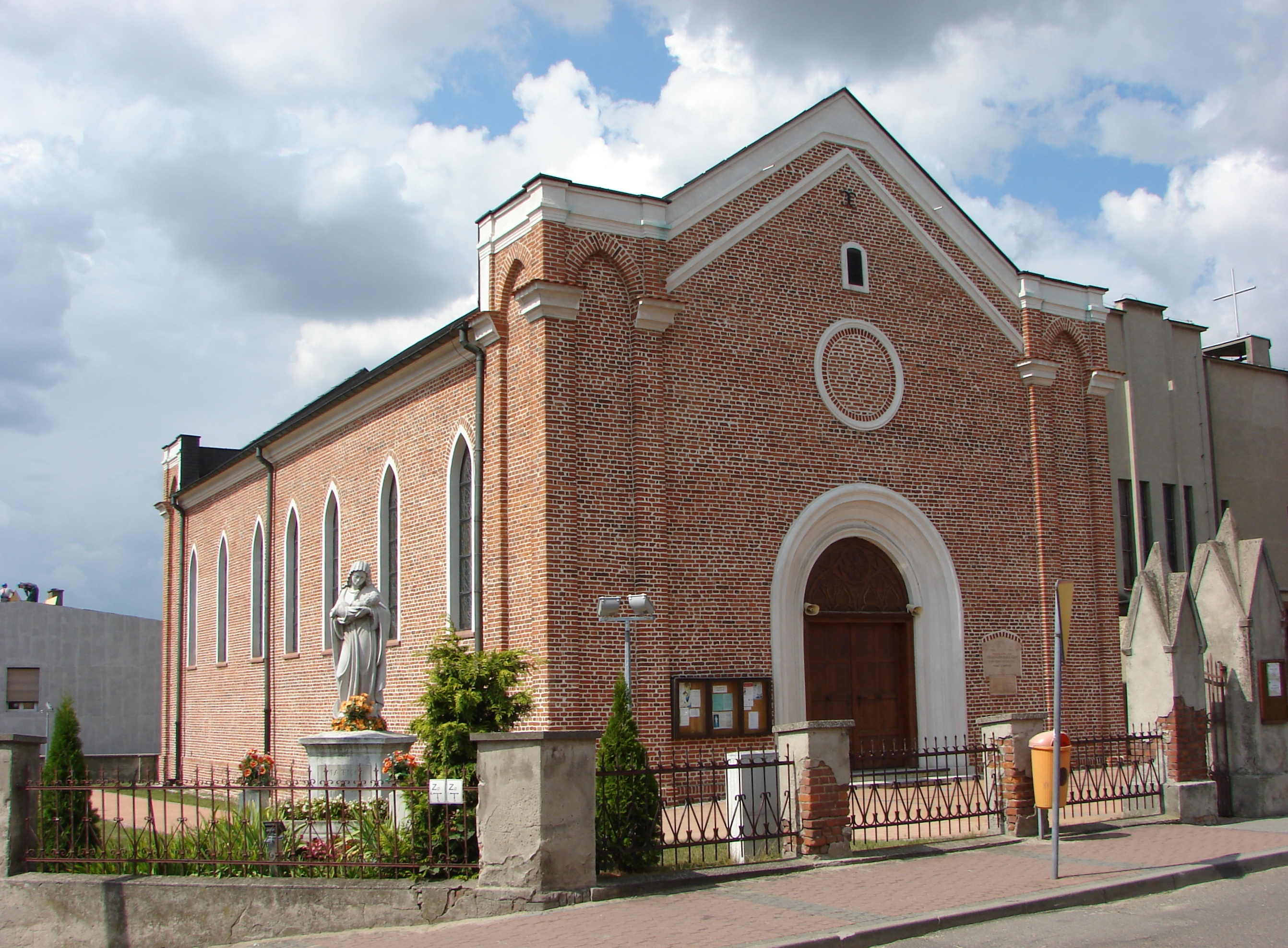
Church of St. Mary Magdalene

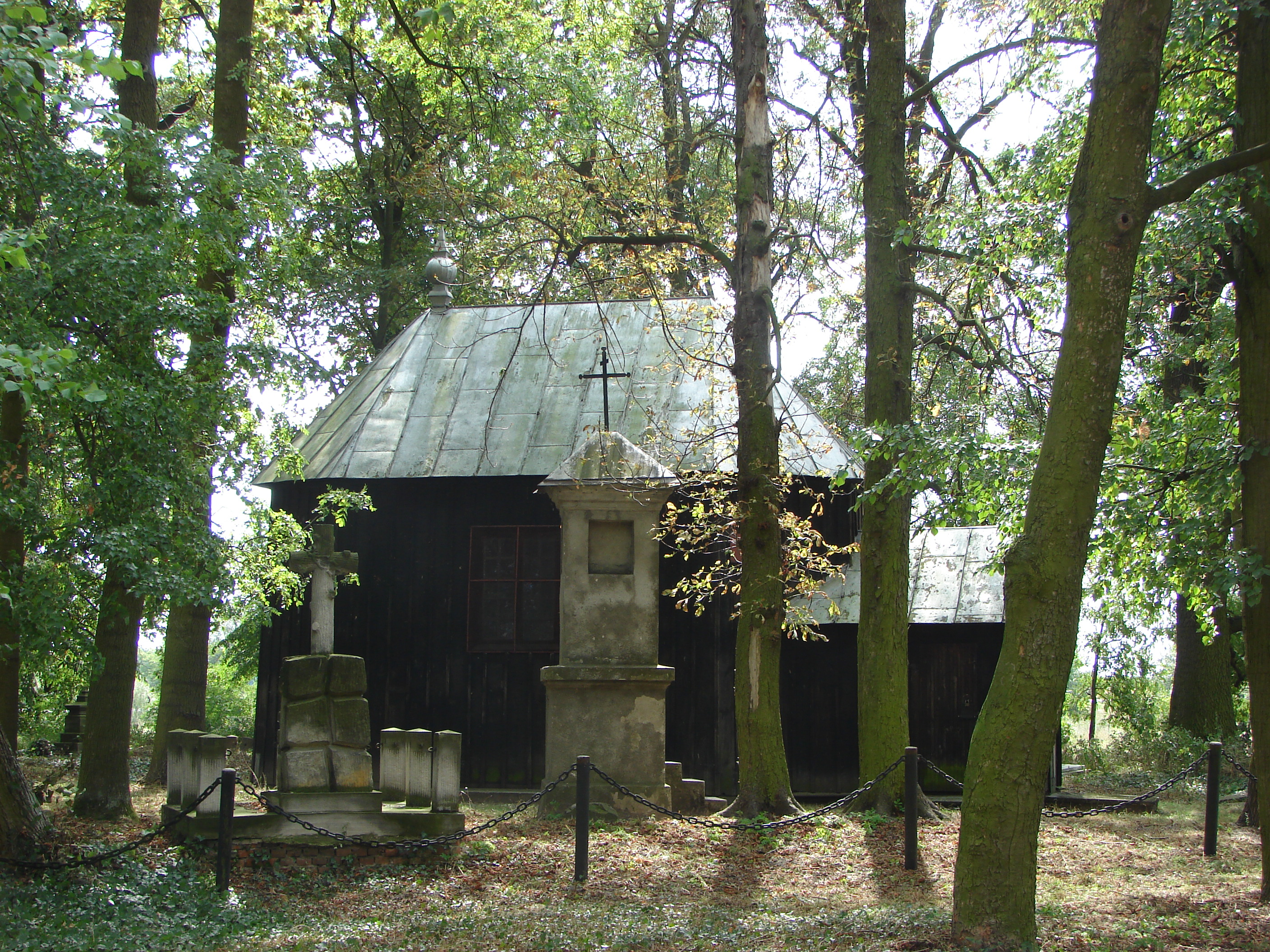
Saint Jerome chapel, 17th century

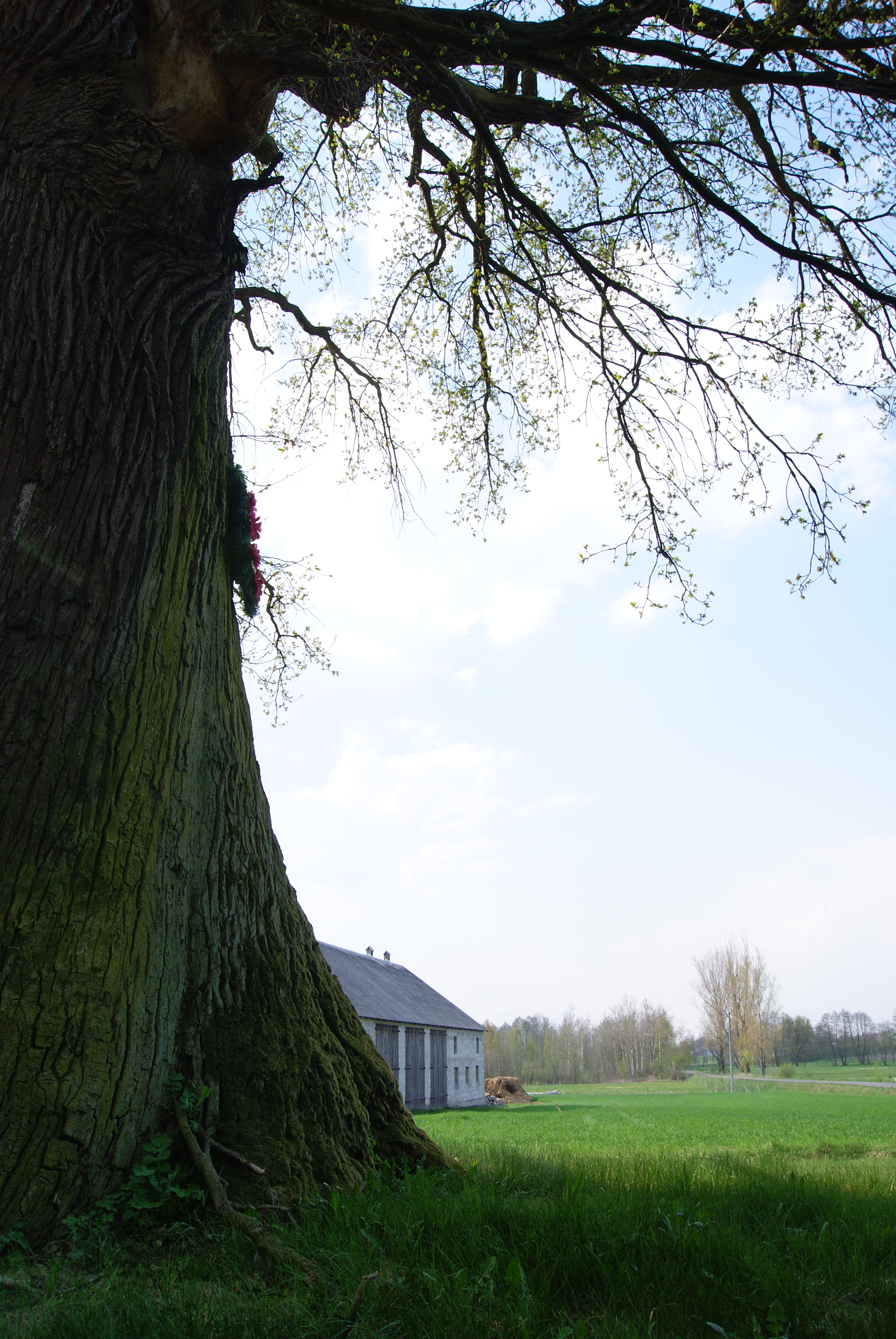
Heritage tree Sorbus torminalis

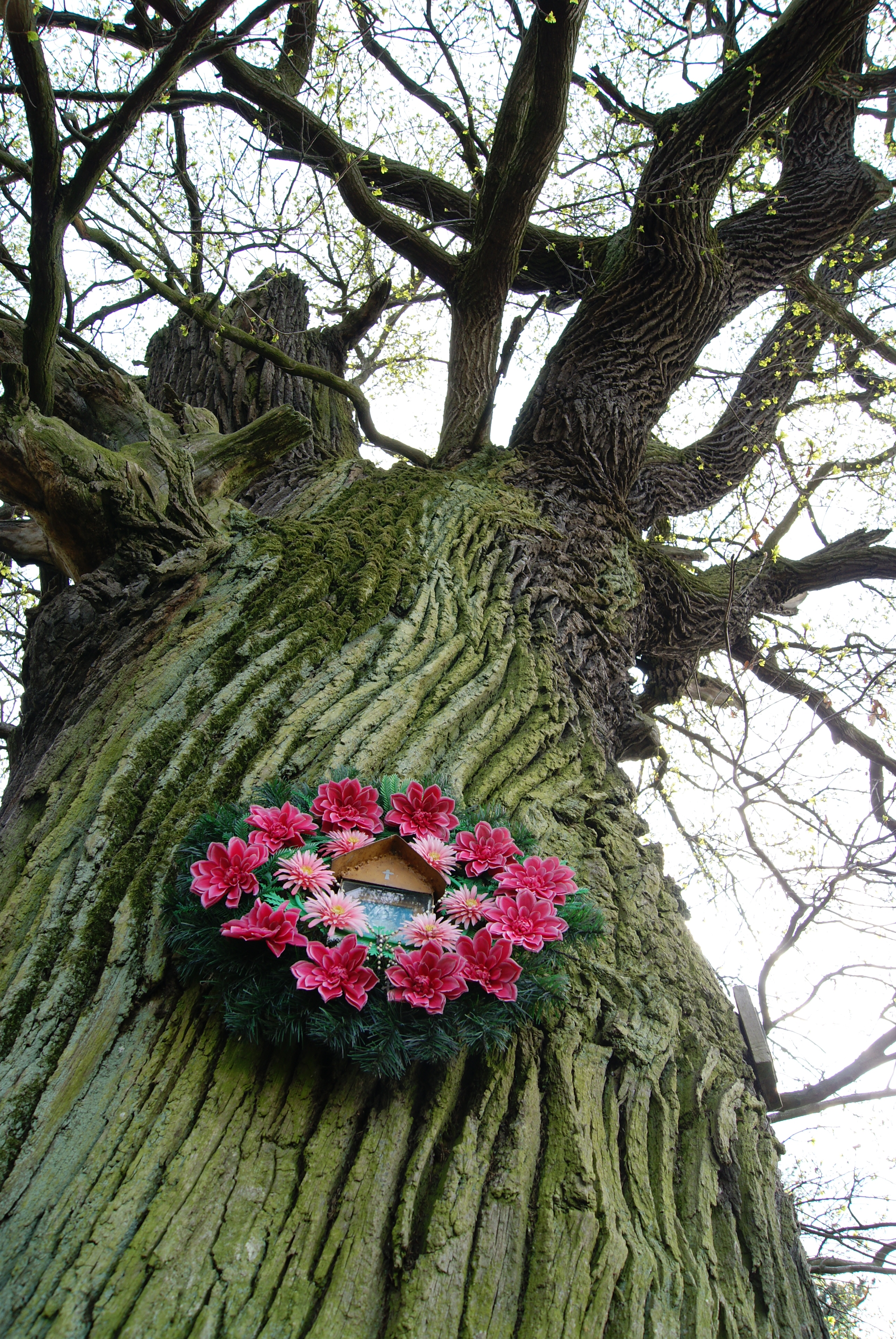
Heritage tree
