= Grądy, Konin County =

Grądy
- Village
- Location within Poland
- Coordinates: 52°19′35″N 18°31′09″E
- Country: Poland
- Voivodeship: Greater Poland
- County: Konin
- Gmina: Sompolno

Grądy [ˈɡrɔndɨ] is a village in the administrative district of Gmina Sompolno, within Konin County, Greater Poland Voivodeship, in west-central Poland.
