= Nadjezioro =

- Village
- Location within Poland
- Coordinates: 52°22′30″N 18°30′56″E
- Country: Poland
- Voivodeship: Greater Poland
- County: Konin
- Gmina: Sompolno

Nadjezioro [nadjɛˈʑɔrɔ] is a village in the administrative district of Gmina Sompolno, within Konin County, Greater Poland Voivodeship, in west-central Poland.
