= Lok, Levice District =

Village and municipality in Slovakia

Lok Garamlök
- Municipality
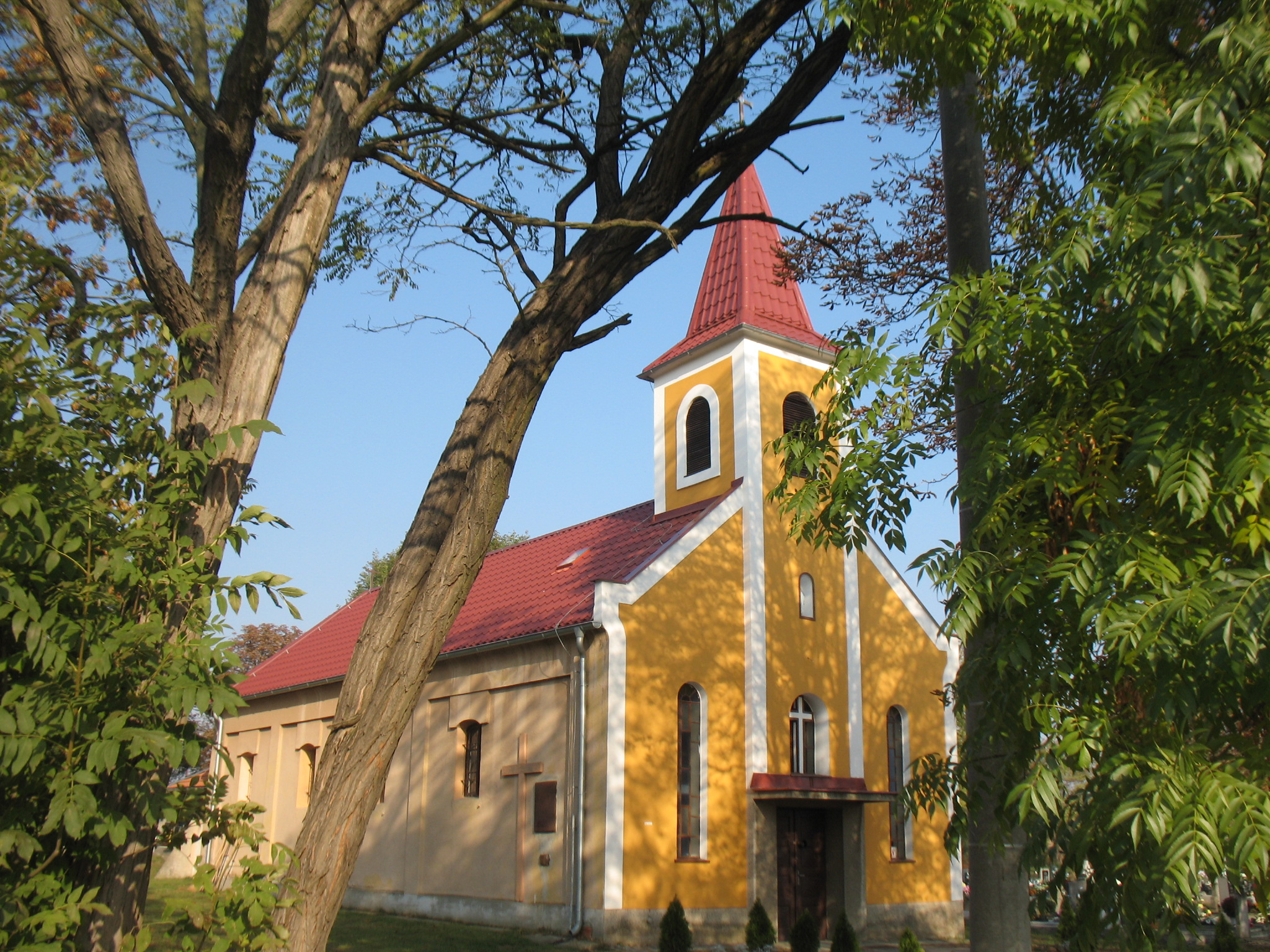
- All Saints church, Lok

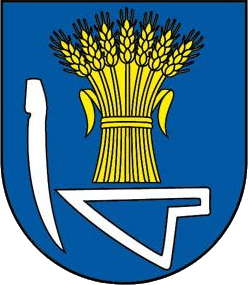
- Flag Coat of arms

- Location of Lok in the Nitra Region Location of Lok in Slovakia
- Coordinates: 48°11′N 18°28′E
- Country: Slovakia
- Region: Nitra Region
- District: Levice District
- First mentioned: 1286

Area
  - Total: 17.19 km^{2} (6.64 sq mi)
- Elevation: 179 m (587 ft)

Population (2025)
  - Total: 1,066
- Time zone: UTC+1 (CET)
  - Summer (DST): UTC+2 (CEST)
- Postal code: 935 38
- Area code: +421 36
- Vehicle registration plate (until 2022): LV
- Website: www.lok.sk

Lok (Hungarian: Garamlök) is a village and municipality in the Levice District in the Nitra Region of Slovakia.

== History ==
In historical records the village was first mentioned in 1286.

== Geography ==
The municipality lies at an altitude of 179 metres (587 ft) and covers an area of 17.19 km^{2} (6.64 sq mi) (2025).

== Population ==
Population statistic (10 years)
| Year | 1995 | 2005 | 2015 | 2025 |
|---|---|---|---|---|
| Count | 1012 | 969 | 945 | 1066 |
| Difference | | −4.24% | −2.47% | +12.80% |

Population statistic
| Year | 2024 | 2025 |
|---|---|---|
| Count | 1072 | 1066 |
| Difference | | −0.55% |

It has a population of 1066 people (31 December 2025).

=== Ethnicity ===
Census 2021 (1+ %)
| Ethnicity | Number | Fraction |
|---|---|---|
| Slovak | 857 | 79.86% |
| Not found out | 130 | 12.11% |
| Hungarian | 104 | 9.69% |
| Total | 1073 | |

In year 2021 was 1073 people by ethnicity 857 as Slovak, 130 as Not found out, 104 as Hungarian, 6 as Romani, 5 as Czech, 2 as Serbian, 2 as Austrian, 2 as Albanian, 1 as Russian and 1 as German.

Note on population: The difference values of population numbers in the table "Population statistic" and in the sections "Ethnicity" & "Religion" is caused by the use of various statistical methods.

=== Religion ===
Census 2021 (1+ %)
| Religion | Number | Fraction |
|---|---|---|
| Roman Catholic Church | 494 | 46.04% |
| None | 283 | 26.37% |
| Not found out | 148 | 13.79% |
| Evangelical Church | 75 | 6.99% |
| Calvinist Church | 45 | 4.19% |
| Total | 1073 | |

In year 2021 was 1073 people by religion 494 from Roman Catholic Church, 283 from None, 148 from Not found out, 75 from Evangelical Church, 45 from Calvinist Church, 9 from Greek Catholic Church, 7 from Jehovah's Witnesses, 4 from Christian Congregations in Slovakia, 2 from United Methodist Church, 2 from Church of the Brethren, 1 from Eastern Orthodox Church, 1 from Other, 1 from Czechoslovak Hussite Church and 1 from Buddhism.

== Facilities ==
The village has a public library and football pitch.

== Notable residents ==
Branislav Tvarožek (born 1925), Slovak National Uprising participant and political prisoner.
