= Młynek, Konin County =

Młynek
- Village
- Location within Poland
- Coordinates: 52°20′11″N 18°29′16″E
- Country: Poland
- Voivodeship: Greater Poland
- County: Konin
- Gmina: Sompolno
- Population: 38

Młynek [ˈmwɨnɛk] is a village in the administrative district of Gmina Sompolno, within Konin County, Greater Poland Voivodeship, in west-central Poland.
