= Stefanowo, Gmina Sompolno =

Stefanowo
- Village
- Location within Poland
- Coordinates: 52°19′29″N 18°24′52″E
- Country: Poland
- Voivodeship: Greater Poland
- County: Konin
- Gmina: Sompolno

Stefanowo [stɛfaˈnɔvɔ] is a village in the administrative district of Gmina Sompolno, within Konin County, Greater Poland Voivodeship, in west-central Poland.
