= Mostki, Konin County =

Mostki
- Village
- Location within Poland
- Coordinates: 52°22′N 18°35′E
- Country: Poland
- Voivodeship: Greater Poland
- County: Konin
- Gmina: Sompolno

Mostki [ˈmɔstki] is a village in the administrative district of Gmina Sompolno, within Konin County, Greater Poland Voivodeship, in west-central Poland.
