= Gmina Sompolno =

Gmina Sompolno Sompolno Commune
- Gmina
- Coat of arms

- Coordinates (Sompolno): 52°24′40″N 18°30′10″E
- Country: Poland
- Voivodeship: Greater Poland
- County: Konin County
- Seat: Sompolno

Area
  - Total: 137.36 km^{2} (53.03 sq mi)

Population (2006)
  - Total: 10,530
  - Density: 76.66/km^{2} (198.5/sq mi)
  - Urban: 3,695
  - Rural: 6,835
- Website: http://www.sompolno.pl

Gmina Sompolno is an urban-rural gmina (administrative district) in Konin County, Greater Poland Voivodeship, in west-central Poland. Its seat is the town of Sompolno, which lies approximately 27 kilometres (17 mi) north-east of Konin and 108 km (67 mi) east of the regional capital Poznań.

The gmina covers an area of 137.36 square kilometres (53.0 sq mi), and as of 2006 its total population is 10,530 (of which the population of Sompolno amounts to 3,695, and the population of the rural part of the gmina is 6,835).

== Villages ==
Apart from the town of Sompolno, Gmina Sompolno contains the villages and settlements of Bagno, Belny, Biele, Błonawy, Bronisława, Czamża, Dąbrowa, Grądy, Janowice, Jaźwiny, Jesionka, Kazubek, Klonowa, Kolonia Lipiny, Kolonia Wierzbie, Koszary, Łagiewniki, Lubstów, Lubstówek, Mąkolno, Marcinkowo, Marcjanki, Marianowo, Młynek, Mostki, Nadjezioro, Nowa Wieś, Olszewo, Ośno Dolne, Ośno Górne, Ośno Podleśne, Ostrówek, Paprocin, Piaski, Płoszewo, Police, Przystronie, Racięcice, Radowo, Romanowo, Ryn, Siedliska, Smolarnia, Smólniki Mostkowskie, Sompolinek, Spólnik, Stefanowo, Suszewy, Sycewo, Szczerkowo, Wierzbie, Wroczewo, Wymysłowo, Zakrzewek, Zdrojki and Zofia.

== Neighbouring gminas ==
Gmina Sompolno is bordered by the gminas of Babiak, Kramsk, Osiek Mały, Ślesin and Wierzbinek.

== Lakes ==
- Jezioro Lubstowskie, 87,2 ha, depth 7,0 m
- Mąkolno (Mąkoleńskie), 84 ha
- Mostki, 28 ha
- Szczekawa, 17 ha
