= Zdrojki, Greater Poland Voivodeship =

Zdrojki
- Village
- Location within Poland
- Coordinates: 52°19′05″N 18°33′38″E
- Country: Poland
- Voivodeship: Greater Poland
- County: Konin
- Gmina: Sompolno

Zdrojki [ˈzdrɔi̯ki] is a village in the administrative district of Gmina Sompolno, within Konin County, Greater Poland Voivodeship, in west-central Poland.
