= Ryn, Greater Poland Voivodeship =

Ryn
- Village
- Location within Poland
- Coordinates: 52°24′58″N 18°35′02″E
- Country: Poland
- Voivodeship: Greater Poland
- County: Konin
- Gmina: Sompolno

Ryn [rɨn] is a village in the administrative district of Gmina Sompolno, within Konin County, Greater Poland Voivodeship, in west-central Poland.
