= Ośno Podleśne =

- Village
- Location within Poland
- Coordinates: 52°24′12″N 18°34′20″E
- Country: Poland
- Voivodeship: Greater Poland
- County: Konin
- Gmina: Sompolno
- Population: 150

Ośno Podleśne [ˈɔɕnɔ pɔdˈlɛɕnɛ] is a village in the administrative district of Gmina Sompolno, within Konin County, Greater Poland Voivodeship, in west-central Poland.
