= Risto Komnenović =

Serbian politician

Risto Komnenović (Serbian Cyrillic: Ристо Комненовић; born 17 August 1953) is a Serbian politician. He served in the Vojvodina provincial assembly from 1992 to 2000 as a member of the Socialist Party of Serbia (SPS).

== Private career ==
Komnenović is a medical doctor. During his political career, he lived in the village of Vojvoda Stepa in Nova Crnja.

== Politician ==
=== Provincial representative ===
Vojvodina;s first provincial election following the restoration of multi-party democracy took place in May 1992. Komnenović ran as the Socialist Party's candidate for the Nova Crnja division and was one of twenty-one candidates elected in the first round of voting. The SPS won a majority victory overall, and Komnenović supported the provincial government in the assembly. He was re-elected in the repeat election of December 1992, which was again won by the SPS.

Komnenović was elected for a third term in the 1996 provincial election, defeating candidates from the Zajedno coalition and the Serbian Radical Party (SRS). The Socialist Party won a third consecutive victory, and he remained a government supporter.

=== Since 2000 ===
From 1990 to 2000, Serbian political life was dominated by the authoritarian rule of SPS leader Slobodan Milošević. Milošević was defeated in the 2000 Yugoslavian presidential election and subsequently fell from power after mass protests. The SPS also experienced a massive defeat in the 2000 Vojvodina provincial election, which was held concurrently with the presidential vote. Komnenović was not re-elected in Nova Crnja; available online sources do not clarify if he was a candidate.

Komnenović sought re-election to the provincial assembly in the 2004 provincial election and was defeated in the second round of voting. He also appeared in the second position on the SPS's electoral list for Nova Crnja in the concurrent 2004 Serbian local elections and was not elected when the list won only a single mandate.

He ran for the Nova Crnja division again in the 2008 Vojvodina provincial election and was again defeated in the second round. He was later a nominal candidate for the SPS in the 2012 local elections, appearing in the sixteenth position on the party's list in Nova Crnja. The party won four seats, and he was not elected.

== Electoral record ==
=== Provincial (Vojvodina) ===
2008 Vojvodina provincial election: Nova Crnja
Candidate	Party	First round		Second round	
Candidate	Party	Votes	%	Votes	%
Branislav Damjanov	For a European Vojvodina Democratic Party–G17 Plus Boris Tadić (Affiliation: Democratic Party)	1,652	25.89	2,754	57.69
Risto Komnenović	Socialist Party of Serbia (SPS), Party of United Pensioners of Serbia (PUPS) (Affiliation: Socialist Party of Serbia)	1,211	18.98	2,020	42.31
Dragiša Latinović	Christian Democratic Party of Serbia	1,187	18.61		
Milenko Vujović	Serbian Radical Party	1,017	15.94		
Attila Juhász	Hungarian Coalition–István Pásztor (Affiliation: Alliance of Vojvodina Hungarians)	921	14.44		
Emilija Putnik	Democratic Party of Serbia–New Serbia Dr. Vojislav Koštunica (Affiliation: Democratic Party of Serbia)	392	6.14		
Total		6,380	100.00	4,774	100.00
Valid votes		6,380	96.36	4,774	97.87
Invalid/blank votes		241	3.64	104	2.13
Total votes		6,621	100.00	4,878	100.00

2004 Vojvodina provincial election: Nova Crnja
Candidate	Party	First round		Second round	
Candidate	Party	Votes	%	Votes	%
Milan Micić (incumbent)	"Democratic Party–Boris Tadić"	1,338	31.69	2,083	53.36
Dr. Risto Komnenović	Socialist Party of Serbia	930	22.03	1,821	46.64
Siniša Škuletić	Serbian Radical Party–Tomislav Nikolić	549	13.00		
Milan Ninković	Strength of Serbia Movement–Bogoljub Karić	464	10.99		
Ivan Števin	G17 Plus–Miroljub Labus	423	10.02		
Radovan Lončarski	Democratic Party of Serbia	325	7.70		
Petar Lakić	New Serbia–Velimir Ilić	193	4.57		
Total		4,222	100.00	3,904	100.00
Valid votes		4,222	93.04	3,904	94.46
Invalid/blank votes		316	6.96	229	5.54
Total votes		4,538	100.00	4,133	100.00

1996 Vojvodina provincial election: Nova Crnja
Candidate	Party	Votes	%
Risto Komnenović (incumbent)	Socialist Party of Serbia		elected in the second round
Ilija Perišić	Serbian Radical Party		defeated in the second round
Danica Vučurević Đukin	Zajedno (Coalition Together)		defeated in the second round
Ivanka Todorov	Yugoslav Left		defeated in the first round
Total			
Source: Perišić and Vučurević Đukin are listed alphabetically.

December 1992 Vojvodina provincial election: Nova Crnja
Candidate	Party
Risto Komnenović (incumbent) (ELECTED)	Socialist Party of Serbia
Mile Jelovac	Democratic Party
Total

May 1992 Vojvodina provincial election: Nova Crnja
Candidate	Party
Risto Komnenović (ELECTED, FIRST ROUND)	Socialist Party of Serbia
other candidates	
Total
