= Jesionka, Greater Poland Voivodeship =

Jesionka
- Village
- Location within Poland
- Coordinates: 52°18′32″N 18°27′32″E
- Country: Poland
- Voivodeship: Greater Poland
- County: Konin
- Gmina: Sompolno
- Population: 160

Jesionka [jɛˈɕɔnka] is a village in the administrative district of Gmina Sompolno, within Konin County, Greater Poland Voivodeship, in west-central Poland.
