= Biele, Gmina Sompolno =

Biele
- Village
- Location within Poland
- Coordinates: 52°21′50″N 18°30′40″E
- Country: Poland
- Voivodeship: Greater Poland
- County: Konin
- Gmina: Sompolno

Biele [ˈbjɛlɛ] is a village in the administrative district of Gmina Sompolno, within Konin County, Greater Poland Voivodeship, in west-central Poland.
