= Dąbrowa, Konin County =

Dąbrowa
- Village
- Location within Poland
- Coordinates: 52°23′5″N 18°29′17″E
- Country: Poland
- Voivodeship: Greater Poland
- County: Konin
- Gmina: Sompolno
- Population: 80

Dąbrowa [dɔmˈbrɔva] is a village in the administrative district of Gmina Sompolno, within Konin County, Greater Poland Voivodeship, in west-central Poland.
