= Smolarnia, Konin County =

Smolarnia
- Village
- Location within Poland
- Coordinates: 52°20′19″N 18°35′35″E
- Country: Poland
- Voivodeship: Greater Poland
- County: Konin
- Gmina: Sompolno
- Time zone: UTC+1 (CET)
  - Summer (DST): UTC+2 (CEST)

Smolarnia [smɔˈlarɲa] is a village in the administrative district of Gmina Sompolno, within Konin County, Greater Poland Voivodeship, in central Poland.
