= Radowo, Greater Poland Voivodeship =

Radowo
- Village
- Location within Poland
- Coordinates: 52°20′03″N 18°35′03″E
- Country: Poland
- Voivodeship: Greater Poland
- County: Konin
- Gmina: Sompolno

Radowo [raˈdɔvɔ] is a village in the administrative district of Gmina Sompolno, within Konin County, Greater Poland Voivodeship, in west-central Poland.
