= Ostrówek, Gmina Sompolno =

Ostrówek
- Village
- Location within Poland
- Coordinates: 52°19′10″N 18°32′24″E
- Country: Poland
- Voivodeship: Greater Poland
- County: Konin
- Gmina: Sompolno

Population
  - Total: 190
- Time zone: UTC+1 (CET)
  - Summer (DST): UTC+2 (CEST)

Ostrówek [ɔsˈtruvɛk] is a village in the administrative district of Gmina Sompolno, within Konin County, Greater Poland Voivodeship, in central Poland.
