= Attila Juhász (born 1976) =

Serbian politician and administrator

- Juhász Attila

Member of the National Assembly of the Republic of Serbia
- In office 3 August 2020 – 30 November 2020

Member of the Assembly of Vojvodina
- In office 22 June 2012 – 22 May 2014

Personal details
- Born: 18 February 1976 (age 50) Zrenjanin, SAP Vojvodina, SR Serbia, SFR Yugoslavia
- Party: VMSZ

Attila Juhász (Serbian Cyrillic: Атила Јухас, romanized: Atila Juhas; born 18 February 1976) is a Serbian politician and administrator from the country's Hungarian community. He has been a state secretary in Serbia's agriculture ministry since 2014 and has also served in the Serbian national assembly and the Vojvodina provincial assembly. Juhász is a member of the Alliance of Vojvodina Hungarians (VMSZ).

== Early life and career ==
Juhász was born in Zrenjanin, in what was then the Socialist Autonomous Province of Vojvodina in the Socialist Republic of Serbia, Socialist Federal Republic of Yugoslavia. He was raised in nearby Nova Crnja, completed high school in Zrenjanin, and ultimately earned a master's degree in agricultural engineering from the University of Belgrade Faculty of Agriculture in Zemun. From 2003 to 2005, he was employed by the United Nations Food and Agriculture Organization (FAO), where he worked in agricultural production in Serbia. He has also been a Balkan regional employee for the Vegetable Production Research Institute in Kecskemét, Hungary. He lives in Nova Crnja.

== Politician ==
=== Early years (2006–12) ===
Juhász joined the VMSZ in 2006. He appeared in the forty-ninth position on the party's electoral list in the 2007 Serbian parliamentary election; the VMSZ won three seats, and he was not included in its assembly delegation. (From 2000 to 2011, Serbian parliamentary mandates were awarded to sponsoring parties or coalitions rather than individual candidates, and it was common practice for the mandates to be assigned out of numerical order. Juhász could have been given an assembly seat despite his low position on the list, but this did not occur.)

In 2008, the VMSZ led a temporary alliance of parties known as the Hungarian Coalition (MK). Juhász received the 198th position on the alliance's list in the 2008 parliamentary election and was again not included in his party's delegation when the list won four seats. He was also the Hungarian Coalition's candidate in Nova Crnja for the 2008 Vojvodina provincial election, which was held under a system of mixed proportional representation, and was defeated in the first round of voting.

Juhász led the Hungarian Coalition's list in Nova Crnja for the 2008 Serbian local elections, which took place concurrently with the parliamentary and provincial votes, and received a mandate in the local assembly after the list won three out of twenty-five seats. He was appointed to the board of directors of the Đura Jakšić school and served on an expert commission for the protection, development, and use of agricultural land in the municipality.

Serbia's electoral system was reformed in 2011, such that all parliamentary mandates were assigned to candidates on successful lists in numerical order.

=== Provincial representative (2012–14) ===
Juhász appeared in the fourth position on the VMSZ's electoral list in the 2012 Vojvodina provincial election and was elected when the party won four proportional mandates. The Democratic Party (DS) won the election and afterward formed a new coalition government that included the VMSZ; Juhász was a government supporter in the provincial assembly and a member of the committee on agriculture.

=== State secretary and parliamentarian (2014–present) ===
The VMSZ began supporting Serbia's government led by the Serbian Progressive Party (SNS) after the 2014 parliamentary election, and Juhász received an appointment as a state secretary in Serbia's ministry of agriculture and environmental protection in the same year. As he could not hold a dual mandate, he resigned his seat in the provincial assembly on 22 May 2014.

Juhász led the VMSZ's list for Nova Crnja in the 2016 local elections and was elected when the list won two seats. He resigned his seat on 18 August 2016. He continued to serve as a state secretary and remained in the agriculture ministry after June 2017 when it was restructured as the ministry of agriculture, forestry, and water management.

Juhász appeared in the seventh position on the VMSZ's list in the 2020 parliamentary election and was elected to the national assembly when the list won a record nine seats. He resigned his seat on 30 November 2020 in order to continue serving as a state secretary. He also led the VMSZ list for Nova Crnja in the 2020 local elections, was elected when the list won two seats, and resigned from the local assembly on 21 August 2020.

The newspaper Danas ran an article in June 2021 noting that, due to his various supplementary incomes, Juhász was receiving considerably more money from the state treasury than Branislav Nedimović, his supervisor as the minister of agriculture.

Juhász was re-appointed as a state secretary again after the 2022 parliamentary election, he which he was not a candidate. In the 2023 parliamentary election, Juhász appeared in the twelfth position on the VMSZ list. The list won six seats, and he was not elected; he was appointed to a sixth consecutive term as a state secretary in May 2024.

Juhász was a nominal VMSZ candidate for the 2024 Serbian local elections in Nova Crnja, appearing in the twelfth position on its list. He was not elected when the party won two seats.

He is a member of the VMSZ presidency and the party's management committee.

== Electoral record ==
=== Provincial (Vojvodina) ===
2008 Vojvodina provincial election: Nova Crnja
Candidate	Party	First round		Second round	
Candidate	Party	Votes	%	Votes	%
Branislav Damjanov	For a European Vojvodina Democratic Party–G17 Plus Boris Tadić (Affiliation: Democratic Party)	1,652	25.89	2,754	57.69
Risto Komnenović	Socialist Party of Serbia (SPS), Party of United Pensioners of Serbia (PUPS) (Affiliation: Socialist Party of Serbia)	1,211	18.98	2,020	42.31
Dragiša Latinović	Christian Democratic Party of Serbia	1,187	18.61		
Milenko Vujović	Serbian Radical Party	1,017	15.94		
Attila Juhász	Hungarian Coalition–István Pásztor (Affiliation: Alliance of Vojvodina Hungarians)	921	14.44		
Emilija Putnik	Democratic Party of Serbia–New Serbia Dr. Vojislav Koštunica (Affiliation: Democratic Party of Serbia)	392	6.14		
Total		6,380	100.00	4,774	100.00
Valid votes		6,380	96.36	4,774	97.87
Invalid/blank votes		241	3.64	104	2.13
Total votes		6,621	100.00	4,878	100.00
