= Smólniki Mostkowskie =

- Village
- Location within Poland
- Coordinates: 52°20′03″N 18°34′12″E
- Country: Poland
- Voivodeship: Greater Poland
- County: Konin
- Gmina: Sompolno

Smólniki Mostkowskie [smulˈniki mɔstˈkɔfskʲɛ] is a village in the administrative district of Gmina Sompolno, within Konin County, Greater Poland Voivodeship, in west-central Poland.
