= Brano =

Brano or Braňo is a Slavic male given name, a short form of the name Branislav. Notable people with this name include:

- Brano Đukanović (born 1995), Serbian professional basketball player
- Braňo Holiček (born 1985), Slovak actor and musician
- Braňo Hronec (1940–2022), Slovak composer, pianist and conductor
- Brano Likić (born 1954), composer, producer, and performer
- Brano Miljuš, Serbian politician and academic from Bosnia-Herzegovina
- Braňo Prieložný (born 1968), Slovak bobsledder
