= Bronisław Fichtel =

Polish footballer (1896–1939)

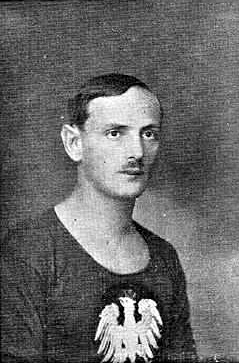

Personal information
- Date of birth: 11 November 1896
- Place of birth: Chodorów, Austria-Hungary
- Date of death: c. September 1939 (aged 42)
- Place of death: Lwów, Poland
- Position: Defender

Senior career*
| Years | Team | Apps | (Gls) |
| 1914–1931 | Pogoń Lwów | | |
| 1919 | Polonia Warsaw | | |
| 1921–1922 | Czarni Lwów | | |
| 1931–1934 | Oldboye Lwów | | |

International career
| 1925–1926 | Poland | 2 | (0) |
- * Club domestic league appearances and goals

Bronisław Fichtel (11 November 1896 – c. September 1939) was a Polish footballer who played as a defender.

He played in two matches for the Poland national football team from 1925 to 1926. He disappeared after being taken prisoner during the Soviet invasion of Poland in September 1939.

== Honours ==
Pogoń Lwów

- Polish Football Championship: 1923, 1925, 1926
