= Branislava Vičar =

Slovene professor and activist (born 1975)

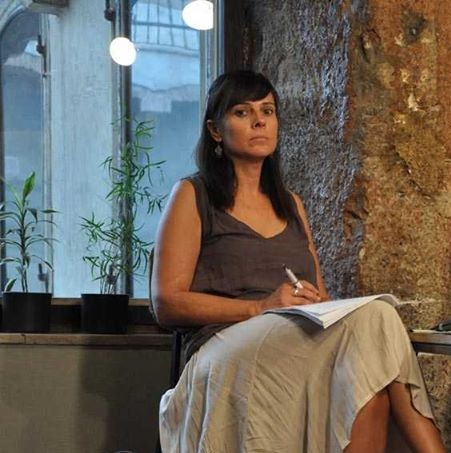
- Born: 15 March 1975; Maribor, Socialist Republic of Slovenia, Yugoslavia
- Occupations: linguist; explorer; feminist; activist

Branislava Vičar is Slovene linguist, explorer, feminist, animalist, animal protector, and professor of Slovene literature at the University of Maribor.

== Life ==
She was born in Maribor. She completed her undergraduate studies in Slovene and history at the Faculty of Education of the University of Maribor, where she also received her master's degree in 2005. In 2009, she received her doctorate at the Faculty of Arts, University of Maribor.

Her research areas are critical discourse analysis, sociolinguistics, multimodal analysis, and critical animal studies. She is active as an animal protector and the vice-president of the ZaŽivali! (ForAnimals).
