= Bronisław Ferens =

Bronisław Ferens (1912 – 24 March 1991) was a Polish ornithologist, conservationist, and professor at the Jagiellonian University. He took a special interest in the fauna of the montane region, particularly the Tatra mountains.

Ferens was born in the Żywiec region. He became interested in the birds of the Tatra mountains and began to study them. He made intensive studies on some species such as the eagle owl (Bubo bubo). He collaborated with Janusz Domaniewski and Antoni Kocyan on the conservation of the region. From 1948 to 1963 he worked with the department of nature conservation and natural resources at the Polish Academy of Sciences. In 1957 he joined an expedition to Spitsbergen. From 1960 to 1970 he headed the bird biology division of the Jagiellonian University and headed the animal ethology department from 1976 to 1982.
