= Branislav Notaros =

Coloradoan Electrical engineer

Branislav Notaros is an electrical engineer from Colorado State University in Fort Collins. He was named a Fellow of the Institute of Electrical and Electronics Engineers (IEEE) in 2016 for his contributions to higher order methods in computational electromagnetics.

He serves as the General Chair for the 2022 IEEE International Symposium on Antennas and Propagation and USNC-URSI Radio Science Meeting and a Track Editor for the IEEE Transactions on Antennas and Propagation. He serves as the President for the Applied Computational Electromagnetics Society (ACES), the Chair for USNC-URSI Commission B, and the Meetings Committee Chair for the IEEE Antennas and Propagation Society

== Personal life ==
Dr. Notaros received Dipl.Ing. (B.S.) in electrical engineering, University of Belgrade, Sch. of Elec. Eng., Yugoslavia in 1988, M.S. in electrical engineering, University of Belgrade, School of Electrical Eng., Yugoslavia in 1992, and Ph.D. in electrical engineering, University of Belgrade, School of Electrical Eng., Yugoslavia in 1995.

Dr. Notaros teaches many classes at Colorado State University in the Electrical and Computer Engineering Department, with a concentration on electromagnetics, antennas, and radar. He is married to Olivera Notaros, who also teaches in the department.
