= Branimir Kostić =

Serbian footballer

Personal information
- Full name: Branimir Kostić
- Date of birth: 23 September 1988 (age 38)
- Place of birth: Inđija, SFR Yugoslavia
- Height: 1.78 m (5 ft 10 in)
- Position: Midfielder

Youth career
- Zemun

Senior career*
| Years | Team | Apps | (Gls) |
| 2006–2012 | Inđija | 140 | (9) |
| 2012–2013 | Borac Čačak | 5 | (0) |
| 2013 | Inđija | 8 | (1) |
| 2014 | FC Ibach | 12 | (1) |
| 2014–2016 | Inđija | 28 | (0) |
| 2017–2018 | Jedinstvo Stara Pazova | | |
| 2019–2020 | Železničar Inđija | | |
| 2020-202? | Polet Novi Karlovci | | |
- * Club domestic league appearances and goals as of 19 November 2016

Branimir Kostić (Serbian Cyrillic: Бранимир Костић; born 23 September 1988) is a Serbian footballer, who plays as a midfielder
