= Antoni Kocyan =

Antoni Kocyan (Hungarian Koczyan Antal, Slovak Anton Kocian) (8 August 1836 – 22 December 1916) was a Polish-Hungarian naturalist, specimen collector, and forester. He was a collector of birds and small mammals particularly from the Tatra mountains. A Silurian fossil coral Avicenia kocyani is named in his honour.

Antoni was born in Maków Podhalański and worked in Kuźnice from 1856 for the Homolacs family in Zakład Hutniczy. He trained in specimen preservation under Ernst Schauer (1812–1888) while on a trip together into the Tatra mountains in 1861. He took part in the January Uprising in 1863 along with Bronisław and Stanisław Homolacs and in the process lost vision in one eye. He then worked on the estate forests from 1867 to 1870 and then in the Orawa region (1870–1885) and then at Zuberec (1885–1910). Numerous Polish zoologists visited him including Tytus Chałubiński, Antoni Rehmann, August Wrześniowski, Justyn Karliński, Józef Rostafiński, Marian Łomnicki, Jan Grzegorzewski, Walery and Stanisław Eljasz-Radzikowski; Jan Gwalbert Pawlikowski, Gyula Madarász, Victor Tschusi zu Schmidhoffen, Henryk Sienkiewicz, Helena Modrzejewska, Kazimierz Tetmajer, Wojciech Kossak and Stanisław Barabasz. He contributed notes on the zoology of the Tatra mountains from 1866. He also supplied specimens collected in the Tatra mountains to several museums. Nearly 224 bird specimens representing 166 species in the Orava Castle are from his collection. He also supplied specimens for the Podtatranské Museum Poprad and the Tatra Museum, Zakopane (406 birds and 50 mammal specimens). From 1910 until his death he lived at Mokradź near Dolny Kubin.
