= Branimir Spasić =

Serbian politician

Branimir Spasić (Serbian Cyrillic: Бранимир Спасић; born 1986) is a politician in Serbia. He has served in the National Assembly of Serbia since 2020 as a member of the Serbian Progressive Party.

== Private career ==
Spasić lives in Lebane. He works as a lawyer.

== Politician ==
Spasić received the 177th position Progressive Party's Aleksandar Vučić — For Our Children list in the 2020 Serbian parliamentary election and was elected when the list won a landslide majority with 188 out of 250 mandates. He had not previously been a candidate for election to any level of government. He is a member of the assembly committee on administrative, budget, mandate, and immunity issues; a member of the committee on labour, social issues, social inclusion, and poverty reduction; a deputy member of the committee on the judiciary, public administration, and local self-government; and a member of the parliamentary friendship groups with Brazil, Canada, China, Denmark, Greece, Iceland, Japan, Qatar, Russia, the United Arab Emirates, the United Kingdom, and the United States of America.
