= Bronisław Dankowski =

Polish politician (1944–2020)

Bronisław Dankowski (22 August 1944 – 2 December 2020) was a Polish politician who served as a member of the Sejm.
