= Koszary, Greater Poland Voivodeship =

Koszary
- Village
- Location within Poland
- Coordinates: 52°18′31″N 18°30′35″E
- Country: Poland
- Voivodeship: Greater Poland
- County: Konin
- Gmina: Sompolno

Koszary [kɔˈʂarɨ] is a village in the administrative district of Gmina Sompolno, within Konin County, Greater Poland Voivodeship, in west-central Poland.
