= Zakrzewek, Gmina Sompolno =

Zakrzewek
- Village
- Location within Poland
- Coordinates: 52°20′28″N 18°32′23″E
- Country: Poland
- Voivodeship: Greater Poland
- County: Konin
- Gmina: Sompolno

Zakrzewek [zaˈkʂɛvɛk] is a village in the administrative district of Gmina Sompolno, within Konin County, Greater Poland Voivodeship, in west-central Poland.
