= Branimir Lokner =

Branimir Lokner is a music editor and reviewer from Belgrade, Serbia.

He worked as a music critic beginning in 1980, and has released two books about critical views oriented to former Yugoslavian artists. He writes about music, radio and TV programs/editions. He appeared as one of many supporters of the Serbian record lebel Grand Production. His criticism can be found on many webzines/sites/portals.

== Works ==
- Kritičko pakovanje, Active Time, 199?, ISBN 978-86-7636-000-0
- Helikopter na glavi: istorija rokenrola u Pančevu: 1962-2004, Tim za komunikaciju, 2005, ISBN 978-86-907049-0-3
- Od Čivija do Goblina: ilustrovana rock enciklopedija Šapca: (1963.-1999.-2006.), Kulturni centar, 2006, ISBN 978-86-84045-09-8
