= Bronisław Hager =

Polish activist and health pioneer

- Born: January 30, 1890; Miłosław, Province of Posen, Prussia, German Empire
- Died: June 30, 1969 (aged 79)
- Scientific career
- Fields: Medicine

Bronisław Hager (1890–1969) was a Polish activist and public health pioneer.

Born in Miłosław, he was awarded a medical degree from the Jagiellonian University. He served in the Austrian army during World War I. During the Silesian Uprisings, he was active in community organizations in Zebrze, serving as civilian commissioner, plebiscite commissioner and regimental physician. In 1922, when Zabrze came under German control, he moved to Tarnowskie Góry. During World War II, he went to France and then to London where he became part of the Polish government in exile. After the war he returned to Tarnowskie Góry, where he was a public health physician, deputy mayor, member of the Silesian Parliament, and an activist in numerous organizations. He translated Alexander Fleming's work on the discovery of penicillin, and wrote a memoir, Tarnogórskie obrazki. He was the recipient of several decorations, such as the Medal of Independence, the Silesian Uprising Cross and the Commander's Cross of the Order of Polonia Restituta.

He retired in 1967 and died in 1969, survived by his wife Ludmila and two daughters.
