= Bronislovas Genzelis =

Lithuanian politician (1934–2023)

Personal details
- Born: 16 February 1934; Aukštadvaris, Lithuania
- Died: 18 December 2023 (aged 89); Vilnius, Lithuania

Bronislovas Genzelis (16 February 1934 – 18 December 2023) was a Lithuanian politician. In 1990, he was among those who signed the Act of the Re-Establishment of the State of Lithuania. Genzelis was a well-known Lithuanian philosopher, politician and public figure. He died in Vilnius on 18 December 2023, at the age of 89.
