= Đorđo Peruničić =

Montenegrin handball player (born 1993)

Djordjo Perunicic
Personal information
- Full name: Đorđo Peruničić
- Nationality: Montenegrin
- Born: 4 August 1993 (age 33) Cetinje, Montenegro
- Height: 1.95 m (6 ft 5 in)

Sport
- Sport: Handball
- Position: Left back
- Current club: RK Budvanska Rivijera - Budva
- Number: 8
National team
- Years: Team
- –: Montenegro

Đorđo Peruničić (born 4 August 1993) is a Montenegrin handball player who plays for RK Partizan - Tivat and occasionally for the Montenegrin national team.
