= Bronius Kuzmickas =

Lithuanian politician (1935–2023)

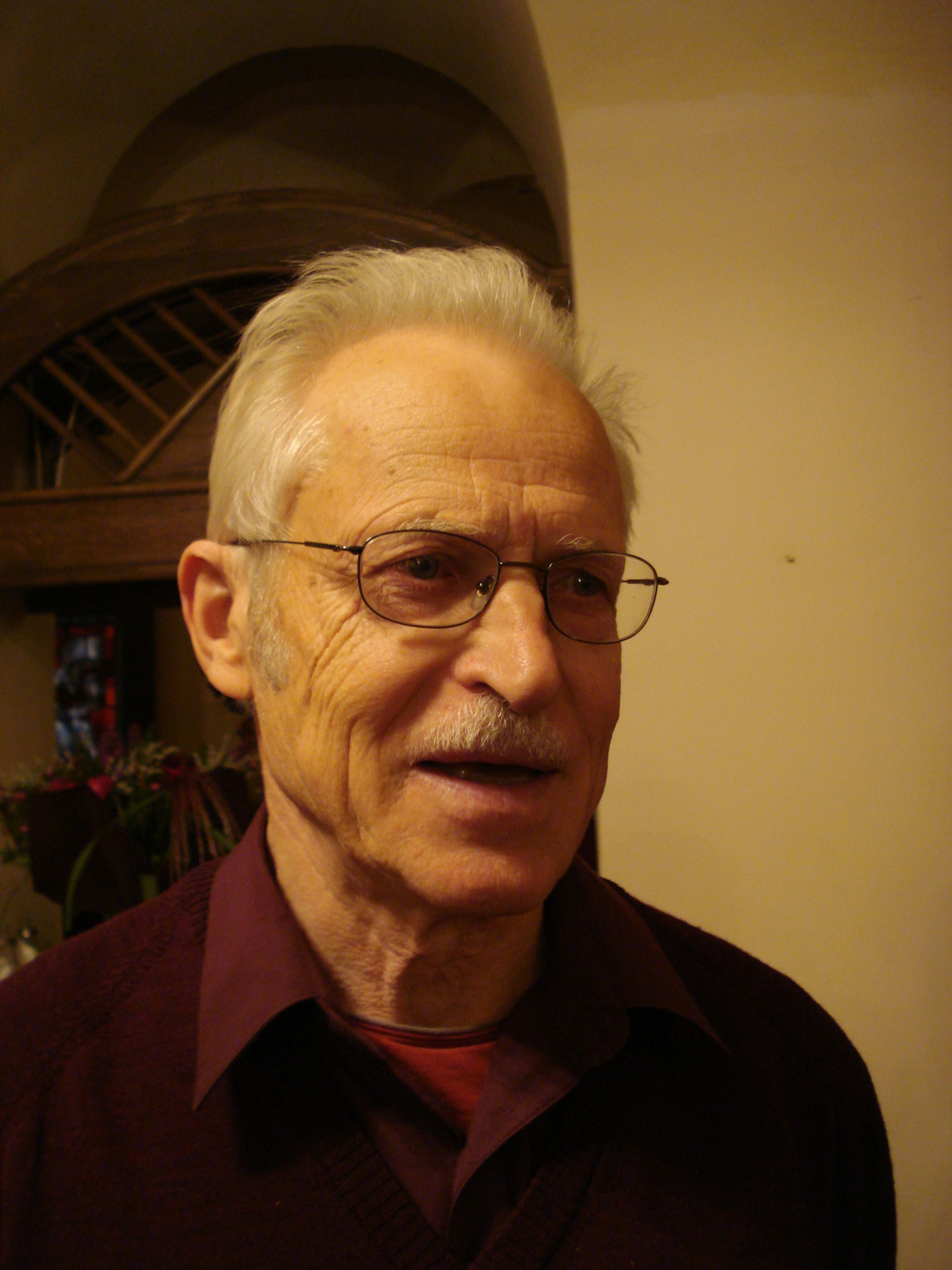
Kuzmickas in 2008

Bronius Kuzmickas (10 November 1935 – 6 November 2023) was a Lithuanian politician and philosopher. In 1990 he was among those who signed the Act of the Re-Establishment of the State of Lithuania. Kuzmickas died on 6 November 2023, at the age of 87.

== Sources ==
- Bibliography
