= Tadeusz Wałek-Czarnecki =

Polish historian

Tadeusz Bronisław Wałek-Czarnecki (1889–1949) was a Polish historian.

Wałek-Czarnecki studied history and archaeology at the Jagiellonian University, as a pupil of Piotr Bieńkowski. In 1910 he went abroad and studied in Berlin under E. Meyet and A. Erman, and in Paris under A. Moret.

In the winter of 1913-1914 he took part in the Austrian excavations at Giza conducted by Junker. At the International Congress of Population (Paris 1937) he presented a paper La population de l'Egypte ancienne.

Professor of Ancient History at the University of Warsaw, during the years 1939-1941 and 1945 he stayed at IFAO, Cairo, from 1949 he resided in England.
