= Branislav Stamenković =

Serbian basketball coach and player

Personal information
- Born: 7 December 1954 (age 71) Vukovar, PR Croatia, Yugoslavia

Career information
- NBA draft: 1976: undrafted
- Playing career: 1972–N/A
- Number: 5, 11

Career history

Playing
- 1972–1975: Vukovar
- 1975–1976: Jugoplastika
- 1976–1979: Crvena zvezda
- 1979–1980: OKK Beograd
- 1980–N/A: Borovo Vukovar

Coaching
- 1988–1989: Borovo Vukovar

Branislav "Brana" Stamenković (Serbian Cyrillic: Бранислав "Брана" Стаменковић; born 17 August 1954) is a Serbian professional basketball coach and former player.

== Playing career ==
Born in Vukovar, Stamenković began with his basketball career with his hometown team KK Vukovar. During his career he played for Jugoplastika, Crvena zvezda, OKK Beograd, and KK Borovo. Stamenković was a member of the 1975–76 Jugoplastika roster under Petar Skansi that won the FIBA Korać Cup. He retired as a player with Borovo Vukovar.

== Coaching career ==
After retirement, Stamenković joined a youth system of KK Borovo Vukovar as a head coach. In the 1988–89 season, he became the head coach of the Borovo senior team. In the same season, his team lost to Partizan in the Yugoslav Cup Semifinals.

In 1997, Stamenković moved to Belgrade, Serbia where he continued his career within youth system of clubs such as KK Sava, Mega Basket. Since 2013, he has been youth coach of KK BASK.

== Career achievements ==
- FIBA Korać Cup champion: 1 (with Jugoplastika: 1975–76)
