= Branislav Tvarožek =

Slovak political prisoner (born 1925)

- Born: 2 December 1925 (age 100); Lok, Czechoslovakia
- Known for: Participation in the Slovak National Uprising, political persecution during communism

Branislav Tvarožek (born 2 December 1925) is a Slovak anti-Nazi resistance participant and former political prisoner.

== Biography ==
=== Early life and anti-Nazi resistance ===
Branislav Tvarožek was born on 2 December 1925 in the predominantly Hungarian village of Lok in Levice District. He was educated for the first two years by Slovak language school built by his parents in his village. Afterwards, the family moved to the village He grew up in the village of Brezová pod Bradlom, close to Moravia, where the influence of the Czechoslovak Legion was very strong. His uncle, the architect Juraj Tvarožek was a member of the Legion.

Tvarožek was 14 years old when Czechoslovakia dissolved in March 1939 and the Slovak State was established. At the time, Tvarožek was already as a secondary school student in Bratislava. He engaged in small acts of resistance against the wartime authoritarian regime. Together with classmates he painted over swastikas and distributed anti-Nazi and anti-Tiso leaflets. He was caught by a German patrol and subsequently expelled from school. After his expulsion, he moved to Nové Mesto nad Váhom, where his father ran a business.

In 1944, during the Second World War, Tvarožek joined the Slovak National Uprising. He served as a guard for the uprising’s key military leaders, generals Ján Golian and Rudolf Viest, together with his cousin Živodar Tvarožek. After the collapse of the uprising and capture of Golian and Viest, Tvarožek was stranded with the remains of the resistance forces commanded by general Ludvík Svoboda and eventually captured by German forces. He avoided being shot by persuading German soldiers in fluent German that his comrade’s uniform had mismatched Russian buttons only because his clothing had burned. His knowledge of German later helped him avoid deportation to a POW camp, after convincing a doctor to classify him among the wounded. After escaping from a military hospital together with a Jewish detainee, he traveled in borrowed civilian clothes home to Nové Mesto nad Váhom, where he and his father Eduard Tvarožek assisted local partisans.

=== Persecution during communism ===
After the war, Tvarožek finished his training as an electrician school and began studying electrical engineering at the Slovak University of Technology in Bratislava. Following the communist takeover of Czechoslovakia in February 1948, he was arrested for giving shelter to his cousin Živodar Tvarožek, who worked as a courier for Western intelligence services. In 1949, he was sentenced to five years in prison and sent to the notorious Jáchymov uranium mines, part of the Czechoslovak forced-labor camp system supplying uranium to the Soviet Union. In the camp he initially performed heavy labor transporting blasted rock, but later managed to secure a position in the locksmith and electrical workshops—assignments. During his time at Jáchymov, his eyes were damaged and he went nearly blind and learned of the death of his father for months before the end of his sentence. After serving his sentence, he was released but forcibly recruited to penal battalion and sent back to the mines. However, after pleading that he had already worked for years in the mind, he was released and allowed to work as an electrician.

=== Life after persecution ===
In 1960 he married and settled with his wife Emília in Bratislava, where he worked as an electrician and stopped engaging in political activities. After the death of his wife in 2016, he again became politically active, participating on events of former political prisoners. During the 2015 refugee crisis, he was among the first persons from the former Czechoslovakia who signed the appeal of former anti-fascist resistance fighters pleading their governments to welcome refugees. In 2018, he contributed to a book about the Czechoslovak legions.
