= Bronisław Gosztyła =

Polish ice hockey player

- Born: October 11, 1935 Krynica, Poland
- Died: October 18, 1991 (aged 56) Warsaw, Poland
- Height: 5 ft 5 in (165 cm)
- Weight: 154 lb (70 kg; 11 st 0 lb)
- Position: Left wing
- Played for: KTH Krynica; Legia Warsaw
- National team: Poland
- Playing career: 1954–1967

Bronisław Gosztyła (11 October 1935 — 18 October 1991) was a Polish ice hockey player. He played for KTH Krynica and Legia Warsaw during a career that lasted from 1949 until 1968. He also played for the Polish national team at several world championships as well as the 1956 and 1964 Winter Olympics. He won the Polish hockey league championship seven times in his career.
