= Bronislovas Burneikis =

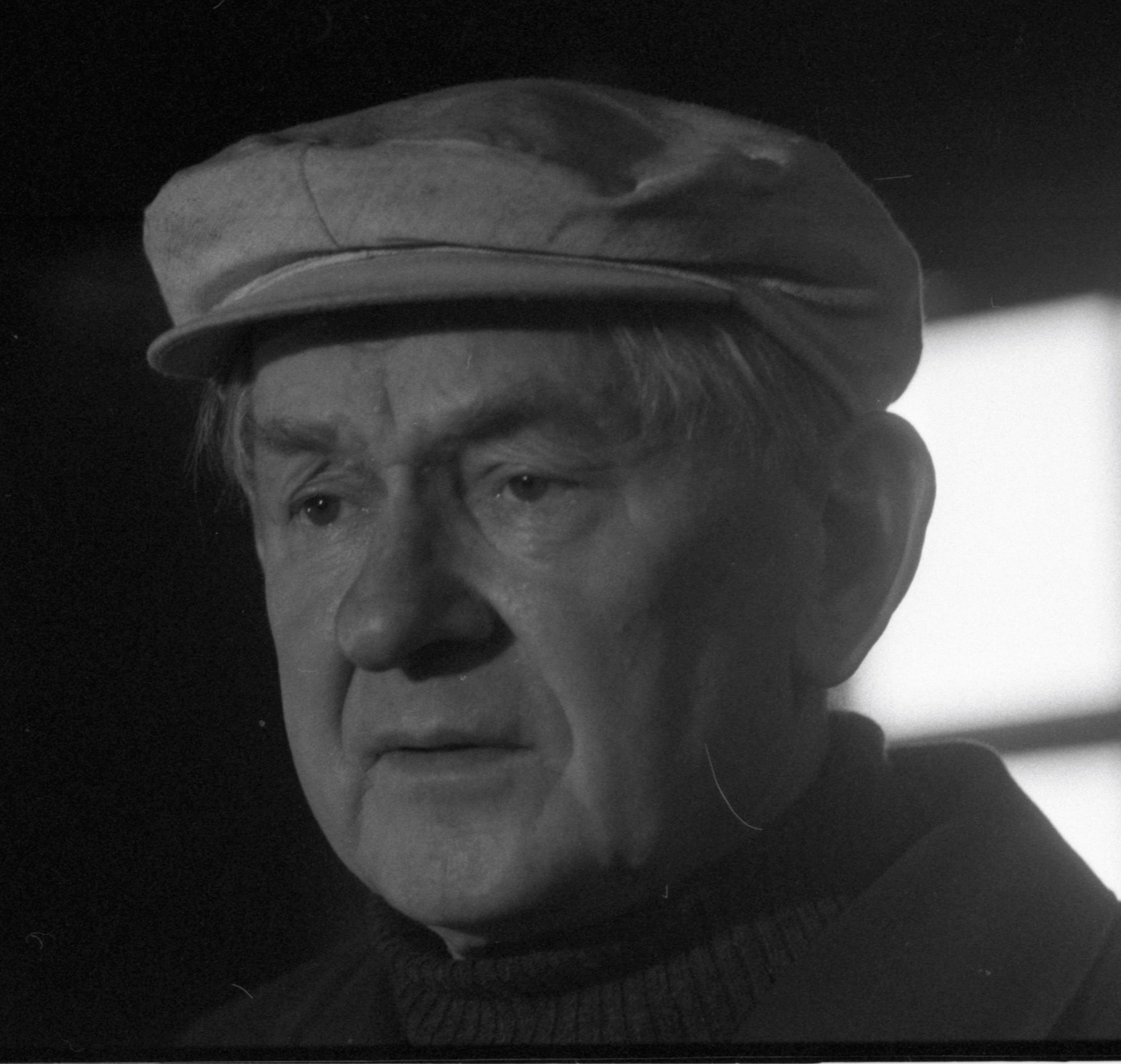
Burneikis in 1988

Bronislovas Burneikis (January 9, 1923 – September 10, 1991) was a Lithuanian Catholic priest, monsignor, and prelate known for his pivotal role in constructing several churches in Klaipėda and Kretinga. A political prisoner during the Soviet era, Burneikis also contributed significantly to the revival of bell casting in Lithuania.

== Early life and education ==
Bronislovas Burneikis was born in the village of Sungailai in the Tverai area, now part of the Rietavas municipality in Telšiai District, where his family owned 10 hectares of land. He completed his secondary education independently and later enrolled in the Roman Catholic seminary in Telšiai, which is now the Telšiai Bishop Vincentas Borisevičius Priest Seminary. In 1947, he continued his theological studies at the Kaunas Priest Seminary and was ordained as a priest on September 24, 1950.

== Ministry and early career ==
Burneikis began his ministry as a vicar in Veiviržėnai, where he also secretly performed pastoral work in the Kaliningrad region. In 1957, he was appointed as a vicar at the Queen of Peace Church in Klaipėda, collaborating with priests Liudvikas Povilionis and Bernardas Talaišis to oversee the church's construction.

== Persecution and imprisonment ==
The Queen of Peace Church in Klaipėda was a significant project as it was the only church constructed during the Soviet era in Lithuania and the Baltic states. Shortly after its completion in 1960, Soviet authorities confiscated the church and began persecuting those involved. In 1961, Burneikis and Pavilionis were arrested; in 1962, Burneikis was sentenced to four years of forced labor. During his sentence, he was imprisoned in Marijampolė, the Pravieniškės labor camp, and later in Orsha, Byelorussian SSR. After serving his sentence, Burneikis returned to Telšiai but was barred by Soviet authorities from continuing his pastoral work there.

== Later ministry and contributions ==
Following his release, Burneikis served in various parishes, including Žasliai, Tirkšliai, and Žemalė, where he undertook significant construction projects. In 1980, he was appointed parish priest of Kretinga, where he supervised the reconstruction of the church tower, the casting of bells, and the building of a stone wall around the churchyard. By 1982, he was dean of the Palanga Deanery and later took Dean (Christianity) care of St. Andrew's Church in Tūbausiai.

== Reviving bell casting in Lithuania ==
Burneikis played a central role in reviving bell casting in Lithuania after studying the craft in Germany. In 1984, he established a bell foundry in Kadagynai village, Kretinga District, producing around 20 bells for churches across Lithuania.

== Return to Klaipėda and further work ==
In 1988, during Lithuania's independence movement, Burneikis became the parish priest and dean of the Queen of Peace Church in Klaipėda. Under his leadership, the church’s tower was rebuilt, the interior restored, and a new organ was acquired. He also took pastoral responsibility for additional parishes, including Plikiai, Nida, and Juodkrantė.

In 1990, Burneikis became the parish priest of St. Joseph the Worker Church in Klaipėda, securing land for the church's construction and establishing a Jesuit monastery in the city.

== Recognition and honors ==
- Burneikis was granted the honorary title of Chaplain of His Holiness by Pope John Paul II, recognizing his contributions to the Catholic Church during his priesthood.
- In 2024, a park in the center of Kretinga was named in honor of Burneikis, commemorating his lifelong commitment to the Lithuanian Catholic Church and his resilience under Soviet oppression.

== Death and burial ==
Bronislovas Burneikis died on September 10, 1991, in Klaipėda. He was buried on the grounds of the Queen of Peace Church, where he had previously served as a parish priest and played a significant role in its restoration and community activities.
