= Mąkolno, Greater Poland Voivodeship =

Mąkolno
- Village
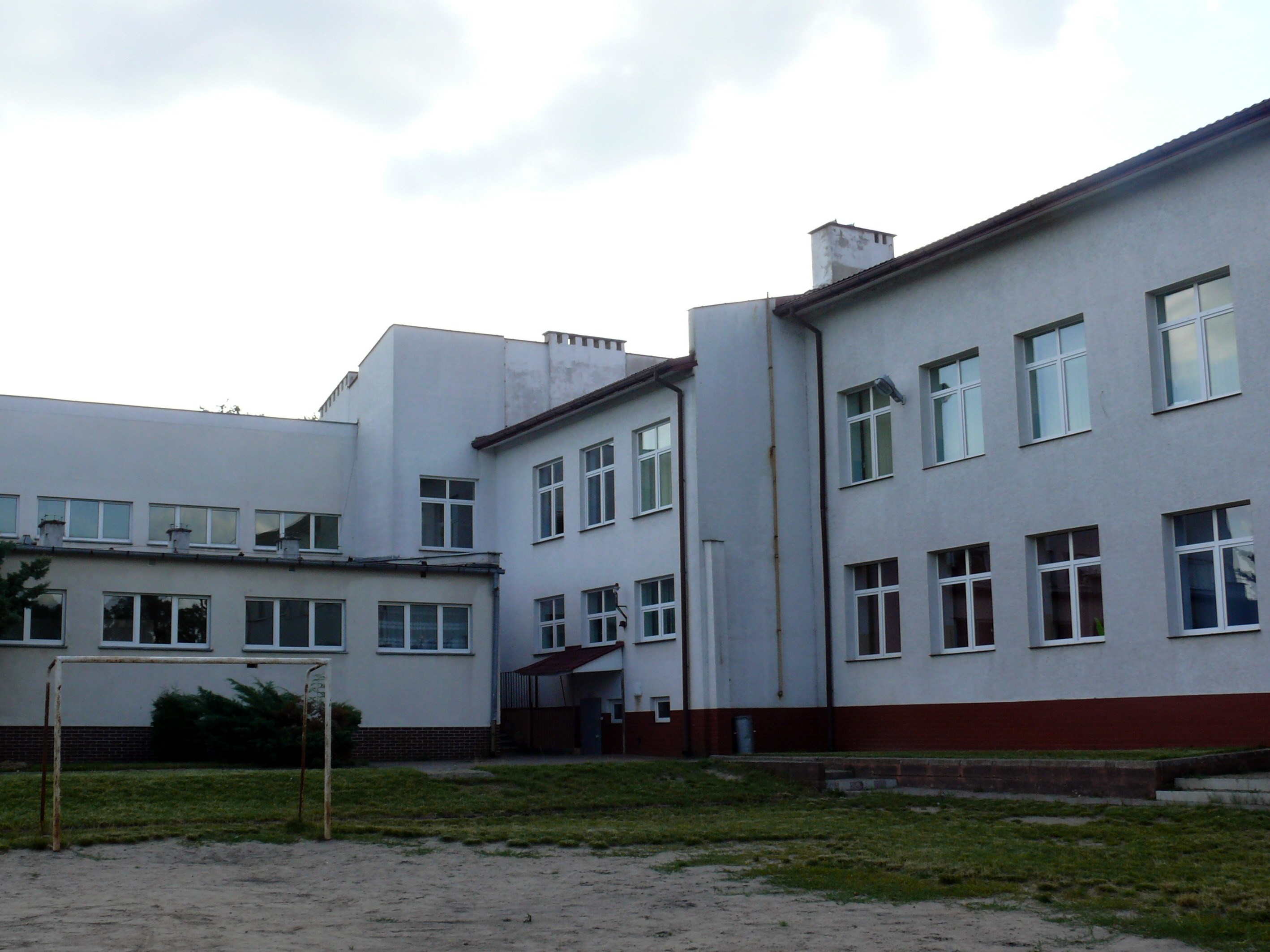

- Location within Poland
- Coordinates: 52°21′05″N 18°34′25″E
- Country: Poland
- Voivodeship: Greater Poland
- County: Konin
- Gmina: Sompolno

Mąkolno [mɔnˈkɔlnɔ] is a village in the administrative district of Gmina Sompolno, within Konin County, Greater Poland Voivodeship, in west-central Poland.
