= Bronislovas Rudys =

Lithuanian image and installation art artist

Bronislovas Rudys (born 1954) also known as Bronius Rudys is a Lithuanian image and installation art artist. Since 1986 he has been a member of the Lithuanian Artists' Association. During the period from 1986 to 2008 Rudys has had over 20 individual and over 60 group art exhibitions all over Lithuania as well as in other countries. He lives and works as a fine art teacher in Šiauliai.

== Awards and grants from Lithuania ==
- Award by the Board of Culture for the exhibition „The Print of Lithuania 1986-1989", (1989)
- Grant by the "Soros's Centre of Contemporary Art", Vilnius, (1994)
- The First- Class State grant for the creative work, (1997–1998)
- Award from Šiauliai Art Gallery, (2002)
- "The Artist of the Year" award, Šiauliai, (2004)
- State grant for individual creative work, (2004–2005)
- Award for innovatory work from Šiauliai Art Gallery, (2007)
- Award for conceptual minimalism work from Šiauliai Art Gallery, (2011)
- State grant for individual creative work, (2014)

== Notes ==
- http://www.culture.lt/daile/04(1)/bra.htm
