= Bronisław Kazimierz Przybylski =

Polish composer (1941–2011)

Bronisław Kazimierz Przybylski (born 11 December 1941 in Łódź, died 4 April 2011 in Łódź) was a Polish composer and educator.

== Biography ==
He studied at the Academy of Music in Łódź where he received a diploma in music theory from Franciszek Wesołowski in 1964 and a diploma in composition under Tomasz Kiesewetter in 1969. He also studied under Bolesław Szabelski in Katowice and with Roman Haubenstock-Ramati at the Vienna Hochschule für Musik. From 1965, he was an academic teacher at the Academy of Music in Łódź, and starting in 1987 taught composition there – first as an associate professor, and later as a full professor (from 1992 until his death). In the years 1978–1981 he was the Vice-Rector for Didactic Affairs at his alma mater, from 1987 to 1990 the Dean of the Faculty of Composition, Theory of Music and Eurhythmics, and in the years 1991–2011 the head of the Department of Composition.

In 1982 he initiated "Musica Moderna", a program that presents contemporary works of Polish and foreign composers twice each academic year.

== Selected works ==
- In honorem Nicolai Copernici for orchestra (1972)
- Memento for orchestra (1973)
- Guernica – Pablo Picasso in memoriam for orchestra (1974)
- Polish Symphony (No. 1) for orchestra (1974)
- Voices for two speakers and ensemble (1974)
- Requiem. In Memory of the Children – Martyrs of the War for soprano, two speakers, children choir and orchestra (1976)
- Arnold Schönberg in memoriam for string quartet (1977)
- A Varsovie for orchestra and piano/tape (1980)
- Miriam. Mistero di morte, ballet music for orchestra (1985)
- Concerto classico for accordion and symphony or string orchestra (1986)
- Lacrimosa 2000 for string orchestra (1991)
- Missa Papae Joannis Pauli Secundi (Mass of Pope John Paul II) for soprano, mixed choir and symphony orchestra (1998)
- Silent Shores (Wybrzeża pełne ciszy) for soprano, vibraphone, 3 tamtams and string orchestra to words by Karol Wojtyła (2003)
- Desert flowers (Kwiaty pustyni) for ensemble (2010)

== Awards ==
Przybylski has gotten fifteen awards for composition in national and international competitions. His works have been presented at major festivals of contemporary music, such as "Warsaw Autumn", "Music Spring" (Poznań),"Musica Polonica Nova" (Wrocław), "World Music Days – ISCM" (Tel Aviv), "Musikprotokoll" (Graz), and "The International Rostrum of Composers" (Paris).

== Bibliography ==
- Encyklopedia muzyki. Andrzej Chodkowski (ed.). Warsaw: PWN. 1995. pp. 729. ISBN 83-01-11390-1.
- Kompozytor i jego świat. Bronisław Kazimierz Przybylski in memoriam [The Composer and his World. Bronisław Kazimierz Przybylski in memoriam]. Ewa Kowalska-Zając, Marta Szoka (eds.). Łódź: Academy of Music in Łódź. 2012. ISBN 9788378474906.
