= Bronisław Kuśnierz =

Polish lawyer and politician (1883–1966)

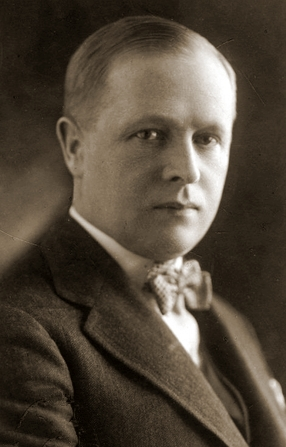
Bronisław Kuśnierz

Bronisław Kuśnierz (January 27, 1883 – April, 27, 1966) was a Polish lawyer and politician, M.P. (1928–1930), Minister of Justice of the Republic of Poland in exile (1944–1949).
