= Sava Damjanov =

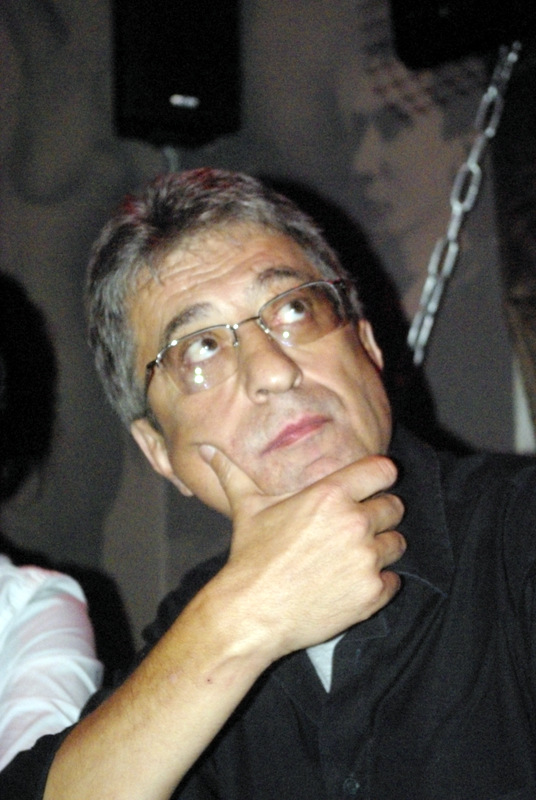
- Sava Damjanov, 2009.
- Born: 29 September 1956. Novi Sad, SFRY

Sava Damjanov (Serbian Cyrillic: Сава Дамјанов; born 29 September 1956) is a Serbian novelist, literary critic, short story writer, and literary historian. His efforts are directed primarily towards fantastic fictions, erratic and linguistically experimental strata in the Serbian tradition, reception theory, Postmodernism and Comparative Studies.

== Life and work ==
Sava Damjanov graduated from the University of Novi Sad in 1980, and did his Ph.D. in 1996 at the same university, under the mentorship of Milorad Pavić. He edited texts written by 18th, 19th and 20th century Serbian authors for contemporary publication. In the 1990s, he was the editor of the magazine for world literature Pismo (Letter), and Sveti Dunav (Saint Danube), a magazine dedicated to Central European culture. He was the editor of "Biblioteka srpske fantastike" (Collection of Serbian Fantastic Fiction), as well as the series called "The Novi Sad Manuscript".

During the winter term of 2001/2002., Damjanov taught at the Department of Slavistics at the University Tuebingen. He was also a guest lecturer at the Universities in Regensburg, Freiburg, Berlin, Halle, Trier, Göttingen, Bonn, Kraków, Wrocław, Warsaw, Gdańsk, Łódź, Opolе, Veliko Trnovo, Ljubljana and Skopje.

His texts have been translated into English, French, German, Russian, Polish, Czech, Hungarian, Slovakian, Ruthenian, Ukrainian, Bulgarian, Slovenian, Romanian and Macedonian. His works have been included in anthologies of Serbian contemporary prose.

== Bibliography ==
- Истраживање cавршенства (novel), Belgrade 1983;
- Граждански еротикон (anthology of Serbian erotic poetry), Niš 1987.
- Корени модерне српске фантастике (a study on modern Serbian fantastic fiction), Novi Sad 1988.
- Колачи, oбмане, Нонсенси (collection of short stories), Београд 1989.
- Шта то беше млада српска проза? (essays), Београд 1990.
- Причке (collection of short stories), Београд 1994.
- Нова (постмодерна) српска фантастика (anthology of Serbian postmodern fantastic fiction), Belgrade 1994.
- Кодер: историја једне рецепције (essays), Belgrade 1997.
- Повести различне: лирске, епске, но највише неизрециве (short stories), Novi Sad 1997.
- Глосолалија (collection of short stories), Novi Sad 2001.
- Ново читање традиције (essays), Novi Sad 2002.
- Антологија сербској постмодерној фантастики (essays on Serbian postmodern fantastic fiction, published in Ukrainian), Lviv, 2004.
- Постмодерна српска фантастика (anthology of Serbian postmodern fantastic fiction), Novi Sad 2004.
- Ремек-делца (short stories), Belgrade 2005.
- Ерос и По(р)нос (short stories and essays), Belgrade 2006.
- Историја као aпокриф (novel), Novi Sad 2008.
- Апокрифна историја српске (пост)модерне (essays), Belgrade 2008.
- Порно-литургија Архиепископа Саве (short stories), Novi Sad, Zrenjanin 2010.
- Дамјанов: српска књижевност искоса (essays), Belgrade 2011-2012:
- Итика Јерополитика@Вук (novel), Novi Sad–Zrenjanin 2014.
- Also sprach Damjanov (selected interviews with commentary), Зрењанин 2019.
- Дамјанов: Искони бѢ слово (selected prose), Novi Sad 2018–2021.
