= Branislav Pipović =

Serbian writer (born 1959)

Branislav Pipović (born 10 May 1959) is a Serbian writer who lives and works in Belgrade, Serbia.

He is the author of theatrical plays like Paris Commune (directed by Paolo Magelli, Theater "Atelier 212", Belgrade, 1988), The Pagans ("The Scene", Novi Sad, 1993), Blue Angel (Der Blaue Engel), music drama (based on Heinrich Mann's novel, 2007, directed by Erol Kadić, Theater "Madlenianum", Belgrade, 2013), Who Cares/Star is Born (directed by Miloš Paunović "People's Theater" Banja Luka, Republic of Srpska, Bosnia and Hercegovina, 2009), and Winter Suite, a collection of short stories ("Prosveta", Belgrade, 1997). His other published works include The Castle: Sleeping Beauty, hermetism study: an Initiation into the Mystery of Rose and Cross (LOM, Belgrade, 2001); published in English by "Lux Mundi Press", New York, 2009, Dramas (collected plays, "Ukronija", Belgrade, 2011). He has also number of stories published in literary magazines in Serbia and Belgrade's daily "Politika".
