= Klonowa, Greater Poland Voivodeship =

Klonowa
- Village
- Location within Poland
- Coordinates: 52°18′N 18°31′E
- Country: Poland
- Voivodeship: Greater Poland
- County: Konin
- Gmina: Sompolno

Klonowa [klɔˈnɔva] is a village in the administrative district of Gmina Sompolno, within Konin County, Greater Poland Voivodeship, in west-central Poland.
