= Branislav Miličević =

Serbian footballer

Personal information
- Full name: Branislav Miličević
- Date of birth: 23 July 1983 (age 43)
- Place of birth: Yugoslavia
- Position: Defender

Senior career*
Years	Team	Apps	(Gls)
- Šumadija Jagnjilo
2005–2007	Keflavík	43	(0)
2008–2011	Start	63	(0)
- * Club domestic league appearances and goals as of 16 September 2008

Branislav Miličević (born 23 July 1983) is a Serbian football retired defender. His latest club was Norwegian side Start.

He came to Start in 2008, and has been a regular on the team in the 2008 season. Miličević has earlier played for the Serbian club FK Šumadija Jagnjilo, and the Icelandic club Keflavík.

Miličević' contract expired after the 2011 season, and he was not offered a new contract and left the club who was relegated from Tippeligaen.

== Career statistics ==
Club	Season	Division	League		Cup		Total	
Club	Season	Division	Apps	Goals	Apps	Goals	Apps	Goals
2008	Start	Adeccoligaen	26	0	1	0	27	0
2009	Start	Tippeligaen	25	0	2	0	27	0
2010	Start	Tippeligaen	7	0	2	0	9	0
2011	Start	Tippeligaen	5	0	1	0	6	0
Career Total			63	0	6	0	69	0
