= Branislav Mitrović (politician) =

Serbian politician (born 1966)

- Бранислав Митровић

Member of the National Assembly of Serbia
- In office 2008–2014

President of the Užice City Assembly
- Incumbent
- Assumed office 2016

Personal details
- Born: August 29, 1966 (age 60) Užice, Socialist Republic of Serbia, Socialist Federal Republic of Yugoslavia
- Party: Positive Užice
- Other political affiliations: G17 Plus; United Regions of Serbia
- Education: University of Kragujevac (Faculty of Technical Sciences, Čačak)
- Occupation: politician, professor of informatics

Branislav Mitrović (Serbian Cyrillic: Бранислав Митровић; born 29 August 1966) is a politician in Serbia. He was a member of the National Assembly of Serbia for most of the time between 2008 and 2014, serving with G17 Plus and the United Regions of Serbia (Ujedinjeni regioni Srbije, URS). He is now a member of Positive Užice and has been the president (i.e., speaker) of the Užice city assembly since 2016.

== Early life and private career ==
Mitrović was born in Užice, in what was then the Socialist Republic of Serbia in the Socialist Federal Republic of Yugoslavia. Raised in the community, he graduated from the technical faculty in Čačak and is a professor of informatics. He began working for Serbian Railways in 1992, and in 2005–06 he was a city manager in Užice.

== Politician ==
=== Early years (2003–08) ===
Mitrović joined G17 Plus in 2003. He received the sixth position on the party's electoral list for the Užice assembly in the 2004 Serbian local elections and was given a mandate after the list won four seats. (In this election, one-third of assembly mandates were awarded to candidates on successful lists in numerical order, with the remaining two-thirds assigned to other candidates at the discretion of the sponsoring parties or coalitions. Mitrović's relatively low position on the list did not prevent him from receiving a mandate.) He resigned on 13 December 2005, presumably after his appointment as a city manager.

He appeared in the 151st position on the G17 Plus list in the 2007 Serbian parliamentary election. The list won nineteen seats, and he was not selected for a mandate. (From 2000 to 2011, all mandates in Serbian parliamentary elections were assigned to candidates on successful lists at the discretion of the sponsoring parties or coalitions, irrespective of numerical order. Mitrović could have been awarded a mandate notwithstanding his position on the list, which was in any event mostly alphabetical.)

He was appointed as commissioner of the Zlatibor District in 2007 and held this role for the next year.

=== Parliamentarian (2008–14) ===
G17 Plus contested the 2008 parliamentary election as part of the For a European Serbia (Za evropsku Srbiju, ZES) alliance led by the Democratic Party (Demokratska stranka, DS). Mitrović was given the 128th position on the list and was chosen for a mandate when the alliance won 102 out of 250 seats. The overall results of the election were inconclusive, but the ZES alliance eventually formed a coalition government with the Socialist Party of Serbia (Socijalistička partija Srbije, SPS), and Mitrović served as a government supporter. He was a member of the committee on justice and administration, the committee on petitions and proposals, the legislative committee, and the parliamentary friendship groups with Japan, the Netherlands, and Slovakia.

He also appeared in the second position on the ZES's list in Užice in the concurrent 2008 Serbian local elections and was given a mandate when the list won twenty-eight seats. He resigned his place in the local assembly on 22 July 2008.

Serbia's electoral laws were reformed in 2011, such that all mandates were awarded to candidates on successful lists in numerical order. G17 Plus contested the 2012 parliamentary election with the United Regions of Serbia coalition. Mitrović received the twenty-fifth position on the URS list and was not immediately re-elected when the list won sixteen seats. He also received the lead position on the URS list for the Užice assembly in the 2012 local elections and took a mandate when the list won seven seats.

Mitrović was given a seat in the national assembly on 22 October 2012 as the replacement for fellow URS member Nebojša Zdravković, who had resigned. Although he was not required to do so, Mitrović resigned from the Užice local assembly on the same day. The URS initially participated in a coalition government with the SPS and the Serbian Progressive Party (Srpska napredna stranka, SNS), and Mitrović again served as a government supporter. On 31 July 2013, the URS moved into opposition. During his second term in the national assembly, Mitrović was a member of the committee on foreign affairs, a deputy member of the committee on environmental protection, and a member of Serbia's delegation to the parliamentary assembly of the Collective Security Treaty Organization.

The URS was transformed from an alliance to a unified political party in 2013, and Mitrović became a member of the new organization. He was given the thirty-second position on the URS's list in the 2014 parliamentary election, in which the party did not cross the electoral threshold to receive assembly representation.

=== Speaker of the local assembly (2016–present) ===
The URS ceased to be a credible force in Serbian politics after the 2014 election, and Mitrović founded a local political party called Positive Užice later in the year. This party contested the 2016 local elections as part of the Progressive Party's alliance; Mitrović received the twenty-third position on its list and was elected to a fourth local term when the list won thirty-four seats. After the election, he was chosen as assembly speaker.

Positive Užice continued its alliance with the SNS into the 2022 local elections; Mitrović received the nineteenth position on the SNS list and was re-elected when the list won forty-one seats. He was chosen for a second term as speaker when the new assembly convened.
