= Bronisława Kowalska =

Polish politician (1955–2020)

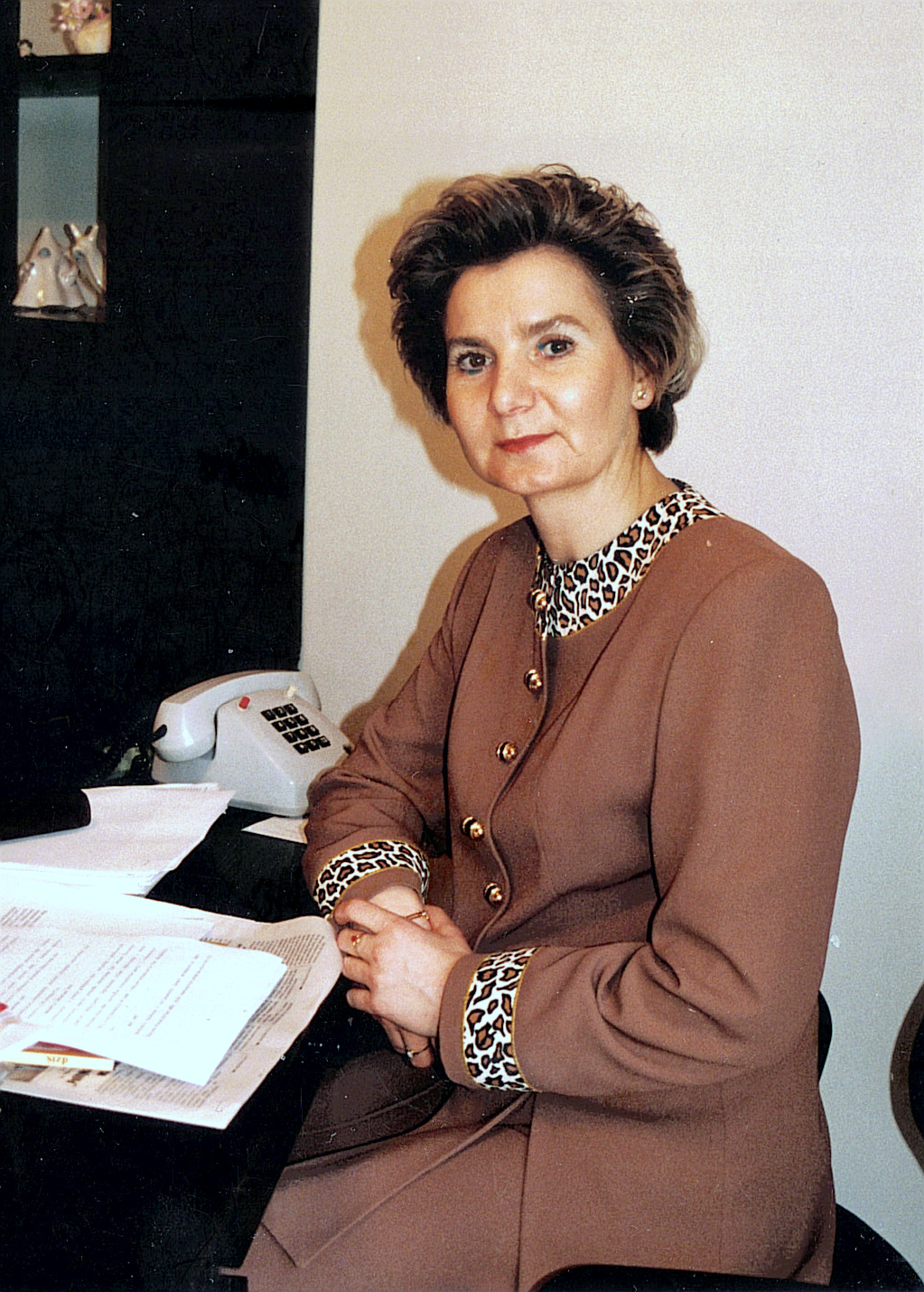
Kowalska in 1997

Bronisława Kowalska (5 December 1955 – 26 December 2020) was a Polish politician.

== Biography ==
Born in Starachowice, Poland, she served as a Deputy from 1993 to 2005 and as a MEP in 2004. She was a member of the Democratic Left Alliance.

Kowalska, who had leukemia, died from COVID-19 in Kielce amid the COVID-19 pandemic in Poland, 21 days after her 65th birthday.
