= Bronislav =

- Gender: masculine

Origin
- Language: Slavic
- Meaning: "defender of the glory"

Other names
- Short form: Brano
- Derived: borna (to protect, to defend) and slava (glory, fame)
- Related names: Bronislava (f), Bronisław, Branislav, Branimir, Bronislovas

Bronislav is a Slavic masculine given name, derived from the Slavic elements borna ("to protect, to defend") and slava ("glory, fame"), thus meaning "defender of the glory". It is the Czech, Ukrainian and Russian form of the name Branislav.

The feminine form of the name is Bronislava.

Notable people with the name include:

- Bronislav Bechyňský (1962–2011), Czech sport shooter
- Bronislav Červenka (born 1975), Czech football player and manager
- Bronislav Danda (1930–2015), Czech ice hockey player
- Bronislav Gimpel (1911–1979), Polish-American violinist and teacher
- Bronislav Grombchevsky (1855–1926), Polish-Russian army officer and explorer
- Bronislav Kaminski (1899–1944), Soviet Nazi collaborator
- Bronislav Poloczek (1939–2012), Polish-Czech theatre and television actor
- Bronislav Snetkov (born 1967), Russian speed skater
- Bronislav Stáňa (born 1993), Czech footballer

== See also ==
- Bronislava, feminine form of the name
- Bronisław (given name)
- Branislav
- Slavic names
