= Branislav Damjanov =

Serbian politician (born 1965)

Branislav Damjanov (Serbian Cyrillic: Бранислав Дамјанов; born 20 August 1965) is a Serbian politician. He was the mayor of Nova Crnja from 2000 to 2004 and served in the Vojvodina provincial assembly from 2008 to 2016. During his time as an elected official, Damjanov was a member of the Democratic Party (DS).

== Early life and career ==
Damjanov was born in the village of Srpska Crnja in the municipality of Nova Crnja, in what was then the Autonomous Province of Vojvodina in the Socialist Republic of Serbia, Socialist Federal Republic of Yugoslavia. He graduated from the University of Novi Sad Faculty of Agriculture in 1990 as an agricultural engineer.

== Politician ==
=== Early years in municipal office (1996–2008) ===
Damjanov was first elected to the Nova Crnja municipal assembly in the 1996 Serbian local elections. The Democratic Party contested this electoral cycle as part of the Zajedno coalition, which won seven out of twenty-six seats in Nova Crnja, finishing second against the Socialist Party of Serbia (SPS).

He was re-elected in the 2000 local elections, which the DS contested as part of the Democratic Opposition of Serbia (DOS) coalition. The DOS won a majority victory in Nova Crnja with fourteen seats; Damjanov was chosen afterward as assembly speaker, an office that was at the time equivalent to mayor, and served in this role for the next four years.

Serbia introduced the direct election of mayors and a system of proportional representation for local assembly elections in 2004. Damjanov did not seek re-election as mayor but led the DS list for the Nova Crnja assembly and was re-elected when the list won five seats. The election resulted in a divided government: the far-right Serbian Radical Party (SRS) won the mayoral election but could not command a majority of seats in the assembly, and the local government was dominated by the DS. Damjanov was not a member of the local administration but supported it in the assembly. the direct election of mayors proved to be a short-lived experiment and was discarded with the 2008 local election cycle.

=== Provincial representative (2008–16) ===
Vojvodina held the 2008 provincial election under a system of mixed proportional representation, with half the members elected for single-member constituency seats. The DS contested the election as the main party in the For a European Vojvodina alliance; Damjanov was the Democratic Party's candidate in the Nova Crnja constituency and was elected in the second round of voting. For a European Vojvodina won a majority of seats, and Damjanov served as a government supporter.

He also led the For a European Vojvodina list for Nova Crnja in the 2008 local elections. The alliance won a plurality victory with eight seats and led a local coalition government; Damjanov was chosen as the municipality's deputy mayor.

Damjanov was re-elected for Nova Crnja in the 2012 provincial election. The DS's alliance won a strong plurality victory and afterward formed a new coalition government; Damjanov again served as a government supporter and was a member of the privatization committee and the agriculture committee. He also appeared in the second position on the DS list for Nova Crnja in the 2012 local elections and was re-elected when the list won eleven seats.

Vojvodina switched to a system of full proportional representation with the 2016 provincial election. Damjanov appeared in the forty-fourth position on the DS's list and was not re-elected when the list fell to only ten seats. In the concurrent 2016 local election in Nova Crnja, he appeared in the seventh position on the DS's list and was not re-elected when the list fell to two seats.

=== Since 2016 ===
After the 2024 Serbian local elections, Damjanov was appointed as advisor to the Nova Crnja local government on agriculture and environmental protection.

== Electoral record ==
=== Provincial (Vojvodina) ===
2012 Vojvodina provincial election: Nova Crnja
Candidate	Party	First round		Second round	
Candidate	Party	Votes	%	Votes	%
Branislav Damjanov (incumbent)	"Choice for a Better Vojvodina–Bojan Pajtic" (Affiliation: Democratic Party)	2,096	34.72	2,677	54.16
Mile Todorov Štuka	Socialist Party of Serbia (SPS), Party of United Pensioners of Serbia (PUPS), United Serbia (JS), Social Democratic Party of Serbia (SDP Serbia) (Affiliation: Socialist Party of Serbia)	1,202	19.91	2,266	45.84
Cvijan Milošević	Let's Get Vojvodina Moving–Tomislav Nikolić (Serbian Progressive Party, New Serbia, Movement of Socialists, Strength of Serbia Movement) (Affiliation: Serbian Progressive Party)	823	13.63		
Tibor Daruši	Alliance of Vojvodina Hungarians	749	12.41		
Dejan Stojanović	United Regions of Serbia–Dejan Stojanović	609	10.09		
Jovan Vukmirović	Serbian Radical Party	557	9.23		
Total		6,036	100.00	4,943	100.00

2008 Vojvodina provincial election: Nova Crnja
Candidate	Party	First round		Second round	
Candidate	Party	Votes	%	Votes	%
Branislav Damjanov	For a European Vojvodina Democratic Party–G17 Plus Boris Tadić (Affiliation: Democratic Party)	1,652	25.89	2,754	57.69
Risto Komnenović	Socialist Party of Serbia (SPS), Party of United Pensioners of Serbia (PUPS) (Affiliation: Socialist Party of Serbia)	1,211	18.98	2,020	42.31
Dragiša Latinović	Christian Democratic Party of Serbia	1,187	18.61		
Milenko Vujović	Serbian Radical Party	1,017	15.94		
Attila Juhász	Hungarian Coalition–István Pásztor (Affiliation: Alliance of Vojvodina Hungarians)	921	14.44		
Emilija Putnik	Democratic Party of Serbia–New Serbia Dr. Vojislav Koštunica (Affiliation: Democratic Party of Serbia)	392	6.14		
Total		6,380	100.00	4,774	100.00
Valid votes		6,380	96.36	4,774	97.87
Invalid/blank votes		241	3.64	104	2.13
Total votes		6,621	100.00	4,878	100.00
