= Bronisława, Greater Poland Voivodeship =

Bronisława
- Village
- Location within Poland
- Coordinates: 52°22′N 18°30′E
- Country: Poland
- Voivodeship: Greater Poland
- County: Konin
- Gmina: Sompolno

Bronisława (Polish pronunciation: [brɔɲiˈswava]) is a village in the administrative district of Gmina Sompolno, within Konin County, Greater Poland Voivodeship, in west-central Poland.
