= Branislav Hronec =

Slovak composer, pianist and conductor (1940–2022)

- Born: 22 December 1940; Hronsek, Banská Bystrica District, Slovak Republic
- Died: 25 October 2022 (aged 81)
- Other names: Braňo Hronec

Branislav Hronec (22 December 1940 – 25 October 2022) was a Slovak composer, pianist and conductor.

== Life and career ==
Born in Hronsek, the son of an evangelical minister, Hronec started playing organ at 13 years old. He later studied piano and conducting at the Bratislava Conservatory and conducting and composition at the Academy of Performing Arts under Alexander Moyzes.

After experiences with the ensembles West Coast Combo and Bratislava Jazz Studio, in 1963 he founded the Braň Hronec Group, which later was renamed Braň Hronec Orchestra; with this ensemble he toured extensively nationally and abroad, in Europe, Central Asia and Cuba. The orchestra disbanded in 1981, with Hronec focusing on composition for television and theatre, and becoming in the second half of the 1980s music director at Slovak Radio and conductor of the Dance Orchestra of the Czechoslovak Television.

Hronec composed over 300 songs and compositions, including the first big beat song, the first twist song and the first disco song produced in Czechoslovakia. He often collaborated with lyricist Milan Lasica. Between 1990 and 1997 he was professor at the Academy of Performing Arts. He died on 25 October 2022 at the age of 81. He was married to the actress Judita Varga since 1980.
