= Branislava Peruničić =

Bosnian academic (1936–2025)

Branislava Peruničić-Draženović
- Born: Branislava Peruničić; 10 July 1936; Pančevo, Kingdom of Yugoslavia
- Died: 17 March 2025 (aged 88)
- Education: University of Sarajevo; University of Belgrade
- Known for: Control engineering
- Scientific career
- Workplaces: University of Sarajevo; University of Illinois at Urbana–Champaign; Texas A&M University; Lamar University

Branislava Peruničić-Draženović (10 July 1936 – 17 March 2025) was a Bosnian academic who was Emeritus Professor of Control Engineering at the University of Sarajevo who was elected to the Academy of Sciences and Arts of Bosnia and Herzegovina in 1986.

== Background ==
Peruničić studied engineering at the University of Belgrade. She earned her bachelor's degree in 1960 and her master's degree in 1966. During this time, she worked as an instructor in the Department of Electrical Engineering. She moved to the University of Sarajevo for her doctoral studies, which she completed in 1971. During her studies she worked at the Institute of Control Problems in Moscow. She was immediately appointed an assistant professor.

Peruničić died on 17 March 2025, at the age of 88.

== Research and career ==
Alongside her studies Peruničić worked as a Project Leader at Energoinvest until 1970. She was promoted to Professor at the University of Sarajevo in 1976. She was Fulbright visiting scholar in 1981. She held visiting positions at the University of Illinois at Urbana–Champaign and Texas A&M University. Her research has considered both variable structure control and sliding mode control. In 1993, Peruničić joined Lamar University, where she worked as a Professor in the College of Engineering.

In 2009, she was elected vice president of the Academy of Sciences and Arts of Bosnia and Herzegovina. She served on the University of Sarajevo Council for Science and Arts.

=== Selected publications ===
Her publications include.

- Peruničić-Draženović, Branislava (1969). "The invariance conditions in variable structure systems". Automatica. 5 (3): 287–295. doi:10.1016/0005-1098(69)90071-5.
- Peruničić-Draženović, Branislava (1996). "Automated transmission line fault analysis using synchronized sampling at two ends". IEEE Transactions on Power Systems. 11: 441–447. doi:10.1109/59.486131.
- Peruničić-Draženović, Branislava (1994). "An accurate fault location algorithm using synchronized sampling". Electric Power Systems Research. 29: 441–447.
