= Branko =

Slavic masculine given name

- Gender: masculine

Origin
- Language: Slavic

Other names
- Related names: Branka (f), Branislav, Branimir

Branko (Cyrillic script: Бранко; Serbo-Croatian pronunciation: [brâːŋko]) is a South Slavic masculine given name found in all of the former Yugoslavia. It is a shortened form of the names Branimir and Branislav, and the female equivalent is Branka. It is also occasionally a nickname.

Notable people with this name include:

== B ==
- Branko Babić (born 1947), Serbian football manager
- Branko Bačić (born 1959), Croatian politician
- Branko Bajić (born 1998), Bosnian footballer
- Branko Baković (born 1981), Serbian footballer
- Branko Baletić (born 1946), Serbian-Montenegrin film director and producer
- Branko Bauer (1921–2002), Croatian film director
- Branko Becić (1923–2000), Croatian rower
- Branko Bedekovič (born 1973), Slovenian handball player
- Branko Belačić (1929–2008), Croatian rower
- Branko Benzon (1903–1970), Croatian physician, diplomat and politician
- Branko Bogunović (1911–1945), Serbian military officer
- Branko Bokun (1920–2011), Yugoslav-British author and journalist
- Branko Bošković (born 1980), Montenegrin footballer
- Branko Bošnjak (1923–1996), Croatian philosopher
- Branko Bošnjak (footballer) (born 1955), Yugoslav footballer
- Branko Bošnjaković (born 1939), Dutch-Croatian physicist
- Branko Božović (born 1969), Serbian football player and manager
- Branko Brkic (born 1962), Serbian-South African editor and publisher
- Branko Brnović (born 1967), Montenegrin football manager
- Branko Bulatović (1951–2004), Montenegrin football administrator
- Branko Buljevic (born 1947), Australian-Croatian footballer

== C ==
- Branko Čalović (1941–1995), Yugoslav footballer
- Branko Celler, Australian academic
- Branko Cikatić (1955–2020), Croatian martial artist
- Branko Ćopić (1915–1984), Yugoslav writer
- Branko Črnac Tusta (1955–2012), Croatian musician
- Branko Crvenkovski (born 1962), Macedonian politician
- Branko Čubrilo (born 1988), Croatian footballer
- Branko Culina (born 1957), Croatian-Australian football player and coach
- Branko Čulina (born 1957), Croatian-Australian football manager
- Branko Cvejić (1946–2022), Serbian actor
- Branko Cvetković (born 1984), Bosnian basketball player
- Branko Cvetkovič (born 1951), Slovenian photographer

== D ==
- Branko Damljanović (born 1961), Serbian chess grandmaster
- Branko Dangubić (1922–2002), Serbian javelin thrower
- Branko Davidović (born 1959), Serbian footballer
- Branko Đerić (born 1948), Bosnian Serb politician
- Branko Despot (born 1942), Croatian philosopher
- Branko Dobrosavljević (1886–1941), Serbian hieromartyr and saint
- Branko Dolhar (born 1949), Slovenian ski jumper
- Branko Dragutinović (born 1961), Bosnian footballer
- Branko Đurić (born 1962), Bosnian actor
- Branko Đurić (tennis) (born 2005), Serbian tennis player

== E ==
- Branko Elsner (1929–2012), Slovenian football manager

== F ==
- Branko Filip (born 1975), Slovenian cyclist
- Branko Fučić (1920–1999), Croatian art historian, archeologist and paleographer

== G ==
- Branko Galoić (born 1973), Croatian musician
- Branko Gavella (1885–1962), Croatian theatre director, critic and essayist
- Branko Geroski, Macedonian journalist
- Branko Gradišnik (born 1951), Slovenian writer and translator
- Branko Grahovac (born 1983), Bosnian footballer
- Branko Gračanin (born 1943), Croatian footballer
- Branko Grims (born 1962), Slovenian politician
- Branko Grünbaum (1929–2018), Croatian-American mathematician

== H ==
- Branko Hofman (1929–1991), Slovenian poet, writer and playwright
- Branko Horjak (born 1950), Slovenian football player and manager
- Branko Horvat (1928–2003), Croatian economist and politician
- Branko Hrg (born 1961), Croatian politician
- Branko Hucika (born 1977), Croatian footballer

== I ==
- Branko Ilič (born 1983), Slovenian footballer
- Branko Isaković (born 1958), Serbian bass player, producer and composer
- Branko Ištvančić (born 1967), Croatian film director
- Branko Ivanda (1941–2025), Croatian film director and screenwriter
- Branko Ivanković (born 1954), Croatian football manager

== J ==
- Branko Jelić (born 1977), Serbian footballer
- Branko Jeren (born 1951), Croatian university professor and politician
- Branko Jorović (born 1981), Serbian basketball player and coach
- Branko Jovanović (1868–1921), Serbian army general
- Branko Jovičić (born 1993), Serbian footballer

== K ==
- Branko Kadija (1921–1942), Albanian communist of Serbian descent
- Branko Kallay (1908–1995), Croatian athlete
- Branko Kankaraš (born 1988), Serbian-Montenegrin handball player
- Branko Karačić (born 1960), Croatian football manager
- Branko Klenkovski (1946–2013), Yugoslav footballer
- Branko Kokir (born 1974), Serbian handball player
- Branko Kopjar, Croatian-American physician and epidemiologist
- Branko Kostić (1939–2020), Montenegrin politician
- Branko Kovačević (born 1951), Serbian academic
- Branko Kovačević (basketball) (born 1951), Serbian basketball player
- Branko Kovačević (volleyball) (born 1967), Serbian volleyball coach
- Branko Kralj (1924–2012), Croatian footballer
- Branko Krga (born 1945), Serbian military officer
- Branko Krsmanović (1915–1941), Yugoslav soldier

== L ==
- Branko Laura (born 1982), Croatian futsal player
- Branko Lazarević (born 1984), Serbian footballer
- Branko Lazarević (critic) (1883–1963), Serbian writer, literary critic and diplomat
- Branko Lazić (born 1989), Serbian basketball player
- Branko Lukovac (1944–2023), Montenegrin politician
- Branko Lustig (1932–2019), Croatian film producer

== M ==
- Branko Maksimović (born 1974), Serbian basketball coach
- Branko Mamula (1921–2021), Yugoslav officer and politician
- Branko Manoilovski (born 1941), Macedonian politician
- Branko Marinković (born 1967), Bolivian-Croatian politician and businessman
- Branko Marjanović (1909–1996), Yugoslav film director and editor
- Branislav Martinović (1937–2015), Serbian wrestler
- Branko Marušič (1938–2026), Slovenian historian
- Branko Mataja (1923–2000), Serbian–American folk and blues musician
- Aleksandër Branko Merxhani (1894–1981), Albanian sociologist, writer and journalist
- Branko Mihajlović (born 1991), Serbian footballer
- Branko Mihaljević (1931–2005), Croatian composer
- Branko Mikasinovich (academic) (born 1938), Serbian American scholar of Yugoslav and Serbian literature
- Branko Mikašinović (politician) (1924–1999), Yugoslav and Serbian diplomat and politician
- Branko Mikulić (1928–1994), Yugoslav politician
- Branko Mikša (born 1947), Croatian politician
- Branko Milanović (born 1953), Serbian-American economist
- Branko Milisavljević (born 1976), Serbian basketball player
- Branko Milićević (born 1946), Serbian actor
- Branko Miljković (1934–1961), Serbian poet
- Branko Miljuš (born 1960), Croatian footballer
- Branko Milosevic (born 1964), Croatian-Australian footballer
- Branko Milovanović (born 1973), Serbian footballer
- Branko Mirković (born 1982), Serbian-Bulgarian basketball player
- Branko Mitrovic, Serbian-Norwegian architectural historian
- Branko Mladenović (fl. 1355), Serbian magnate

== N ==
- Branko Nadoveza (1950–1970), Serbian footballer
- Branko Nešić (born 1934), Serbian-American basketball player
- Branko Nešović (1930–2002), Serbian footballer and medical doctor
- Branko Ninić (born 1974), Serbian politician

== O ==
- Branko Oblak (born 1947), Slovenian footballer
- Branko Ojdanić born 1990), Bosnian footballer
- Branko Okić (born 1969), Bosnian footballer
- Branko Ostojić (born 1984), Bosnian footballer

== P ==
- Branko Panić (born 1977), Croatian footballer
- Branko Pauljević (born 1989), Serbian footballer
- Branko Pavlović (born 1960), Serbian politician and lawyer
- Branko Peković (born 1979), Serbian water polo player
- Branko Pešić (1922–1986), Serbian politician
- Branko Petranović (1927–1994), Serbian historian
- Branko Pintarič (born 1967), Slovenian writer and actor
- Branko Plavšić (1949–2011), Serbian comic book artist
- Branko Pleša (1926–2001), Serbian actor and theatre director
- Branko Pleše (1915–1980), Croatian footballer
- Branko Popović (painter) (1882–1944), Serbian painter
- Branko Popović (politician) (born 1975), Serbian medical doctor and politician

== R ==
- Branko Radaković (1982–2018), Serbian actor and director
- Branko Radivojević (born 1980), Slovak ice hockey player
- Branko Radičević (1924–1953), Serbian poet
- Branko Radovanović (born 1981), Serbian footballer
- Branko Radović (basketball) (1933–1993), Yugoslav basketball player and coach
- Branko Radović (footballer, born 1950), Montenegrin football player and manager
- Branko Radulović (1881–1916), Serbian painter
- Branko Ranković (born 1971), Serbian politician
- Branko Rasić (born 1976), Serbian footballer
- Branko Rastislalić (died 1352), Serbian medieval ruler
- Branko Rašović (born 1942), Montenegrin footballer
- Branko Ružić (politician) (born 1975), Serbian politician
- Branko Ružić (sculptor) (1919–1997), Croatian sculptor

== S ==
- Branko Savić (born 1972), Serbian footballer
- Branko Schmidt (born 1957), Croatian film director
- Branimir Branko Segota (born 1961), Croatian-Canadian soccer player
- Branko Skroče (born 1955), Croatian basketball player
- Branko Smiljanić (born 1957), Serbian football manager
- Branko Sobot (born 1972), Croatian boxer
- Branko Souček (1930–2014), Croatian academic and computer scientist
- Branko Špoljar (1914–1985), Yugoslav actor
- Branko Stanković (1921–2000), Bosnian football player and manager
- Branko Stanovnik (born 1938), Slovenian chemist
- Branko Stinčić (1922–2001), Croatian footballer
- Branko Štrbac (born 1957), Yugoslav handball player
- Branko Strupar (born 1970), Croatian-Belgian footballer
- Branko Švarc (1894–1972), Croatian judge

== T ==
- Branko Tanazević (1876–1945), Serbian architect
- Branko de Tellería (born 1991), Argentinian footballer
- Branko Tomović (born 1980), Serbian-German actor
- Branko Tošović (born 1949), Austrian-Serbian philologist, linguist and literary scholar
- Branko Trajkov (born 1966), Croatian musician
- Branko Tretinjak (1907–1989), Yugoslav fencer
- Branko Tucak (born 1952), Croatian football manager

== V ==
- Branko Ve Poljanski, pseudonym of Serbian poet and painter Branislav Micić (1898–1947)
- Branko Vidović (1923–2013), Croatian swimmer
- Branko Vodnik (1879–1926), Croatian literary historian
- Branko Vrgoč (born 1989), Croatian footballer
- Branko Vujović (born 1998), Montenegrin handball player
- Branko Vukelić (1958–2013), Croatian politician
- Branko Vukelić (spy) (1904–1945), Yugoslav spy
- Branko Vukićević (born 1961), Serbian basketball player

== Z ==
- Branko Zebec (1929–1988), Croatian football player and manager
- Branko Žigić (born 1981), Serbian professional football player and coach
- Branko Ziherl (1916–1942), Slovenian diver
- Branko Zinaja (1895–1949), Croatian footballer
- Branko Zorko (born 1967), Croatian runner
- Branko Zupan (born 1964), Slovenian football player and manager

== No surname ==
- Branko (čelnik) (fl. 1306–19), Serbian nobleman

== See also ==
- Branko's Bridge, bridge in Belgrade, Serbia
- Brankov, surname
- Branković, surname
- Brankovina, village in Serbia
- Brankovići (Rogatica), village in Bosnia
