= Branko Cvetkovic =

Branko Cvetkovic may refer to:

- Branko Cvetkovič (born 1951), Slovenian photographer
- Branko Cvetković (born 1984), Bosnian basketball player
