= Florian Kreuzwirth =

Austrian footballer

Personal information
- Date of birth: 11 July 1987
- Height: 1.84 m (6 ft 0 in)
- Position: Goalkeeper

Senior career*
Years	Team	Apps	(Gls)
2006–2008	SC Schwanenstadt		
2008–2009	1. FC Vöcklabruck		
2009	SV Grödig		
2011–2012	TSV St. Johann		
2012–2013	SV Wals-Grünau		
2013–2014	TSV St. Johann		
- * Club domestic league appearances and goals

Florian Kreuzwirth (born 11 July 1987) is an Austrian football goalkeeper. After his active career, he moved to personnel consultant Robert Half and, as Regional Managing Director Executive Search Germany & Switzerland, places executives in companies.
