= Zupan =

Zupan is an English rendering of the following Slavic words:

- Župan, an administrative title in South Slavic languages
- Żupan, a Polish garment
- Zupan (surname)
