= Nick Zangwill =

British philosopher and honorary research professor (born 1957)

- Born: 1957 (age 68–69)

Education
- Education: London University (PhD)

Philosophical work
- Era: Contemporary philosophy, Analytic Philosophy
- Region: Western philosophy
- Institutions: University College London, The University of Hull, and the University of Lincoln
- Main interests: Aesthetics, metaphysics, epistemology, philosophy of mind, philosophy of logic, meta-ethics

Nick Zangwill (born 1957) is a British philosopher and honorary research professor at University College London and the University of Lincoln. He is known for his expertise on moral philosophy, especially metaethics, and aesthetics, especially the philosophy of music and visual art.

He has also written on metaphysics, epistemology, the philosophy of mind, and logic.

== Background ==
In metaethics, Zangwill has defended non-naturalism, with a special attention to dependence of morality on natural properties. He has defended externalism about moral motivation, developed aspects of expressivism, and defended non-consequentialist theory.

In aesthetics, Zangwill has defined his position as 'moderate formalism' in art as referring to those properties "that are determined solely by sensory or physical properties—so long as the physical properties in question are not relations to other things and other times". The philosopher and architect Branko Mitrovic has defined formalism in art and architecture as "the doctrine that states that the aesthetic qualities of works of visual art derive from the visual and spatial properties".

== Philosophical views ==
=== On meat eating ===
Zangwill has criticized animal rights and vegetarianism and has stated that "vegetarians and vegans are the natural enemies of domesticated animals that are bred to be eaten". In his 2021 paper Our Moral Duty to Eat Meat which was published in the Journal of the American Philosophical Association, Zangwill argues that the existence of domesticated animals depends on the practice of eating them, and that meat eating has historically benefitted many millions of animals and given them good lives. Consequently, he claims that eating non-human animal meat is not merely permissible but also good for many millions of animals. However, Zangwill clarifies that this argument does not apply to factory farm animals, as they do not have good lives. Thus, when he speaks of meat eating being justified, he means only meat from animals that overall have a good life. Zangwill has commented that "I think a lot of the domesticated animals lives are a lot better than your average animal lives. They're waited on by human beings, they don't have to do much. We get rid of their predators. We provide them food, we provide them even romance."

Gregory Tague has authored a reply to Zangwill, commenting that he is invoking human exceptionalism and ignores developments in animal cognition, extensive animal suffering and ecological damage caused by animal agriculture. Other replies to Zangwill were authored by David Benatar in Public Affairs Quarterly and Adrian Kreutz in the Journal of Animal Ethics.

=== Philosophy of music ===
In the 21st century, philosophers such as Zangwill have extended the study of aesthetics in music, as studied in the 20th century by scholars such as Jerrold Levinson and Peter Kivy. In his 2015 book on the aesthetics of music titled Music and Aesthetic Reality: Formalism and the Limits of Description, Zangwill introduces his realist position by stating, "By 'realism' about musical experience, I mean a view that foregrounds the aesthetic properties of music and our experience of these properties: musical experience is an awareness of an array of sounds and of the aesthetic properties that they determine. Our experience is directed onto the sound structure and its aesthetic properties. This is the content of musical experience."

=== Philosophy of mind ===
Zangwill defends a particular 'weak' version of the idea that the mental is essentially normative, as well as the anomalism of the mental.

=== Philosophy of logic ===
Zangwill defends realism about logic and attacks inferentialism.

== Selected publications ==
- The Metaphysics of Beauty (Cornell UP, 2001)
- Aesthetic Creation (Oxford UP, 2007)
- Music and Aesthetic Reality: Formalism and the Limits of Description (Routledge, 2015)
- Scruton's Aesthetics (ed., with Andy Hamilton) (Palgrave Macmillan, 2012)
- "Our Moral Duty to Eat Meat" (Journal of the American Philosophical Association, 2021)
