= Brankov =

Brankov (feminine: Brankova) is a patronymic surname of South Slavic origin, meaning "child of Branko". Notable people with the surname include:

- Plamen Brankov (born 1949), Bulgarian water polo player
- Slavko Brankov (1951–2006), Croatian actor
- Tena Nemet Brankov (born 1994), Croatian actress
- Zhana Bergendorff (née Brankova; born 1985), Bulgarian singer and songwriter
