= Viennacontemporary =

International art fair in Vienna, Austria

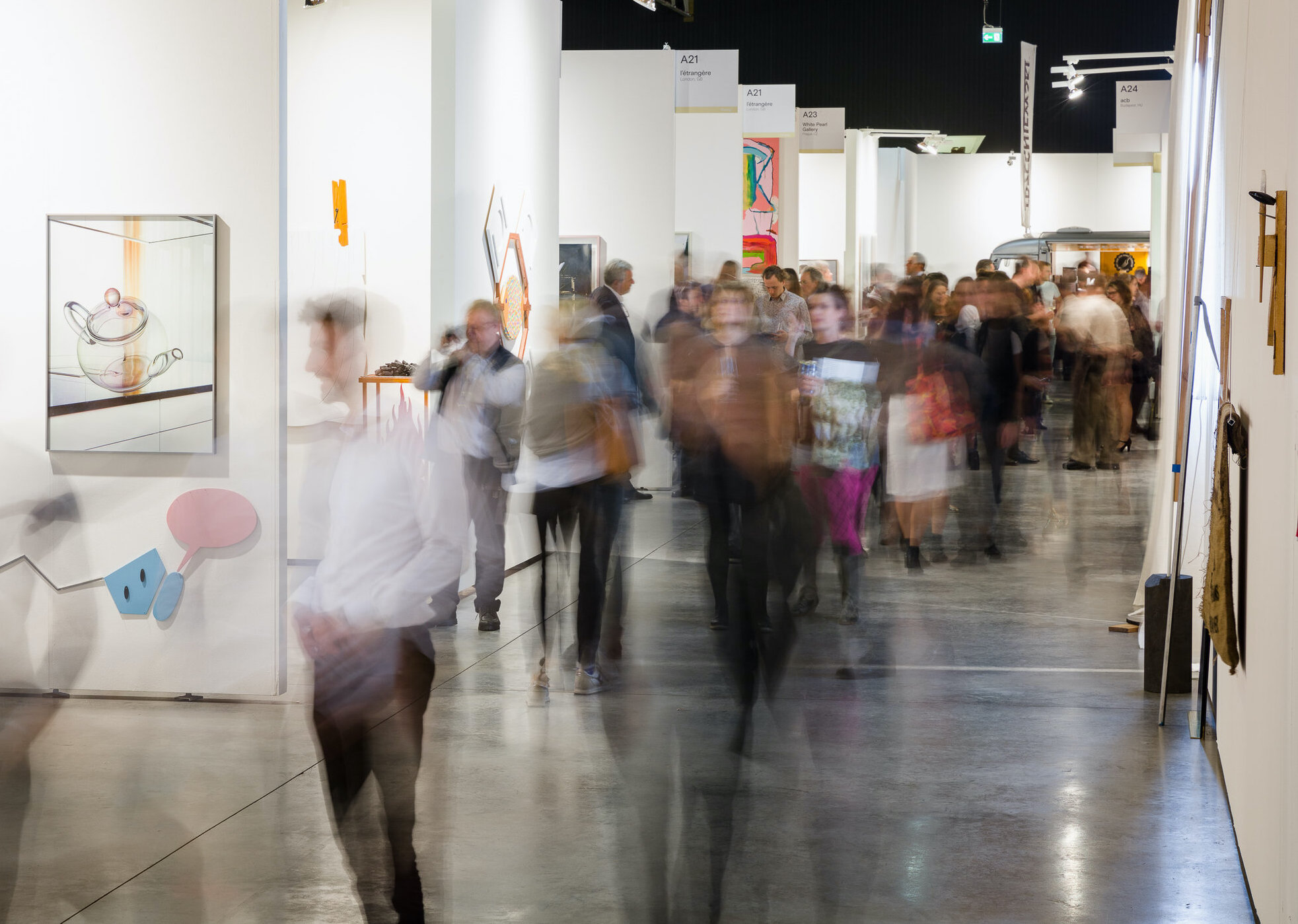
viennacontemporary 2019, exhibition view. Photography: kunst-dokumentation.com

viennacontemporary is an international fair for contemporary art in Vienna, Austria. From 2015 to 2020 it took place annually in the fourth week of September at the Marx Halle, located in St. Marx, a part of Vienna's third district. In 2021, the fair took place at Neue Alte Post in Vienna. Since 2022, viennacontemporary regularly takes place in September in Kursalon Vienna in Stadtpark in the center of Vienna. Besides its focus on Central- and Eastern Europe, viennacontemporary presents international and Austrian galleries showcasing young and established positions of contemporary art.

The art fair is accompanied by a series of supporting events, which take place in cooperation with Austrian museums and other art institutions and aim to promote and strengthen Vienna's importance as a center for contemporary art and culture.

Every year, viennacontemporary attracts several thousand visitors, including many international stakeholders of the art world. In 2023 viennacontemporary took place from September 7-10 at Kursalon Vienna.

In January 2026, the end of viennacontemporary "in its usual form" due to a lack of financing was announced.

== Background ==
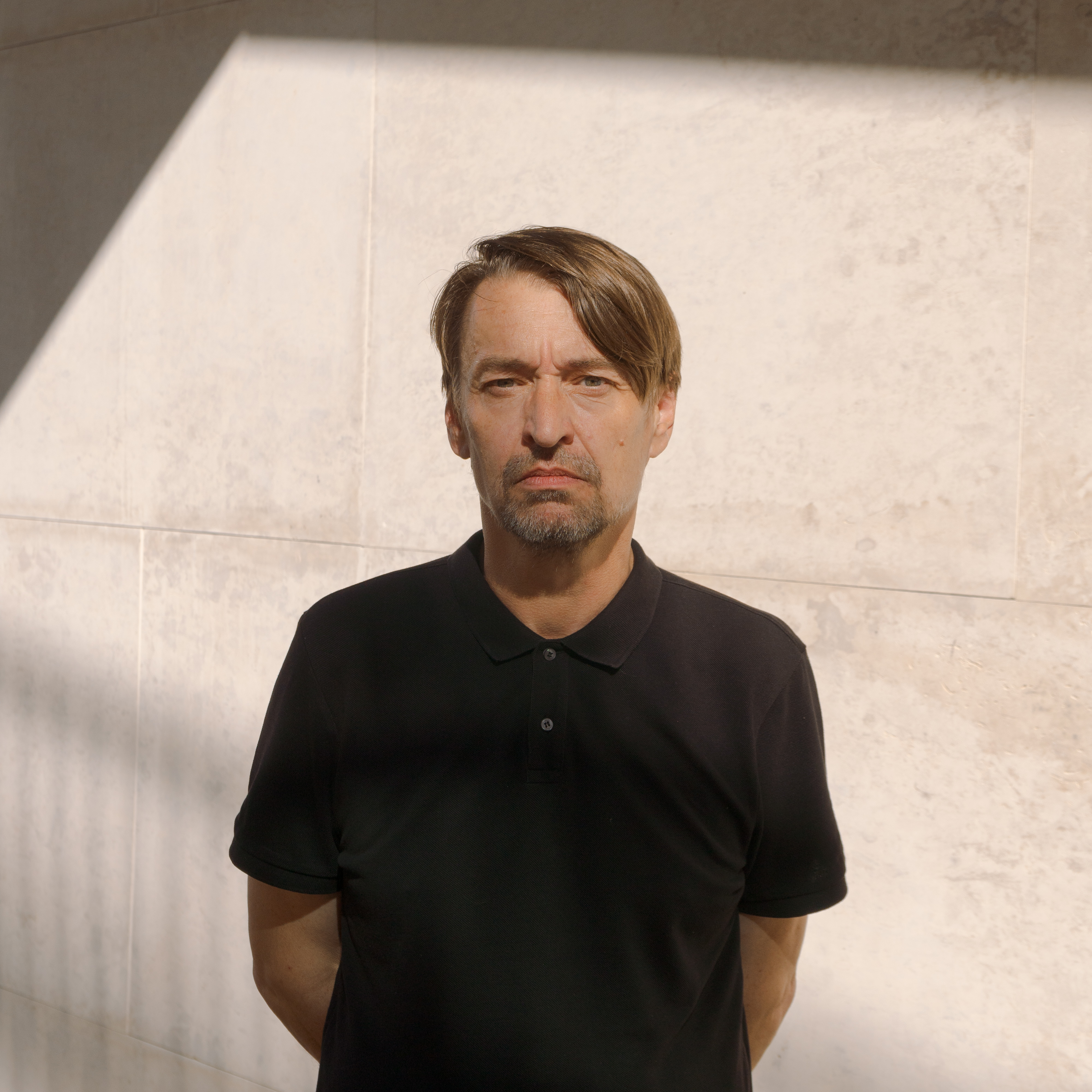
Boris Ondreička, Artistic Director of viennacontemporary since 2021

In 2012, the team surrounding chairman of the Board Dmitry Aksenov, managing director Renger van den Heuvel, and the two artistic directors Christina Steinbrecher-Pfandt and Vita Zaman organized VIENNAFAIR, a fair for contemporary art in Vienna. In 2014, Vita Zaman left the team. In 2015 the fair rebranded as viennacontemporary and moved to Marx Halle. Christina Steinbrecher-Pfandt served as artistic director from 2015 to 2018. In 2019, the fair appointed Johanna Chromik as the new artistic director.

In 2021, Boris Ondreička followed as the fair's new artistic director.

In April 2022, it was announced that Dmitry Aksenov will lay down his position as Chairman of the Board.

== Location ==
Built in 1865 in Italian Neo-Renaissance style, Kursalon Vienna is one of the most impressive buildings in the inner city of Vienna. Its magnificent halls provide a grand setting for contemporary art, highlighting Vienna's unique interplay of a historic legacy and a thriving young creative scene. The classical building underscores the fair's function as a networking platform that brings together tradition and progression, East and West, as well as art enthusiasts, selected galleries and renowned art experts from around the world for a brilliant week in the name of contemporary art. For the guests of viennacontemporary, the new venue in the heart of the city offers a unique, enjoyable art experience due to its proximity to many great galleries, renowned museums, charming cafés, important cultural institutions, and architectural highlights of the Austrian capital.
