= Formalism (art) =

Study of art by analyzing and comparing form and style

In art history, formalism is the study of art by analyzing and comparing form and style. Its discussion also includes the way objects are made and their purely visual or material aspects. In painting, formalism emphasizes compositional elements such as color, line, shape, texture, and other perceptual aspects rather than content, meaning, or the historical and social context. At its extreme, formalism in art history posits that everything necessary to comprehending a work of art is contained within the work of art. The context of the work, including the reason for its creation, the historical background, and the life of the artist, that is, its conceptual aspect is considered to be external to the artistic medium itself, and therefore of secondary importance.

== History ==
The historical origin of the modern form of the question of aesthetic formalism is usually dated to Immanuel Kant and the writing of his third Critique where Kant states: "Every form of the objects of sense is either figure (Gestalt) or play (Spiel). In the latter case it is either play of figures or the mere play of sensations. The charm (Reiz) of colors... may be added, but the delineations (Zeichnung) in the... composition (Komposition)... constitute the proper object of the pure judgment of taste." The philosopher Donald Crawford has summarized Kant's position stating: "Thus, for Kant, form consists of the spatial... organization of elements: figure, shape, or delineation... In the parts of the Critique of Judgment in which form is emphasized as the essential aspect of beauty, Kant is consistently a pure formalist."

== Contemporary definition ==
Nick Zangwill has defined formalism in art as referring to those properties "that are determined solely by sensory or physical properties—so long as the physical properties in question are not relations to other things and other times." The philosopher and architect Branko Mitrovic has defined formalism in art and architecture as "the doctrine that states that the aesthetic qualities of works of visual art derive from the visual and spatial properties."

According to the observation that works of art can in general contain formal properties and nonformal properties, the philosopher Nick Zangwill has delineated three types of formalism encountered at the turn of the 21st century. First, Zangwill identifies extreme formalists who think "that all works of art are purely formal works—where a work is purely formal if all its aesthetic properties are formal aesthetic properties," then he defines anti-formalist thinkers as those who "think that no works of art have formal aesthetic properties." The third type which Zangwill identifies as representing the transition of the philosophy of aesthetics into the 21st century is that of moderate formalism, where its principal exponents defend the principle "that all the aesthetic properties of works of art in a select class are formal, and second, that although many works of art outside that class have nonformal aesthetic properties, many of those works also have important formal aesthetic properties that must not be ignored."

The philosopher Michalle Gal has offered a moderate version of formalism, entitled "Deep Formalism", which is a symbolic formalism based on philosophical aestheticism. The artwork is defined by her as deep form: "a form steeped in content that cannot be extracted from it. Artistic content, since it has no existence or sense apart from the form, cannot actually be referred to, other than speculatively. The content seals the form in an opaque, non-reflective, productive symbol." Here she introduces a broad concept of symbol, an opaque-productive symbol: one that is not transparent to preconceived or predetermined referents and meanings, but rather produces new ones.

== Uses in art history ==
A formal analysis is an academic method in art history and criticism for analyzing works of art: "In order to perceive style, and understand it, art historians use 'formal analysis'. This means they describe things very carefully. These descriptions, which may include subjective vocabulary, are always accompanied by illustrations so that there can be no doubt about what exists objectively".

== Formalism in other disciplines ==
- Formalism (literature)
- Formalism (music)
- Formalism (philosophy)
- New Formalism
- Progressive music
- Russian formalism

== See also ==
- Abstract expressionism
- Josef Albers
- Color field painting
- Elements of art
- Geometric abstraction
- Hard-edge painting
- Lyrical Abstraction
- Minimalism
- Op Art
- Post-modernism
- Post-painterly abstraction
- Washington Color School

== Sources ==
- Bell, Clive. Art. New York: Frederick A. Stokes Company Publishers. 1914. Project Gutenberg
- Denis, Maurice. 'Definition of Neo-Traditionism.' Art and Criticism. August 1890.
- Greenberg, Clement. "Towards a Newer Laocoön." Partisan Review, 7 (July-August 1940): 296-310.
