= Christina Steinbrecher-Pfandt =

Christina Steinbrecher-Pfandt (born 1983) is an international art curator and director. She was appointed as CEO of Tech-Diplomacy.org network in March 2023. Before she was the co-founder together with Micha Anthenor Benoliel of Blockchain.art, a digital platform for artists and collectors. She was part of the founding team that rebranded Austria’s biggest contemporary art fair, viennacontemporary.

== Personal life ==
Christina Steinbrecher was born in Kazakhstan to German-Ukrainian parents, and speaks German, Russian and English, fluently. She moved to Cologne, Germany in 1990 where she attended Kaiserin-Augusta-Schule. She studied international business at Maastricht University, Netherlands. She went on to receive her Master of Science in Contemporary Art from Sotheby's Institute of Art in London, where she majored in Moscow Contemporary Arts in the 1990s. She is married to Stefan Oliver Pfandt. Together, they have two daughters.

== Career ==
In 2008, Steinbrecher-Pfandt moved to Moscow, Russia to run Volker Diehl Gallery. Later that year she helped to realize the Jeremy Deller show From One Revolution to Another, held at Palais de Tokyo. That same year, she co-curated the show Laughterlife with Maria Baibakova.

In 2009, she became artistic director of Art Moscow Art Fair, heading the fair until 2012. In that time Steinbrecher-Pfandt curated art shows and art directed projects throughout Europe and Russia including, Moscow House of Artists, Venice Biennale, Moscow Biennale, Artbat Fest, and for the Innovation Prize of the National Centre for Contemporary Arts.

Between 2012 and 2014, she and Vita Zaman were appointed artistic directors of VIENNAFAIR. Two years later the duo, together with managing director Renger van den Heuvel, helped rebrand VIENNAFAIR as viennacontemporary and moved the annual exhibition to the historic market hall Marx Halle. While fulfilling her duties at viennacontemporary she also curated the 2013 exhibition Rhythm Assignment at the Bonnefantenmuseum.

Steinbrecher-Pfandt assumed a leading role at viennacontemporary in 2016, expanding the fair’s international presence. She is credited with sharpening the fair’s profile and for positioning it as the “gateway to the East.” In 2018, Steinbrecher-Pfandt was named “40 under 40” by Apollo magazine for her role in advancing contemporary art in Vienna. Later that year, she resigned from viennacontemporary and moved to San Francisco to "help bridge the gap between art and tech" with the launch of Blockchain.art.

In 2019 she began serving in an advisory role to the festival Ars Electronica. She sits on the boards of the Armenia Art Foundation, the Ural Industrial Biennial of Contemporary Art, Artbat Fest, and CADAF Fair, as well as giving talks about art in the digital age.
