= St. Johann im Pongau =

Sankt Johann im Pongau
- Municipality
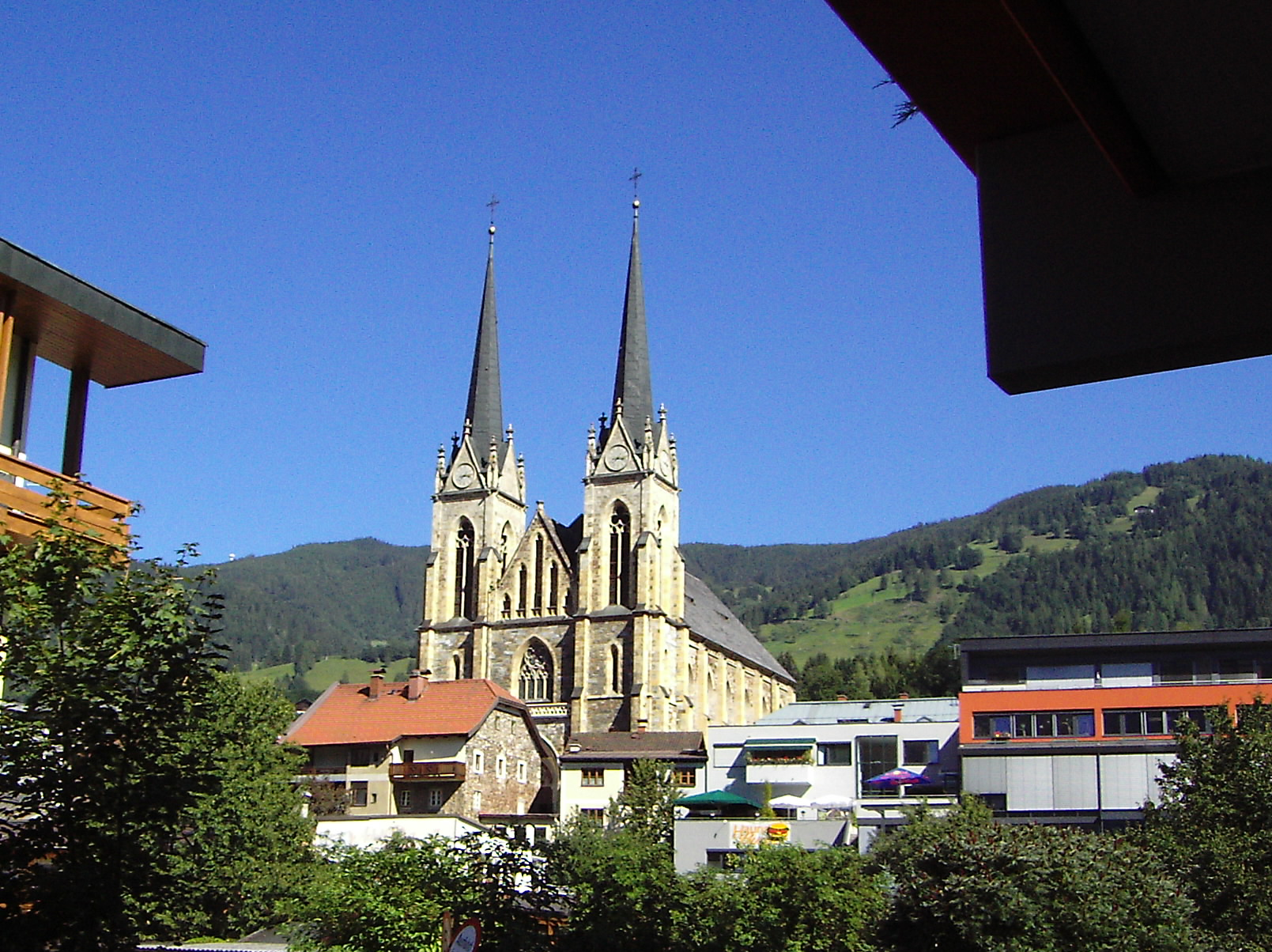
- Exterior View of the Cathedral of St. Johann

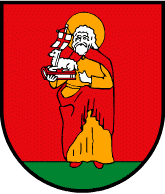
- Coat of arms

- Location within Austria
- Coordinates: 47°21′N 13°12′E
- Country: Austria
- State: Salzburg
- District: Pongau

Government
  - Mayor: Eveline Huber ( SPÖ)

Area
  - Total: 78.14 km^{2} (30.17 sq mi)
- Elevation: 565–618 m (1,854–2,028 ft)

Population (2020-01-01)
  - Total: 11,235
  - Density: 143.8/km^{2} (372.4/sq mi)
- Time zone: UTC+1 (CET)
  - Summer (DST): UTC+2 (CEST)
- Postal code: 5600
- Area code: 06412
- Vehicle registration: JO
- Website: st.johann.at

St. Johann im Pongau (Saiga Håns or Sainig Håns in the local Pongau dialect, abbreviated St.Johann/Pg.) is a city in the state of Salzburg, Austria. It is the administrative centre of the St. Johann im Pongau District.

== Geography ==
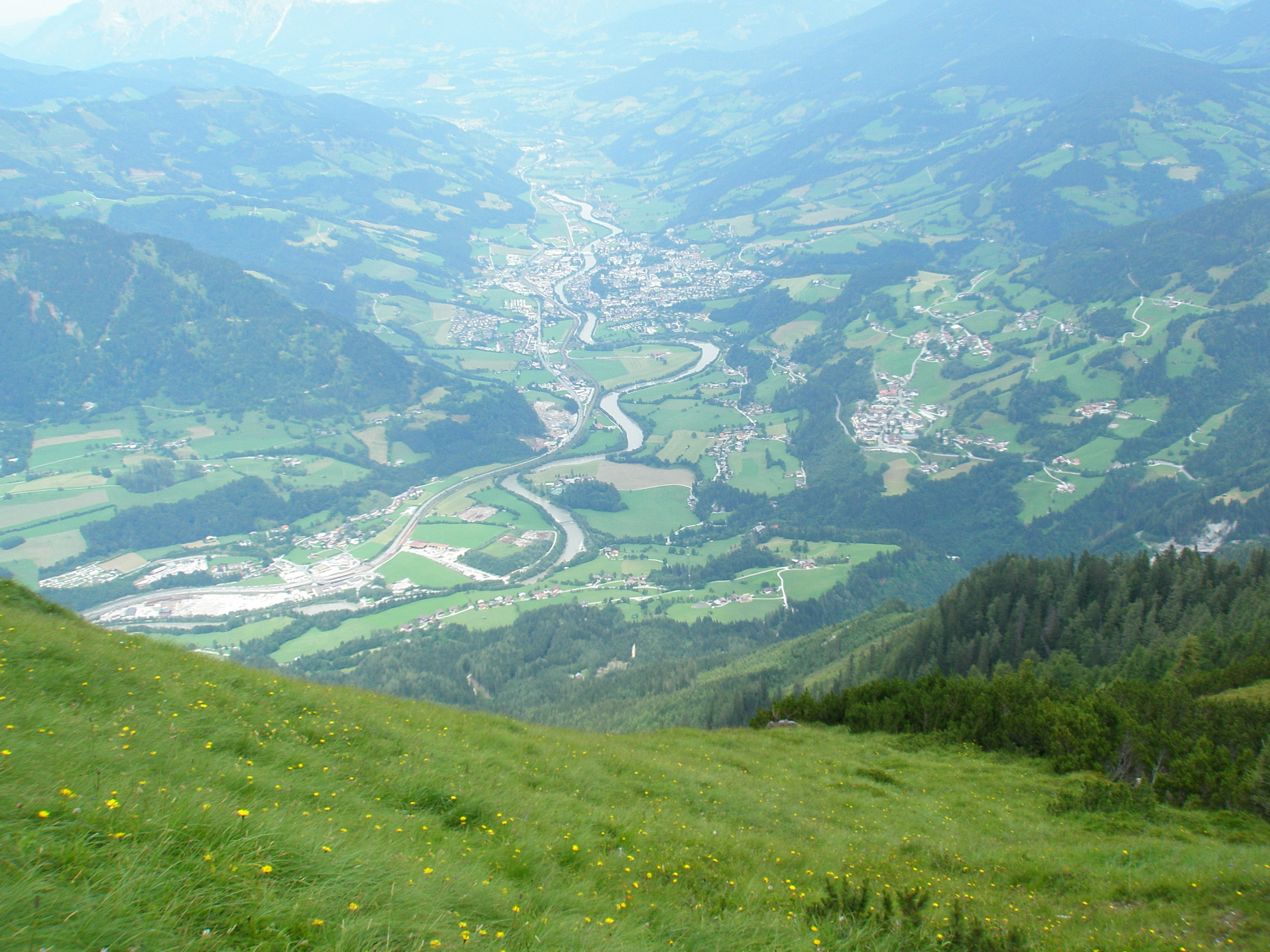
Salzach Valley

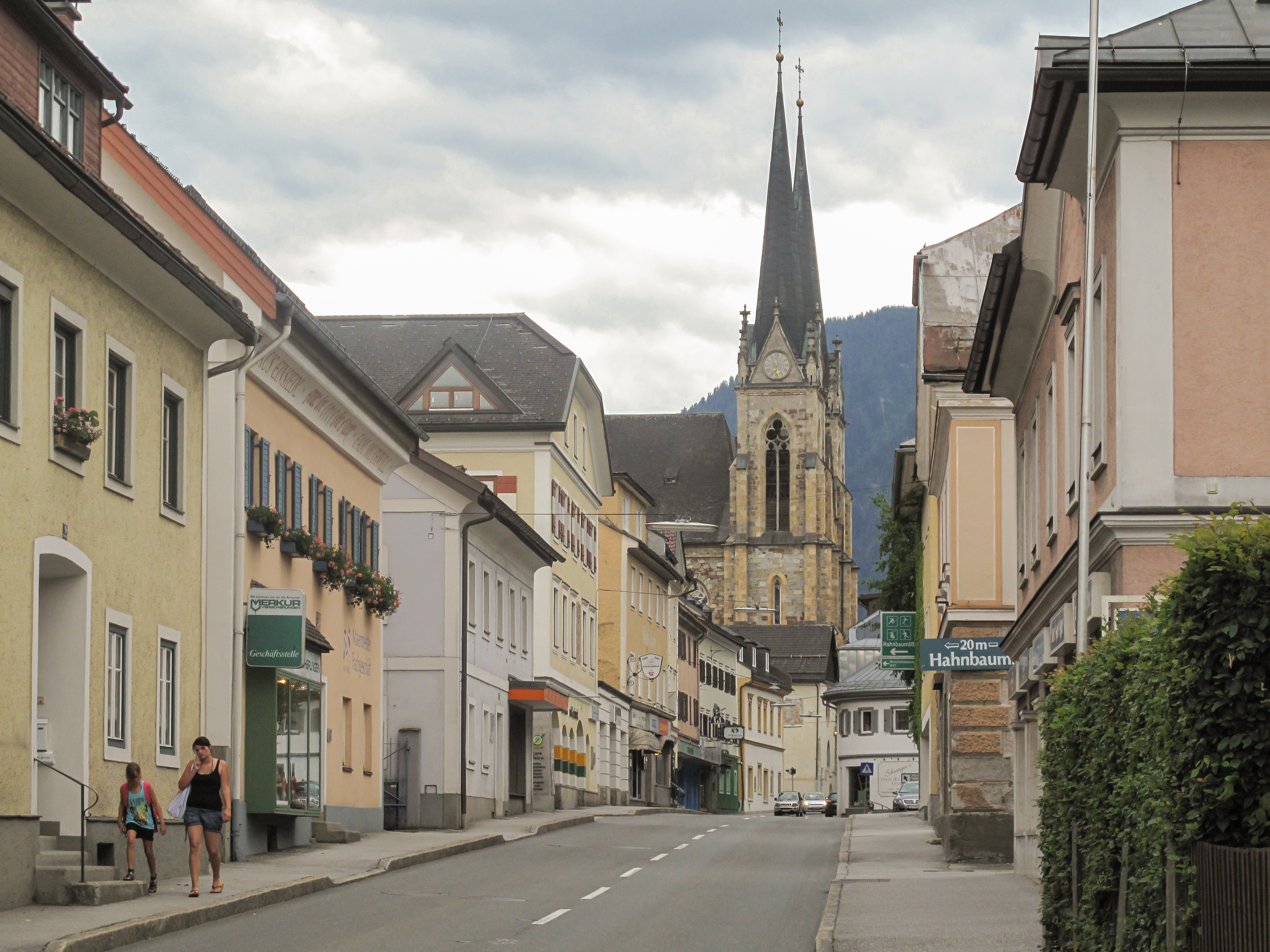
Sankt Johann, Center of the town

The city is located in the Salzach Valley of the Eastern Alps, between the Salzburg Slate Alps in the north, the Radstadt Tauern (part of the Niedere Tauern range) in the southeast, and the Ankogel Group (Hohe Tauern) in the southwest.

The city lies in the centre of the Salzburg Pongau region. The municipal area consists of cadastral communities of Ginau, Hallmoos, Maschl, Einöden, Plankenau, Reinbach, Rettenstein, St. Johann, and Urreiting.

The setting of the city allows the area to be largely dependent on tourism, Alpine skiing in winter and hiking in the summer months. A gorge called Liechtensteinklamm lies south of the city. This gorge is about 4 kilometres (2.5 mi) long and can be explored via walkways, first built by Prince Johann II of Liechtenstein in 1875.

== History ==
The Salzach Valley, an ancient copper mining area, has been settled at least since the Bronze Age. The settlement was first mentioned as Sanctum Johannem in Villa in a 1074 deed, named after John the Baptist. For centuries, it was a possession held by the Prince-Archbishops of Salzburg.

In the course of the German Peasants' War of 1525–26, large parts of the population became Protestant. Under the rule of Prince-Archbishop Count Leopold Anton von Firmian in 1731, numerous inhabitants (called Exulanten) were forced to leave the country. Many of them found refuge in the Kingdom of Prussia, choosing to settle in Gumbinnen (now Gusev).

In 1939, following the Austrian Anschluss to Nazi Germany, St. Johann was renamed Markt Pongau and from 1941 was the site of the World War II Stalag XVIII-C (317) German prisoner-of-war camp run by the Wehrmacht. Mainly French, Serbian and Red Army POWs, but also Polish, Belgian, Dutch, British, American, Hungarian and Italian POWs, were interred here. About 4,000 Soviet inmates were killed or succumbed to the conditions of their detention. A Russian Cemetery and a monument to this camp are located on the north end of the city. The camp was liberated by American troops on May 8, 1945.

On 24 June 2000, St. Johann completed the Stadtserhebung process and received official city privileges from the Austrian government.

== Sport ==
TSV St. Johann im Pongau are an association football team, who play at the Sportplatz St. Johann stadium. Around the football pitch is a motorcycle speedway track that has been used for important events, including the Austrian qualifying rounds of the Speedway World Championship (starting in 1990).

== Personalities ==
- Gerald Mild (born 1962), tennis player
- Petra Kronberger (born 1969), skier
- Iris Strubegger (born 1984), model
- Joachim Puchner (born 1987), skier
- Mirjam Puchner (born 1992), skier

== Gallery ==
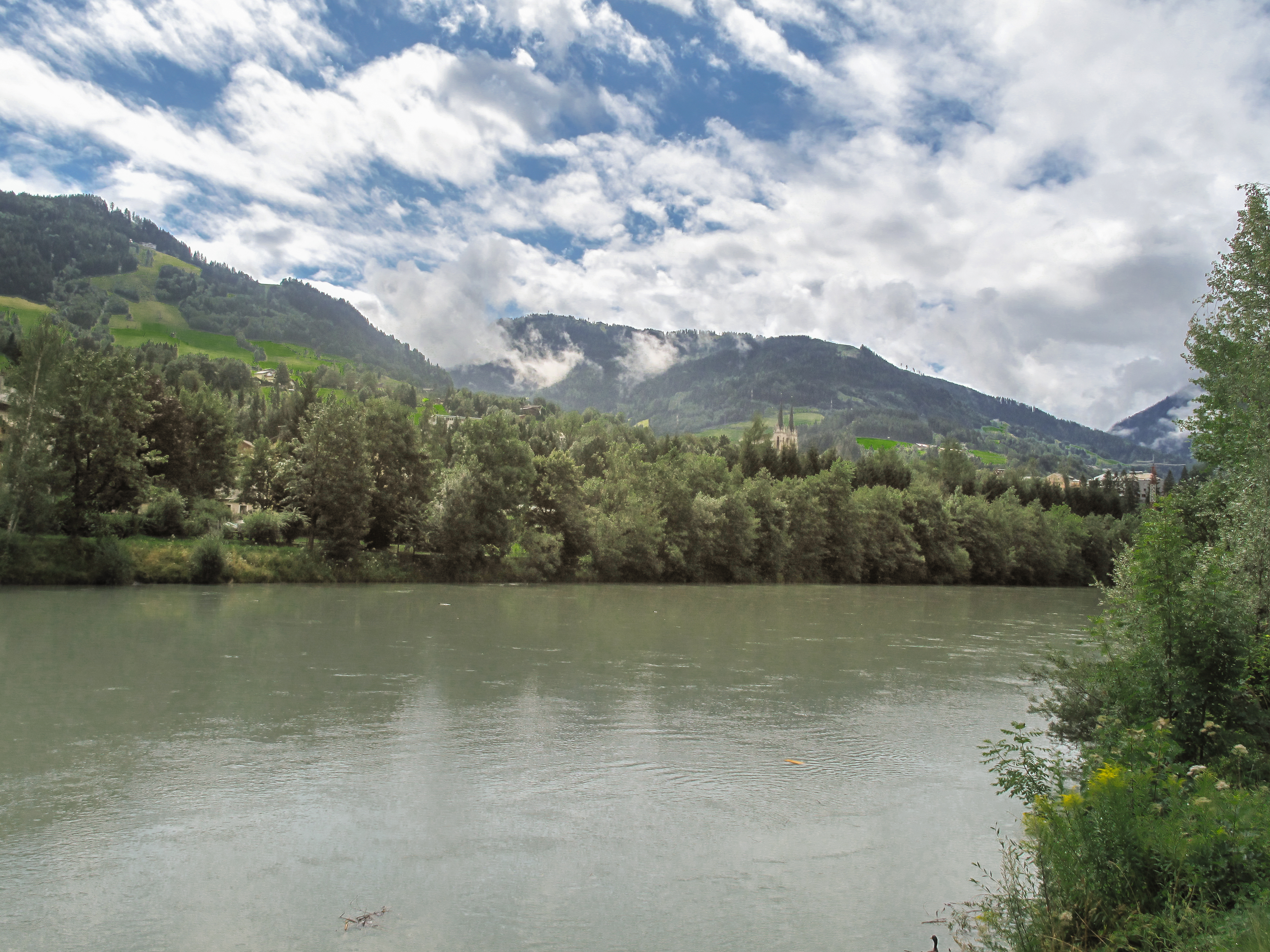
Sankt Johann im Pongau, view to the town from the station

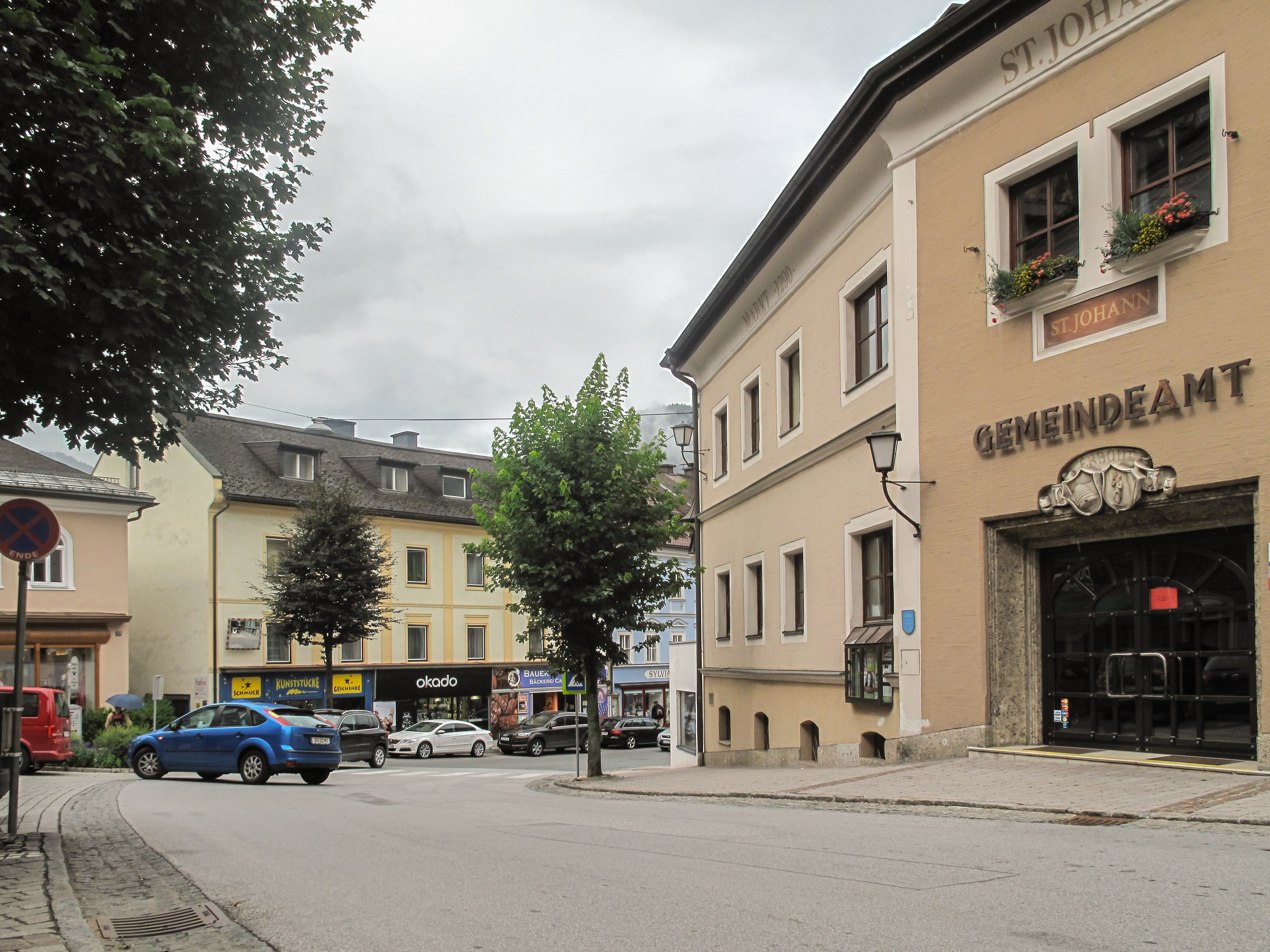
Sankt Johann im Pongau, street near the town hall
