= Zupan (surname) =

Zupan and Župan are Slovene and Croatian surnames. Notable people with these surnames include:

== People ==
=== Zupan ===
- Antonijo Zupan (born 1976), Croatian footballer
- Blaž Zupan (born 1968), Slovene computer scientist
- Branko Zupan (born 1964), Slovene footballer and manager
- Dim Zupan (born 1946), Slovene children's writer
- Ivo Zupan (born 1956), Slovene ski jumper
- Jure Zupan (born 1943), Slovene politician
- Mark Zupan, American academic
- Mark Zupan (born 1975), American wheelchair rugby player
- Marty Zupan (born 1949), American writer and libertarian
- Matjaž Zupan (born 1968), Slovene jumper
- Miha Zupan (born 1982), Slovene basketball player
- Polona Zupan (born 1976), Slovene snowboarder
- Primož Urh-Zupan (born 1983), Slovene ski jumper
- Teja Zupan (born 1990), Slovene swimmer
- Uroš Zupan (born 1963), Slovene poet
- Vitomil Zupan (1914–1987), Slovene writer
- Zdravko Zupan (1950–2015), Yugoslav comic book creator and historian

=== Župan ===
- Dragan Župan (born 1982), Croatian footballer
- Romana Župan (born 1987), Croatian sports sailor
- Valter Župan (born 1938), Croatian Roman Catholic bishop
