= Dragutin Kurćubić =

Serbian politician

Dragutin Kurćubić (Serbian Cyrillic: Драгутин Курћубић), nicknamed Draga and also known as Dragan Kurćubić, is a Serbian politician. He was the mayor of Nova Varoš from 1993 to 1996 and served in the Yugoslavian parliament's Chamber of Citizens from 1997 to 2000. For most of his time as an elected official, Kurćubić was a member of the Serbian Renewal Movement (SPO).

== Private career ==
Kurćubić is a graduated economist.

== Politician ==
=== Mayor of Nova Varoš ===
During the 1990s, Serbian politics was dominated by the Socialist Party of Serbia (SPS) under the authoritarian leadership of Slobodan Milošević. For most of the decade, the SPO was one of the country's most prominent opposition parties.

The SPO joined a multi-party coalition called the Democratic Movement of Serbia (DEPOS) in 1992. DEPOS won eleven seats out of twenty-seven in the Nova Varoš municipal assembly December 1992 Serbian local elections, while the SPS won nine, and the Democratic Party (DS) won four. DEPOS and the DS formed a coalition government after the election; Kurćubić was one of the DEPOS candidates elected and was chosen afterward as president of the assembly, a position that was then equivalent to mayor.

Once in power, the DEPOS–DS administration changed some communist-era street names and displayed a picture of Draža Mihailović in a municipal building. In a March 1994 interview, Kurćubić denied that these changes were due to revanchism and said that the administration's intention was to "bring back the names of those who were responsible for this region." He also criticized Serbia's republican government for taking responsibility over the municipality's power plant, forestry industry, and electric power industry, and called for more powers to be returned to the municipality.

The municipal government experienced significant divisions later in 1994, due in part to disagreements within its constituent parties. In December 1994, Kurćubić called a special meeting of the municipal assembly to add a member of the Federation of Associations of Veterans of the People's Liberation War (SUBNOR) to a committee marking the fiftieth anniversary of Serbia's liberation from fascism. SUBNOR was associated with the former communist administration, and the appointment generated some controversy. Kurćubić said that his purpose was to ensure the committee had broad representation, but some of his putative allies in the assembly heckled him as a "commie," also using other derogatory names. He left the SPO in the aftermath of this controversy, at which point the president of the party's local board called for his resignation as mayor. Kurćubić refused to stand down and remained in office during this time. His departure from the SPO proved to be temporary; he rejoined the party in 1995 and became the president of its board for the Zlatibor District.

The Socialist Party subsequently achieved a working majority in the municipal assembly, and on 22 April 1996 Kurćubić was dismissed as mayor at the SPS's initiative.

=== Yugoslavian parliamentarian ===
The SPO joined an alliance called Zajedno (Together) in 1996, and Kurćubić appeared in the lead position on the alliance's electoral list for the Užice division in the 1996 Yugoslavian parliamentary election. Zajedno won one seat in the division. Under normal circumstances, Kurćubić would have been awarded a mandate in the federal assembly's Chamber of Citizens soon after of the election. In the event, however, the distribution of the Zajedno seats became a source of controversy over the following year.

Zajedno won twenty-two seats in total, but the alliance's constituent parties could not agree on the distribution of its mandates, leading to an extended standoff. According to a pre-election agreement, the SPO was supposed to receive forty-five per cent of the alliance's seats in the federal assembly, while the other parties were to share the remaining fifty-five per cent. Under Yugoslavia's electoral laws at the time, however, one-third of the mandates in each electoral division were to be assigned to candidates on successful lists in numerical order, while the remaining two-thirds were to be assigned at the discretion of the sponsoring parties or coalitions. Due to rounding, the lead candidates on all lists that won assembly representation were automatically elected. There were several divisions where Zajedno won only a single seat, and the overall distribution of these mandates strongly favoured the SPO. Six candidates elected from the SPO would have needed to resign to fulfill the pre-election agreement, a solution that the party did not accept.

By late 1997, the Zajedno alliance had broken up at the republic level. Yugoslavia's federal election commission ultimately approved eighteen of the twenty-two Zajedno mandates on 30 December 1997, and the Chamber of Citizens formally ratified the mandates the following day. Twelve of these eighteen mandates were assigned to SPO candidates, Kurćubić among them. Online accounts do not clarify how much of a role he played in the assembly, though he was not a candidate in the 2000 Yugoslavian parliamentary election. The Socialist Party's alliance and its Montenegrin allies won the 1996 election, and the SPO members served in opposition, except when the party took part in a coalition government from January to April 1999.

=== After 2000 ===
Serbia's local election laws were reformed prior to the 2004 local elections, such that mayors were directly elected. Kurćubić ran in Nova Varoš as an independent candidate and was defeated in the first round of voting.

He was appointed to the municipal council of Nova Varoš (i.e., the executive branch of the municipal government) in July 2012 and served for the four-year term that followed. Available online sources do not clarify if he was a member of a political party at this time.

== Electoral record ==
2004 Municipality of Nova Varoš local election: Mayor of Nova Varoš
Candidate	Party	First round		Second round	
Candidate	Party	Votes	%	Votes	%
Branislav Dilparić	Socialist Party of Serbia	2,642	28.68	4,277	57.91
Milojko Šunjevarić (incumbent)	Democratic Party–Boris Tadić	1,478	16.05	3,108	42.09
all other candidates (combined total)		5,091	55.27		
Radivoje Bujišić Raco	Citizens' Group: New People for Nova Varoš				
Milenko Drobnjaković	New Serbia–Velimir Ilić				
Milan Knežević	Serbian Radical Party–Tomislav Nikolić				
Zoran Knežević	Citizens' Group: Movement for Nova Varoš				
Snežana Krdžavac Nedović	Strength of Serbia Movement				
Dragutin Kurćubić Dragan	Citizens' Group				
Dr. Branko Popović	Serbian Renewal Movement				
Zoran Tatović	Democratic Citizens' Group Nova Varoš				
Nenad Todorović	G17 Plus				
Zoran Vasojević	Citizens' Group: Nova Varoš Renewal Movement				
Miladin Zeković	Democratic Party of Serbia–Vojislav Koštunica				
Total		9,211	100.00	7,385	100.00
Source: All candidates except Dilparić and Šunjevarić are listed alphabetically.
