= Slovenia national under-21 football team =

National youth association football team

Slovenia Under-21
- Association: Football Association of Slovenia
- Confederation: UEFA (Europe)
- Head coach: Andrej Razdrh
- FIFA code: SVN
First colours	Second colours

First international
- Cyprus 1–0 Slovenia (Paralimni, Cyprus; 17 November 1992)

Biggest win
- Estonia 1–7 Slovenia (Rakvere, Estonia; 8 September 2014)

Biggest defeat
- Slovenia 0–6 Slovakia (Sežana, Slovenia; 11 February 2003)

UEFA U-21 Championship
- Appearances: 2 (first in 2021)
- Best result: Group stage (2021, 2025)

The Slovenia national under-21 football team is the national under-21 football team of Slovenia, under the control of the Football Association of Slovenia. This team is intended for Slovenian players who are 21 years of age or younger at the start of the calendar year in which the biennial UEFA European Under-21 Championship campaign begins, so some players may remain in the team until they are 23.

The under-21 national team was formed in 1992, a year after Slovenia gained independence from Yugoslavia. Their first competitive campaign was the 1996 UEFA European Under-21 Championship qualifiers, where Slovenia failed to qualify after finishing third in their qualifying group, two points behind group winners Italy. Slovenia made its first appearance at the European Under-21 Championship in 2021, automatically qualifying as co-hosts.

== Manager history ==
Dates	Name
1993–1994	(Slovenia) Zdenko Verdenik
1994–1997	(Slovenia) Drago Kostanjšek
2004	(Slovenia) Branko Oblak
2004–2007	(Slovenia) Branko Zupan
2008–2014	(Slovenia) Tomaž Kavčič
2014	(Slovenia) Robert Englaro
2015–2020	(Slovenia) Primož Gliha
2020–2025	(Slovenia) Milenko Ačimovič
2025–present	(Slovenia) Andrej Razdrh

== Competitive record ==
=== UEFA European Under-21 Championship record ===
UEFA European Under-21 Championship								Qualification					
Year	Round	Pld	W	D	L	F	A	Pld	W	D	L	F	A
(France) 1994	Did not enter							Did not enter					
(Spain) 1996	Did not qualify							10	6	1	3	19	12
(Romania) 1998	Did not qualify							8	3	0	5	9	13
(Slovakia) 2000	Did not qualify							10	1	5	4	10	19
(Switzerland) 2002	Did not qualify							8	2	2	4	10	10
(Germany) 2004	Did not qualify							8	2	3	3	4	7
(Portugal) 2006	Did not qualify							12	4	4	4	13	15
(Netherlands) 2007	Did not qualify							2	1	0	1	1	2
(Sweden) 2009	Did not qualify							8	1	2	5	4	13
(Denmark) 2011	Did not qualify							8	2	2	4	6	10
(Israel) 2013	Did not qualify							10	6	2	2	15	8
(Czech Republic) 2015	Did not qualify							10	5	2	3	29	11
(Poland) 2017	Did not qualify							10	5	0	5	18	11
(Italy) (San Marino) 2019	Did not qualify							10	4	4	2	14	12
(Hungary) (Slovenia) 2021	Group stage	3	0	1	2	1	8	Qualified as host					
(Romania) (Georgia (country)) 2023	Did not qualify							10	4	4	2	11	7
(Slovakia) 2025	Group stage	3	0	1	2	0	5	8	5	2	1	13	7
(Albania) (Serbia) 2027	Did not qualify							8	1	2	5	7	17
Total	Group stage	6	0	2	4	1	13	140	52	35	53	183	174
