= Branko Ojdanić =

Bosnian footballer (born 1990)

Personal information
- Full name: Branko Ojdanić
- Date of birth: 21 June 1990 (age 36)
- Place of birth: Banja Luka, SFR Yugoslavia
- Height: 1.90 m (6 ft 3 in)
- Position: Centre-back

Team information
- Current team: TSV St. Johann
- Number: 14

Youth career
- –2008: Župa Milosavci
- 2009: Borac Banja Luka

Senior career*
Years	Team	Apps	(Gls)
2009–2011	Laktaši	3	(0)
2011–2012	Iskra Bugojno		
2012	Laktaši		
2012–2013	Slavija Sarajevo	3	(0)
2013–2015	Kozara Gradiška	1	(0)
2015	Pécsi	9	(1)
2015–2016	Istra 1961	16	(0)
2016–2017	Brežice 1919	8	(1)
2017–2018	Borac Banja Luka	31	(2)
2018–2019	OFK Titograd	20	(0)
2019–2020	Bregenz	16	(3)
2020–2021	Olimpik	16	(0)
2021–2024	SK Bischofshofen	74	(4)
2024–	TSV St. Johann	52	(7)
- * Club domestic league appearances and goals as of 27 June 2026

Branko Ojdanić (Serbian Cyrillic: Бранко Ојданић; born 21 June 1990) is a Bosnian professional footballer who plays as a centre-back for Austrian club TSV St. Johann.

== Honours ==
Borac Banja Luka

- First League of RS: 2016–17
