= Liechtensteinklamm =

Ravine of Großarler Ache in Salzburg

Coordinates: 47.3108°N 13.1908°E

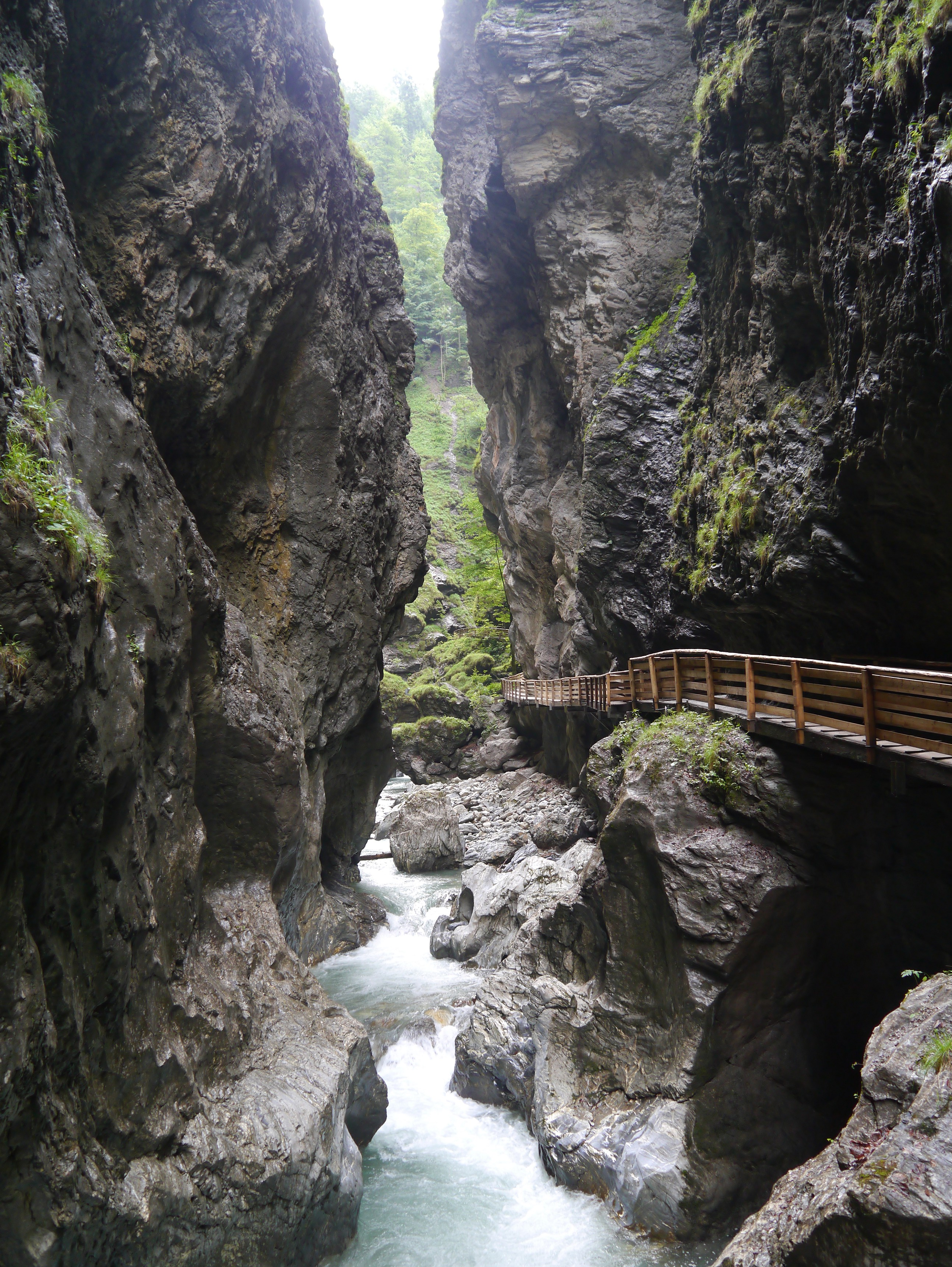
Liechtenstein Gorge

Liechtensteinklamm (Liechtenstein Gorge) is a gorge with walls up to 300m high, located near St Johann im Pongau in the Austrian Alps, 50 km south of Salzburg. It is around 4 km long and is named after Johann II of Liechtenstein who had the walkways installed in 1875.

The gorge is around 4 km in length of which 1 km is accessible during summer months by means of wooden walkways. It has a depth of up to 300m and in some places is only a few meters wide. At the end of the gorge is a waterfall. It receives around 100,000 visitors a year.

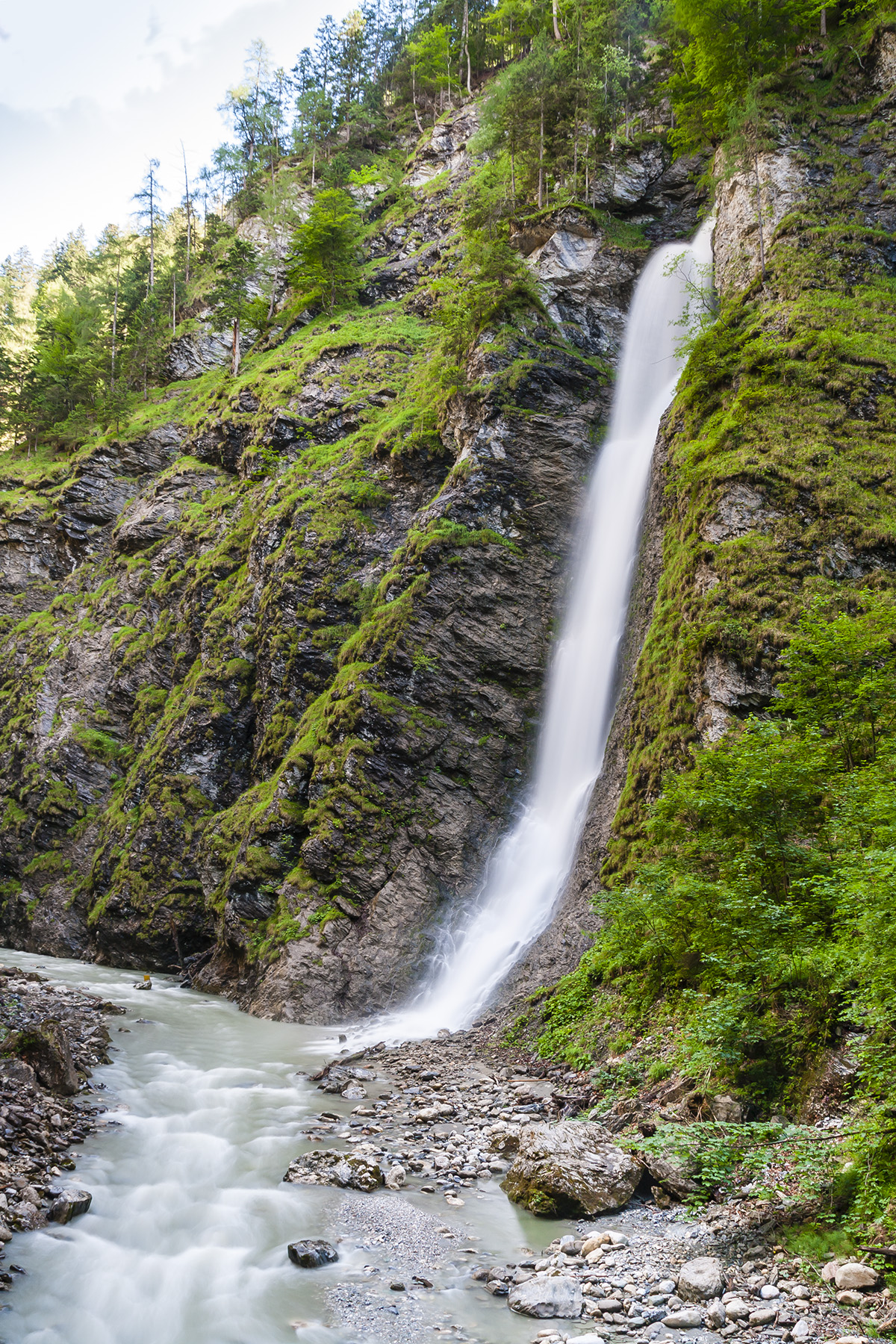
Waterfall in the Gorge

The waters of the Großarler Ache, a mountain stream, formed the gorge over thousands of years. In 1875 work began by members of the Pongau Alpine Club to make the gorge accessible, but was not completed due to a lack of funds. Prince Johann II of Liechtenstein, who ran a hunting lodge in the nearby Großarl, donated 600 guilders for an expansion of the work. At the completion of work in 1876 the gorge was renamed to honour the donation from the Prince.
