= Branko Popović (politician) =

Serbian politician

Branko Popović (Serbian Cyrillic: Бранко Поповић; born 1975) is a medical doctor and politician in Serbia. He served in the National Assembly of Serbia from 2017 to 2020 and is now the president (i.e., speaker) of the Nova Varoš municipal assembly. Popović is a member of the Serbian Progressive Party (Srpska napredna stranka, SNS).

== Early life and career ==
Popović was born in Nova Varoš, in what was then the Socialist Republic of Serbia in the Socialist Federal Republic of Yugoslavia. Educated in Belgrade, he later returned to his home community to practice medicine as a pneumophtisiologist. He has been the director of the Health Center in Nova Varoš.

== Politician ==
=== Parliamentarian ===
Popović was a member of the Serbian Renewal Movement (Srpski pokret obnove, SPO) in the early 2000s. He appeared in the 207th position (out of 248) on the combined electoral list of the SPO and New Serbia in the 2003 Serbian parliamentary election and was not included in his party's delegation when the list won twenty-two mandates. (From 2000 to 2011, parliamentary mandates were awarded to successful parties or coalitions rather than to individual candidates, and it was common practice for the mandates to be assigned out of numerical order. Popović could have been awarded a mandate despite his low position on the list, but he was not.) He also appeared on the SPO's list in the 2007 election, in which the party did not cross the electoral threshold to win representation in the assembly. He joined the Progressive Party in 2010.

Serbia's electoral system was reformed in 2011, such that parliamentary mandates were awarded in numerical order to candidates on successful lists. Popović received the 142nd position on the Progressive Party's Aleksandar Vučić – Serbia Is Winning list in the 2016 Serbian parliamentary election. The list won a majority victory with 131 out of 250 mandates; Popović was not immediately elected but was able to take a seat on 12 October 2017 as a replacement for Branislav Blažić, who had resigned to take a government position. During his time in parliament, Popović was a deputy member of the environmental protection committee and the health and family committee.

He received the 232nd position on the Progressive Party's Aleksandar Vučić — For Our Children list in the 2020 parliamentary election. This was too low a position for re-election to be a realistic possibility, and he was not re-elected even as the list won a landslide majority with 188 mandates.

=== Municipal politics ===
Popović ran as the SPO's mayoral candidate in the 2004 Serbian local elections and was defeated. The direct election of mayors was discontinued after this election cycle.

Popović served a number of terms in the Nova Varoš municipal assembly before receiving a mandate for the national assembly in 2017. In February 2016, he was appointed to a provisional administration that governed the municipality pending new elections, following the resignation of the incumbent mayor. He received the second position on the Progressive Party's list in the 2016 Serbian local elections and was re-elected when the list won a plurality victory with twelve out of twenty-seven mandates.

Popović was included in the fourth position on the Progressive list for Nova Varoš in the 2020 local elections and was elected for another term when the list won a majority victory with sixteen mandates. When the assembly convened in August 2020, he was chosen as its president.

== Electoral record ==
2004 Municipality of Nova Varoš local election: Mayor of Nova Varoš
Candidate	Party	First round		Second round	
Candidate	Party	Votes	%	Votes	%
Branislav Dilparić	Socialist Party of Serbia	2,642	28.68	4,277	57.91
Milojko Šunjevarić (incumbent)	Democratic Party–Boris Tadić	1,478	16.05	3,108	42.09
all other candidates (combined total)		5,091	55.27		
Radivoje Bujišić Raco	Citizens' Group: New People for Nova Varoš				
Milenko Drobnjaković	New Serbia–Velimir Ilić				
Milan Knežević	Serbian Radical Party–Tomislav Nikolić				
Zoran Knežević	Citizens' Group: Movement for Nova Varoš				
Snežana Krdžavac Nedović	Strength of Serbia Movement				
Dragutin Kurćubić Dragan	Citizens' Group				
Branko Popović	Serbian Renewal Movement				
Zoran Tatović	Democratic Citizens' Group Nova Varoš				
Nenad Todorović	G17 Plus				
Zoran Vasojević	Citizens' Group: Nova Varoš Renewal Movement				
Miladin Zeković	Democratic Party of Serbia–Vojislav Koštunica				
Total		9,211	100.00	7,385	100.00
Source: All candidates except Dilparić and Šunjevarić are listed alphabetically.
