= VIENNAFAIR =

VIENNAFAIR is Austria's biggest fair for contemporary art and focuses on the CEE (later this concept was expanded to Central, Eastern and South-Eastern Europe) region. It has taken place in Vienna every year since 2005 until 2015. Since 2015, the fair has been held under a new name – viennacontemporary.

== History ==
In 2005 the viennAfair (older spelling) was founded by Reed Messe Wien GmbH. Its artistic management was taken over by Gabriela Gantenbein with a mainly Austrian team and board. The original reasons for founding the fair included providing more sales opportunities for the art galleries, which are found in large numbers in Vienna, and establishing Vienna as a location for art. From the beginning, the supporting programme included public discussions and curated exhibitions.

Because of Vienna's geopolitical situation, a relation was established to the countries of Central, Eastern and South-Eastern Europe. At first mainly the countries newly acceding to the EU were exhibited and supported. An eligibility committee – originally consisting of mainly Austrian art dealers but over the years becoming more and more international – was responsible for selecting the galleries.

=== 2006-2010 ===
Under the artistic directorship of Edek Bartz the supporting programme was further developed from 2006 to 2010. “By 2010 ‘VIENNAFAIR' had achieved international recognition as a small but specialised art fair, where it was possible, in particular, to make discoveries from Eastern European.” (see: Press release January 2012, p. 2) In addition to discussions, in 2006 video presentations and guides, as well as tours through areas outside the fair, such as museums, were on offer. In 2008 Edek Bartz increased the international focus with new galleries, programmes and collectors with a focus on CEE countries, and international fair board and an eligibility committee. The exhibition project “curated by”, initiated by the creative agency “departure”, supported the fair's supporting programme by having even the gallery spaces used for such programmes as artist interviews, guided tours and discussions. By 2010 the supporting programme had been further expanded in several directions: directors of museums and institutions were invited to take part in discussions with artists like Pawel Althamer, Julien Bismuth, and Shirin Neshat. A “Performance Nite” was instituted by artists especially focused on the VIENNAFAIR. In addition, Edek Bartz curated a special exhibition where private collectors and museums showed their favourite videos. The intention of the exhibition was not only to define a uniform thematic framework but also to show a very personal, subjective view of each individual collector.

=== 2011 ===
In 2011 the artistic direction was taken over by Hedwig Saxenhuber and Georg Schöllhammer, who had already held responsibility as editors, curators and critics and are experts on Eastern and South-Eastern European art. In 2011 it was possible to record the largest participation to date from the CEE focus countries. The new artistic directors designed the special programme “DIYALOG: Art from Istanbul”, thus creating a new focus on contemporary Turkish art. They extended the radius of galleries further in the direction of the Caucasus, Central Asia and the Middle East, and special programmes on these regions were shown in specialist non-commercial sections. With the “Vienna School of Collecting Theory” – a meeting place for artists, collectors, curators and laypeople – new groups of collectors were to be created. Hedwig Saxenhuber and Georg Schöllhammer provided a special area at the fair for the support programme with its innovative content. A new architectural concept was created by Johannes Porsch, with reference to the plan of a caravansary. The graphic design work for VIENNAFAIR 2011 was by Gerwald Rockenschaub.

=== 2012 ===
In April 2012 Sergey Skaterschikov, a professional art & luxury industry investor, had acquired Viennafair from Reed Exhibitions and presented a new team of artistic directors: Christina Steinbrecher and Vita Zaman. Christina Steinbrecher had already worked, for example, as director and curator for projects like Art Moscow, the Sputnik Art Foundation and the Innovation Prize of the National Centre for Contemporary Art. Vita Zaman studied art, art history, photography and Creative Curating in London. She is one of the founders of IBID Projects in London and worked for The Pace Gallery in New York. The focus on the Central and Eastern European region was extended under the new artistic directors, in particular towards Russia. Reed Exhibition withdrew from the project, and since 2012 VIENNAFAIR has been organised by the VF Betriebsgesellschaft mbH. The special programme “DIYALOG” has been retained and further expanded. A large number of supporting programmes and exhibitions were implemented during the days of the fair. The various talks and public discussions have been continued, but new programmes have also been created: VIENNA Quintet brought contemporary art from five former Soviet countries – Azerbaijan, Belarus, Georgia, Kazakhstan and Ukraine – to Vienna. For the first time, by VIENNA Sonic, a crossover programme between music and art was presented. Under the name VIENNA Live performances were realised and VIENNA Studio employed students in their own special programme.

From its beginnings, VIENNAFAIR has become an important component in the Vienna art world, and both as a platform and as a meeting place it has made a major contribution to the Austrian art scene.

=== 2013 ===
For its 9th edition in 2013, VIENNAFAIR The New Contemporary, increased its attendance with over 25% registering 23.963 visitors showcasing 127 galleries from 27 countries and a wide range of special projects offering an in depth view of the contemporary art scene from Central, Eastern and South-Eastern Europe with for example VIENNA Duet showing positions from Poland and Georgia, VIENNA XL offering a platform to 6 non-for-profit and artist run spaces from CEE region and an elaborate VIENNA Talks program. Under artistic leadership of Steinbrecher-Pfandt and Zaman the event has grown significantly internationally not only expanding ist reach towards the East – mainly Russia and CIS – but also towards the West. VIENNAFAIR also reached out locally by further developing art educational programs for young collectors, families, students and seniors. With VIENNAFAIR turnaround completed in 2013 and VIENNAFAIR returning firmly into collectors' calendar by that time, Mr. Skaterschikov made a decision to exit his investment in VIENNAFAIR and sold all of his ownership interest in it to Mr. Dmitry Aksenov, a Russian real estate investor that Mr. Skaterschikov had originally brought in to co-invest in VIENNAFAIR in 2012.

=== 2014 ===
Between 2 and 5 October 2014, a second consecutive attendance record was set which saw VIENNAFAIR break the 25.000 mark. With a deliberate downsizing in order to improve the overall quality, the 10th edition of VIENNAFAIR hosted 99 galleries and 16 institutions from 25 countries. With special presentations such as DIALOG: NEW ENERGIES and VIENNA Focus the art scenes of, respectively, Romania and Azerbaijan were put in the spotlight and young Austrian artists once more had the opportunity to shine with solo presentations in ZONE1. A well balanced talks program with international speakers such as Kasper König, Adam Budak, Viktor Missiano, Andreiana Mihail and Aida Muhmudova, to name but a few, offered in-depth insights and understanding of today's contemporary art scene. Special attention was also given to collecting and collectors with the second edition of the Young Collectors Talk and the third collectors forum “20 four 7: Collecting The New Contemporary”.

A major step forward was made in bringing a larger international audience to VIENNAFAIR. Groups of international top collectors from Germany, Russia, Belgium, The Netherlands, France, Italy, UK and US flocked to Vienna for the fair also attending the many fringe events at the fair and in the city of Vienna. The service oriented approach towards the collectors, top-flight guests and partners, a higher quality in galleries and art presented resulted in an increase of sales with more than 25%, confirming VIENNAFAIR's successful positioning in the international fair calendar.

Now under sole artistic leadership of Christina Steinbrecher-Pfandt, VIENNAFAIR The New Contemporary focused on quality, service and art education attracting the international art community as well as the local art lovers to Austria's contemporary art capital.

After three years (2012 – 2014) under the management of VF Betriebsgesellschaft mbH and its managing director Renger van den Heuvel, VIENNAFAIR The New Contemporary, has become an important meeting place between East and West not only for art and culture but also as a platform for dialogue between businesses and administrations setting up new opportunities for future co-operations in the region and beyond.

After the 2014 edition, Christina Steinbrecher-Pfandt and Renger van den Heuvel left Viennafair and started viennacontemporary, an international fair for contemporary art, with the same team that organized Viennafair from 2012-2014.

In 2015, Viennafair took place for the last time, organized by Wolfgang Pelz.
