= Branko Mataja =

Yugoslav-American guitarist (1923–2000)

Background information
- Born: November 25, 1923; Bakar, Kingdom of Yugoslavia (now Croatia)
- Died: September 9, 2000 (aged 76) Los Angeles, California, U.S.
- Genres: traditional music; Yugoslav folk music; blues
- Occupations: musician; guitarist
- Instrument: guitar
- Works: Traditional And Folk Songs Of Yugoslavia; Over Fields And Mountains

Branko Mataja (25 November 1923 – 9 September 2000) was a Yugoslav–American folk and blues musician.

== Early life ==
Clipping from a newspaper with an advertisement for Traditional Folk Songs Of Yugoslavia

Mataja was born in 1923 in Bakar (Note: Often wrongly cited in sources a "Bekar."), then part of the Kingdom of Yugoslavia. His mother, from Marceline, Missouri, married Anton Mataja, a carpenter originally from Bakar whose last name is a traditional Croatian name from Gorski Kotar. They emigrated shortly after the wedding. Not long after Mataja was born the family moved to Belgrade. Mataja started to show an early interest in music and assembled his first guitar at the age of ten.

=== Nazi detention ===
During the Axis invasion of Yugoslavia in 1941, Mataja, still a teenager, was arrested by German troops after he was unable to provide personal documentation and was sent to a labour camp in Germany. In the camp, he tried to evade forced labor by self-harming, but soon decided against it after being warned that the Germans could quickly notice that he was lying and immediately kill him. After American troops liberated the camp, Mataja spent a year at an American base, where he worked as a cook, barber and peddler of various goods such as nylon, cigarettes and chocolate. During this time Mataja befriended numerous American soldiers and started playing guitar in smaller clubs that they frequented.

== Personal life and career ==
After the war, seeing that the American quota for Yugoslav refugees was full and reluctant to return to the newly formed Yugoslavia, Mataja found refuge in England, initially living in a refugee camp in Yorkshire. There he met and married Montenegrin Roksanda Radonjić. Their son, Bata, was born in 1949. In the early 1950s, Mataja and his wife received British citizenship and moved to London, where they lived in small and cramped apartments. In 1954 they moved to Canada, in 1963 to Detroit and finally to Los Angeles in 1964. Mataja was determined to pursue a career in designing and assembling guitars. He repaired guitars and other musical equipment at local shops in Glendale such as Dick Charles Music and Grayson's Tune Town. He assembled custom guitars for various musicians, including Johnny Cash and Geddy Lee.

A self-taught electrical engineer, Mataja opened his own shop in his garage at 5811 Satsuma Avenue, where he is believed to have recorded his album Traditional And Folk Songs Of Yugoslavia (1974) and other songs a decade later which were compiled in Over Fields And Mountains in 2022. He made several custom guitars over the years, but two are believed to have been the source of the music he recorded.

== Death ==
Throughout the 1990s Mataja's deteriorating health forced him to give up playing the guitar and, in a state of depression, he died of a heart attack in 2000.

== Discovery and posthumous fame ==
In 2005 American musician David Jerković came across a copy of Mataja's album Traditional And Folk Songs Of Yugoslavia, originally released by record label Essar Records, in a used record store in Hollywood. Jerković and Doug Mcgowan, an employee at Numero Group, an American record label specializing in reissues, tracked down Bata Mataja and expressed their enthusiasm for his late father's music. Bata, however, refused Mcgowan's offer to license Branko's recordings. He changed his mind 13 years later, after retiring, and Jerković, who runs a recording studio in Los Angeles, rescued the now damaged tapes. Jerković remastered Traditional And Folk Songs Of Yugoslavia in his studio in 2021. In 2022, Numero Group released the album alongside a collection of Mataja's other songs Over Fields And Mountains. Nearly half a century later Mataja's music has attracted the attention of music critics, publishers and news outlets, including The Guardian, as well as a wider, previously unreached audience.

== Style ==
Mataja's music is described as a combination of different genres, mostly drawing inspiration from blues and Arabic music. The tunes have been described as abstract and psychedelic, with a sound more reminiscent of a mandolin than a guitar. The addition of reverb and a subtle tremolo contribute to the melancholic, "haunted" atmosphere of the music. The songs themselves are instrumental arrangements of traditional Serbian and other Yugoslav songs that exude longing and nostalgia for one's homeland. Mataja's signature sound has been often compared to that of Ennio Morricone, Dick Dale and Omar Khorshid.
