= Branko Ranković =

Serbian politician

Branko Ranković (Serbian Cyrillic: Бранко Ранковић; born 26 July 1971) is a Serbian politician. He served in the Serbian national assembly from 2004 to 2007 as a member of the far-right Serbian Radical Party (SRS). Ranković is now a member of the Serbian Progressive Party (SNS) and serves in the Koceljeva municipal assembly.

== Early life and career ==
Ranković was raised in the village of Mali Bošnjak in the Koceljeva municipality, where he graduated from secondary mechanical school. After completing military service, he worked on his family's farm.

== Politician ==
=== Serbian Radical Party ===
Ranković joined the Serbian Radical Party in 1997 and, in the same year, became the president of the Mali Bošnjak community council. In the 2000 Serbian local elections, he ran as the SRS candidate in Koceljeva's twenty-second district. Online accounts do not indicate if he was successful; there was only one SRS candidate elected to the municipal assembly in this cycle. (This was the last local electoral cycle in which candidates were elected for single-member constituency seats; subsequent local assembly elections have been held under proportional representation.)

The 2000 local elections took place concurrently with the 2000 Yugoslavian presidential election, in which longtime Serbian leader Slobodan Milošević fell from power after being defeated by Vojislav Koštunica. This was a watershed moment in Serbian politics, resulting in the end of the Socialist Party of Serbia (SPS)'s dominance after a decade in power. The Serbian government fell after Milošević's defeat in the Yugoslavian election, and a new Serbian parliamentary election was called for December 2000. Prior to the vote, Serbia's electoral laws were reformed so that the entire country became a single electoral division and all mandates were assigned to candidates on successful electoral lists at the discretion of the sponsoring parties or coalitions, irrespective of numerical order. Ranković appeared in the 149th position on the Radical Party's list and was not assigned a mandate when the list won twenty-three seats out of 250.

==== Parliamentarian ====
Ranković received the sixty-eighth position on the Radical Party's list in the 2003 Serbian parliamentary election and was given an assembly mandate when the list won eighty-two seats. Although the Radicals won more seats than any other party, they fell well short of a majority and ultimately served in opposition. During his assembly term, Ranković was a member of the industry committee.

Serbia introduced the direct election of mayors for the 2004 Serbian local elections. Ranković ran as the Radical Party's candidate in Koceljeva and was defeated in the first round of voting. He also appeared in the lead position on the party's list for the Koceljeva municipal assembly and was elected when the SRS won six seats.

He did not appear on the Radical Party's list in the 2007 Serbian parliamentary election, and his parliamentary term ended in that year. He received the 217th position on the party's list for the 2008 parliamentary election and did not receive a new mandate when the list won seventy-eight seats.

For the 2008 Serbian local elections in Koceljeva, Ranković received the twenty-eighth position on the SRS list (which was mostly alphabetical). The Radicals again won six seats in the municipality. It is unclear if he was assigned a mandate; he does not appear in a list of delegates from 2011.

=== Serbian Progressive Party ===
The Serbian Radical Party experienced a serious split in late 2008, and several of its members joined the moderate Serbian Progressive Party under the leadership of Tomislav Nikolić and Aleksandar Vučić. It is unclear from available records if Ranković joined the Progressives in 2008 or at a later time. In any event, he appeared on the twenty-second position on the SNS's list for Koceljeva in the 2020 Serbian local elections and was re-elected to the municipal assembly when the list won a landslide victory with twenty-eight out of thirty-one seats. (By this time, Serbia's electoral laws had been reformed such that all assembly mandates were given to candidates on successful lists in numerical order).

Ranković appeared in the nineteenth position on the SNS's list for Koceljeva in the 2023 Serbian local elections and was re-elected when the list won twenty-two seats. When the assembly convened in February 2024, he was appointed to the municipal assembly's mandate-immunity committee.

== Electoral record ==
=== Local (Koceljeva) ===
2004 Municipality of Koceljeva local election: Mayor of Koceljeva
Candidate	Party	First round		Second round	
Candidate	Party	Votes	%	Votes	%
Veroljub Matić	Citizens' Group			3,609	70.74
Mihajlo Paunović	Serbian Renewal Movement–G17 Plus (Affiliation: Serbian Renewal Movement)			1,493	29.26
Branko Ranković	Serbian Radical Party				
other candidates					
Total				5,102	100.00
