= TSV St. Johann im Pongau =

Association football club in Austria

TSV St. Johann
- Full name: TSV St. Johann im Pongau
- Founded: 1949; 77 years ago
- Ground: Sportplatz St. Johann
- Chairman: Josef Klingler sr.
- Manager: Ernst Lottermoser
- League: Regionalliga North
- 2025–26: Regionalliga West, 13th of 17
- Website: http://www.tsvmcdonalds.at
Home colours	Away colours

TSV St. Johann is an Austrian football club located in St Johann im Pongau, a town in the state of Salzburg in the west of the country. They currently play in the Regionalliga North, the third tier of Austrian football.

== Current squad ==
As of 25 December 2024

Note: Flags indicate national team as defined under FIFA eligibility rules; some limited exceptions apply. Players may hold more than one non-FIFA nationality.

No.	Pos.	Nation	Player
1	GK	AUT	Manuel Wallinger
4	DF	AUT	Kadir Özkan
5	DF	AUT	Philip Volk
6	MF	AUT	Nico Taschwer
8	MF	AUT	Stefan Sendlhofer
9	FW	AUT	Sebastian Oberkofler
10	MF	AUT	Sandro Djurić
11	FW	AUT	Benjamin Ajibade
12	FW	AUT	Yasin Yurttas
13	DF	AUT	Efe Aksoy
14	DF	BIH	Branko Ojdanić
15	FW	AUT	Aboubacar Cisse

No.	Pos.	Nation	Player
16	MF	HUN	Andreas Böcking
17	FW	AUT	Florian Ellmer
18	MF	AUT	Manuel Waltl
19	FW	TUR	Mehmet Öztürk
20	FW	AUT	Raphael Kosakiewic
22	MF	AUT	Lukas Beran
23	DF	AUT	Sebastian Pichler
24	DF	AUT	Rinor Bytyqi
33	GK	AUT	Julian Unterweger
—	DF	AUT	Johann Höllwart
—	MF	AUT	Philipp Illmer
—	MF	AUT	Philip Weiss

== See also ==
- Football in Austria
- Austrian Regional League West
