= Branko Cvetkovič =

Slovenian photographer (born 1951)

- Born: April 15, 1951 (age 75); Novo Mesto, PR Slovenia, FPR Yugoslavia (nowadays Slovenia)
- Known for: photographer and contemporary artist

Branko Cvetkovič (born April 15, 1951) is Slovenian photographer known for his philosophically conceptualized approach to photography. Working mostly with large-format cameras, his architecture photography is minimalistically structured. From symmetry he opens up the space perspective to deconstructivism, and in art there is a transition to a non-perspective suprematist plane, thus coinciding with abstract expressionism. Besides space, his main concern is the phenomenon of light itself, the two basic postulates in photography.

== Biography ==
Branko Cvetkovič was born on April 15, 1951, in Novo Mesto, Slovenia, former Yugoslavia. He graduated in political economics under the mentorship of one of the best known Yugoslavian economists, France Cerne, at the Faculty of Economics of the University of Ljubljana. After working for various research institutions, he served as an expert for manpower for the government of the Republic of Seychelles. He was also appointed as an expert for the United Nations organization Habitat.

He started to become involved with photography in 1986 and 1987 in the Seychelles. This coincidental beginning and later obsession was triggered by his fascination with light – a reminiscence of a childhood awareness of the light on the houses of his birthplace – and an emerging sensitivity to fine art, dating from his student years. Nevertheless, his first two independent, and still amateur, projects were the Creole houses and a continuous conceptual recording of the light above the island Silhouette. After his return home he abandoned his work as an economist and went on to work as an artist, a profession in his belief of greater importance and of greater and lasting value. He started to work professionally in photography; upgrading his technical skills and perception of fine art. Since 1990 he has been a free-lance photographer working mainly in architecture, industry and art; in the early years he also dealt with creative and artistic management and design.

In the years 1992 – 98 the several works were awarded, where Cvetkovič played a role as creative, conceptual or art director, co-designer and photographer.

Cvetkovič resides in Ljubljana.

== Artistic work ==
Initially, his approaches had evolved intuitively, then there was a cognition process of photography and art, involving analyses of conceptual art and minimalistic expression in Bauhaus modernism and avant-garde upgraded by Russian constructivism. In architectural photography he radicalized certain conceptual and functionalist approaches which can be compared with or are similar to those of the Bechers’ Düsseldorf school. He worked conceptually and was particularly devoted to defining spatial light and transmitting and upgrading the form or architecture of space. In spite of his highly objective aspirations in this period he could be considered a constructivist.

In his late period he established a philosophical idea of Non-Space as a totality of abstract space. In the fine art sense he transformed space into an abstract expressive image of the (suprematist) plane as the ultimate transformation of three-dimensional space into nil or zero dimension. Therefore, he discovered his artistic ambitions in the field of abstract expressionism.

== Bauhaus period ==
In his early studies, Cvetkovič found himself mainly occupied with the issue of the complexity of light and image, its disintegration into layers with various depths of field, in order to envisage a new image and to formulate or to frame it on the Bauhaus modernist plane.

In this period (1990-1995) he dealt with minimalistic and conceptual topics summed up in projects: Rocks and Water, Light within Seashells, Waves and Series of Seawater Abstractions. His projects continued with almost abstract cycles in the Bauhaus constructivist manner: Lux Plantarum (1997) and Light of Shadow – Drawing of Form (1998), both exhibited in Ljubljana.

This was the introduction leading to his most complex opus of industrial photography, still defined by the Bauhaus spirit and undertaken at the industrial premises of the Akrapovic firm in the years 1997 and 1998, continuing in 2002 and 2003: Tubes, Chinese Cosmos, Abstractions and Bauhaus . His final creation in this field was in 8x10 inches LF and was named Locomotives (2005).

== Architecture: from minimalist structuralism to deconstructivism ==
In architectural photography, Cvetkovič has made his way from structuralism to deconstructivism. At his early stage of involvement in photography, Cvetkovič had been posing himself the question of the construction of the constructivist frame on the one hand and on the other the problem of defining or constructing light within space. Thus, his architectural photography is minimalistic, rationalized and architecturally schematic. A reading of light is defined by the architectural shell itself. With this approach he autonomously developed modernist functionalist architectural photography and only in this way did he find himself side by side with the developing Düsseldorf school.

=== Old industrial architecture – archeology of light ===
His first exhibition The Old Power Station in Ljubljana in 1992, was the first in this series, as well as the continuation of his project of old industrial buildings, namely Rog and the old brick factory of Ljubljana, which were exhibited in 1997 under the title Past Spaces. In the old power station Cvetkovič did not only make a so-called archeological inventory of the building, he also introduced the archeology of spatial light. He had researched light, as one of the critics put it. In Past Spaces (1997), he had already presented architecture by sequencing the framing and "new" construction of the perspective by overturning the areas or planes of a picture similar to Russian constructivism.

=== Concept of symmetry and minimalism – Plečnik˙s Marketplace ===
Radical in his concept, Cvetkovič was presented as an architectural photographer in the full complexity of his work in 1996, with his exhibition of Plečnik's Marketplace. In this exhibition he broke with the contemporary post-modernist tradition of representing architecture in Slovenia by replacing it with a functionalist overview. The scheme and the structure of the photographic work were outlined by him during the period of the renovation of Jože Plečnik's buildings. He shaped the Plečnik's architecture in doctrinaire typology by using the symmetrical minimalist concept, perspective-corrected images of the architectural structures, consistently outlined only by a diffused non-shadow light, which became the light of an object itself. This was the method the photographer strictly implemented during the period coinciding with the emerging Düsseldorf school. The whole exhibition took place at the Municipal Gallery of Ljubljana and was accompanied by the artist's monograph. It paved the way for him to the most important cultural and professional Slovenian institutions, whilst he became distinguished with his interpretation of the architecture of their home buildings, their reconstructions and renovations. The collections of his photographs are represented as the core of the archives of the National University Library, Cankar Cultural Centre, Slovenian Philharmonic Hall, Slovenian National Opera and Ballet, Municipal Museum and Galleries of Ljubljana, the Institution for Public Health, House of Constitutional Law, etc.

=== Plečnik˙s National University Library in Ljubljana ===
Cvetkovič completed extensive work on Plečnik's architecture of the National and University Library of Slovenia (NUK) in the years 1998–1999 and 2003. The originals were taken by large format 4x5 inch and 13x18 cm Sinar P2 and Hasselblad 6x6. The lead and the principle of the photography and composition are based on the Düsseldorf school doctrine. In some cases sequential photographing was also taken into account. Truly exceptional is the photograph of the main entrance façade; for the first time in the history of the NUK this is seen and established in one perspective-corrected picture, actually amalgamated from three vertically positioned originals in 13x18 cm format. Because of the narrow street and the extent of the façade, this had hitherto been an unattainable, a constant enigmatic frustration never to be overcome.

Cvetkovič has approached Plečnik not only in his creative aspiration, but also ethically in his unconditional aspiration to perfection. In each of the photographed spaces his interest was also in its symbolic meaning. For him, in his picturing the Plečnik's architecture, the basic message was the fine art transmittance of architecture with the sequential construction of the planes with the typical reduction of the light and the maximal objectivistic and plastic construction of the space, thus positioning the Plečnik's sequencing of the classical, almost renaissance architectural space.

=== Opera House in Ljubljana ===
Almost the contrary has been achieved with Cvetkovič's architectural photography in his introspective survey of the Slovenian National Opera and Ballet Theatre in Ljubljana as a paradigmatic amphitheatric space. This extensive work was accomplished in the years 2002, 2003, 2007, 2007-2011.

=== deKons ===
In 2004 Cvetkovič exhibited his new de-constructivist series entitled Deconstruction of Light – Sequential Constructions of the Space Planes: the Spaces of Spaces, deKons for short. The oeuvre started to emerge during the renovation of the Auersperg palace and Turjaska palace. The author departed from the Düsseldorf school presentation. He radicalized the classical upright perspective; he controlled the architectural image by framing it in the sense of Russian constructivism, thus opening up the way to abstraction. This transformation enabled Cvetkovič to be liberated from the classical principle.

Indirect recording of light within the shell of the architecture as an analytical tool necessarily makes it possible to create a new abstract quality – the quality of the light as a means of the sequential decomposition of spatial framings. The author gives the explanation himself: "Therefore we do not only achieve the effect of constructing the perspective by overturning planes in two-dimensional space (in constructivist sense) but deconstruction of perspective and disintegration of planes by the act of deconstruction of light. Inversely that means creation or construction of a new abstract deconstructed space."

=== Backstage ===
Another constructivist project entitled Backstage was recorded in Cankar Cultural Centre (Cankarjev dom) in 2004 and 2005. Cvetkovič develops his idea of abstract space as a dynamic construction never defined, yet firmly built on its groundwork base, but varied in its contingency forms upon the physical optics of various projects. These are the spaces of Backstage, which both serve and model the creativity. The static picture of a construction-based form is varied to a dynamic deconstructed space, decomposed into planes; the planes that host the people as creative figures and momentary actors.

Beside the main opus, there are two special series in Backstage, denoting solely the Stage as a Podium and as a Hall. The first is designed to comply with the idea of Stage as Pollock’s fine art image plane. Cvetkovič’s photographic plane is marked by unnumbered timeless coloured traces that physically mark and embody human action on the stage for ever. The other series denotes a hall as a deconstructed space of a suprematist Malevich square plane. Each is determined and sponsored by the unique colour of the square plane. Both series are initiated and denoted by a black square – seven minutes exposure in the totally dark space of the stage – as a prelude to an abstract image of indefinable expectation on the part of the spectator.

=== En Face ===
According to several art critics, Cvetkovič reached the heights in the programmed course with the En Face exhibition in the National Gallery of Slovenia (Narodna galerija) in 2005, accompanied with the monograph – catalogue. Large format photographs with substantial enlargements, some of them digitally composed into one unified frame enlargement, speak of the façade and its embodying the technical, cultural, social and historical artefact. The façade shows itself as a connotation and determiner of the place. Quoting the author, "the only one building of certain space is the unicum of that place and that place alone becomes the only one place of that certain building". From this intentionally prefixed tautology it may be established that in his work, Cvetkovič, who has been constantly loyal to his conceptual reasoning in the photographic sense of the matter, wider in the fields of fine art and theory, has approached the Düsseldorf school most closely.

To finalize the representation of Cvetkovič oeuvre attention should be drawn to his outstanding management of space and perspective correction and his ability to impart to the image in his photography the archetypes, the timelessness and the entireness of the structured spaces as a whole or things as architectures by themselves.

== The field of abstract expressionism ==
=== Non-Space / ZeroSpace ===
In the years 2008, 2009 and 2010 Cvetkovič concluded his complex and extensive project entitled NON-SPACE / ZeroSPACE. The author goes through abstraction to the field of abstract expressionism, both conceptually and philosophically, both in the elaboration and execution of his work on 5x7 and 8x10 large format film originals. His philosophical reductionist idea of non-space is presented as an antithesis of real space. Real space has converged into anti-space, into a totality of absolute abstraction of space which in terms of fine art, after the exclusion of perspective, light and real time, denotes an abstract expressive plane as a final transformation of space. In this way the basic three fine art issues are once again introduced into modernist art discourse. These are: perspective, light and the concept of space. The transformation of space into plane confirms and challenges the idea of a black and white square plane. Cvetkovič is radical in developing his thesis. He confronts his conception of the basic fine art principles with the most human abstract and universal experience; the human comprehension of death. Within this conceptual context, with utmost consistency and vigorousness, the author elaborates his exceptional frames of vast seascapes, transforming these huge spaces into vast abstract minimalistic planes; the screens and the images are ones that have not yet been encountered in Slovenian art.

The main idea is the gradual elimination of perspective and sublime transition of space to plane – "screen". Series called Screens, with many derivations, colours and transformations, accentuate abstraction of space to an expressive two-dimensional plane. The last are those of the "Black and white plane" as the final synthesis of denomination to NON-SPACE│ZeroSPACE, concluded as a total abstraction with no dimension.

=== White lights as heaven lights ===
In spite of total reduction and final darkness, the definitive will towards total liberation, as the idea of huge space in open sky and light, emerges. It could be termed heaven's light or simply the big magic light, which outlasts and illuminates everything in all its material transformations. This light is the symbol of human mental eternal space.

White lights; open ocean spaces with vast light ruptures and immense light rays, and even bigger light chasms that literally swallow and dematerialize everything by colouring it into white dazzling lights, are the founding idea for the project that also opens up for the terminating idea of the Heaven Lights.

Much earlier than impressionists, and later abstract expressionists, William Turner was the first painter of romantic and symbolic heritage, who was mainly preoccupied with the idea of light. In his paintings: Snow Storm: Hannibal and his Army Crossing the Alps, 1812, Shade and Darkness – the Evening of the Deluge, 1843, Light and Colour – the Morning after the Deluge, 1843, he tried to introspect and consume the light as a spiritual category in its mysticism and abstraction of its highest spiritual elevation. In the first painting, the light and the sun rest under the firmament of clouds shaped like a cathedral vault. Respectively, in other above-mentioned paintings, the light is embodied in the circle that reflects the gaze into a dome. Turner's approach gave to the phenomenon of light the power for elevation that absorbs the spectator.

In the author's opinion, these are fantastic grounds for deviation into abstract, non-material, non-objective matter; confrontation of photography with the essential and most basic constitutional matter, Light. This is the reason why his project, based on introspection of sublime light, elevation from darkness into the light, and spiritual absorption, a voyage that is traced by light, could be handled and tracked by photography and its basic tool, Light.

Cvetkovič's work is based on the movement of the large format 8x10 in. camera which, with its resolution power of 8x10 in. film and long exposures, can absorb the light in its abstract images.

=== Reading of photography ===
Photography is rigorously objectivistic. Symmetries are their basic orientation points. The notion of expressiveness is accentuated by perspective and the absence of it, respectively. The series of Screen and Plane coincide with abstract expressionism. In addition, the presentiment and sensation of huge minimalistic planes with expressive supernatural connotation have to possess monumental momentum. Their modem is an abstract pattern which we, unawares, inhibit in ourselves. White Lights is mainly based on symmetries and very strong reflective light on the ocean.

== Exhibitions ==
Cvetkovič started to exhibit in 1992. His major conceptual and programmed solo exhibitions are contextualized within the description of his work.

=== Major solo exhibitions ===
- 1992 – Old Power Station Ljubljana, KUD France Prešeren, Ljubljana
- 1996 – Plečnik's Marketplace, City Art Museum Ljubljana
- 1997 – Lux Plantarum, Krka Gallery, Ljubljana
- 1997 – Past Spaces, Tiskarna Ljudske pravice, Ljubljana, selected solo exhibition of European Month of Culture
- 1998 – Light of Shadow – Drawing of Form, Cankar Cultural Centre, Ljubljana
- 2004 – deKons (Deconstruction of Light – Sequential Constructions of the Space Planes: the Spaces of Spaces), City Museum of Ljubljana
- 2005 – Backstage, Cankar Cultural Centre, Ljubljana
- 2005 – En Face, National Gallery of Slovenia, Ljubljana
- 2010 – NON-SPACE/ZeroSPACE, , Prom-Galerie, Munich
- 2018 - NON-SPACE│ZeroSPACE Gallery Božidar Jakac – former monastery church Kostanjevica na Krki Katalog:
- 2019 - Beyond Perspective, ATELJE GALERIJA, Ljubljana,
- 2019 - Into the Square, ATELJE GALERIJA, Ljubljana

=== Selected exhibitions ===
- 2006 – Figure at the beginning of century, selected exhibitions by the Slovenian Association of Fine Art Critics, Velenje ISBN 978-961-91874-0-1
- 2006 – New Photography, Zalec, selection by Ph.D. Boris Gorupic
- 2006 – Transitions, Monat der Fotografie, Vienna
- 2006 – Month of Photography, Ljubljana, by Photon Gallery
- 2007 – Politically, selected exhibitions by the Slovenian Association of Fine Art Critics, Velenje
- 2007– Vienna Fair – International Contemporary Art Fair, Vienna
- 2008 – Vienna Fair – International Contemporary Art Fair, Vienna
- 2008 – Trieste Fotografia by Photon Gallery, Narodni dom, Trieste
- 2010 – MARE NOSTRUM, selected exhibition, Galleria Forni, Bologna
- 2011 – One Season Show, by Prom-Galerie, Munich
- 2011 – The End as the Beginning, selected exhibition, Galleria Ono Arte, Bologna
- 2011 – Slovenian Photography 1991 – 2011, MAO, Ljubljana, special selected exhibition curated by Ph.D. Primoz Lampic
- 2014 – City Perspectives , Ankerbrotfabrik Vienna, selected exhibition, by Photon Gallery
- 2014 – The Protagonists of Slovenian Contemporary Art 1968 – 2013, selected by curator Aleksander Bassin, Villa Manin, Italy
- 2015 – The Protagonists of Slovenian Contemporary Art 1968 – 2013, selected by curator Aleksander Bassin, Künstlerhaus, Vienna
- 2015 – The Protagonists of Slovenian Contemporary Art 1968 – 2013, selected by curator Aleksander Bassin, Gliptoteka, Zagreb
- 2017 - All Kinds of Surprises - Viewing the Carmen Würth Collection, selected by the Director of Würth Collection C. Sylvia Weber, Museum Würth, Künzelsau - Gaisbach, Germany

=== Art market ===
Until 2006, Cvetkovič's exhibitions were strictly solo and were organized and curated by himself. After his major exhibition in Slovenian National Gallery in 2005, he started to associate with Photon Gallery based in Ljubljana. Between 2010 and 2016 he was represented by Prom-Galerie, Munich.

=== Collections ===
Cvetkovič's works are held in numerous collections and archives of Slovenian cultural institutions and by private owners, including National University Library, Cankar Cultural Centre, Slovenian National Opera and Ballet, Slovenian Philharmonic Hall, Municipal Museum and Galleries of Ljubljana, the Institution of Public Health, House of Constitutional Law, Porsche, The Carmen Würth Collection Museum Würth Kunzelsau etc.

=== Books ===
Cvetkovič has extensive bibliography with more than 125 references in the Slovenian Online Bibliographic System COBISS. His most important books are:

- "The market in Ljubljana designed by the architect Jože Plečnik", Zalozba Rokus, 1996. ISBN 961-209-033-5
- "Deconstruction of Light – Sequential Construction of the Space Plains: the Spaces of Spaces" COBISS 214121984, Mestna galerija Ljubljana, 2004
- "En face, art monograph – catalogue of the exhibition En face", 2005. ISBN 961-236-952-6
- "Branko Cvetkovič: NE-PROSTOR│Nični PROSTOR, NON-SPACE│ZeroSPACE", 2018, art monograph – catalogue on the exhibition with the same title, published by Galerija Božidar Jakac.

=== Awards ===
In the years 1992 – 1996 the following works were awarded, where Cvetkovič played a role as creative, conceptual or art director, co-designer and photographer.

- "Golden MM 1992"
- "Epica 1992"
- "Epica 1996"
