= Plamen Brankov =

Bulgarian water polo player (born 1949)

Personal information
- Nationality: Bulgarian
- Born: 14 March 1949 (age 76); Sofia, Bulgaria

Sport
- Sport: Water polo

Plamen Brankov (Bulgarian: Пламен Бранков; born 14 March 1949) is a Bulgarian water polo player. He competed in the men's tournament at the 1972 Summer Olympics.
