= Branko Benzon =

Croatian physician, diplomat & politician (1903-1970)

Ambassador of the Independent State of Croatia to Hungary
- In office 30 March 1944 – 1945
- Preceded by: Vladimir Košak
- Succeeded by: Office abolished

Ambassador of the Independent State of Croatia to Romania
- In office 1942–1944
- Preceded by: Edo Bulat
- Succeeded by: Office abolished

Ambassador of the Independent State of Croatia to Germany
- In office April 1941 – 10 October 1941
- Preceded by: Office established

Personal details
- Born: 29 August 1903 Postira, Brač, Dalmatia, Austria-Hungary
- Died: September 1970 (aged 67) Caracas, Venezuela
- Citizenship: Venezuela
- Party: Ustaše
- Education: University of Zagreb
- Occupation: Diplomat, politician
- Profession: Physician

Branko Benzon (29 August 1903 – September 1970) was a Croatian physician, diplomat and politician.

== Pre-war life ==
Benzon was born in Postira, on the island Brač in 1903. He attended medical school at the University of Zagreb, Faculty of Medicine where he specialized in cardiology. He published a number of works dealing with pathology and the treatment of heart disease. Soon he became primarius of the section for heart diseases in Merkur's Sanatorium in Zagreb (today's Clinical Hospital Merkur).

Even though he was a respectable doctor, he was fired in 1932 for his political attitudes. He was member of the Ustaše branch in Croatia with a pro-German orientation. When Vladko Maček filed a complaint against him to the court, Benzon fled to Slovakia. Soon he emigrated to Germany where he led the radio-station, "Velebit". He represented Ustaše for Germany at the time. In the name of Ante Pavelić and Mile Budak on 31 March 1940, he transmitted a memorandum to the Foreign Minister of Germany, Joachim von Ribbentrop in which he asked for German support in the creation of Croatian state within its historical boundaries.

== Diplomatic career and emigration ==
With the proclamation of the Independent State of Croatia, he returned to Zagreb and joined the political leadership. He was named Croatian Ambassador to Germany in April 1941, but because of diplomatic misbehaviour, was forced to resign on 10 October 1941. In 1942, he became Croatian Ambassador to Romania, and from 1944 until 1945, was Ambassador to Hungary. His involvement in the Lorković-Vokić coup put him in disagreement with Croatian leadership and did not return to Zagreb.

After the war he went to Spain and then emigrated to Argentina where he worked in Direction for Immigrants. After the fall of his friend President Juan Domingo Perón in 1955, he went to Venezuela and became chief of section in the American hospital in Caracas.

While in Central America, he established a smuggling ring for getting Nazi war criminals out of Europe. Benzon was responsible for bringing over 100 former officers overseas, including Josef Mengele, the infamous doctor from Auschwitz known for his human experiments. The war criminals came from cities around the globe where they contacted Argentinian spies and Italian sympathisers, receiving new identities and papers classifying them as technicians.
