= Branko Tošović =

Austrian and Serbian linguist (born 1949)

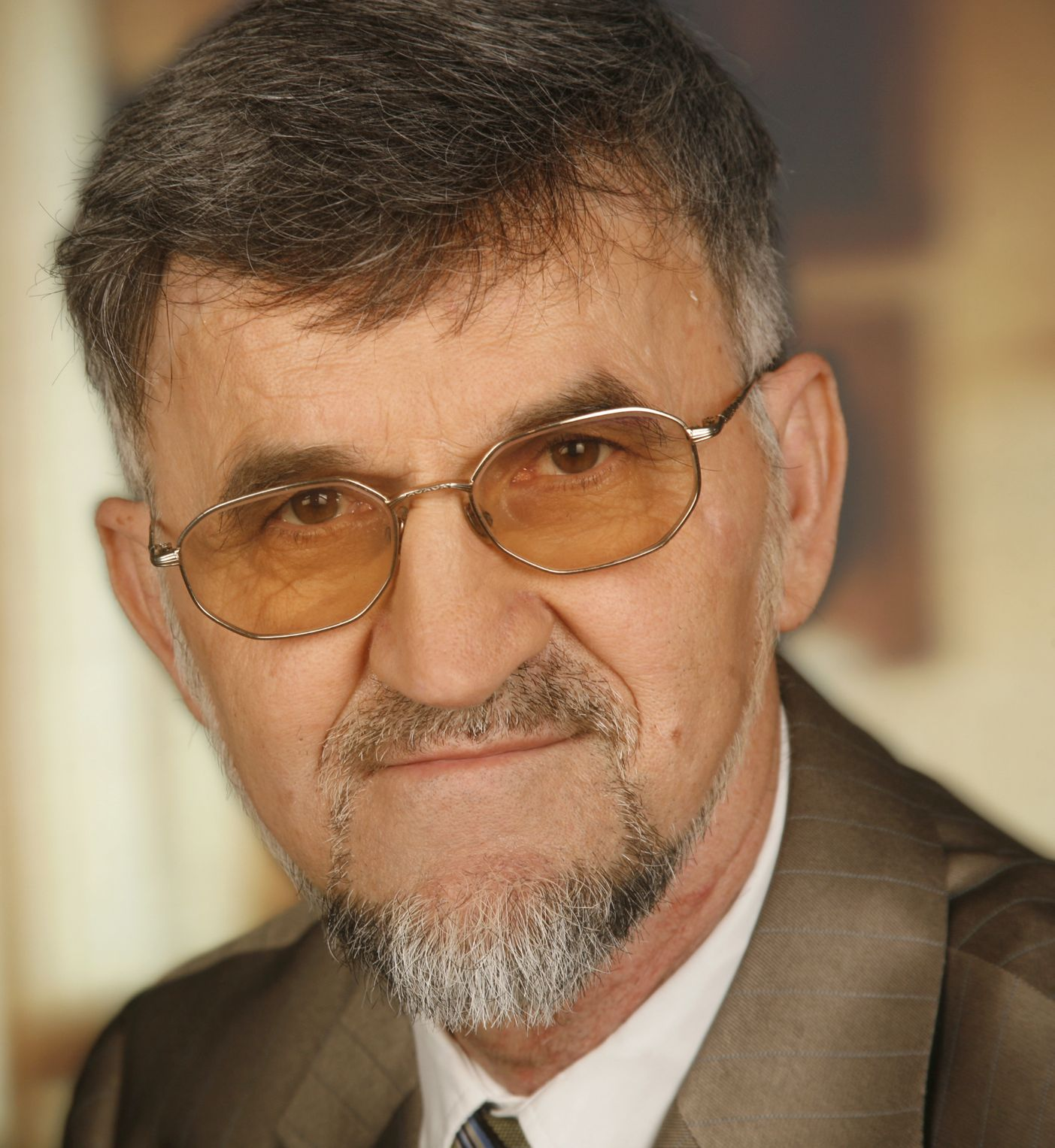
Portrait of Branko Tošović

Branko Tošović (German: Branko Tosovic, Serbian Cyrillic: Бранко Тошовић, Russian: Бранко Тошович; born 10 April 1949) is an Austrian and Serbian philologist, linguist and literary scholar.

== Life ==
Branko Tošović was born on 10 April 1949 in Vihovići (Kalinovik), not far from Sarajevo. In 1968 he finished high school in Sarajevo. He grew up in Kalinovik and Sarajevo (Bosnia and Herzegovina), where he studied, received his doctorate and completed his habilitation. From 1968 to 1973 he studied Slavic Studies at the University of Sarajevo. In January 1979 he received his doctorate with a dissertation titled The Stylizations of Language in A. N. Tolstoy's novel Peter the First and its reflection in our translation (Stilizacija jezika u djelu Petar Prvi A. N. Tolstoja i njihov odraz u našem prevodu). In October 1983 he habilitated with the topic The verb as a constituent of the style of the fine literature of Russian compared to Serbo-Croatian (Glagol kao konstituent književnoumjetničkog stila ruskoga jezika u poređenju sa srpskohrvatskim). He spent the months from April to October 1992 in besieged Sarajevo, where he participated in humanitarian aid to children in Bosnia and Herzegovina and Sarajevo as deputy chairman of the civil aid initiative First Children's Embassy of the World - Međaši.

== Lecturing activities ==
He worked in several countries (Bosnia and Herzegovina, Croatia, Germany, Austria, Russia) and at different universities. From 1973-1976 he was a teacher at the Ognjen Prica Grammar School in Sarajevo. From 1976 to 1992 he worked at the chair of Slavic Studies at the University of Sarajevo - first as an assistant, then as a lecturer and from 1983 as a professor. From 1984-1985 and 1989-1991 he was head of this chair. 1985-1988 he was a lecturer of Serbo-Croatian at the Moscow University. He spent the academic year 1988/89 in Moscow, where he worked as an academic. On October 15, 1992, he arrived in Moscow again and again took up a position as a lecturer of Serbo-Croatian at the Moscow University. He was also a senior research fellow at the Institute of Linguistics of the Russian Academy of Sciences and a senior research fellow at the Pushkin Institute for the Russian Language. In the summer semester of 1992/93, he gave a lecture course "Contrastive stylistics of Russian and Serbo-Croatian verbs" at the Moscow State University for students of Slavic philology. In the academic years 1993/94-1995/96, he taught as a visiting professor at the Slavic Department of the University of Mannheim. For the summer semester of 1995, he lectured at the Institute for Slavic Studies at the University of Leipzig on "The Correlations between the Verbal Forms of the Serbo-Croatian Language" and the main seminar entitled "The System of Verbal Forms of the Serbo-Croatian and German Language". From 1996 to 2016 he was a full professor at the Institute for Slavic Studies at the Karl-Franzens-University of Graz, which he headed for two years. He became an emeritus professor on 30 September 2016. Since then he continued guest lecturing and speaking at various scientific conferences. He gave a lecture on "Current state of Internet stylistic" at the Moscow State University in March 2018. He spoke at “The Present and Future of Style” conference at the Moscow State University in May 2019.

== Scientific activity ==
His main interests are in the fields of grammar, general and contrastive linguistics (broader linguistic fields), verbs, correlations between Slavic languages, especially between very close languages such as Bosnian, Croatian and Serbian (narrower linguistic fields), stylistics (functional stylistics, Internet stylistics), corpus linguistics, literature and poetics (the opus of Ivo Andrić, Branko Ćopić and Blaže Koneski).

Since 1998 he has been a member of the Commission on Slavic Word Formation and since 2013 of the Commission for Slavic Stylistics at the International Slavic Committee.

=== Research projects ===
He founded, directed or leads the following scientific projects:

1. The differences between Bosnian, Croatian and Serbian, FWF project, P19158-G03, 2006-2010:. Within the framework of this project he developed

- Gralis-Korpus (Grailis corpus) - a 'multilingual parallel corpus' for the study and learning of all Slavic languages, especially with regard to German
- Akzentarium - online program for research and learning the accent system of the languages Bosnian, Croatian and Serbian.
- Lexikarium - Online Dictionary for Teaching and Research on the lexical structures of Bosnian, Croatian and Serbian
- MorphoGenerator - online tool for morphosyntactic annotation and subsequent automatic analysis of words of the languages Bosnian, Croatian and Serbian

2. The comparative analysis of the semantic-derivative category of action types in the Slavic languages / Studium porównawcze nad kategorią semantyczno-słowotwórczą action types w językach slowiańskich (Ministry Nauki i Szkolnictwa Wyższego, N104012 31/0898, 2006-2009)

3. New Slavic horizons (student project), from 2013

Two research projects are currently running under his leadership: "Andrić initiative: Ivo Andrić in the European context" (Graz: 2007-), "The lyrical, humorous and satirical world of Branko Ćopić" (Graz - Banja Luka: 2011-)

=== Online projects ===
On 1 March 2000, he founded Gralis - the linguistic Slavic Studies portal of the Karl-Franzens-University Graz.

== Bibliography ==
The bibliography of his published scientific works comprises approx. 500 titles published in all Slavic-speaking countries (Bosnia and Herzegovina, Bulgaria, Croatia, Montenegro, Macedonia, Poland, Russia, Serbia, Slovakia, Slovenia, Czech Republic, Ukraine and Belarus), in non-Slavic-speaking countries (Germany, Estonia, Japan and Austria) and in the following languages: Bosnian/Croatian/Serbian, German, English, Macedonian and Russian Google Scholar lists over 70 scientific titles published by Branko Tošović.

== Miscellaneous ==
From 1989 to 1991 Tošović was chairman of the Society for Applied Linguistics of Bosnia and Herzegovina, from 1991 to 1994 he was a member of the Presidium of the International Association of Russian Teachers as a representative of the former Yugoslavia. In 1990 he was accepted as a member of the Social Scientific Advisory Board Mother Tongue of the Soviet Cultural Fund.

Tošović was appointed honorary member of the Slavic Society of Serbia for the global strengthening of Slavic Studies and for his results in Slavic language research.
