= Branko Vodnik =

Croatian philologist (1879–1926)

- Born: 26 February 1879; Varaždin, Croatia-Slavonia, Austria-Hungary
- Died: 14 June 1926 (aged 47); Zagreb, Kingdom of Serbs, Croats and Slovenes (now Croatia)
- Other names: Branko Drechsler
- Occupations: Philologist, literary historian

Branko Vodnik (born Branko Drechsler; 26 February 1879 – 14 June 1926) was a Croatian literary historian.

== Biography ==
Vodnik pursued Slavic studies in Zagreb, Prague, and Kraków. Vodnik taught Croatian literature at schools in Karlovac, Osijek, and Zagreb. He became a professor of Croatian literature at the University of Zagreb in 1911 and held the position until his death. His most significant work is the History of Croatian Literature: From the Humanism to the late 18th Century (Croatian: Povijest hrvatske književnosti: od humanizma do potkraj XVIII. stoljeća) published in 1913 as the first part of a two-volume history. The second volume covering the subsequent period remains unfinished, kept as fragmentary work in the Croatian State Archives.

== Bibliography ==
- Maštrović, Tihomir, ed. (2001). Zbornik o Branku Vodniku, književnom povjesničaru [Collection of Papers on Branko Vodnik, Literary Historian] (PDF). Znanstveni zbornici (in Serbo-Croatian). Vol. 6. Hrvatski studiji Sveučilišta u Zagrebu. ISBN 953-6682-22-2.
  - Jembrih, Alojz (2001). "Branko Drechsler (Vodnik) u zrcaku svojih pisama Vatroslavu Jagiću" [Ivan Milčetić and Branko Vodnik]. Zbornik o Branku Vodniku, književnom povjesničaru (PDF). Znanstveni zbornici (in Serbo-Croatian). Vol. 6. Hrvatski studiji Sveučilišta u Zagrebu. pp. 265–282. ISBN 953-6682-22-2.
