= FK Župa Superpetrol =

Football club based in Republika Srpska, Bosnia and Herzegovina

FK Župa Milosavci
- Full name: Fudbalski Klub Župa Superpetrol (Football Club Župa Superpetrol)
- Nickname(s): Žuto-Plavi (Yellow-Blue), Novi Brazil (New Brazil)
- Founded: 20 August 1977 (35 years ago)
- Ground: Stadium SC Župa
- Capacity: 1,000
- Chairman: Dragiša Savić
- Manager: Ljubiša Vrhovac
- League: Second League of Republika Srpska
- 2014–15: Second League of Republika Srpska – West, 12th
Home colours	Away colours

FK Župa Superpetrol (Serbian Cyrillic: ФК Жупа Суперпетрол) is a football club based in the village of Milosavci, Republika Srpska, Bosnia and Herzegovina. It competes in the Second League of Republika Srpska.

The club was founded on August 20, 1977, in the village Kriškovci. They play their matches on Stadium Bare, which capacity is 1,000 seats.

Team colors are yellow and blue.
