= Branko Galoić =

Croatian Musician

Branko Galoic is a singer/songwriter and guitarist from Ivanić-Grad, Croatia.

== Career ==
Galoic started to play music at the age of 17 and is autodidactic.

He recorded the album One With the Wind with Portuguese guitarist Francisco Cordovil and, in the same year, he recorded another album Carnet de Voyages, that was released by French record label SuperPitch.

Galoic has played hundreds of concerts around Europe, including some notable festivals such as the Rudolstadt-Festival, where he played in front of 10,000 people with his Skakavac (Grasshopper) Orchestra. His eclectic style is described as Balkan music mixed with different styles.

Galoic has recorded 7 albums and lives in Paris.
