= Kursalon Hübner =

Music hall in Vienna

Coordinates: 48.2031°N 16.3775°E

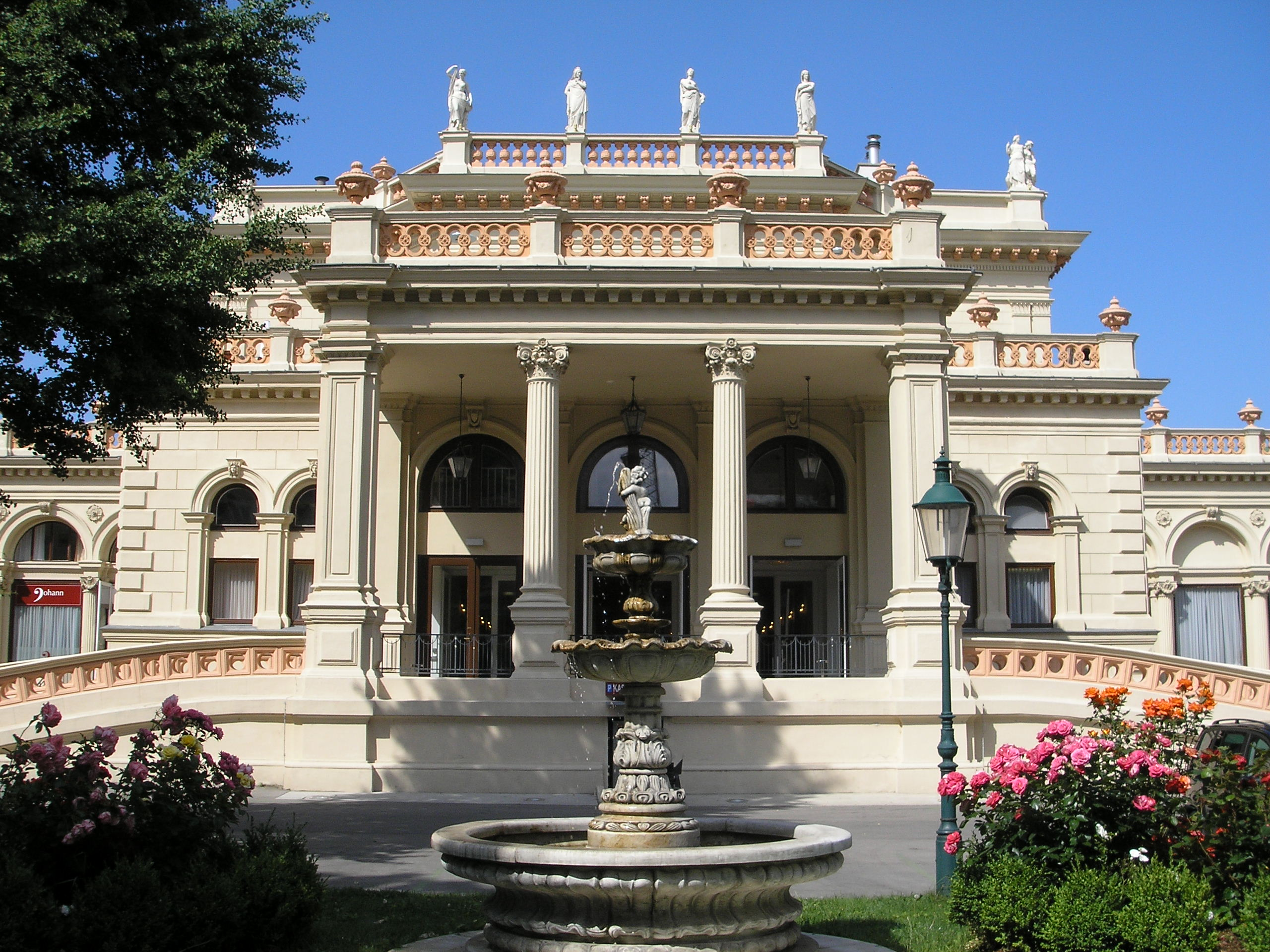
Kursalon Hübner

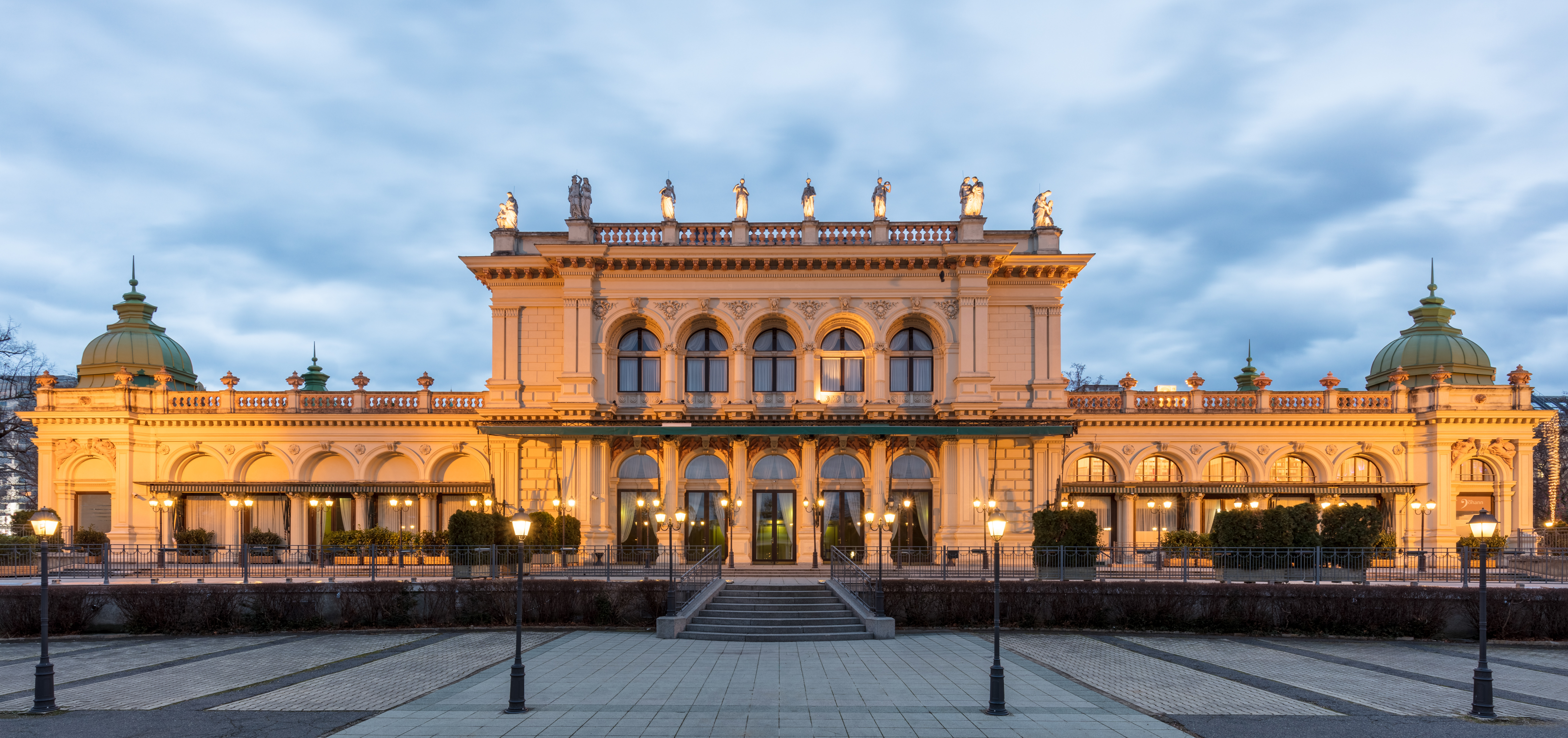
Kursalon view from park side

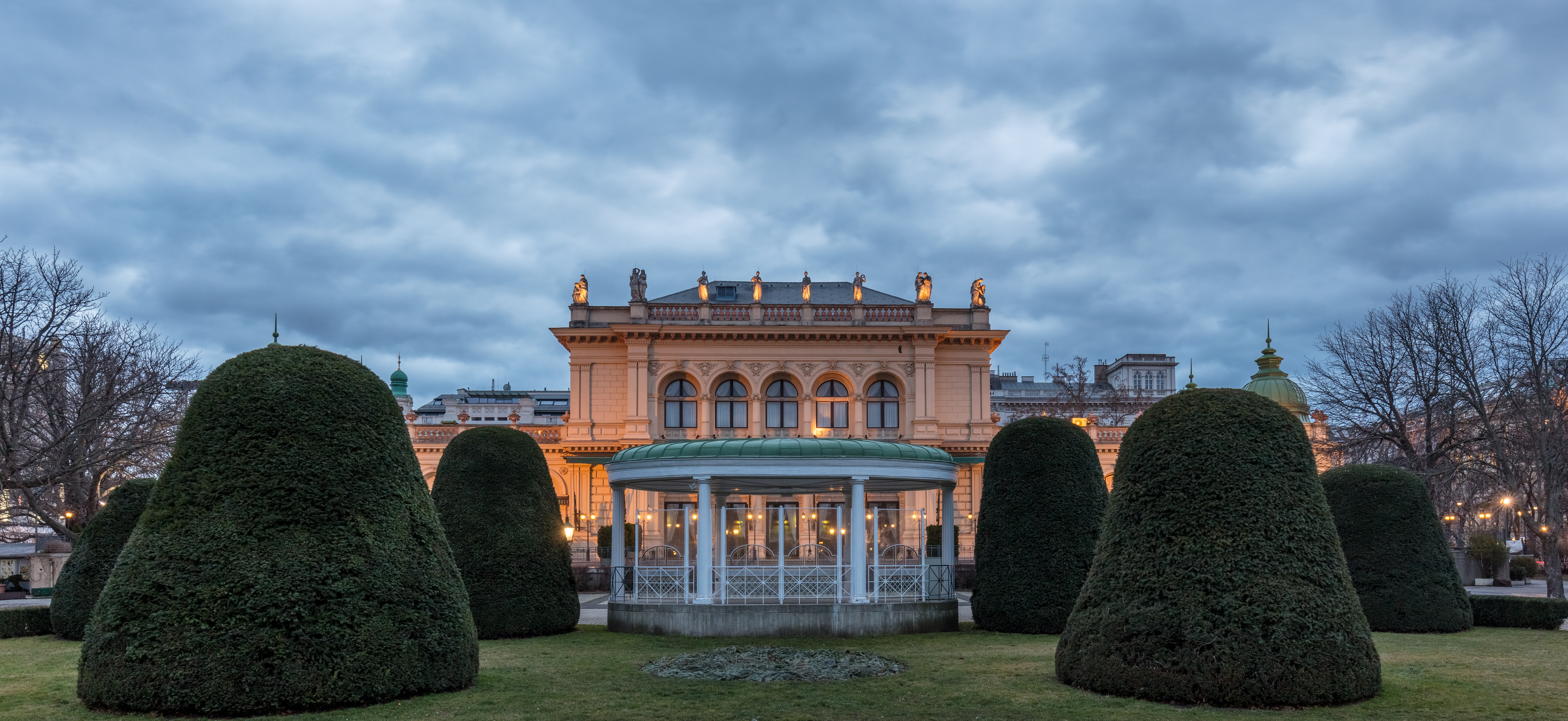
View by night

Kursalon (Kursalon Hübner) is a music hall in Vienna, designed by Johann Garben in the style of the Italian Renaissance and built between 1865 and 1867.

== History ==
In 1857, Emperor Franz Josef I ordered the demolition of all of the fortifications, which were replaced by the Ring Boulevard as the city expanded. 1862 marked the opening of 65,000 m^{2} City Park, located in adjacent territory and designed by the landscape painter Josef Selleny. The Kursalon served as a place where visitors could get mineral waters to drink. Any amusements and social events were not allowed. But with the completion the venue saw changes. In 1868 the first concert by Johann Strauss took place in the Kursalon. Since then, the venue became a place for concerts and meetings. In 1908 the Kursalon was rented by Hans Hübner. Thus, its second name the place inherited from its owner. In the late 1990s the city government decided to sell the venue to the Hübner family.

== Description ==
Now the Kursalon comprises four ballrooms on two floors, a 1,000 square meter large terrace, and a restaurant. The Kursalon sees approximately 500 concerts per year and receives over 200,000 visitors. The Alt Wien orchestra is constantly presenting in the Kursalon. There are works of Strauss, Mozart, Beethoven, Schubert on its repertoire. Apart from concerts, the Kursalon serves as a place for conferences, balls, weddings, and is one of the main tourist attractions in Vienna.
