= Branko Zupan =

Slovenian footballer and manager

Personal information
- Full name: Branko Zupan
- Date of birth: 22 September 1964 (age 62)
- Place of birth: Maribor, SFR Yugoslavia
- Position: Goalkeeper

Youth career
- Kovinar Maribor

Senior career*
Years	Team	Apps	(Gls)
1985–1986	Koper	10	(0)
1986–1988	Olimpija		
1988–1991	Koper		
1991–1993	Gorica	71	(0)
1993–1996	Celje	92	(0)

International career
1993–1996	Slovenia	8	(0)

Managerial career
- 1990–1991: Koper
- 1992: Gorica
- 1996: Koper
- 1997: Gorica
- 1998–1999: Triglav Kranj
- 1999–2000: Koper
- 2000–2002: Izola
- 2002–2003: Slovenia U15/U16
- 2002–2004: Slovenia U19
- 2004–2007: Slovenia U21
- 2013–2014: Kras Repen
- * Club domestic league appearances and goals

Branko Zupan (born 22 September 1964) is a Slovenian football manager and former player who played as a goalkeeper.

== Playing career ==
Zupan made his debut for Slovenia in an October 1993 friendly match against Macedonia and earned a total of 8 caps, until 1996.
