= Branko Mitrovic =

Serbian-Norwegian architectural historian

Branko Mitrovic is a Serbian-Norwegian architectural historian and theorist who has backgrounds in both philosophy and architecture. Currently, he teaches history and theory of architecture at the Department of Architecture and Technology in the Norwegian University of Science and Technology. His main concern is the relationship between philosophical views and architectural theory focusing on visuality and philosophy of history He had achieved many honors and fellowships including Humboldt Research Award (2008), a Harvard University research fellowship, Senior Fellowship of National Gallery of Art in Washington.

== Education ==
He completed his Bachelor degrees in both architecture (1988) and philosophy (1992) from the University of Belgrade in Serbia. Then he moved to the University of Pennsylvania to continue his education in master of architecture. After that he received two PhDs, one from the University of Pennsylvania in Architecture (1996) and another from the University of Auckland in Philosophy (2007).

== Bibliography ==
- Mitrovic, Branko. (2026) Guarino Guarini: Baroque Architecture and Scholasticism. Brill. ISBN 978-9004745988
- Mitrovic, Branko. (2022) Architectural Principles in the Age of Fraud. Oro Books. ISBN 978-1954081451
- Mitrovic, Branko. (2020) Materialist Philosophy of History. A Realist Antidote to Postmodernism. Lexington Books. ISBN 978179362002
- Mitrovic, Branko. (2015) Rage and Denials. Collectivist Philosophy, Politics and Art Historiography, 1890–1947. Penn State University Press. ISBN 978-0-271-06678-3
- Visuality for Architects: Architectural Creativity and Modern Theories of Perception and Imagination. (2013). University of Virginia Press. ISBN 978-0-271-06678-3
- Mitrovic, Branko. (2011) Philosophy for Architects. Princeton Architectural Press. ISBN 1568989946.
- Mitrovic, Branko. (2005) Serene Greed of the Eye. Leon Battista Alberti and the Philosophical Foundations of Renaissance Architectural Theory. Deutscher Kunstverlag. ISBN 9780813933788.
- Mitrovic, Branko. (2004) Learning from Palladio. W.W. Norton. ISBN 0393731162.
