= Romanovsky (surname) =

Romanovsky (masculine), Romanovskaya (feminine) is a Russian surname. Other Slavic equivalents: Romanowski (Polish), Ramanauskas (Lithuanian), Ramanouski/Ramanouskaya (Belarusian), Romanovskyy/Romanovska (Ukrainian). All are toponymic surnames derived from any of locations named Romanów, Romany, or Romanowo, the latter names literally meaning "belonging to Roman."

Notable people with the surname include:

== Russian ==
- Alexander Romanovsky (chess player) (1880–1943), Lithuanian–Russian chess master
- Alexander Romanovsky (pianist) (born 1984), Ukrainian classical pianist
- Elena Romanovskaya, Russian ice dancer
- Ivan Romanovsky (1877–1920), general in the Imperial Russian Army and White movement
- Princess Natalia Romanovskaya-Iskander (1917–1999), daughter of Prince Romanovsky-Iskander, son of Grand Duke Nicholas Constantinovich of Russia
- Paul Ilyinsky (Paul Romanovsky-Ilyinsky), 1928–2004), former mayor of Palm Beach, Florida and a son of Grand Duke Dmitry Pavlovich of Russia
- Peter Romanovsky (1892–1964), chess player
- Vladimir Zakharovich Romanovsky (1896-1967), Soviet general
- Vladimir Romanovsky (1957–2013), Soviet sprint canoeist
- Vsevolod Ivanovich Romanovsky (1879–1954), Russian-Soviet-Uzbek mathematician

== Belarusian ==
- Aliaksandra Ramanouskaya (born 1996), Belarusian freestyle skier.

== Ukrainian ==
- Olga Romanovska, Ukrainian singer and model
