= Romanowski =

Romanowski (feminine Romanowska, plural Romanowscy) is a Polish surname derived from any of the locations named Romanów, Romany, or Romanowo, in their turn derived from the given name Roman. Other equivalents: Romanovsky/Romanovskiy (Russian), Ramanouski (Belarusian), Ramanauskas (Lithuanian).

Notable people with the surname include:

- Alina Romanowski (born 1955), American career diplomat
- Anna Romanowska, Polish mathematician
- Bill Romanowski (born 1966), American football player
- Bolesław Romanowski (1910–1968), Polish World War II submarine commander
- Edward Romanowski (1944–2007), Polish athlete
- Eileen Romanowski (born 1984), Australian volleyball player
- Elżbieta Romanowska (born 1983), Polish actress
- Franklin Delano Romanowski, fictional character from Seinfeld
- Marcin Romanowski (born 1976), Polish politician, since January 2024 deputy representative of the Sejm in the Parliamentary Assembly of the Council of Europe.
- Mieczysław Romanowski (1833–1863), Polish poet
- Rafał Romanowski (born 1978), Polish politician
- Sławomir Romanowski (born 1957), Polish sports shooter
- Wiesław Romanowski (born 1952), Polish publicist
