= Ramanauskas =

Ramanauskas is the masculine form of a Lithuanian family name. Its feminine forms are: Ramanauskienė (married woman or widow) and Ramanauskaitė (unmarried woman). It is a Lithuanized form of the Polish surname Romanowski. Other Slavic equivalents: Romanovsky/Romanovskiy (Russian), Ramanouski (Belarusian). All are toponymic surnames derived from any of locations named Romanów, Romany, or Romanowo, with all of them being derived from the given name Roman."

Notable people with the surname include:

- Adam Ramanauskas (born 1980), Australian rules footballer
- Adolfas Ramanauskas (1918–1957), Lithuanian anti-Soviet partisan
- Algis Ramanauskas (Algirdas Ramanauskas) (born 1970), Lithuanian entertainer
- Auksutė Ramanauskaitė-Skokauskienė, Lithuanina engineer and politician, M.P.
- Rita Ramanauskaitė (born 1970), Olympic javelin thrower
- Johnny Ramensky (1905–1972), born Jonas Ramanauskas, Scottish career criminal
