= Roman =

Roman most often refers to:

- Related to Rome, the capital city of Italy
- Related to the Roman people, historical civilization
  - Ancient Rome, the phase of Roman civilization from the 8th century BC to the 5th century AD
  - Eastern Roman Empire
    - East Romans or Byzantines, the people of the Eastern Roman Empire
  - Rum millet
    - Romioi

Roman may also refer to the following:

== Arts and entertainment ==
- The Roman, a 1964 novel by Mika Waltari

=== Music ===
- Roman (album), by Sound Horizon, 2006
- Roman (EP), by Teen Top, 2011
- "Roman (My Dear Boy)", a 2004 single by Morning Musume

=== Film and television ===
- Film Roman, an American animation studio
- Roman (film), a 2006 American suspense-horror film
- The Romans (Doctor Who), an episode of the TV series Doctor Who

== People ==
- Roman (given name)
- Roman (surname)

== Places ==
- Roman, Bulgaria
  - Roman Municipality
- Roman, Eure, France
- Roman, Romania
  - Roman County, a historic county
- Roman, Sakha Republic, Russia
- Roman River, Essex, England
- Roman Valley, Nova Scotia, Canada

== Organizations and brands ==
- Roman (consulting firm), communications and public affairs consultancy
- Roman (company), now Ro, a digital health company
- Roman (vehicle manufacturer), or ROMAN, a Romanian truck manufacturer

== Other uses ==
- The Catholic Church, also known as the Roman Catholic Church, the world's largest Christian denomination
  - The Latin Church within the Catholic Church
  - Roman Catholic (term)
- Nancy Grace Roman Space Telescope, also known as the Roman Space Telescope, a NASA initiative
- Roman script or Latin script, graphic signs based on letters of the classical Latin alphabet
- Roman numerals, numbers from Ancient Rome
- Roman type, one of the three main kinds of historical type

== See also ==
- Roman language (disambiguation)
- Romanesque (disambiguation)
- Romani (disambiguation)
- Romans (disambiguation)
