= Romani =

Romani may refer to:

== Ethnic groups ==
- Romani people, an ethnic group of Indo-Aryan origin
  - Romani language, an Indo-Aryan macrolanguage of the Romani communities
  - Romanichal, Romani subgroup in the United Kingdom
- Romanians (Romanian: români), Romance-speaking ethnic group and nation

== Places ==
- Români (river), in Romania
- Români, Neamț, Romania, a village and commune
- Români, Băbeni, Romania, a village
- Baurci-Moldoveni (formerly Români), Moldova, a village
- Battle of Romani, near the Egyptian town of the same name

== Other uses ==
- Romani (name), including a list of people with the name
- Romani (grape), or Trebbiano

== See also ==
- Romany (disambiguation)
- Rom (disambiguation)
- Roma (disambiguation)
- List of Romani people
- Names of the Romani people
- "Romani ite domum", corrected Latin phrase for graffiti in the film Monty Python's Life of Brian
- Romani Holocaust, against European Roma and Sinti peoples during the Holocaust era
