= Alexander Romanovsky =

Alexander Romanovsky may refer to:

- Alexander Romanovsky (chess player) (1880–1943), Lithuanian-Russian chess master
- Alexander Romanovsky (ice hockey) (born 1987), Russian ice hockey player
- Alexander Romanovsky (pianist) (born 1984), Ukrainian classical pianist
