= Casa de les Punxes =

Building in Barcelona, Spain

- La Casa de les Punxes
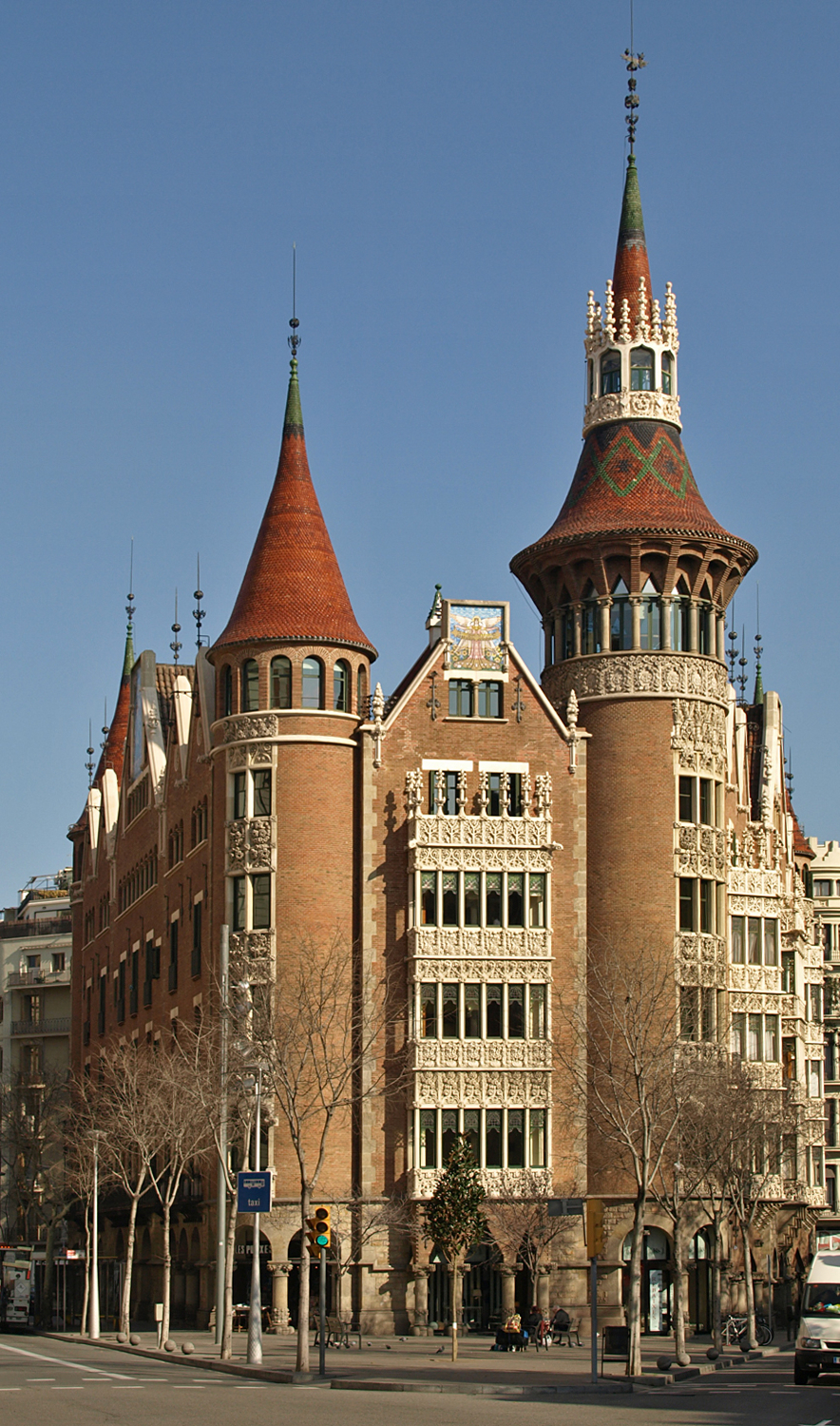
- Interactive map of the Casa de les Punxes area
- Alternative names: Casa Terradas

General information
- Architectural style: Modernist
- Location: Barcelona, Catalonia, Spain, Avinguda Diagonal, 416–420
- Construction started: 1905
- Owner: Privately owned

Technical details
- Material: Stone, forge and stained glass work

Design and construction
- Architect: Josep Puig i Cadafalch

Website
- https://www.casalespunxes.com/

Spanish Cultural Heritage
- Type: Non-movable
- Criteria: Monument
- Designated: 9 January 1976
- Reference no.: RI-51-0004201

The Casa de les Punxes or Casa Terradas is a building designed by the Modernista architect Josep Puig i Cadafalch. Located in the intersection between the streets of Rosselló, Bruc and the Avinguda Diagonal in the Barcelona Eixample area.

== Introduction ==
Designed by Modernista architect Josep Puig i Cadafalch, la Casa de les Punxes is located in the intersection of the three surrounding streets Avinguda Diagonal, Carrer Rosselló and Carrer Bruc, in the Eixample of Barcelona.

In 1905, Bartomeu Terradas Brutau commissioned Josep Puig i Cadafalch to design a house for each of his three sisters, Angela, Josefa and Rosa. The result was a building reminiscent of old medieval castles, with elements of different architectural trends and various technical innovations, with six pointed towers (crowned by conical spikes), one of its distinctive features which gave the popular name of Casa de les Punxes.

This spectacular building is one of the most emblematic of Barcelona, as well as being key to understanding the movement of Catalan Modernism. Declared a historical monument of National Interest in 1976, Casa de les Punxes is one of the most emblematic buildings in Barcelona. It is now privately owned, with space for different offices.

La Casa de les Punxes, also known as Casa Terradas, underwent rehabilitation work in 2016 inside one of the buildings. These renovations were executed under the guidance of architect Jaume Falguera.

It has always been a tourist attraction thanks to its façade and its location among other tourist spots of the city such as La Pedrera or La Sagrada Família.

== History ==
=== The Terradas Brutau family ===
Bartomeu Terradas i Mont, born in Figueres in 1846 and died in Barcelona on December 17, 1901, was a recognized textile industrialist married to sabadellense Àngela Brutau, daughter of Bonaventura Brutau Estop, one of the first Catalan textile entrepreneurs, with whom he had four children: Rosa, Bartomeu, Josefa and Àngela.

Bartomeu Terradas i Mont, despite leaving his son as heir, did not forget the welfare of the women in the family and left a small monetary fortune divided between the three daughters and his wife. Thanks to part of this heritage, the construction of a building for the three sisters was financed; the building works were managed by the brother, who commissioned the project to his friend, the architect Puig i Cadafalch which concurred with ideas as current as giving a central European vision to the three houses which together form La Casa de les Punxes.

In late 1903, Josep Puig i Cadafalch came across the commission to design a house for each of the sisters Terradas Brutau on the terrain located between the Carrer Rosselló Avinguda Diagonal and Carrer Bruc. It was an atypical solar, irregularly shaped fruit of the recent urbanized Eixample.

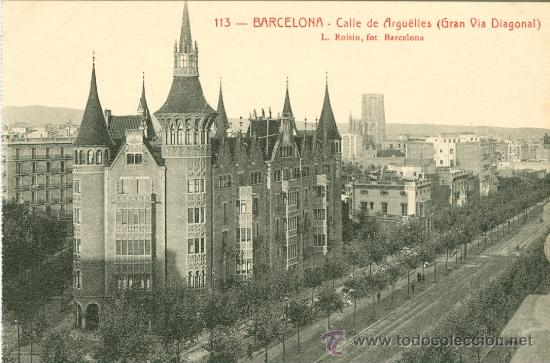
Casa de les Punxes aforetime

The architect created an interesting project with a medieval feel, seamlessly blending the three buildings to look like a single house, a single building block. The building was to be built on a triangular site, which meant the architect could not follow Cerdàs' urban plan. The new design was inspired by the Wagner-inspired fashion in northern Europe, a block with 6 corners, coinciding with the intersection of the three surrounding streets Avinguda Diagonal, Carrer Rosselló and Carrer Bruc of Barcelona.

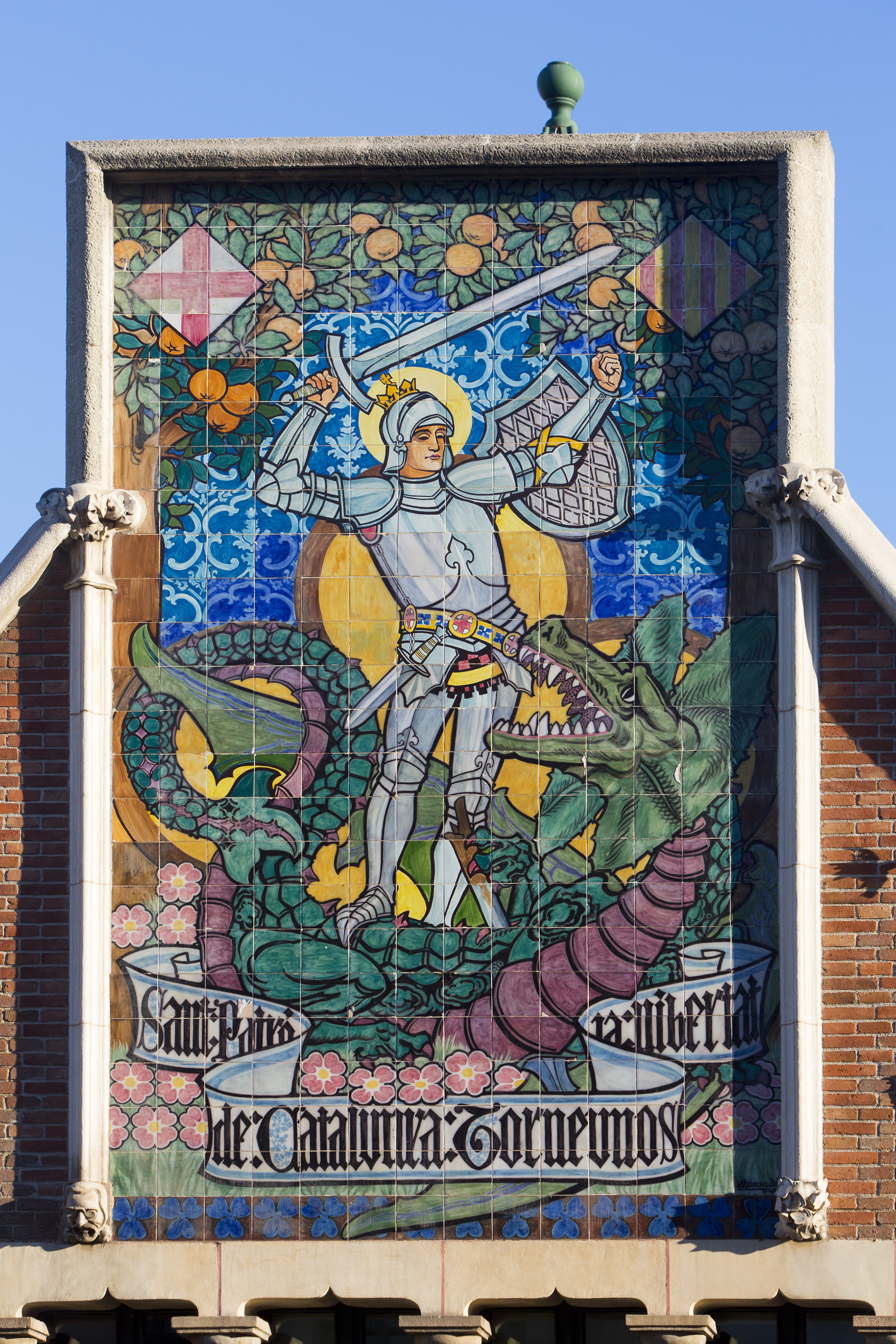
Mural Sant Jordi

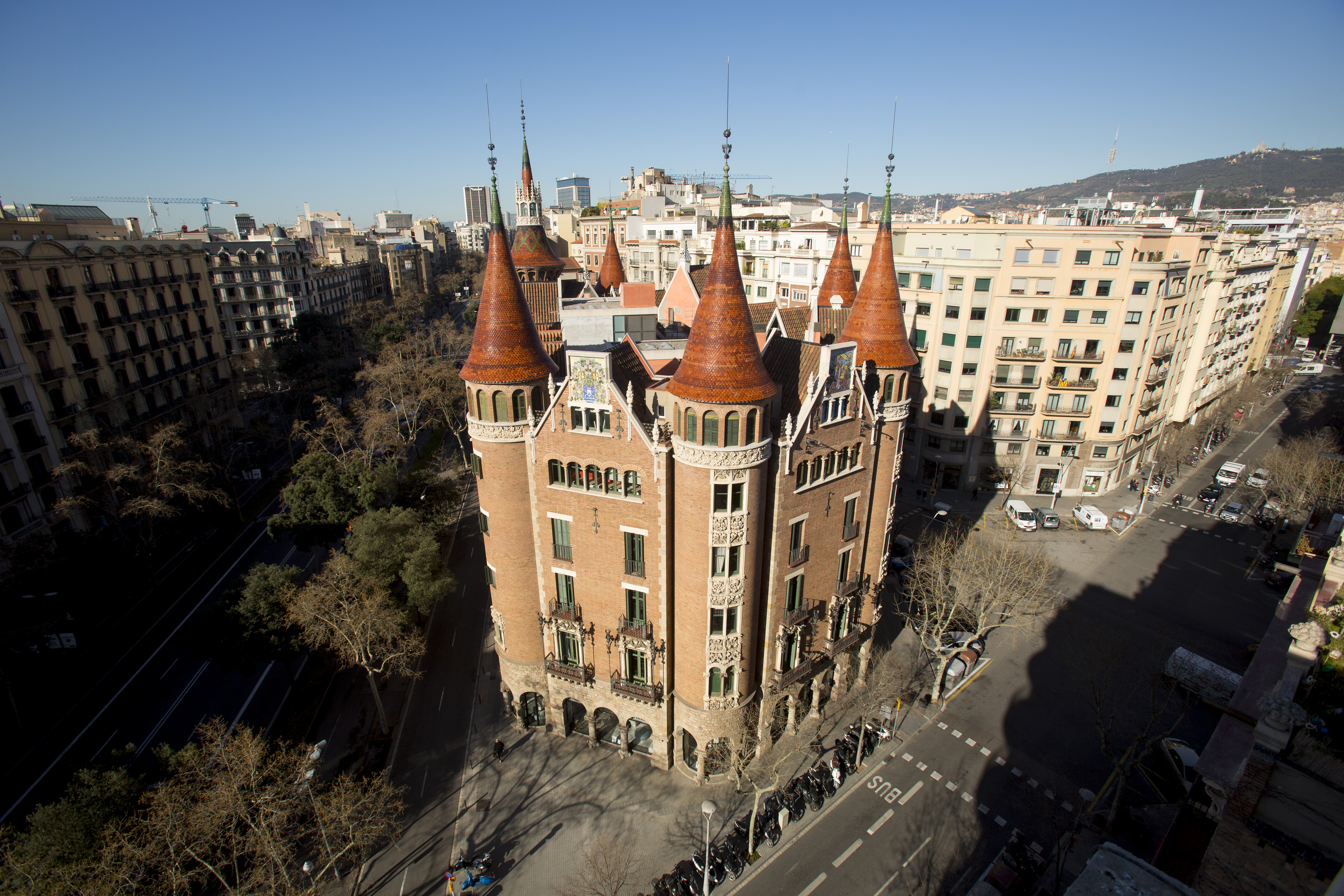
Casa de les Punxes currently

== Description ==
=== Façade ===
==== Decoration and ornamentation of casa Terradas ====
The will of the architect was to structurally and architecturally appear like a detached building; however decorative elements also make reference to the ownership of the houses.

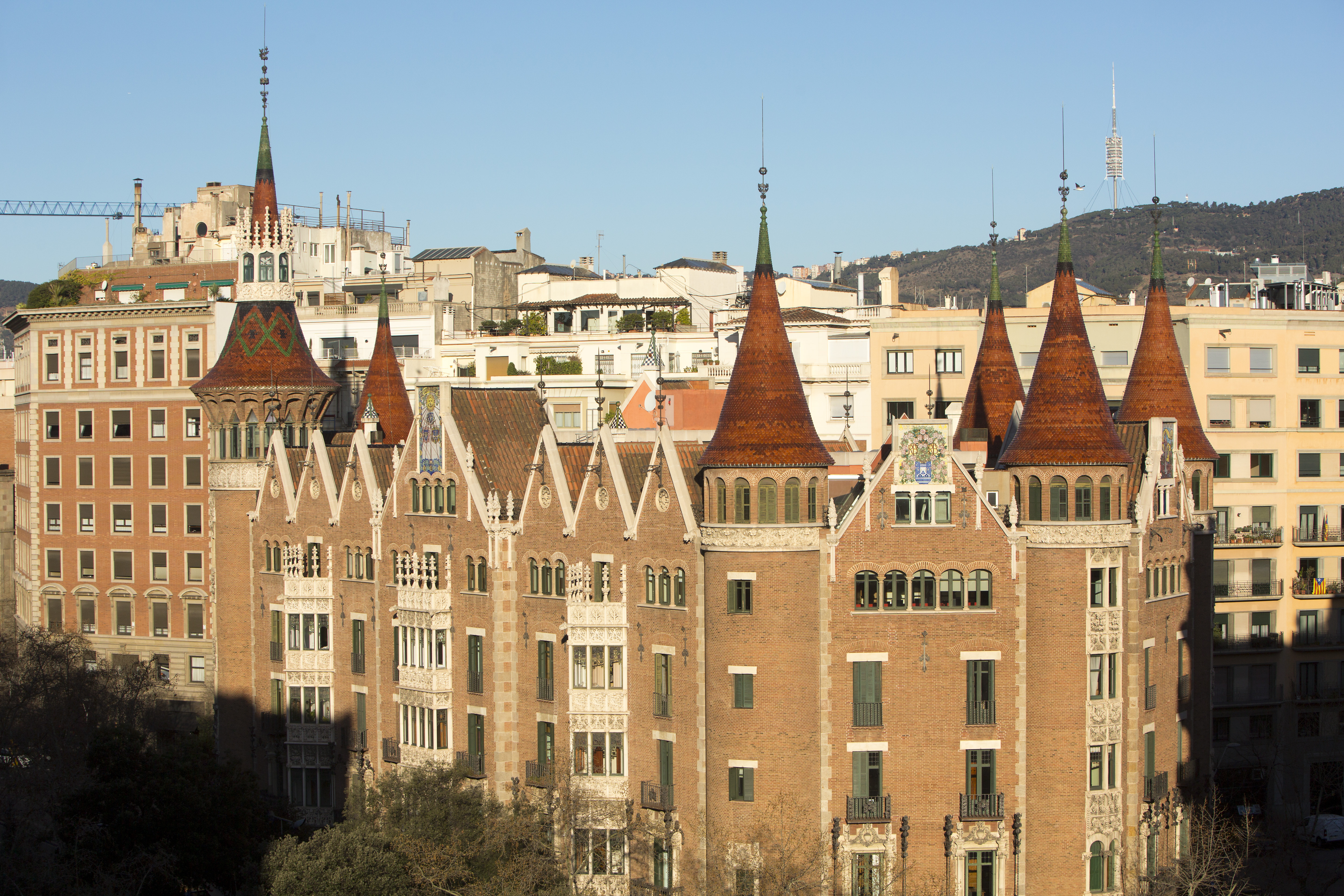
Casa de les Punxes façade

For example, on the façade of the corner of Carrer Rosselló with Avinguda Diagonal, which belongs to number 420 in Diagonal street, there is an interesting sculptural panel of Enric Monserdà––work in which an angel is depicted, figure that clearly refers to the owner of this building, the sister Àngela Terradas. The preparatory drawing by Monserdà is in the archives of the Royal Catalan Academy of Fine Arts of Sant Jordi in Barcelona. In the phylactery deploying the angel, one reads in Gothic letters: «This work was completed in MCMV».

Other decorative details that reminds us of this property, found in anagrams, distributed as if they were a frieze, around the base of the main tower of the house. In the anagram ATB letters are repeated, referring to Àngela Terradas Brutau.

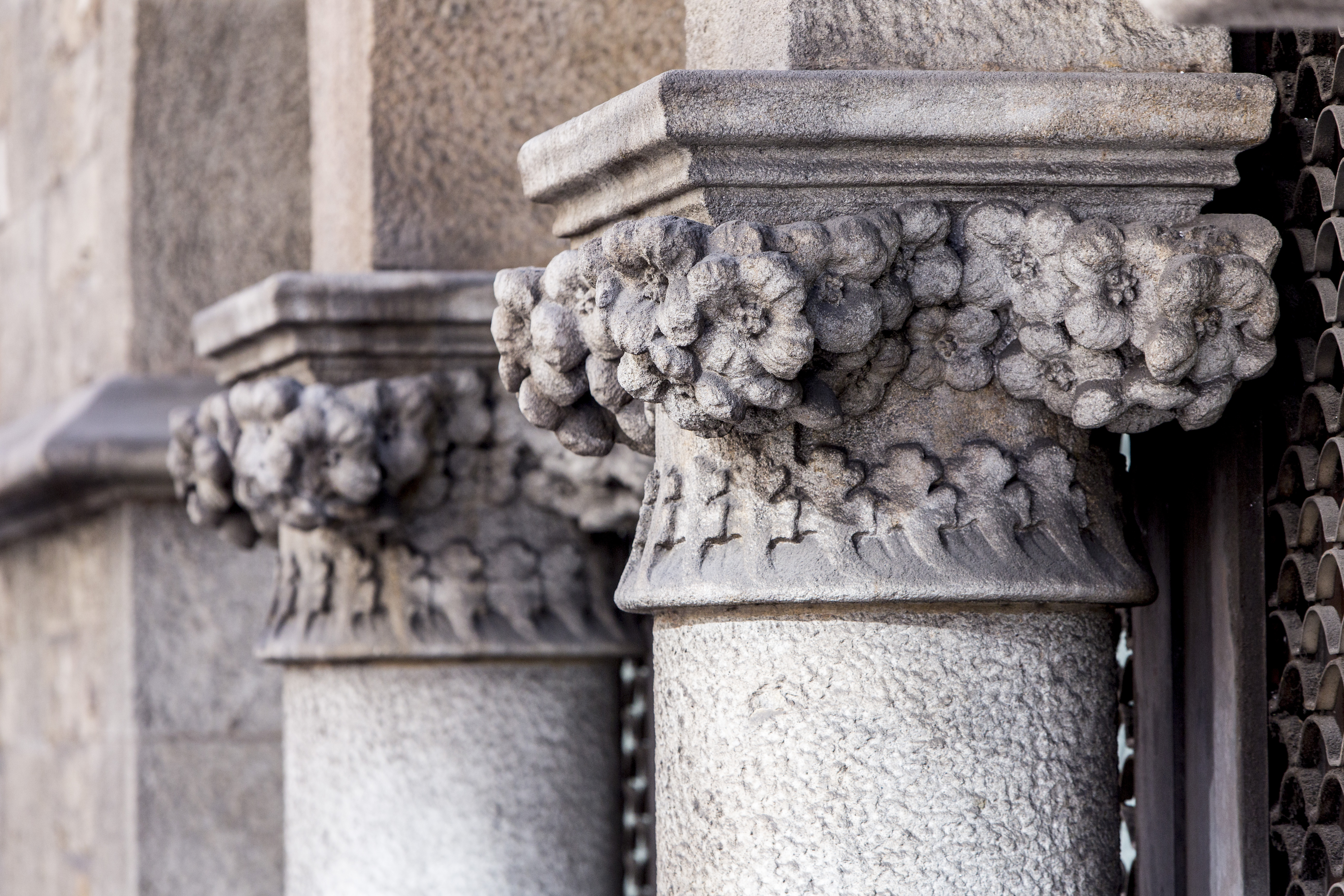
Floral decoration

Although the floral decoration is a recurring element in this house, the choice of the clover is emphasized both in some of the stone reliefs that decorate the façade as well as in the drawings of stained glass leaded balconies. At number 418 of Avinguda Diagonal, there is a ceramic panel —work from Monserdà also— in which there is a representation, simultaneously, of a sundial and a calendar. Moreover, in the representations of the Roman Numerals the four signs of the zodiac associated with the four seasons are added: Capricorn (winter), with horns that symbolize the hunt; Aries (spring), surrounded by flowers; Libra (autumn), with grapes, and Cancer (summer), in the water. In a phylactery on top of the clock, we read: «Numquam te crastina fallet hora», a phrase taken from the «Libro I» of The Georgics, by Virgilio, which means, ‘tomorrow will never fail you’.

This property belonged to Josefa Terradas, that of who we find references in decorative artificial stone pinnacles, where a florid rod is represented, with a Gothic letter engraved in stone. Josefa's property went from Avinguda Diagonal to Carrer Rosselló, in whose rear façade we find another ceramic panel drawn by the same Monserdà, where it represents Sant Jordi slaying the dragon and reads: «Patron Saint of Catalonia give us back our freedom».

Just under this panel, in a strategic position due to the meaning that the figure of Sant Jordi represented, we encounter a sculpted face that results familiar. The male figure, with round glasses, important hair entries and pouty lips, represents the great author of the project, the architect Josep Puig i Cadafalch.

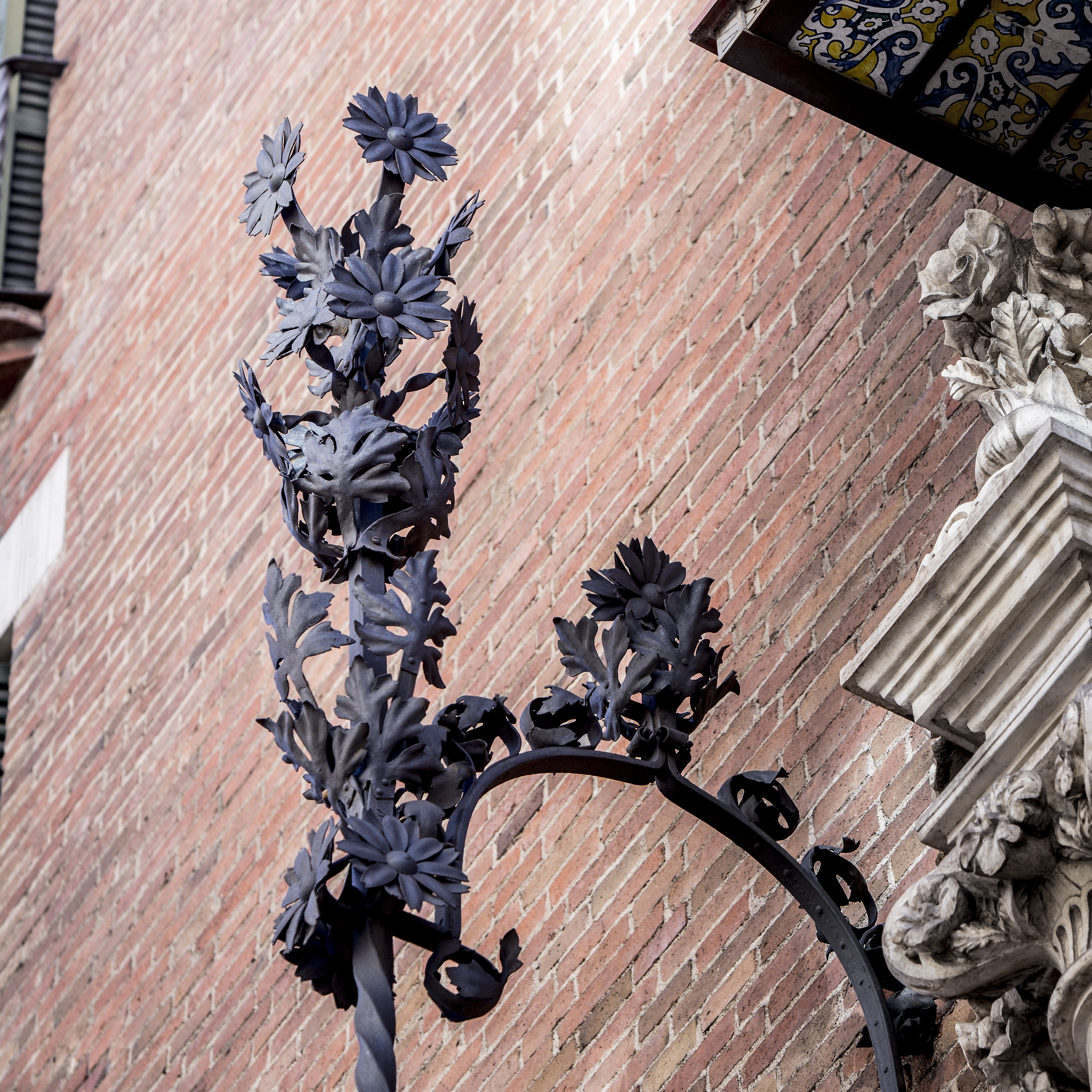
Forge detail

In the facades of Avinguda Diagonal and Carrer Bruc, there are two additional ceramic panels. In one there is a vase full of roses, with RTB initials, on the other, the figure of a girl surrounded by roses. This property belonged to the sister Rosa Terradas Brutau.

== Casa Terradas symbolism ==
In all the symbolic elements of Casa Terradas we find other representations, both in sculptures, forge or glass work, which can conduct a symbolic reading, whether it is religious or mythological. Throughout the various façades comprising the house, male figures are represented, some with horns; others, with a more particular physiognomy, and sailor's knots. Vegetables are the most recurrent elements: fruits, like apples or pomegranates, as well as daisies, roses or clovers.

=== Innovative use of steel structures ===
Puig i Cadafalch decided to break with the building tradition that dominated so far. He opted to eliminate the traditional load-bearing walls being replaced by cast iron pillars and metal beams on the ground floor, which provided an airy feel to the space (these premises were for commercial rental) and a total open plan distribution, detached from the strong constraint posed by load-bearing walls.

=== La Casa Terradas after the Terradas Brutau family ===
Since the three owners of the house Terradas died childless, the building was taken over by their brother and sole heir, Bartomeu Terradas Brutau.

In 1976, the building was declared a National Historic Monument (later to become known as a Cultural Asset of National Interest).

In 1991, when La Caixa enters as shareholder of Colonial, the building becomes part of the real estate portfolio and an integral restoration project of the building is conducted, both interior and exterior. Over the years they continued this work until architects Francesc Xavier Asarta and Albert Pla took over the restoration, works which lasted until 2003. The construction works were carried out during 2004 and were recognized by the Urban Land Institute Europe Excellence Award as one of the top five European heritage interventions.

Currently, the house is privately owned and can be visited from July 2016 onwards.

== Craftsmen of la Casa Terradas ==
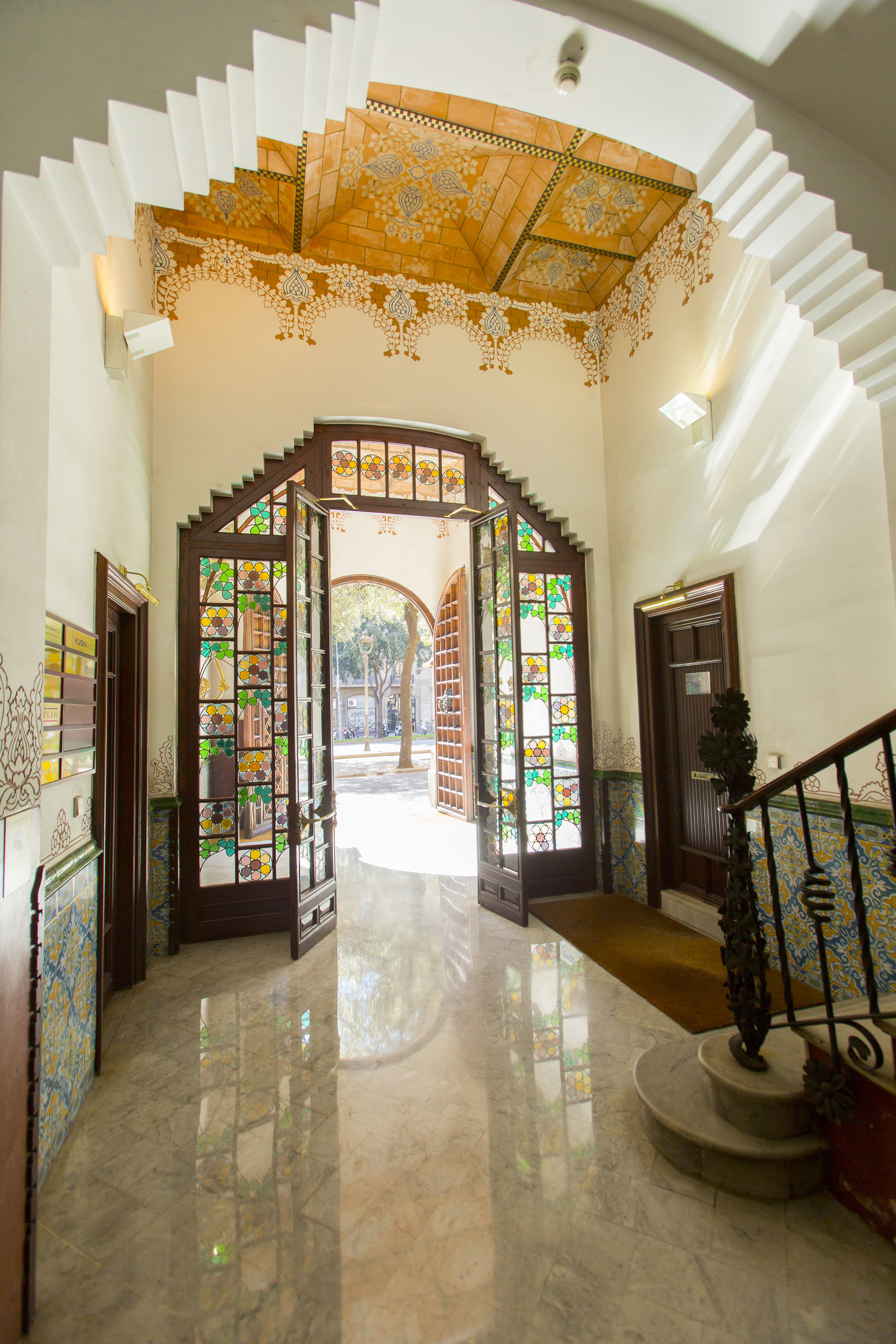
Stained glass interior

=== Enrique Monserdà (1850–1926) ===
The intervention of Enric Monserdà in Casa Terradas of Barcelona was very important. We can say that, together with Josep Puig i Cadafalch, Monserdà was the great ideologue of the house. On the completion of the construction works of the first of three houses, Monserdà set up his studio-workshop in one of the round ends of la Casa Terradas on the corner of Avinguda Diagonal with Carrer Rosselló

Thus, his designs are the decorative elements of artificial stone that fill the façade, the ceramic panels of Sant Jordi, the Angel and the roses, and the design of the windows and elements of artificial iron. Monserdà was also the designer of much of the furniture made for the floors of the Terradas family as well as the neo-Gothic chapel of the house, with its beautiful altarpiece.

=== Alfons Juyol i Bach (Barcelona 1860–1917) ===
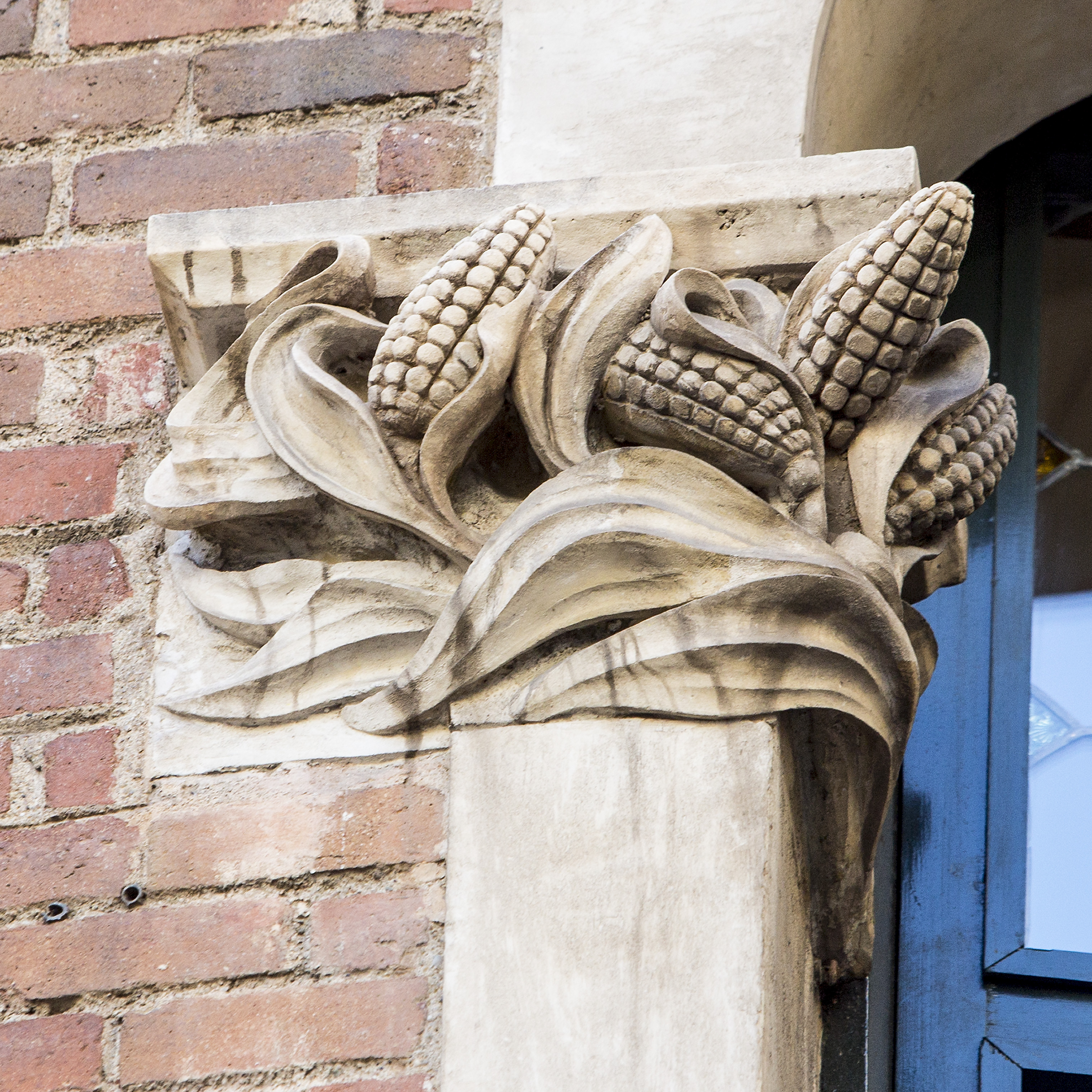
Stone craft detail

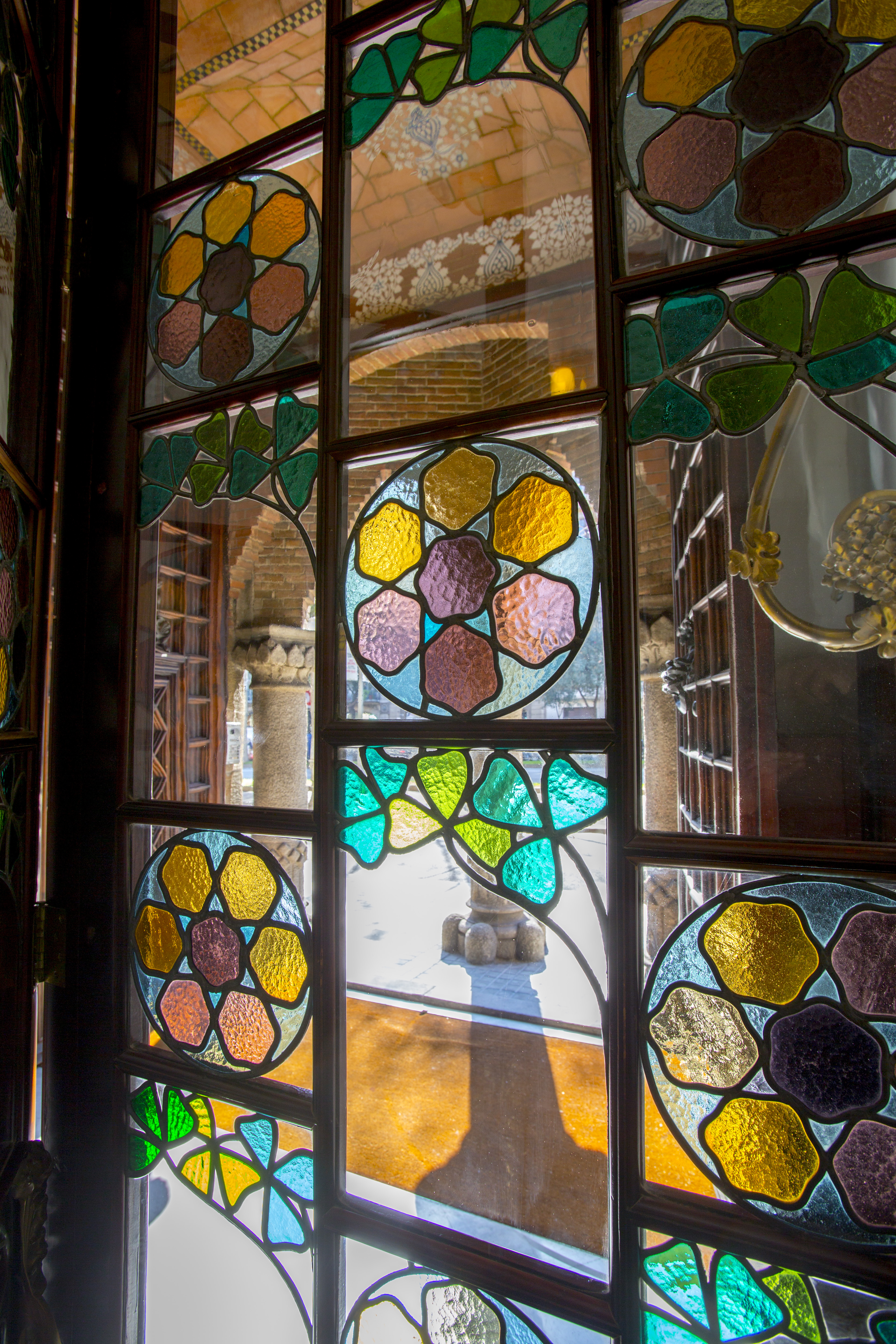
Stained glass detail

Alfons Juyol i Bach was a Catalan sculptor specialized in the decoration of architectonic elements. He studied at la Llotja, where he was awarded a prize in drawing. When he finished his education, in late April 1900 together with his brother Josep he opened a workshop of stone cutting and sculpture on the street of Muntaner, 31, Barcelona, called Hermanos Juyol that would soon acquire a deserved prestige. He was a versatile artist who collaborated with architects, sculptors, smelters, blacksmiths and carpenters. He was a perfectionist, which led him to review the wax models before sending them to the foundry, or to make mockups of the decorations for the façades of the buildings he was commissioned.

=== Amigó workshop ===
The most important stained glass shop in Barcelona was Amigó y Cia, located in the Tapineria of Barcelona. Ramon Eudald Amigó i Dou (Barcelona, 1818–1885), a glass painter, was a great glazier artist and performed very important work. For example, he collaborated with the architect Joan Martorell in the restoration of the Gothic windows of the church in Santa María del Mar and the University of Barcelona, amongst many others.

At Casa Terradas there are several examples of glass works: Emphasizing the stained glass windows of the entrance doors of each of the three-story buildings, with vegetable motif of leaves and flowers, executed with textured glass and in various colour shades. In addition, the function of filtering light was intended to establish a line of continuity with the exterior environment and it was finally incorporated.

=== Manuel Ballarín i Lancuentra (Aragón, 1863 – Biescas, Huesca, 1915) ===
Manuel Ballarín i Lancuentra was one of the main forge artists who worked during the modernist period. He collaborated with the main Catalan architects of the time.

In 1900, Casa Ballarín modernized and popularized the forging sector and incorporated mechanized production of serial parts, which were presented in a catalogue and greatly reduced the selling price.

== Rehabilitation of 2016 ==
The architect Jaume Falguera, in charge of this task, seeks to enhance the work of Josep Puig i Cadafalch. The aim of this rehabilitation process is to recover the essence of the Modernista building and the figure of Puig i Cadafalch. On the ground floor, after eliminating the dividing walls and ceilings, the resulting open space revalues the original columns that the architect introduced to replace the bearing walls, one of the most important contributions of the time.

=== Three floors ===
The rehabilitation works being carried out in the building 420, located in the corner between Avinguda Diagonal and Carrer Rosselló, are being conducted on the ground floor, the main floor and the roof. One of the main changes will be the addition of a lift that will communicate these three floors.

Refurbishments are also being conducted on the ground floor to recover the essence and the main features of the original building designed by Puig i Cadafalch. Thereby eliminating the false ceiling and the different walls that had been added in the latest reforms, where there is the will to reclaim the space as an open plan area. Therefore, the columns placed by the original architect, which was the most important innovation of the time, will regain prominence.

At this time, the entire base structure endured traditional load-bearing walls, but Puig i Cadafalch replaced them with different columns. With these rehabilitation works, Falguera will leave a maze of columns on the ground floor that opens up to the plaza in front. Furthermore, when removing the false ceiling you may again see the different details and ornaments that Puig i Cadafalch placed in different arches that formed the roof, which so far remained hidden. This is Casa de les Punxes main facade on the ground floor, since Puig i Cadafalch conceived it this way because it is where the two longest building facades end. Likewise, this is the best view of the building from the intersection of Passeig de Gracia and Avinguda Diagonal. From the ground floor, stairs are built that (next to the new elevator) take you directly to the main floor, which is also being rehabilitated. Space is being recovered on this floor also as conceived by Puig i Cadafalch, and emphasizing the triangular balconies and the various rooms. The main floors of the three buildings were intended as housing for each of the owners. One of the innovations being implemented by Falguera is the communication between different rooms, so that a connection between them is created.

Various Spanish and multinational companies, including Cloudworks and Roman, have set up operations at its facilities. Roman, the Spanish communications and public affairs consultancy, has established its headquarters on the two main floors.

=== The rooftop ===
The building is crowned by the roof of the house, where there are six towers that grant the popular name of Casa de les Punxes.

The roof is an open space plan with an area of over 600 m2, on the laterals the previously mentioned ancient bunkers and towers are located. The largest tower, occupying the corner of Avinguda Diagonal with Carrer Rosselló, contains three levels and offers a privileged view of the city.

It is also in this tower where one of the great technological advances in the world of architecture is captured, a constructive revolution, in which the architect takes to the extreme the structural advances: the floors no longer rest on vertical support elements, but by hanging steel straps operating tensile loads and transmit the weight of the ceramic circular perimeter walls, making them work in compression. This structure, despite being in a confined space is accessible, an important fact to understand their constructive complexity.

== See also ==
- List of Modernisme buildings in Barcelona

== Bibliographic references ==
- García Espuche, Albert, El quadrat d'or, centre de la Barcelona modernista, Fundació Caixa de Catalunya, 1990, ISBN 84-404-6934-9
- Alcolea Gil, Santiago. Catalunya-Europa. L’art català dins Europa. Barcelona: editorial Pòrtic, 2003.
- Artigas Coll, Isabel. El Modernisme. Modernismo en Barcelona. Ed. Frechmann Kolón GMBH, 2011
- Bassegoda, Joan; Pladevall, Antoni; Puyol, Carme. L’arquitecte Puig i Cadafalch a Osona: el Casal de Sobrevia, 100 anys. Tarragona: Ll.T.S., 2001
- Elias, Feliu. Enric Monserdà. La seva vida i la seva obra. Barcelona: Imp. Tallers Gràfics de la Casa Provincial de la Caritat, 1927.
- Jardí, Enric. Puig i Cadafalch. Arquitecte, polític i historiador de l’art. Barcelona: Editorial Ariel, 1975.
- Mackay, David. L’arquitectura moderna a Barcelona (1854–1939). Barcelona: Edicions

62, 1989.

- Puig i Cadafalch, Josep. Memòries. Barcelona: Publicacions de l’Abadia de Montserrat, 2003.
- Roher, Judith; Solà-Morales, Ignasi de (coords.): J. Puig i Cadafalch: l’arquitectura entre la casa i la ciutat. Barcelona: Fundació Caixa de Pensions i Col·legi d’Arquitectes de Catalunya, 1989.

== Lectures ==
- Cañellas, Silvia; Gil, Núria. «El taller Amigó: de la tradició al progrés. El camí cap al vitrall modernista». Congrés Internacional de Modernisme. Barcelona, junio de 2013.

== Periodical publications ==
- Amenós, Lluïsa. «Les arts del ferro al servei de l’arquitectura modernista». Butlletí XXV. Barcelona 2011. Reial Acadèmia Catalana de les Belles Arts de Sant Jordi, 2011.
- Artigas Coll, Isabel, «La Casa Terradas, la Casa de les Punxes». octubre del 2014.
- Panyella, Joan. «Arquitectes, artistes dibuixants de ferros. Don Josep Puig

i Cadafalch». De l’art de la forja, noviembre de 1918, núm. 6, pp. 81–83.

- Permanyer, Lluís; «Alfons Juyol. Creador de una estirpe». La Vanguardia, 15 de febrero de 1998.
- Ràfols, J.F. «Puig i Cadafalch». Quaderns d’arquitectura i urbanisme, mayo de 1981.
- Romaní, Daniel. «Rellotges a la vista». Barcelona, metròpolis mediterrània, otoño de 2005, núm. 66, pp. 86–92.
