= Români (river) =

- Location within Romania

Location
- Country: Romania
- Counties: Neamț, Bacău
- Villages: Făurei, Goșmani, Români, Buhuși

Physical characteristics
- Mouth: Bistrița
  - coordinates: 46.7049°N 26.6939°E
- Length: 26 km (16 mi)
- Basin size: 116 km^{2} (45 sq mi)

Basin features
- Progression: Bistrița→ Siret→ Danube→ Black Sea
- Tributaries
  - left: Dornești
  - right: Lipoveni

The Români is a left tributary of the river Bistrița in Romania. It discharges into the Bistrița near Buhuși. Its length is 26 km (16 mi) and its basin size is 116 km^{2} (45 sq mi).
