= Romans =

Romans most commonly refers to the ancient Roman people, the inhabitants of ancient Rome.

It may also refer to:

== People ==
- the citizens of Rome, capital of Italy
- East Romans (Ῥωμαῖοι; Rhomaioi, lit. "Romans" in Greek), the predominantly Greek-speaking people of the Byzantine empire
- Rum millet, the Eastern Orthodox Christian people of the Ottoman empire
  - Romioi

== Arts ==
- Romans (band), a Japanese pop group
- Romans (2013 film), an Indian Malayalam comedy film
- Romans (2017 film), a British drama film
- The Romans (Doctor Who), a serial in British TV series

== Places ==
- Romans, Ain, France
- Romans, Deux-Sèvres, France
- Romans d'Isonzo, Italy
- Romans-sur-Isère, France

== Other ==
- Epistle to the Romans, a book of the New Testament
- Ar-Rum (lit. 'The Romans'), the 30th chapter of the Quran in Islam
- Rum (name)

== See also ==
- Roman (disambiguation)
