= Alexander Romanovsky (ice hockey) =

Russian ice hockey player

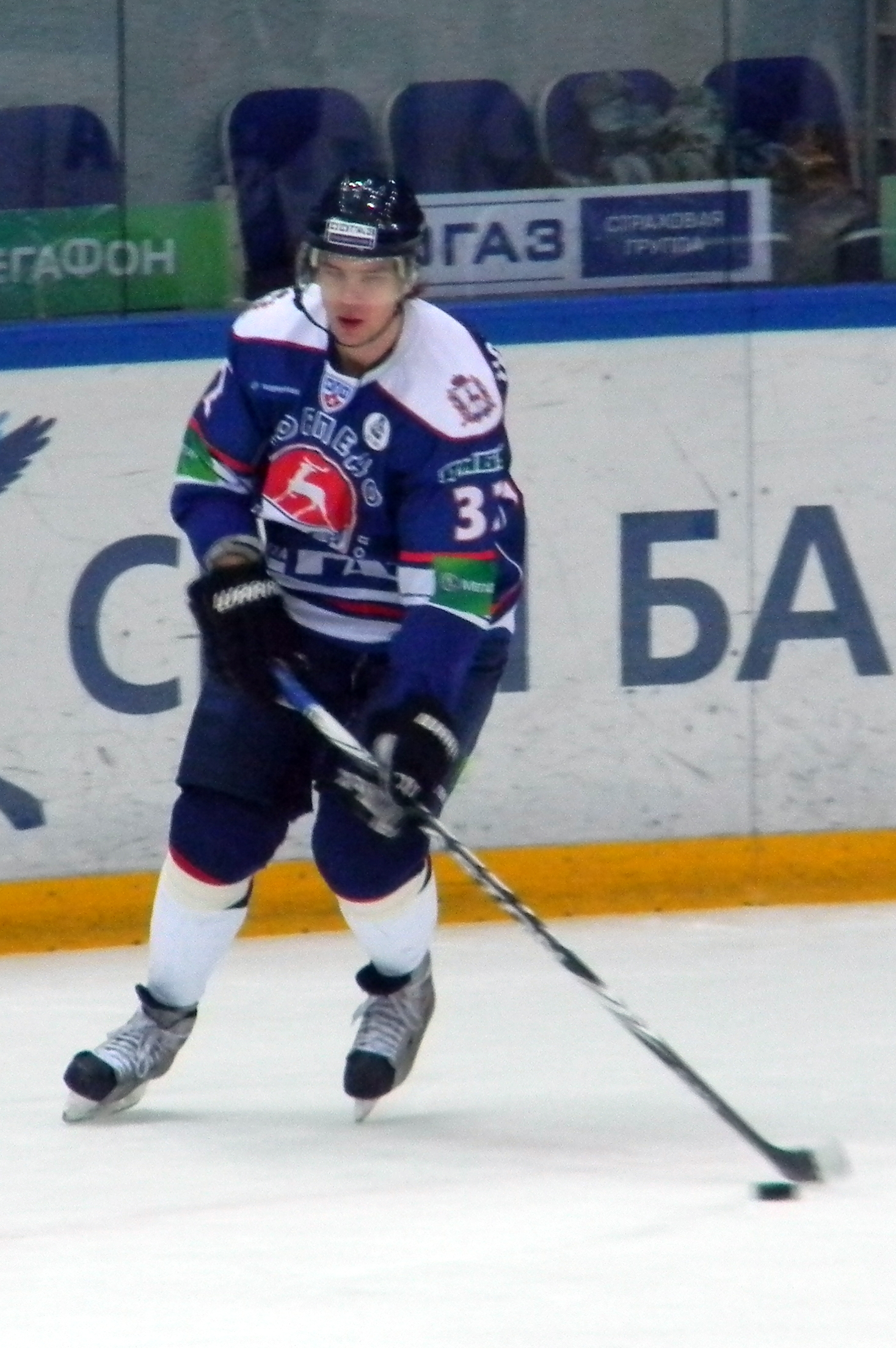
- Alexander Romanovsky 2012-02-06
- Born: 8 June 1987 (age 39) Moscow, Russia
- Height: 6 ft 2 in (188 cm)
- Weight: 209 lb (95 kg; 14 st 13 lb)
- Position: Right wing
- Shoots: Left
- KHL team: HC Spartak Moscow
- NHL draft: Undrafted
- Playing career: 2005–present

Alexander Romanovsky (born 8 June 1987) is a Russian ice hockey player. He is currently playing with HC Spartak Moscow of the Kontinental Hockey League (|KHL).

Romanovsky made his Kontinental Hockey League (KHL) debut playing with Khimik Voskresensk during the 2008–09 KHL season.
