= Wiesław Romanowski =

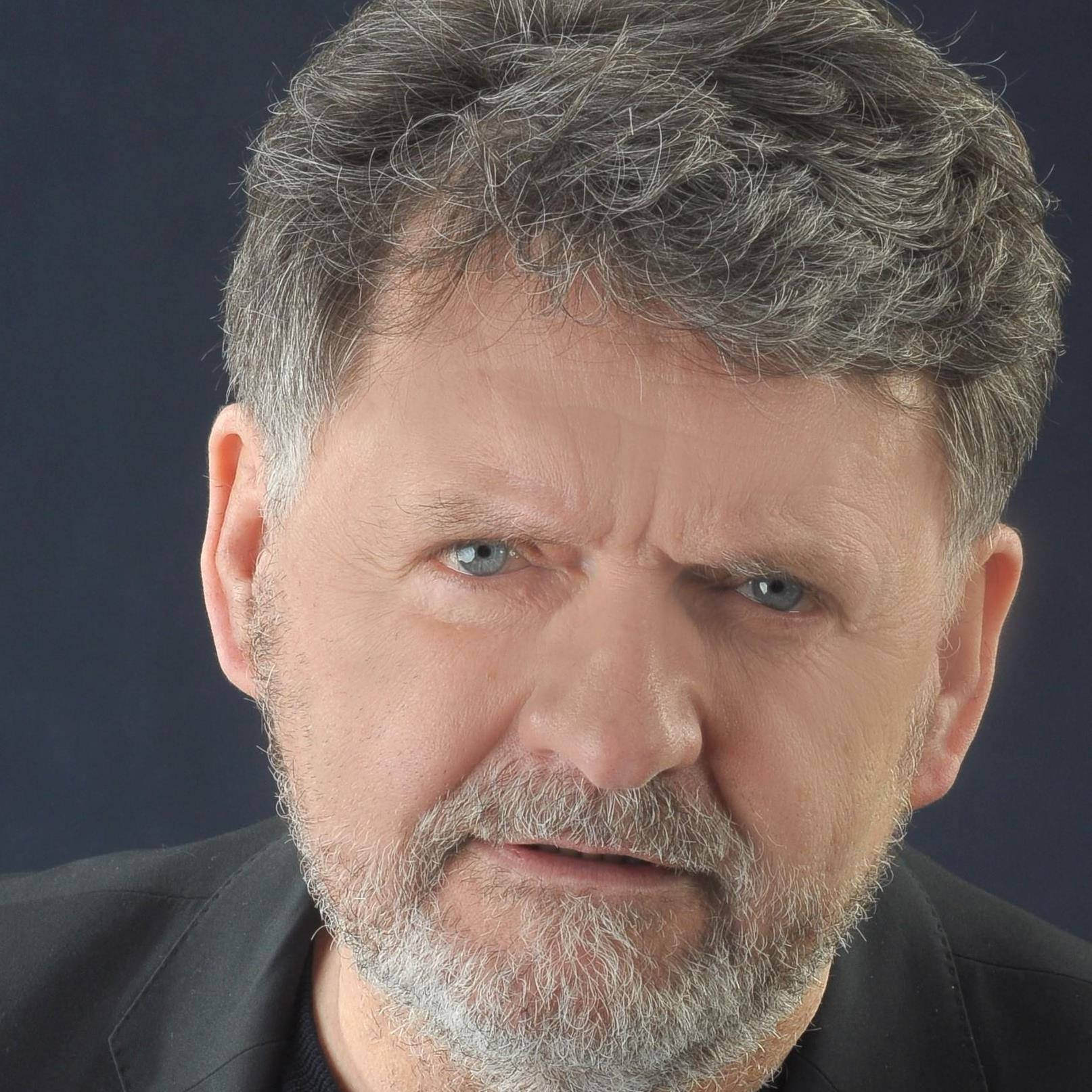
Wiesław Romanowski

Wiesław Romanowski (born August 18, 1952) is a Polish journalist and publicist, opposition activist in Communist Poland, and diplomat.

During the Martial law in Poland he was interned (1981-1982) for his oppositional activities.

1998-2005, reporter of Polish TV in Ukraine.

== Filmography ==
Romanowski is a screenwriter, director, and producer of over 10 documentary films.

- 1995 – Moskwa jak las (together with Andrzej Drawicz)
- 1995 – Sprawa polityczna
- 1996 – Dwie historie
- 1997 – Pudełka Stalina (Stalin's Boxes; a documentary about the visit to the archives of the FSB, where he was allowed to see the boxes with the cases of Poles repressed in the Soviet Union during Stalin's times
- 1998 – Znak pokoju
- 2002 – Nie chcę tego oglądać
- 2005 – Dom na wzgórzu
- 2005 – Przystanek wolność ("Station Liberty"), about the Orange Revolution
- 2008 – Feliks znaczy szczęśliwy ("Felix Means Happy"), about Felix Dzerzhinski

== Books ==
- Ukraina. Przystanek Wolność ("Ukraine. Station Liberty"), Wydawnictwo Literackie 2006, ISBN 978-83-08-03969-4
- Bandera. Terorysta Z Galicji ("Bandera. A Terrorist from Galicia"), Wydawnictwo Demart 2012, ISBN 978-83-7427-888-1
