= Roman language =

Roman language may refer to:

- Latin, the language of Ancient Rome
- Romaic, the language of the Byzantine Empire
- Languages of the Roman Empire
- Romance languages, the languages descended from Latin, including French, Spanish and Italian
- Romanesco dialect, the variety of Italian spoken in the area of Rome

== See also ==
- Romang language, a language of Indonesia
- Romani language, the language of the Romani people
- Romanian language, the language of Romania
- Romansh language, an official language of Switzerland
