= Roman (consulting firm) =

- Founded: 1989; 37 years ago
- Founder: Santiago Román
- Headquarters: Barcelona, Spain
- Number of locations: 3, including Barcelona, Madrid, and London
- Key people: Silvia Alsina (CEO)
- Products: Corporate communications, finance, digital, lifestyle and public affairs
- Revenue: 22,7 M € (2024)
- Website: romanrm.com/en/

Roman (formerly Román y Asociados) is a Spanish communications and public relations consultancy founded in 1989. With an international presence and offices in Barcelona, Madrid and London, it specialises in building and protecting corporate reputation.

== History ==
Roman was founded in Barcelona in 1989 under the name of Román y Asociados, on the initiative of Santiago Román, who remained at the helm until 2012. Initially, the consultancy focused on press office services and media relations, in line with corporate communications at the time.

With market growth and the rise of the Internet, the company expanded its geographical presence and service areas, opening an office in Madrid in the 1990s and in Valencia in 2004. During this period, the company began to diversify its activities, including communications for the technology and telecommunications sectors.

After the management team acquired ownership in 2012, Silvia Alsina, then CEO, took over as Executive Chairman and in 2022 gave two of her business directors a shareholding.

In 2019, the company underwent a rebranding and identity change. The company rebranded from ‘Roman & Associates’ to ‘Roman’ and the English slogan 'reputation matters´ was incorporated as part of the identity. From 2020, the company made several strategic acquisitions to expand its capabilities. In 2022 it acquired the creative studio La Casa de Carlota, and in 2024 Villafañe & Asociados Consultores (VA&C), which specialises in measuring and managing corporate reputation.

== Organisation and management ==
Roman has offices in Madrid, London, and Barcelona. Its headquarters are located in Casa de les Punxes (also known as Casa Terrades), a modernist building declared a Historic-Artistic Monument. The company also has partners in the rest of Europe, the United States and Latin America for the development of international projects.

Santiago Román was the founder and president until 2012. Since then, Silvia Alsina has been president and CEO. She shares ownership of Roman with a group of Managing Partners who form the Executive Committee of the consultancy, whose ownership model is a business partnership. The steering committee includes business development, operations and corporate heads, as well as experts in corporate communications, finance, digital, lifestyle and public affairs. The multidisciplinary team oversees a staff of more than 200 consultants at Roman.

== Recognition ==
The consultancy has received various awards and recognition. In 2018, it received the FEIEA Grand Prix 2018 for the Compliance Café campaign for Gas Natural Fenosa. In 2019, it obtained BCorp certification, and was recognised as Consultant of the Year by PrScope.

For two consecutive years, it won the Dircom Ramón del Corral Award for Internal Communications, for the 1,000 Ways to Prevent campaign for Leroy Merlin (2022), and the + Diverse + Inclusive + Capable campaign for Acciona (2023). In 2023, with La Casa de Carlota, it won the Impactte Award for the Best By Principle campaign for the Red Cross, and was named Best Communications and Content Agency at the Control 2023 Awards. In 2024 the PrScope study named it "Number One Agency for Commitment to Sustainability". In 2025, it leads the ranking of consulting firms compiled by Mergermarket for M&A communication advisory in Spain, both in deal value and number of transactions.
