= Români, Neamț =

Români
- Commune
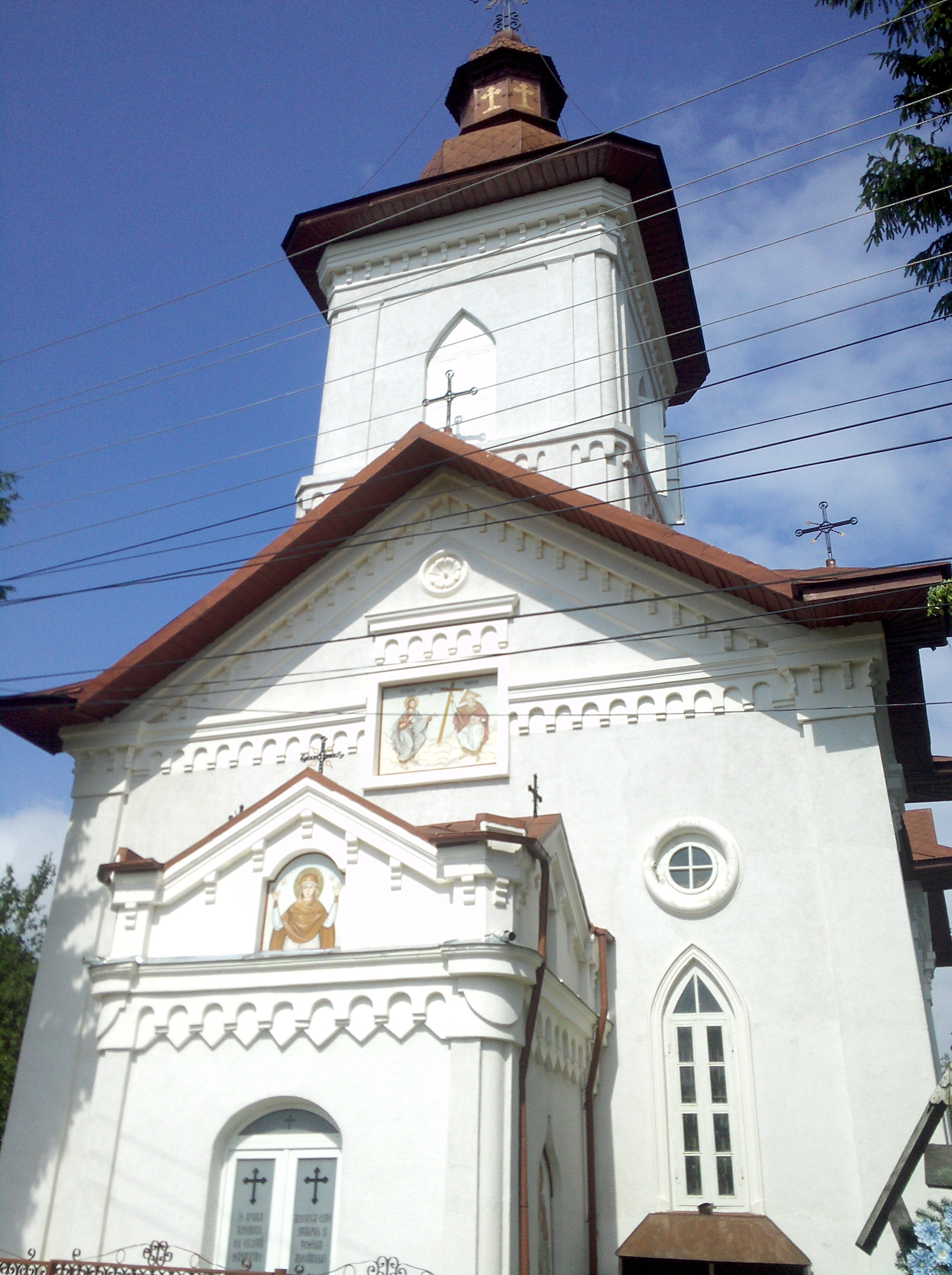
- Orthodox Church in Siliștea

- Location in Neamț County

- Location in Romania
- Coordinates: 46°48′N 26°41′E
- Country: Romania
- County: Neamț
- Subdivisions: Români, Goșmani, Siliștea

Government
  - Mayor (2024–2028): Maria Poenaru (PNL)
- Area: 54 km^{2} (21 sq mi)
- Elevation: 321 m (1,053 ft)
- Population (2021-12-01): 3,616
  - Density: 67/km^{2} (170/sq mi)
- Time zone: UTC+02:00 (EET)
  - Summer (DST): UTC+03:00 (EEST)
- Postal code: 617385
- Area code: +40 x33
- Vehicle reg.: NT
- Website: comunaromani.ro

Români is a commune in Neamț County, Western Moldavia, Romania. It is composed of three villages: Goșmani, Români, and Siliștea.

Historical population
Year	Pop.	±%
1992	4,750	—
2002	4,666	−1.8%
2011	3,939	−15.6%
2021	3,616	−8.2%
Source: Census data
