= Alexander Romanovsky (chess player) =

Lithuanian-Russian chess player

Alexander Arsenievich Romanovsky (12 June 1880 – 1943) was a Lithuanian-Russian chess master. He was born in Kaunas, Lithuania (then Russian Empire). He was the elder brother of Peter Romanovsky.

At the beginning of the 20th century, he played in several local tournaments in Sankt Petersburg. He tied for 6–7th in 1905/06 (the 4th All-Russian Masters' Tournament, Gersz Salwe won), took 4th in 1907 (Sergey von Freymann won), took 3rd in 1908 (Quadrangular, S. Lebedev won), took 3rd in 1909 (Grigory Levenfish won), and took 11th in 1911 (All-Russian Amateur Tournament, Stepan Levitsky won).
