= Romanowo =

Romanowo may refer to any of the following places in Poland:

- Romanowo, Lower Silesian Voivodeship (south-west Poland)
- Romanowo, Aleksandrów County in Kuyavian-Pomeranian Voivodeship (north-central Poland)
- Romanowo, Bydgoszcz County in Kuyavian-Pomeranian Voivodeship (north-central Poland)
- Romanowo, Podlaskie Voivodeship (north-east Poland)
- Romanowo, Ciechanów County in Masovian Voivodeship (east-central Poland)
- Romanowo, Maków County in Masovian Voivodeship (east-central Poland)
- Romanowo, Gmina Sompolno in Greater Poland Voivodeship (west-central Poland)
- Romanowo, Gmina Wierzbinek in Greater Poland Voivodeship (west-central Poland)
- Romanowo, Gmina Środa Wielkopolska, Środa County in Greater Poland Voivodeship (west-central Poland)
- Romanowo, Elbląg County in Warmian-Masurian Voivodeship (north Poland)
- Romanowo, Ełk County in Warmian-Masurian Voivodeship (north Poland)
