= Romanow =

Romanow or Romanów may refer to:

== People ==
- Roy Romanow, Canadian politician and former premier of Saskatchewan
  - Royal Commission on the Future of Health Care in Canada, chaired by Roy Romanow and commonly known as the Romanow Report
- Michele Romanow, Canadian businessperson

== Geography ==
- Romanów, Greater Poland Voivodeship (west-central Poland)
- Romanów, Łódź East County in Łódź Voivodeship (central Poland)
- Romanów, Sieradz County in Łódź Voivodeship (central Poland)
- Romanów, Lower Silesian Voivodeship (south-west Poland)
- Romanów, Gmina Janów Podlaski in Lublin Voivodeship (east Poland)
- Romanów, Gmina Sosnówka in Lublin Voivodeship (east Poland)
- Romanów, Krasnystaw County in Lublin Voivodeship (east Poland)
- Romanów, Lublin County in Lublin Voivodeship (east Poland)
- Romanów, Białobrzegi County in Masovian Voivodeship (east-central Poland)
- Romanów, Gostynin County in Masovian Voivodeship (central Poland)
- Romanów, Grójec County in Masovian Voivodeship (east-central Poland)
- Romanów, Gmina Jedlińsk in Masovian Voivodeship (east-central Poland)
- Romanów, Gmina Kowala in Masovian Voivodeship (east-central Poland)
- Romanów, Silesian Voivodeship (south Poland)
- Romanów, Świętokrzyskie Voivodeship (south-central Poland)
