= Romany =

Romany relates or may refer to:

- The Romani people or Romany people, also known as Gypsies
- Romani language or Romany language, the language of the Romani people
- "Romany", the pseudonym of a broadcaster and writer of Romani descent, George Bramwell Evens
- Romany (album), an album by The Hollies, released in 1972
- Romany Wisdom, comic book character and sister to X-Men ally Pete Wisdom
- Romany Malco, an American actor
- Romany, the Diva of Magic, professional magician
- Romany, Podlaskie Voivodeship (north-east Poland)
- Romany, Warmian-Masurian Voivodeship (north Poland)
- Ramana, Azerbaijan, near Baku
- Romani and Romany occur as surnames and given names
