= Langya, Zhejiang =

Langya Town
- Town

Chinese transcription(s)
  - Simplified: 琅琊镇
  - Traditional: 瑯琊鎮
  - Pinyin: Lángyá Zhèn
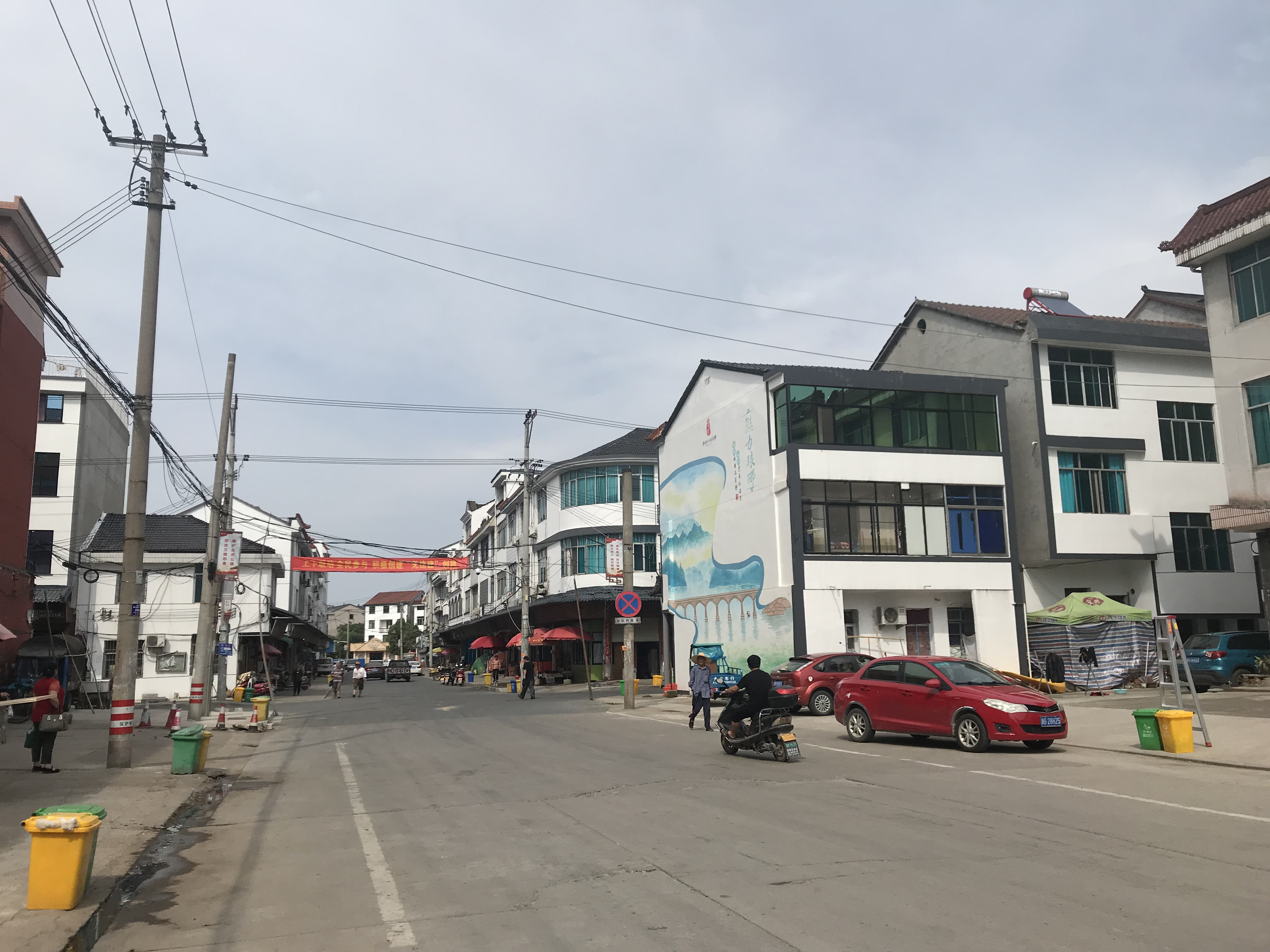
- Main Street of Langya Town.

- Location in Zhejiang
- Coordinates: 29°00′25.56″N 119°29′38.76″E
- Country: China
- Province: Zhejiang
- Prefecture: Jinhua
- China: Wucheng District

Area
  - Total: 98 km^{2} (38 sq mi)

Population (2017)
  - Total: 18,000
  - Density: 180/km^{2} (480/sq mi)
- Time zone: UTC+8 (China Standard)
- Postal code: 321061
- Area code: 0579

Langya (Chinese: 琅琊镇) is a rural town in Wucheng District of Jinhua, eastern China's Zhejiang province. As of the 2017 census it had a population of 18,000 and an area of 98-square-kilometre (38 sq mi). It is surrounded by Jiangtang Town on the north, Tangxi Town on the west, Bailongqiao Town on the east, and Shafan Township on the south.

== History ==
In November 2017, it was inscribed to the 5th National Civilized Villages and Towns List.

== Geography ==
Mount Langfeng (Chinese: 琅峰山) is a mountain in the town.

Jinlan Reservoir is the largest body of water in the town.

The Baisha Stream (Chinese: 白沙溪), a tributary of the Jinhua River, flows through the town.

== Education ==
- Langya School
- Langya Middle School

== Attractions ==
Baisha Ancient Temple (Chinese: 白沙古庙) is a temple and scenic spot in the town.

== Gallery ==
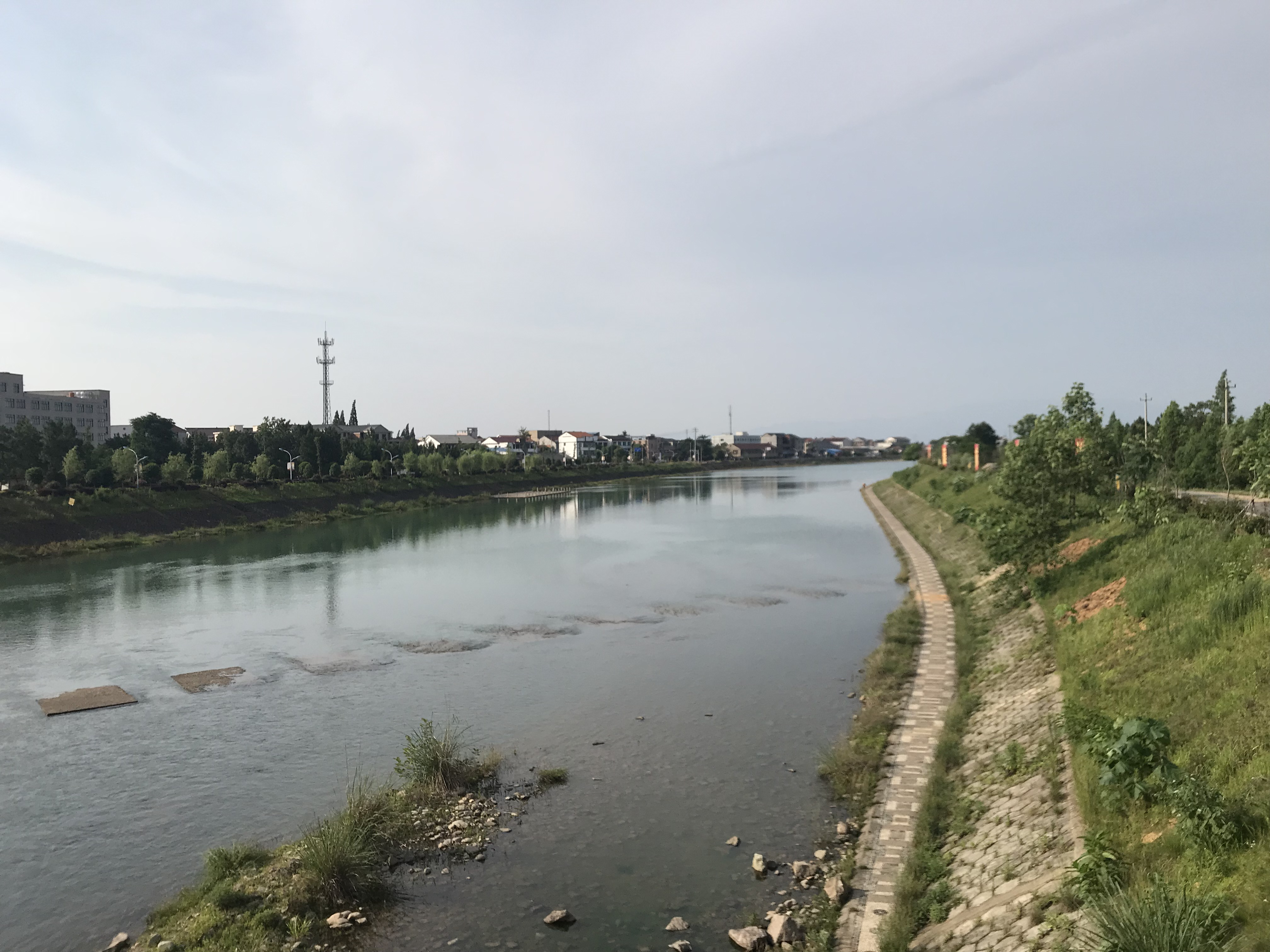
Baisha Stream.

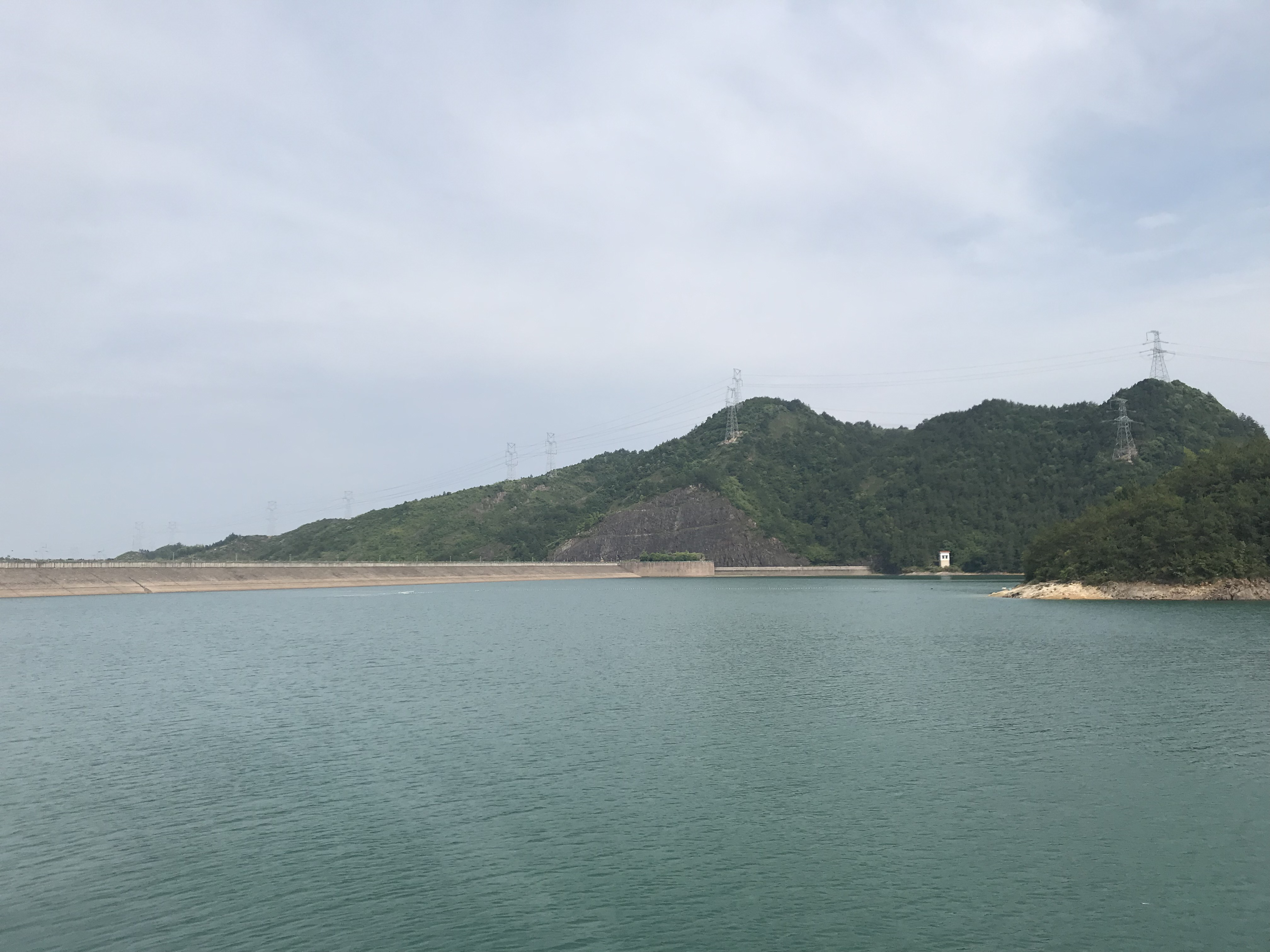
Jinlan Reservoir.

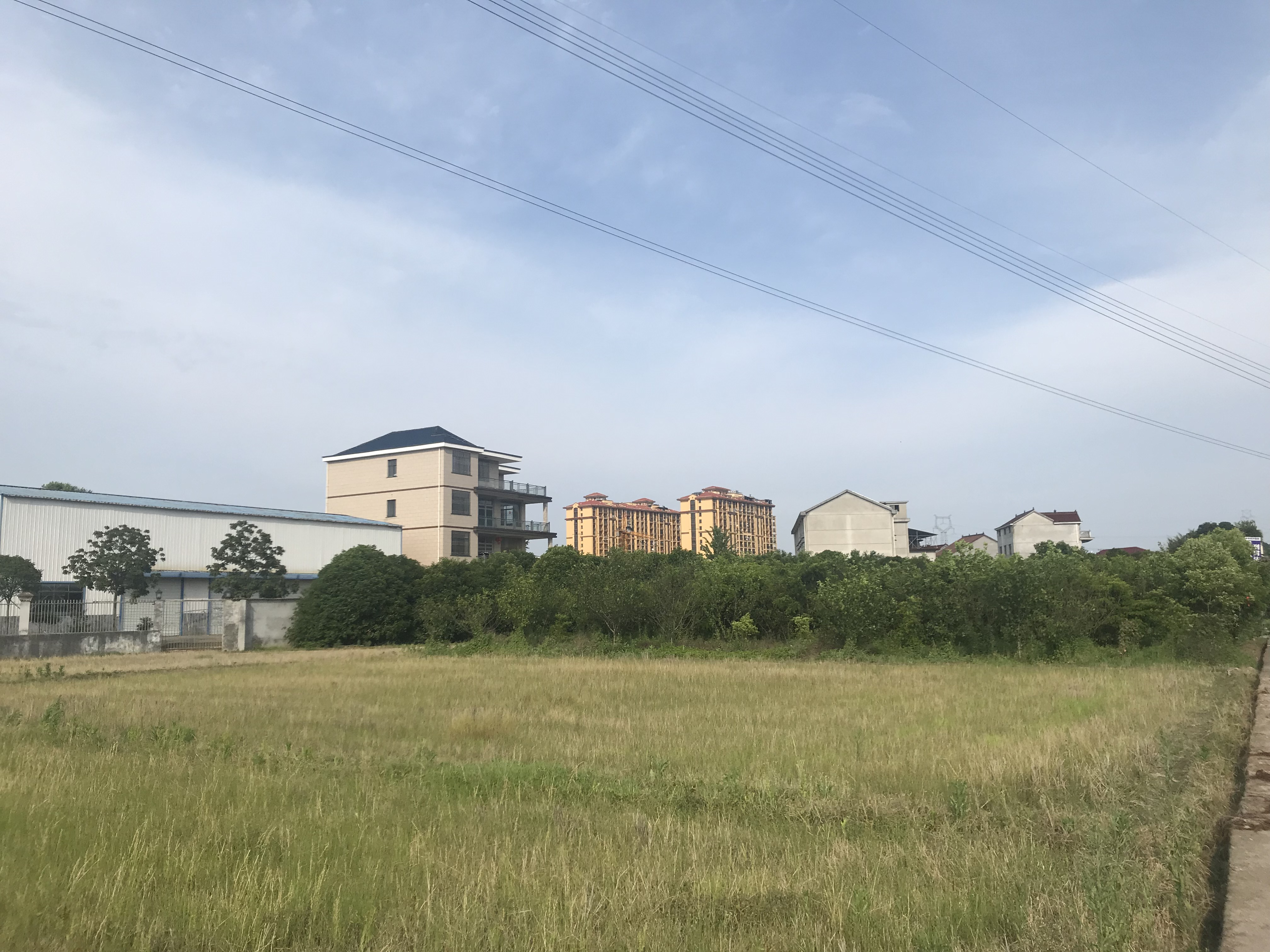
Jiangxipu Village.
