= Yafan =

Yafan Town
- Town

Chinese transcription(s)
  - Simplified: 雅畈镇
  - Traditional: 雅畈鎮
  - Pinyin: Yǎfàn Zhèn
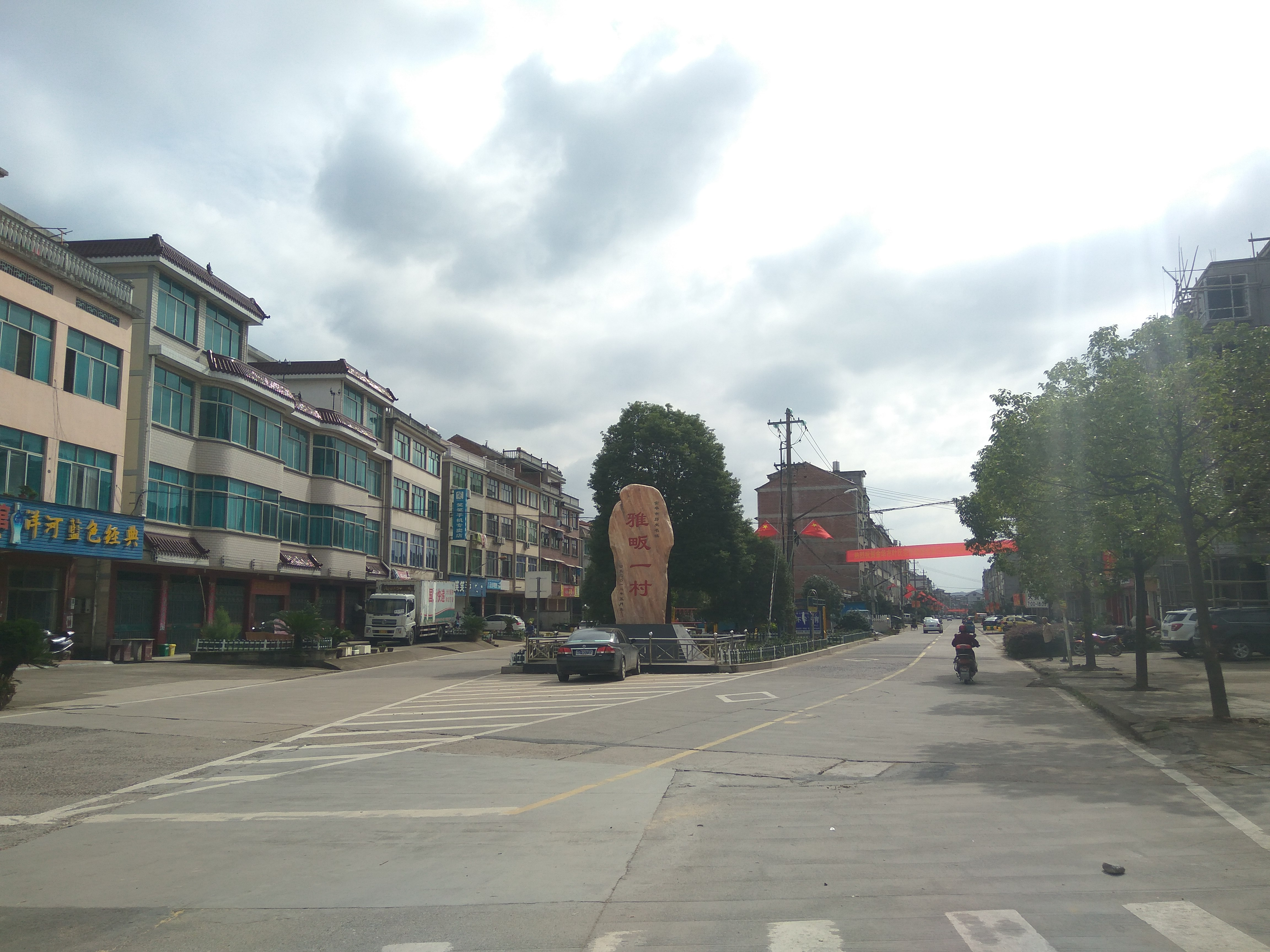
- Entrance of Yafan Town, in 2016.

- Location in Zhejiang
- Coordinates: 29°02′12.48″N 119°40′35.76″E
- Country: China
- Province: Zhejiang
- Prefecture: Jinhua
- District: Wucheng District

Area
  - Total: 75.9 km^{2} (29.3 sq mi)

Population (2017)
  - Total: 22,000
  - Density: 290/km^{2} (750/sq mi)
- Time zone: UTC+8 (China Standard)
- Postal code: 321000
- Area code: 0579

Yafan (Chinese: 雅畈镇) is a rural town in Wucheng District of Jinhua, eastern China's Zhejiang province. It is surrounded by Wuyi River on the northeast, Sumeng Township on the northwest, Andi Town on the southwest, and Wuyi County on the southeast. As of the 2017 census it had a population of 22,000 and an area of 75.9-square-kilometre (29.3 sq mi).

== Geography ==
The Meixi Stream (Chinese: 梅溪江) passes through the western town. The Wuyi River (Chinese: 武义江) flows through the northern town.

Mount Leiniu (Chinese: 磊牛山) is a mountain in the town.

== Economy ==
The local economy is primarily based upon agriculture and local industry. Vegetables are the main cash crops.

== Education ==
- Yafan Middle school

== Transportation ==
The South Second Ring East Road (Chinese: 南二环东路) passes across the town.
