= Shangjing, Zhejiang =

Shangjing 上境村
- Village
- Location in Zhejiang
- Coordinates: 29°01′42″N 119°23′25″E
- Country: People's Republic of China
- Province: Zhejiang
- Prefecture-level city: Jinhua
- District: Wucheng
- Town: Tangxi

Government
  - Chief (2017): Liu Yesheng (刘叶生)
- Time zone: UTC+8 (China Standard)

Shangjing, Zhejiang
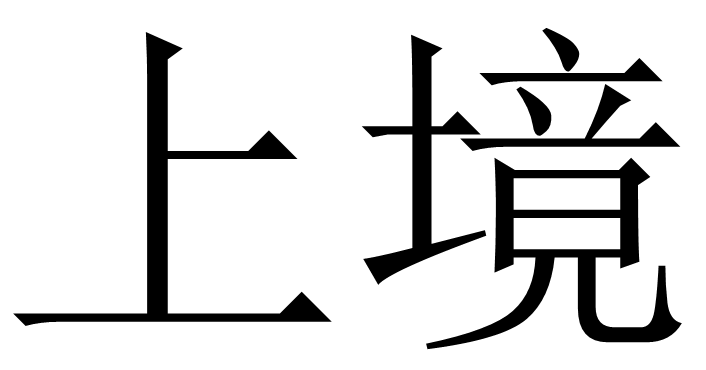
- "Shangjing" in Simplified Chinese characters
- Traditional Chinese: 上境
- Literal meaning: "Wind and water favourable"
Transcriptions
Standard Mandarin
- Hanyu Pinyin: Shàngjìng

Shangjing (上境村) is a village located in Tangxi (汤溪镇), Wucheng District, Jinhua, Zhejiang province, China. It is situated about 30 km to the west of downtown Jinhua and 2.5 km away from the town of Tangxi. The village is bordered by Yue Stream (越溪) in the east, Houdayuan Stream (厚大源) in the south, and Jiufeng Mountain (九峰山) in the west. The village was formerly known as Fenglinzhuang (枫林庄) or "Maple Forest Village" and changed to the current name due to its "wind and water favourable" location, according to the principles of fengshui characteristics.

== Architecture ==
Shangjing still preserves more than 50 ancient houses and 20 historic grand halls that can be dated back to Ming and Qing Dynasties. The village’s buildings are of a typical Wu-style and feature white walls, black tiles ornate wooden cornices, high doors, and lattice windows. Its wood carvings and tile carvings are typical elements of ancient Chinese architecture. Among them is the provincially unique five-room ancestral hall, known as Lui Clan Ancestral Hall, and six other architectural sites: Baishun Hall, Liuji Hall, Qianji Hall, Xizhen Lane, and Folk House 48 (the Upstairs Hall). The Trail Gate Tower, Dragon Eye Well and Lui Clan Ancestral Grave were all named the "Provincial Cultural Relics Protection Units" in January 2017.

== List of Historic sites in Shangjing ==
=== Liu Clan Ancestral Hall ===
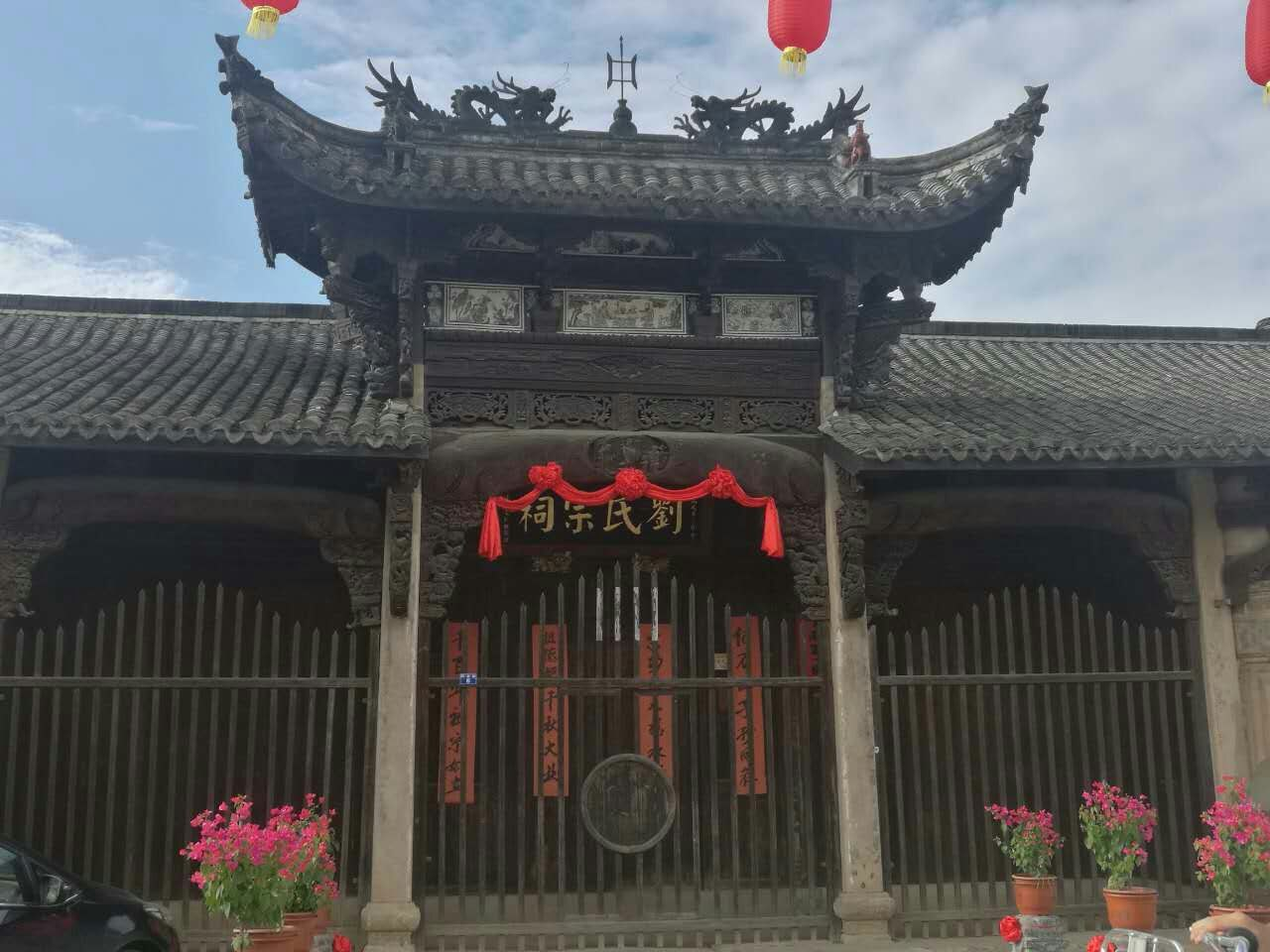
Liu Clan Ancestral Hall (刘氏宗祠)

The hall was initially built in 1264 and reconstructed in 1627 by order of Tianqi Emperor. The whole building is a south oriented three-hall construction covering an area of nearly 3000 square meters. Having a grand door lintel and delicately-carved wooden brackets, the hall assumes an architectural style that is quite rare in the province and earns it the reputation of the main Ancestral Temple of Tangxi. Liu Clan Ancestral Hall is one of the “two and half ancestral halls” widely known in Jinhua. The complex has been listed as a “Provincial Cultural Relics Protection Unit” in Zhejiang.

=== Screen Wall of Auspiciousness ===
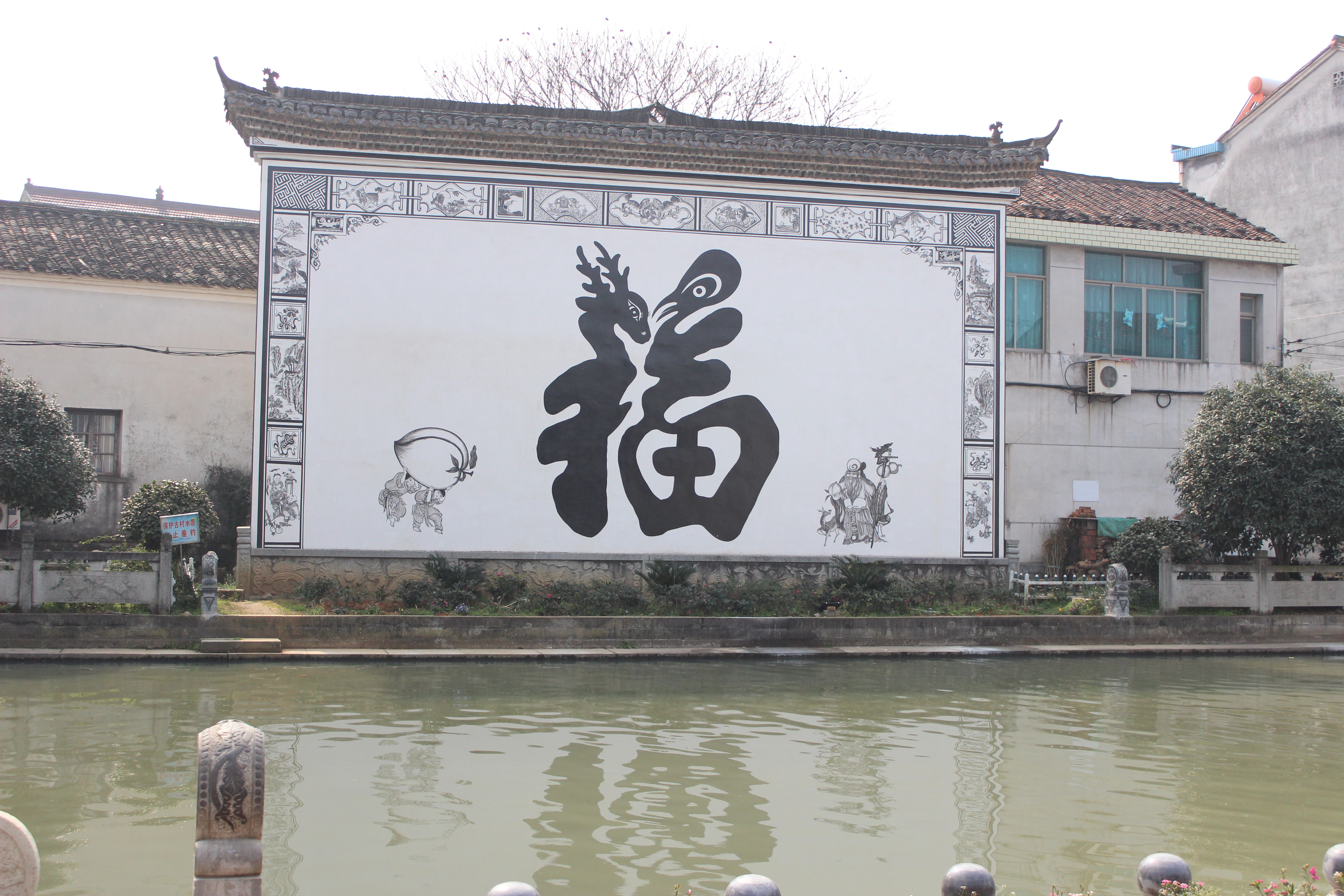
Screen Wall of Auspiciousness (吉祥照壁)

The screen wall is a brick construction consisting of a pedestal, a body, a top and a Chinese character "福" (fú, meaning "blessing") in the middle. Screen walls of auspiciousness like this were very popular in the Ming Dynasty (1368 – 1644) and acted as screen against the penetration of wind and evil and the dissipation of qi. On the right side of the wall is a deer, which in Chinese is homophonic to "禄" (lù) meaning "wealth". On the left side is a crane implying longevity. These carvings together with peaches and old men around the wall and on four corners convey a wish of auspiciousness, wealth, and longevity.

=== Chengqi Hall Site ===
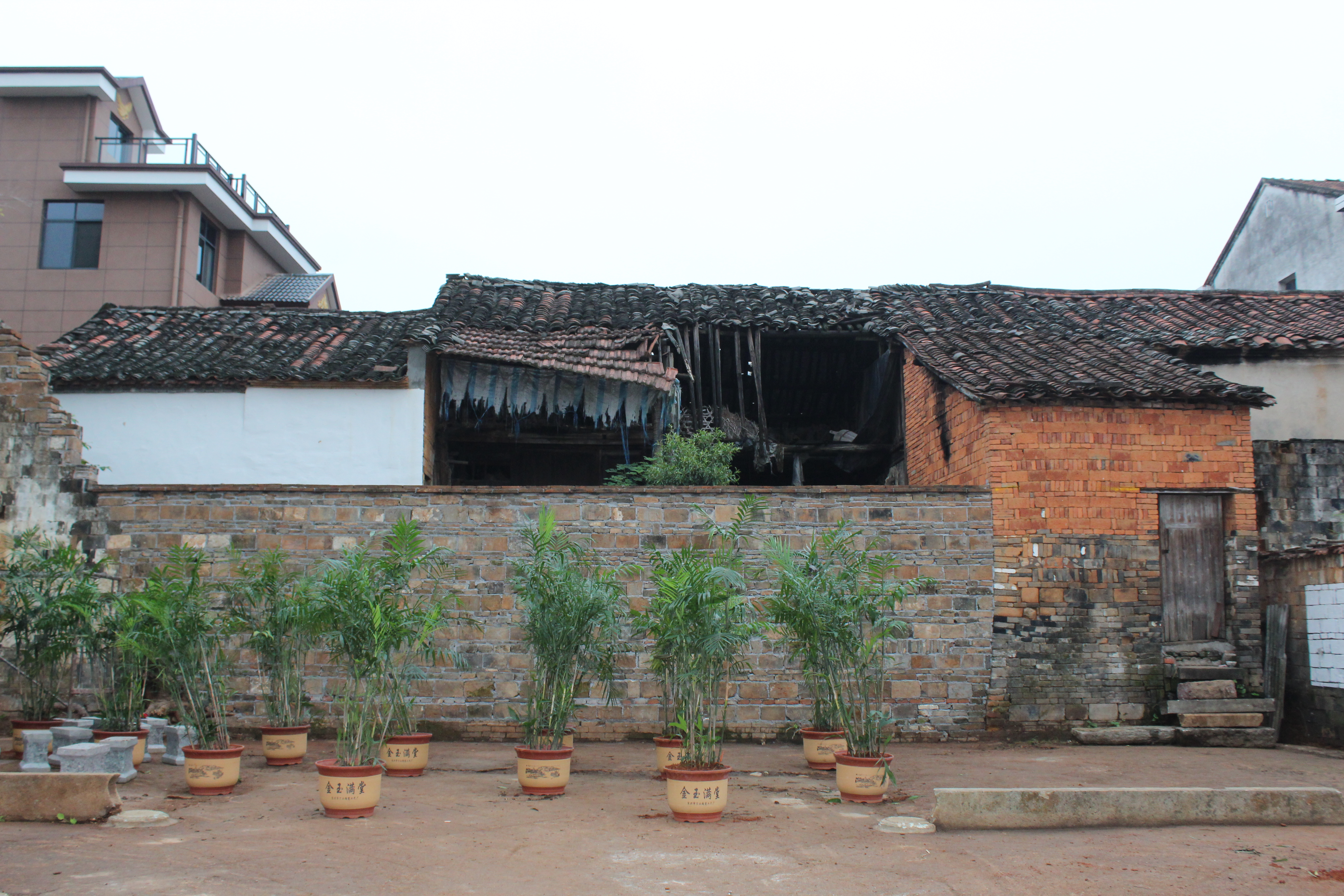
Chengqi Hall Site (承启堂遗址)

Chengqi Hall was built in the early Ming Dynasty. "承启" (chéng qǐ) means "taking over from the past and setting a new course for the future; glorifying forefathers and enriching posterity". It was said that Chengqi Hall was built by the eldest (Liu Fushigong) of three brothers, who belong to the Fu generation of Liu clan. The building is structurally compact and delicate, using brick beams and columns near the wall of the hall. So the hall is also known as brick hall. Now only the eastern rooms remain.

=== Lamei Hall ===
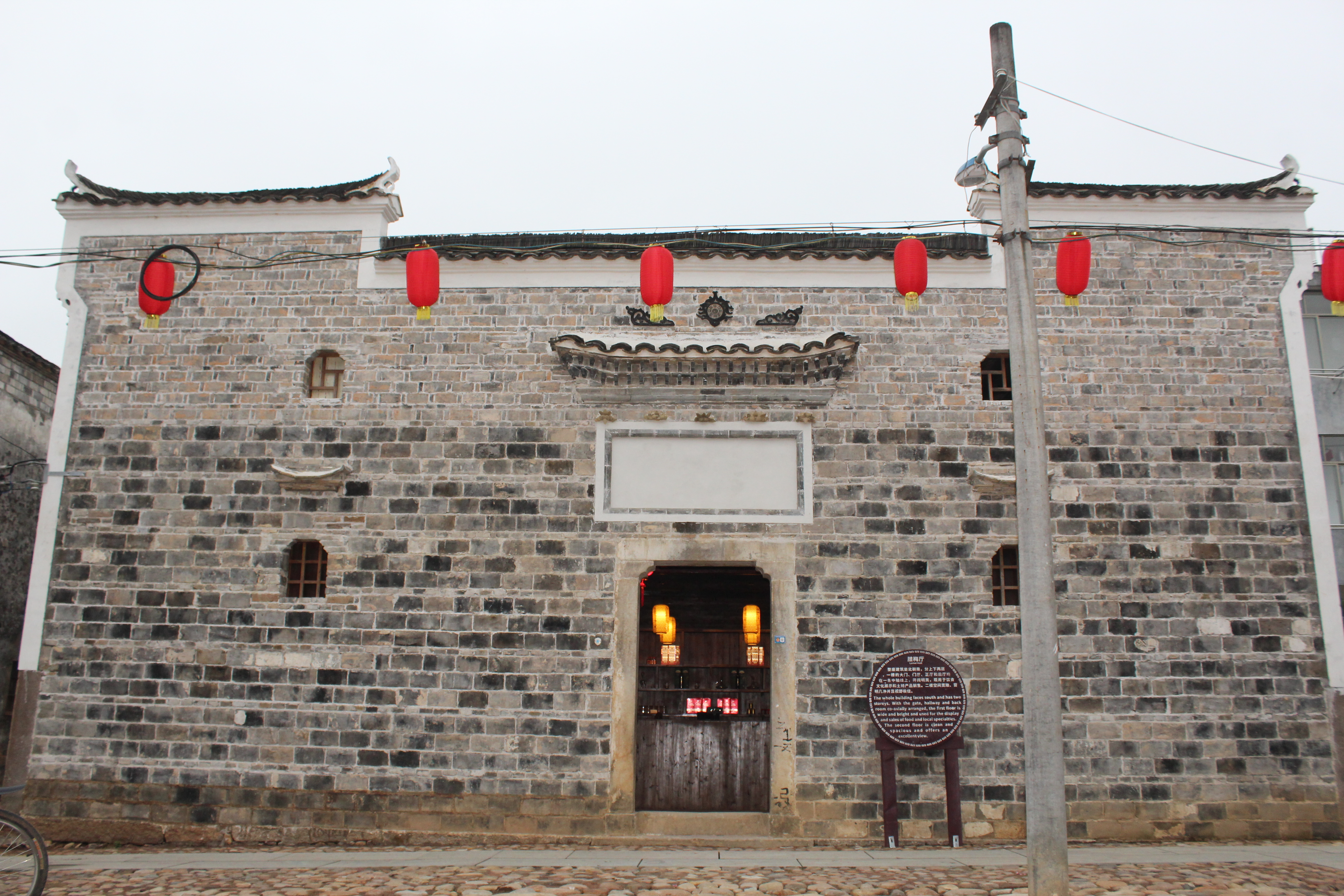
Lamei Hall (腊梅厅)

The entire building faces south and has two storeys. With the gate, hallways and back room co-axially arranged, the first floor is wide and used for the display and sales of food and local specialties. The second floor is spacious enough to offer an excellent view as a lounge where visitors can watch all kinds of performances put on outside down on the ground.

=== Chongli Hall ===
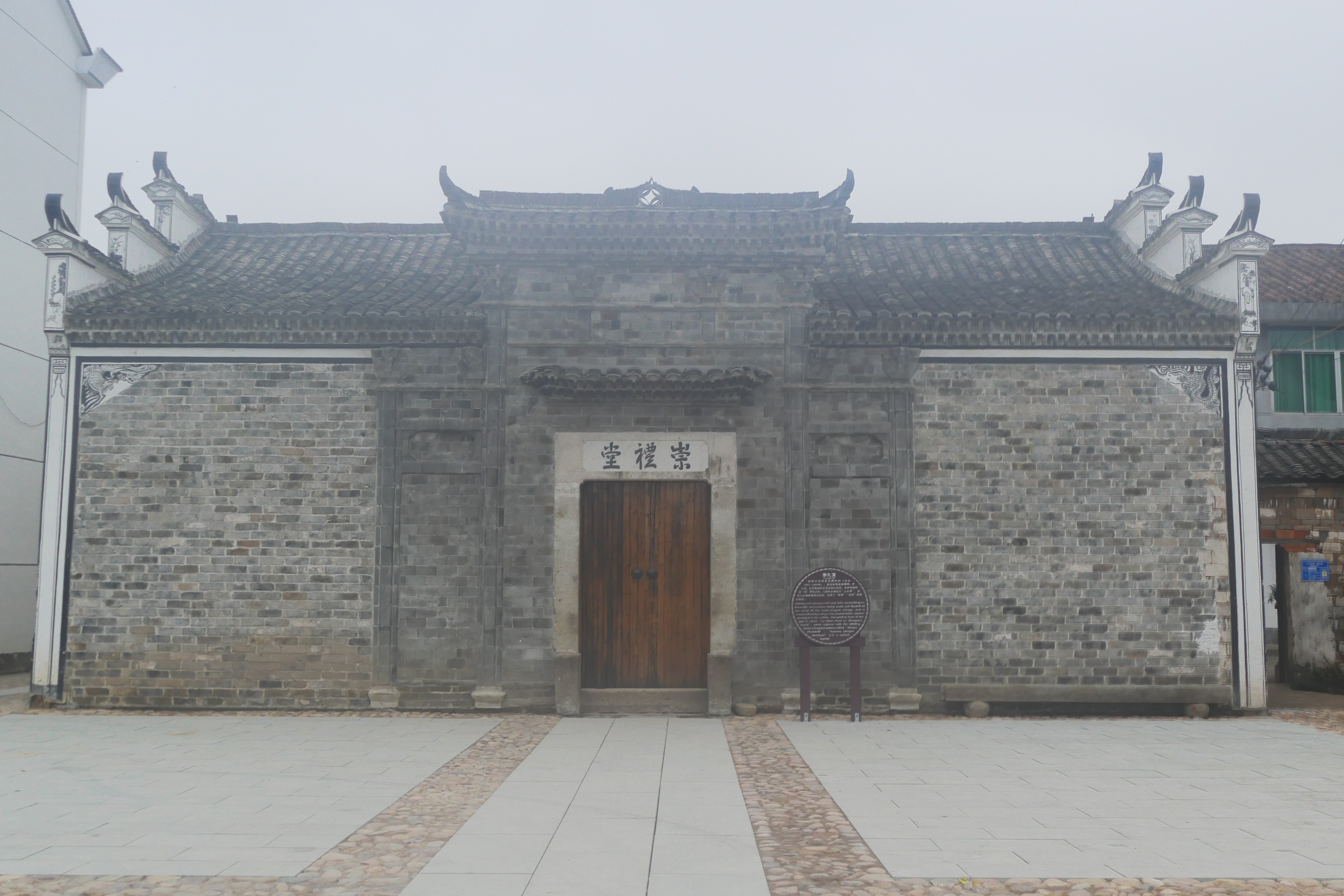
Chongli Hall (崇礼堂)

Chongli Hall was initially built from 1457 to 1464. It is a three-hall construction facing south and located on the head of the boat-shaped village, and is characterized by a unique two-homocentric squares courtyard in the middle. The pond in front of the gate is called "Up Water Pond" (or Shangshui Pond), which together with the building forms a fengshui pattern called "Zhuque" (firebird) – "Xuanwu" (dragon tortoise) (i.e. a spatial layout) and acts for fire prevention purpose.

=== Baishun Hall ===
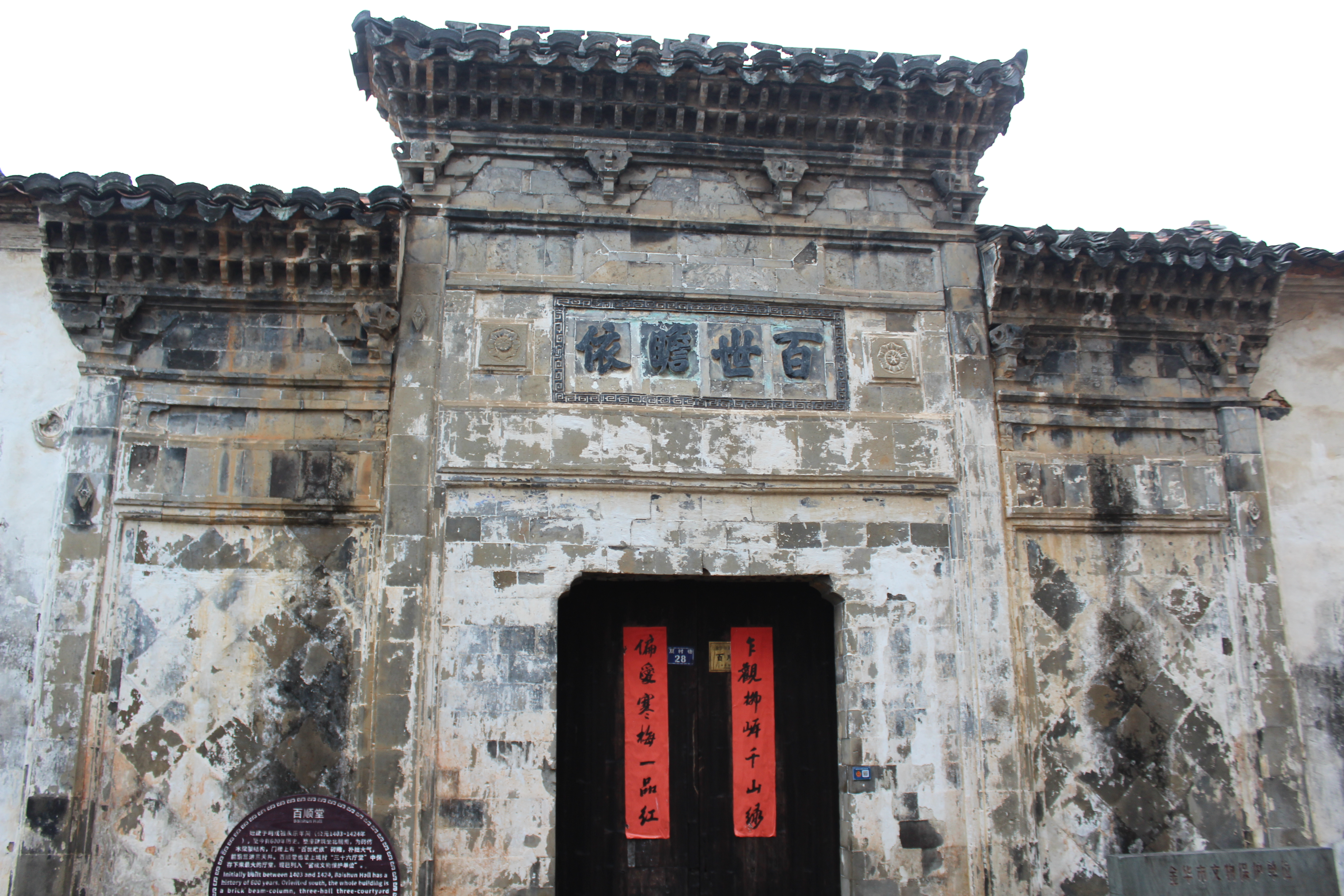
Baishun Hall (百顺堂)

Baishun Hall was initially built between 1403 and 1424, and is also known as Lower Hall. It was built by the second elder brother (Liu Fushiwugong) of three brothers who belong to the Fu generation of Liu clan, and has a history of 600 years. Oriented south, the whole building is a brick beam-column, three-hall three-courtyard construction, carrying a plain but lofty brick carving of "百世瞻依" (pinyin: bǎi shì zhān yī; lit. 'forefathers to be looked up for hundreds of generations') on the arch. The central bay has a removable stage, and rooms on the left and right sides are made into elevated balconies for high officials and noble lords to watch the performance do recreational activities. Large timber is used in the middle hall, with beams and columns up to 60 cm in diameter. The hall is three-room wide and nine-purlin deep, which was typical in Ming Dynasty. Baishun Hall is the biggest among the “36 halls” so far preserved in Shangjing Village and appears on the list of Provincial Cultural Relics Protection Units.

=== Liuji Hall ===
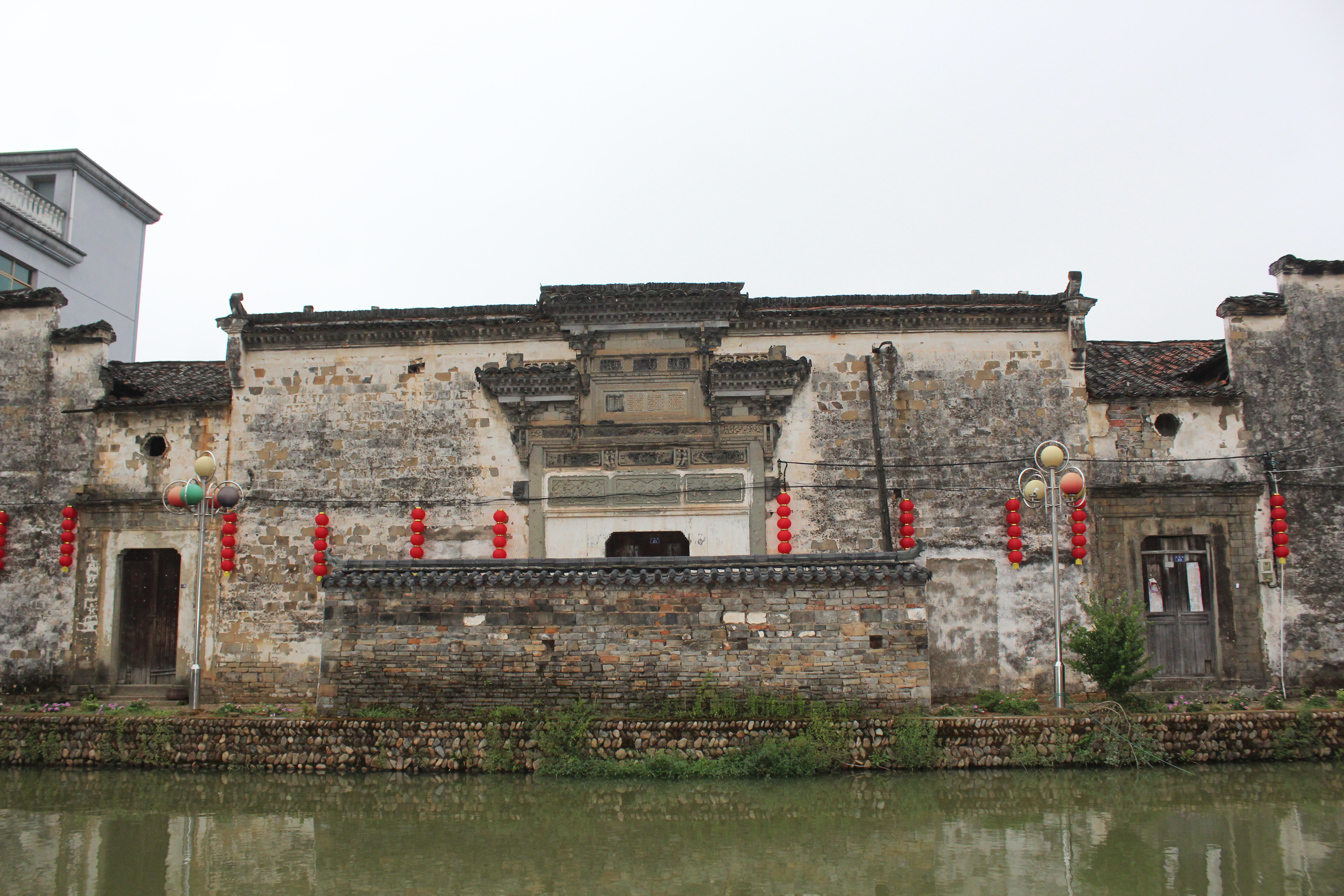
Liuji Hall (六吉堂)

Liuji Hall was built with the financial support of Liu Zhaogan, the Grand Preceptor of Emperor Jiaqing. The whole building is southwest oriented. It covers an area of 306m2, and appears on the list of Provincial Cultural Relics Protection Units. The lintel of the gate is engraved with "福禄寿喜" (pinyin: fú lù shòu xǐ; lit. 'blessing', 'wealth', 'longevity and happiness') as well as various auspicious patterns. On the bottom left of the gate are horse and monkey carvings, implying quick promotion, and on the bottom right are deer and crane carvings, implying eternal prosperity. The hall is three-room wide and is connected with walls on both sides, and each wall has a side door to form a courtyard. Inside the hall preserved wood carvings with animate figures of characters, flowers and vases.

=== Tail Gate Tower ===
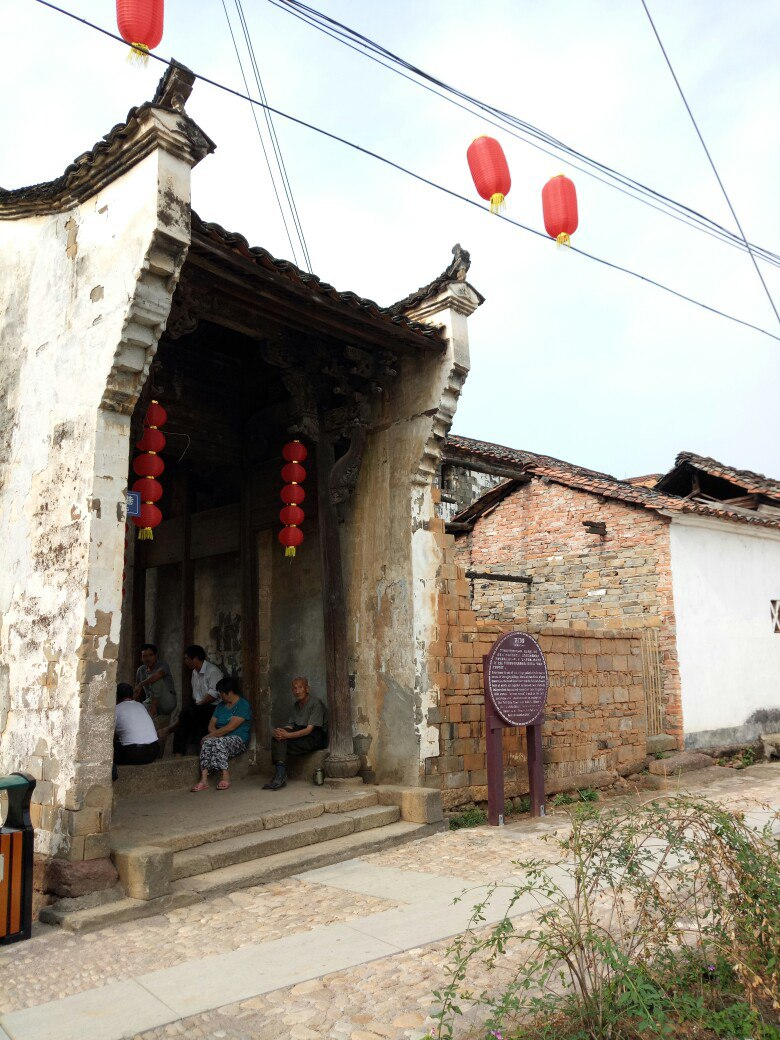
Tail Gate Tower (下门楼)

Tail Gate tower is one of the bridge galleries built over a street. In Shangjing Village, there are two kinds of gate towers, i.e. the Head Gate Tower and the Tail Gate Tower, both of which act together to connect two relatively independent houses and make them look integrated. With arches, "women needn’t walk on the road and shoes won\t be dampened on a rainy day". They also provide a space for folks to chitchat. The Tail Gate Tower was built in Qianlong Period of the Qing Dynasty and has been listed as a Provincial Cultural Relics Protection Unit.

=== Yuanji Hall ===
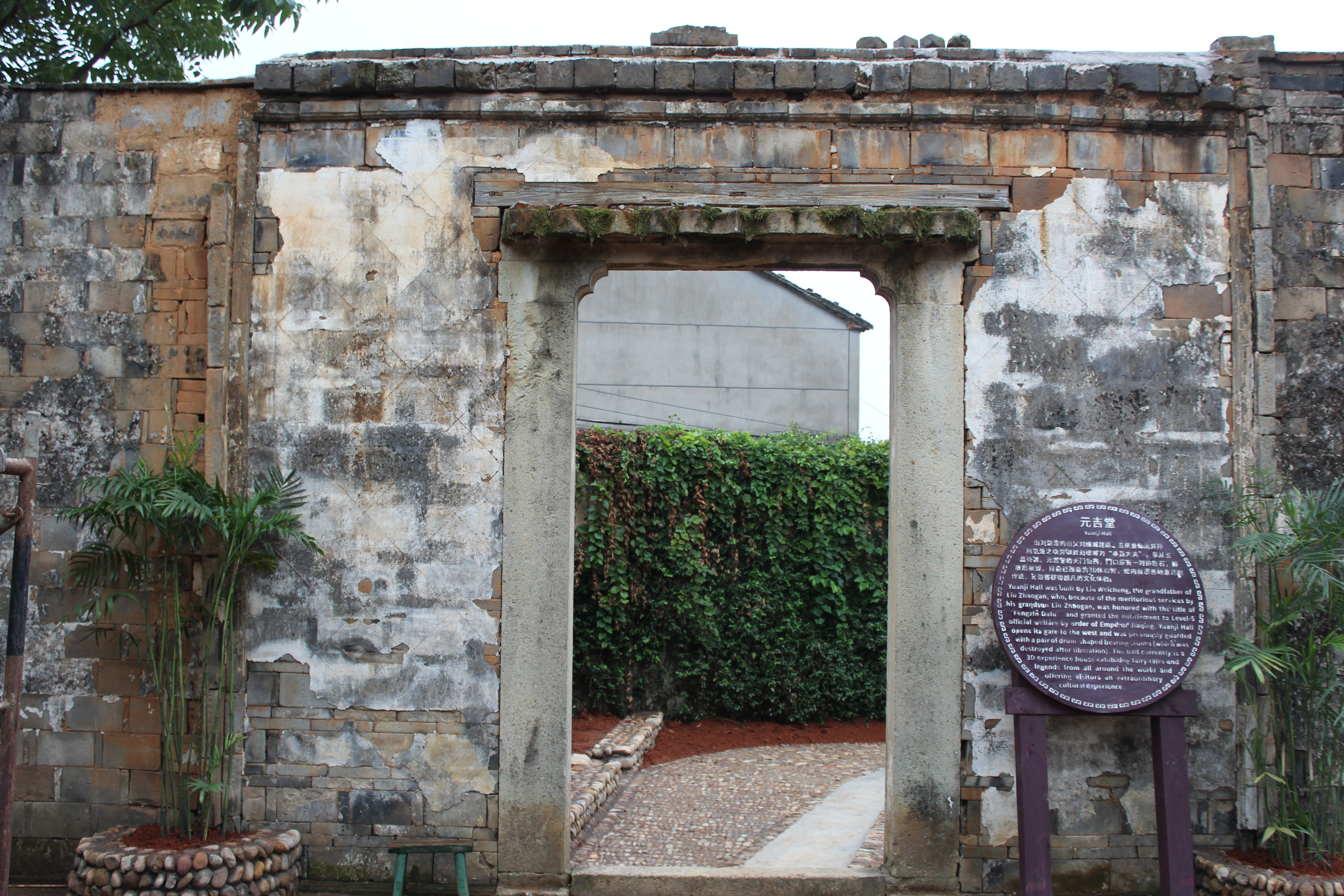
Yuanji Hall (元吉堂)

Yuanji Hall was built by Liu Weicheng, the grandfather of Liu Zhaogan. Because of the meritorious services by his grandson Liu Zhaogan, he was honored with the title of "Fengzhi Dafu" and granted the entitlement to Level-5 official welfare by order of Emperor Jiaqing. Yuanji Hall opens its gate to the west and was previously guarded with a pair of drum-shaped bearing stones (destroyed after liberation). The hall currently is a 3D experience house exhibiting fairy tales and legends from all around the world and offering visitors an extraordinary cultural experience.

=== Liu Zhaogan’s Former Residence ===
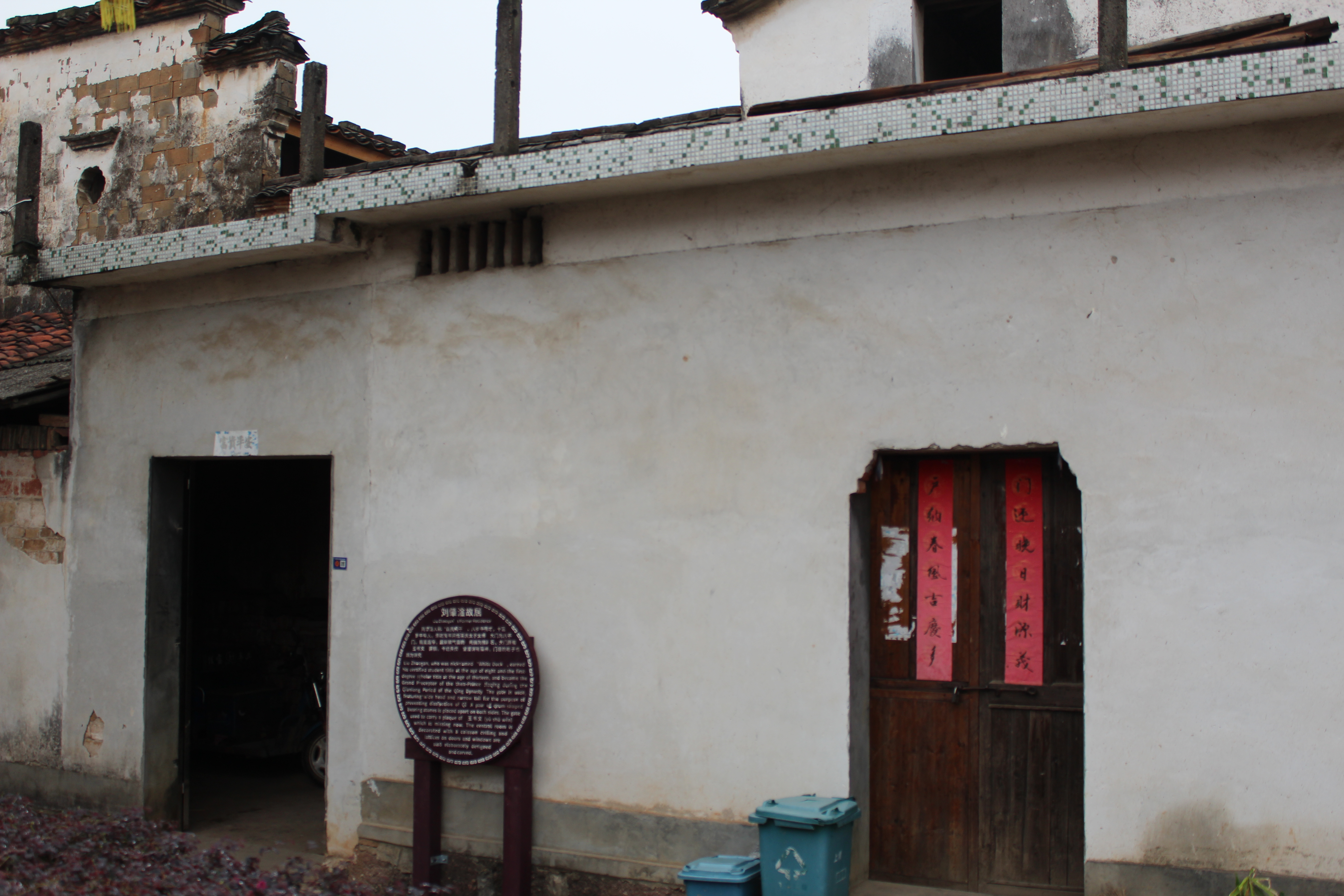
Liu Zhaogan’s Former Residence (刘肇淦故居)

Liu Zhaogan, who was nicknamed “White Duck”, earned his certified student title at the age of eight, the first-degree scholar title at the age of thirteen, and became the Grand Preceptor of the then-Prince Jiaqing during the Qianlong Period of the Qing Dynasty. The gate is wide, featuring wide head and narrow tail for the purpose of preventing dissipation of Qi. A pair of drum-shaped bearing stones, which was a typical indication of the architectural class and family status of dignitaries in the Qing Dynasty, is placed apart on both sides. The gate used to carry a plaque of "玉书文" (yù shū wén) which is missing now. The central room is decorated with a caisson ceiling and lattices on doors and windows are also elaborately designed and carved. The sparrow braces above the gourd beam are carved with two animate goldfish, symbolizing auspiciousness and richness, and the beautiful lotus on the brackets implies the identity of the house owner.

=== Sutra Hall Site ===
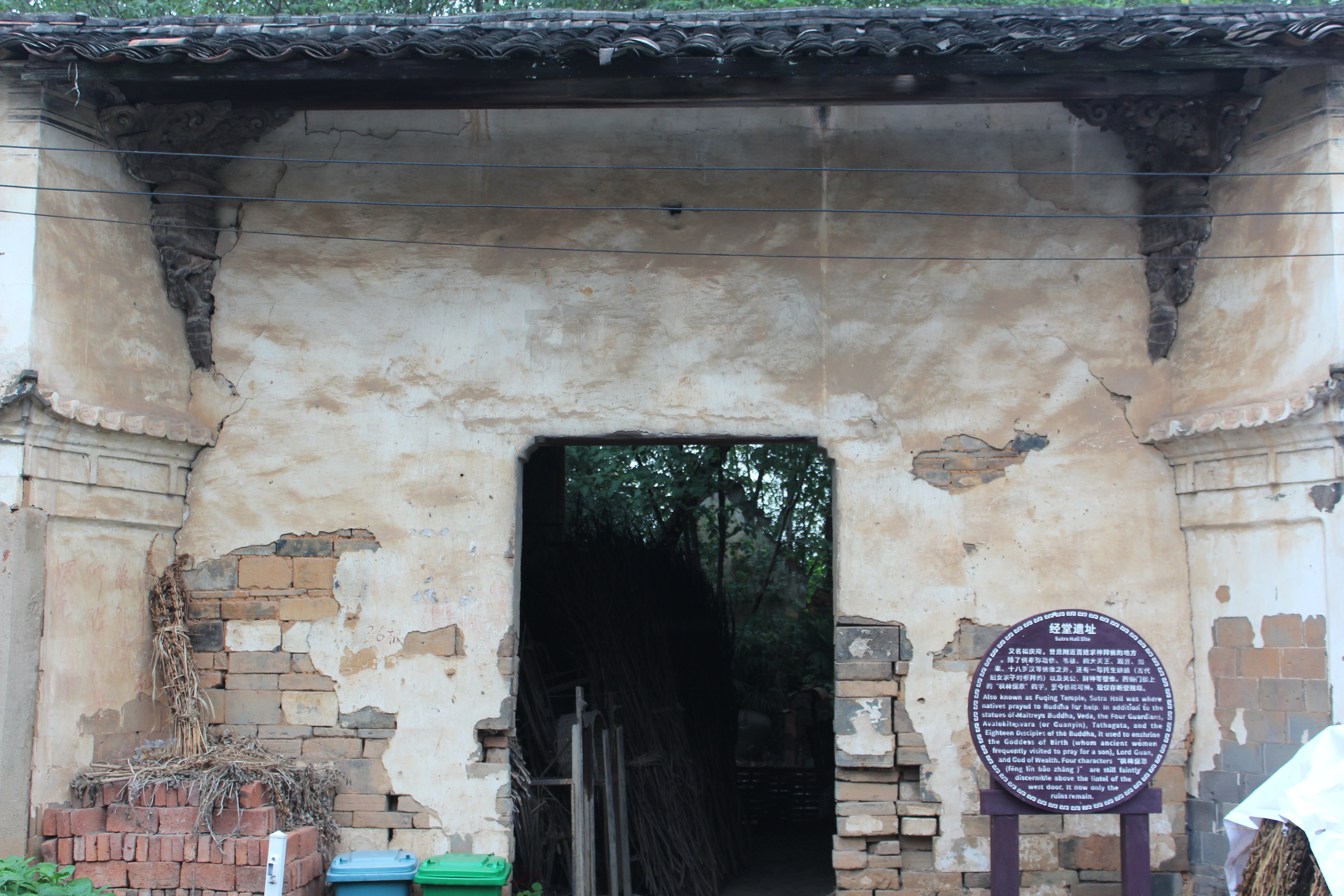
Sutra Hall Site (经堂遗址)

Sutra Hall, also known as Fuqing Temple, was the place where natives prayed to Buddha for help. In addition to the statues of Maitreya Buddha, Weituo Bodhisattva, the Four Guardians, Avalokitesvara (or Guanyin), Tathagata, and the Eighteen Disciples of the Buddha, it used to enshrine the Goddess of Birth (whom ancient women frequently visited to pray for a son), Lord Guan, and God of Wealth. Four characters "枫林保章" (fēng lín bǎo zhāng) are still faintly discernible above the lintel of the west door. Compared with the past prosperity, now only the ruins remain.

== History ==
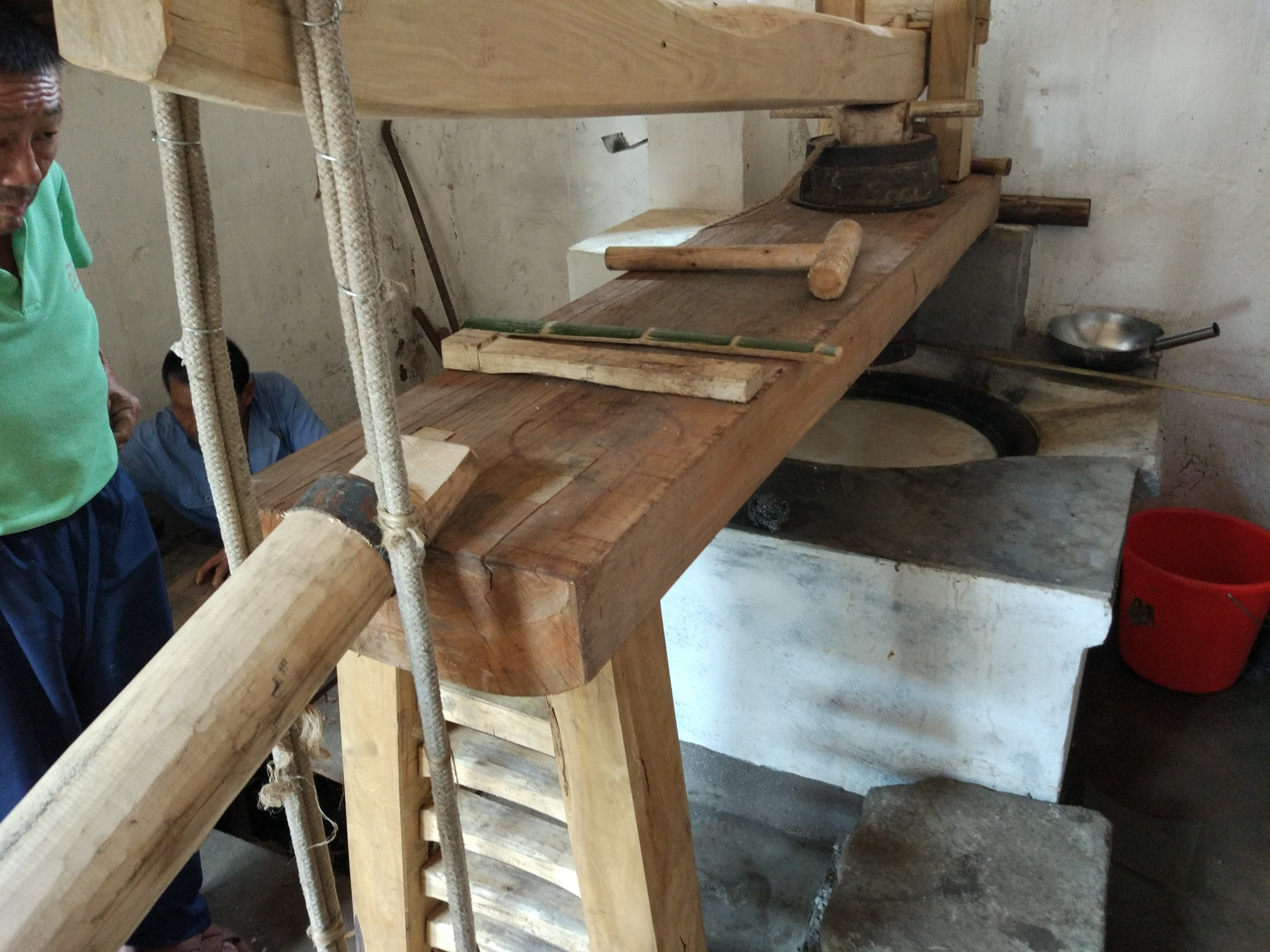
Making of cold noodles (水索粉)

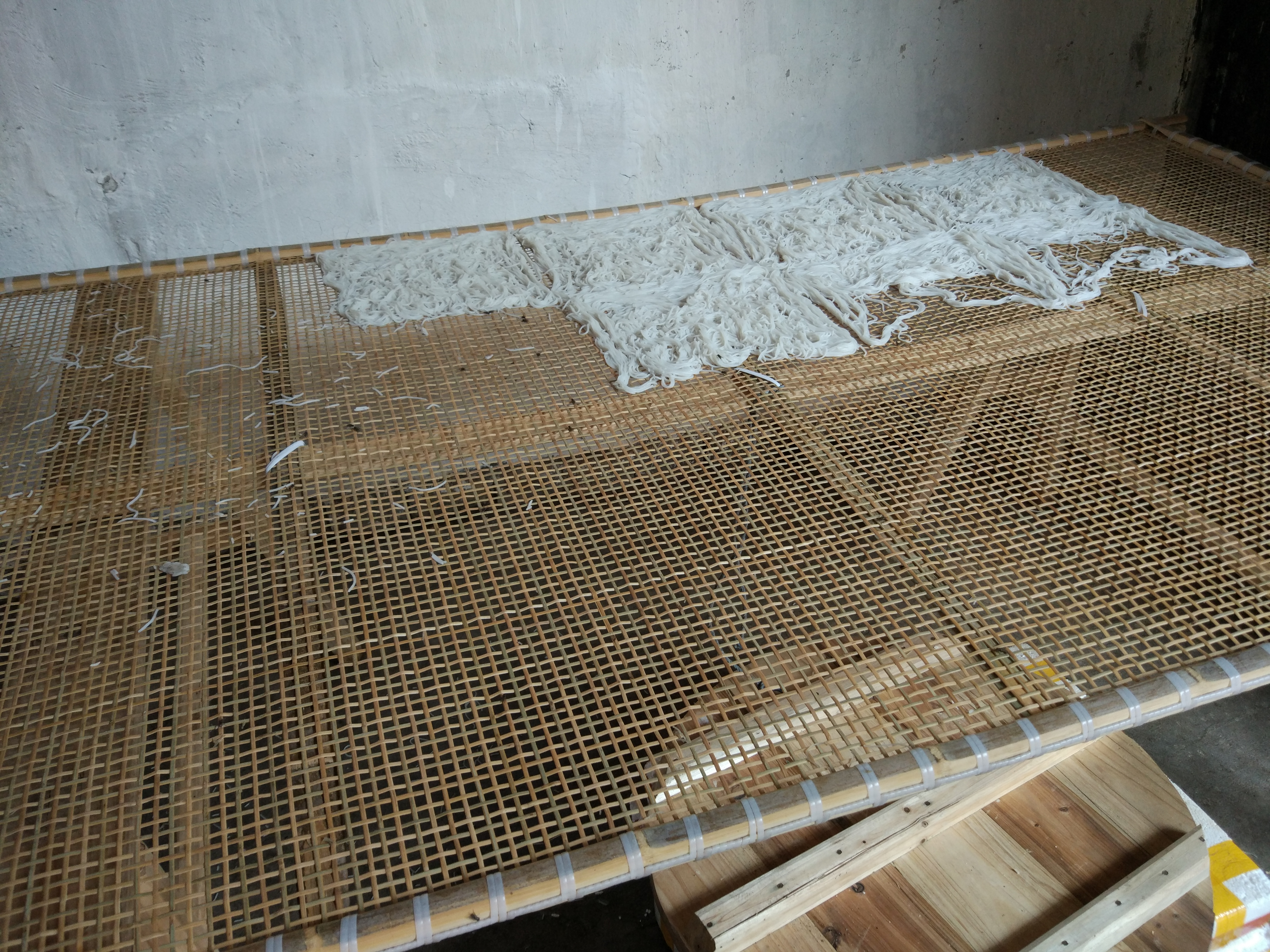
Making of cold noodles (水索粉)

The village was founded in 1048 when Liu Qing, the first ancestor of the Liu clan, settled there, the clan has been living in the village for 36 generations. The village is surrounded by two streams, called Dongzhen (东圳) and Xizhen (西圳), respectively and dotted with ancient alleys, houses, halls, and wells here and there.

The village is known for its cultural heritage, farming tradition, tea plantation, historical buildings, traditional dishes, traditional dances and costumes, and sites such as the Xifen artificial lake and a 1500 year old Buddhist temple near Jiufeng Mountain.

Apart from its signature Jinhua ham the village itself is known for its traditional dishes such as cow's hoof (牛蹄), fish (石斑鱼), fried chicken (生炒鸡) and cold noodles (水索粉).

== Transportation ==
Jinhua is approximately four hours by car from Shanghai. There is also the G-train (Gaotie High speed train) which takes approximately 2 hours to get to Jinhua Railway Station. There is a public bus to Tangxi town and another bus straight to the village. The village is close to Tangxi and there are footpaths and road links to the village.
