= Zhuma =

Zhuma may refer to:

- Zhuma Township, a township in Jinhua, Zhejiang, China
- Zhuma, Jiangsu (朱码), a town in Lianshui County, Jiangsu, China
