= Tangxi railway station =

Tangxi railway station may refer to:

- Tangxi railway station (Guangzhou), torn down to make way for the Guangzhou Baiyun railway station
- Tangxi railway station (Jinhua), a disused station in Tangxi, Jinhua
