= Zhuma Township =

- Township

Chinese transcription(s)
  - Simplified: 竹马乡
  - Traditional: 竹馬鄉
  - Pinyin: Zhúmǎ Xiāng
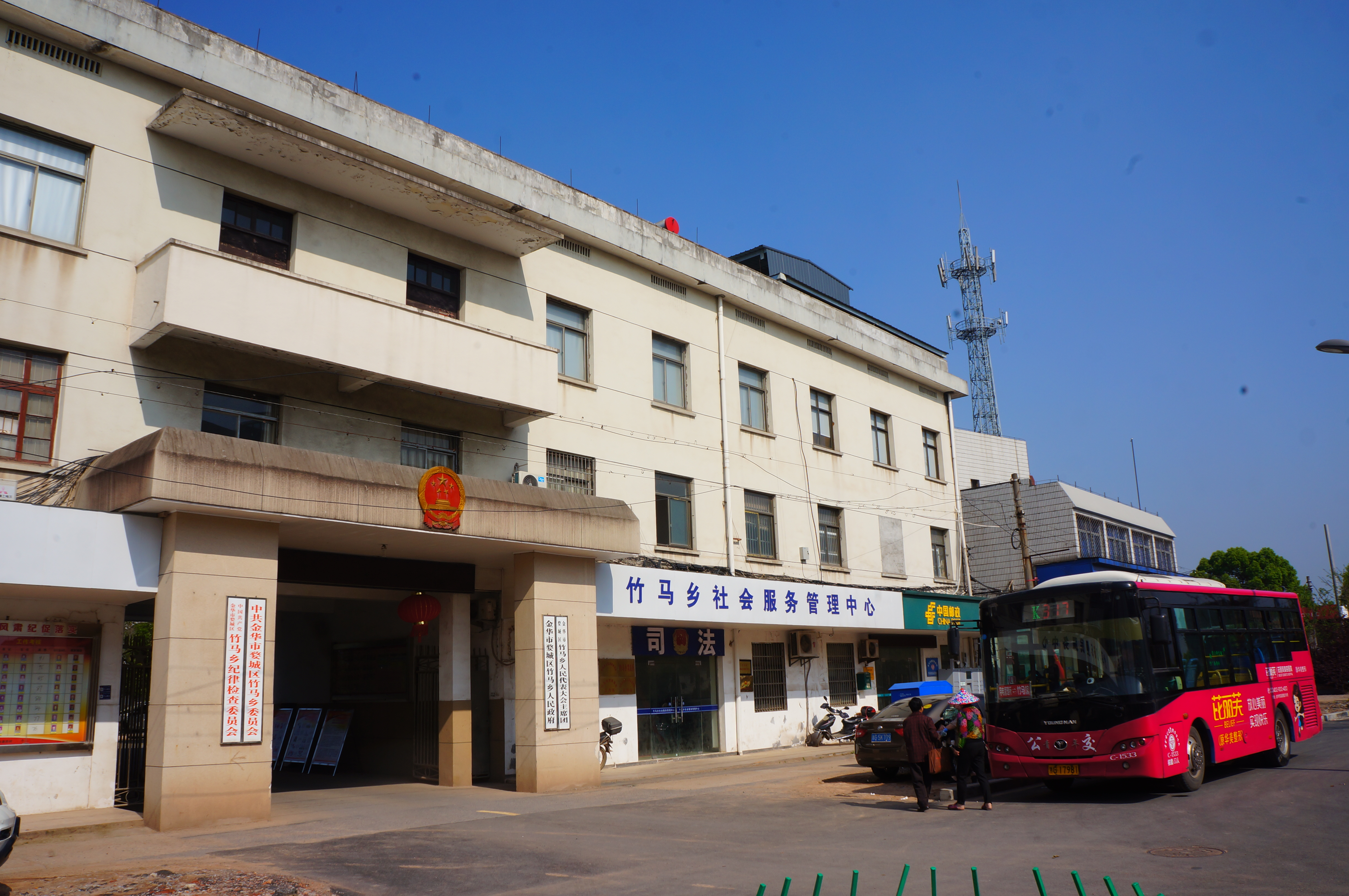
- The People's Government building of Zhuma Township.

- Location in Zhejiang
- Coordinates: 29°08′25.8″N 119°35′09.24″E
- Country: China
- Province: Zhejiang
- Prefecture: Jinhua
- China: Wucheng District

Area
  - Total: 23.6 km^{2} (9.1 sq mi)

Population (2017)
  - Total: 11,000
  - Density: 470/km^{2} (1,200/sq mi)
- Time zone: UTC+8 (China Standard)
- Postal code: 321021
- Area code: 0579

Zhuma Township (Chinese: 竹马乡) is a rural township in Wucheng District of Jinhua, eastern China's Zhejiang province. As of the 2017 census it had a population of 11,000 and an area of 23.6-square-kilometre (9.1 sq mi). It is surrounded by Lanxi city on the northwest, Luodian Town on the east, and Qianxi Township on the south. It is hailed as the hometown of Camellia.

== Transportation ==
Zhumaguan railway station (Chinese: 竹马馆站) serves the town.

Jinhua-Qiandaohu railway (Chinese: 金华千岛湖铁路) passes across the township.

Hangzhou-Jinhua-Quzhou Expressway (Chinese: 杭金衢高速公路) runs through the township.

The Second Ring Road (Chinese: 二环线) travels through the township.
