= Jinlan Reservoir =

Reservoir located in Langya Town of Jinhua, Zhejiang, China

- Jinlantang Reservoir
- 金兰水库 (Chinese)
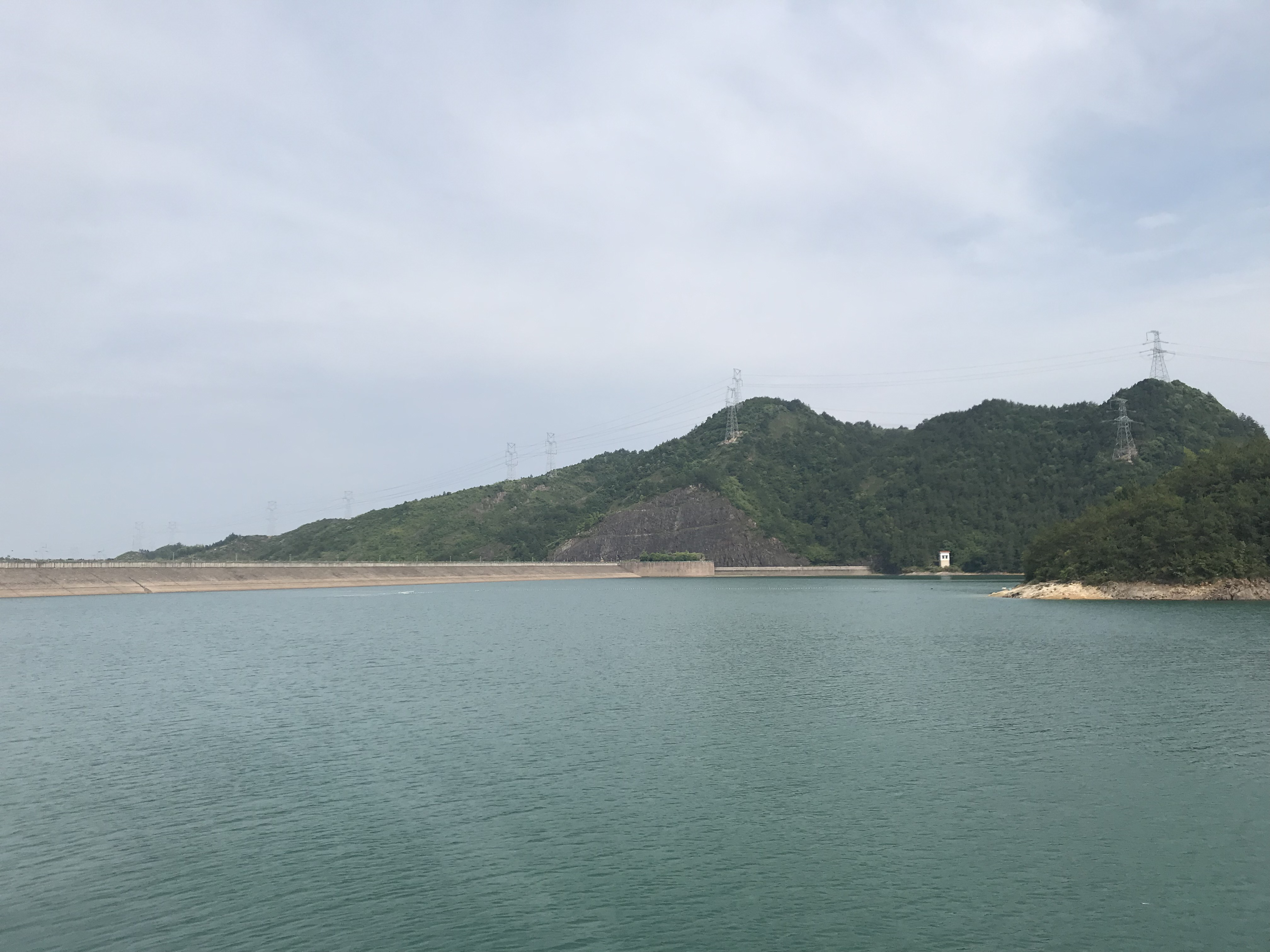
- View of Jinlan Reservoir from Dongxikeng Pier.

- Location within Zhejiang
- Location: Langya Town, Jinhua, Zhejiang, China
- Coordinates: 28°58′31.66″N 119°28′31.33″E
- Type: Reservoir
- Primary outflows: Baisha Stream
- Basin countries: China
- Built: 1960
- First flooded: 1960
- Surface area: 270 square kilometres (67,000 acres)
- Water volume: 68,000,000 cubic metres (18×10^{9} US gal)
- Surface elevation: 122 metres (400 ft)

Jinlan Reservoir (simplified Chinese: 金兰水库; traditional Chinese: 金蘭水庫; pinyin: Jīnlán Shuǐkù), also known as Jinlantang Reservoir (simplified Chinese: 金兰汤水库; traditional Chinese: 金蘭湯水庫), is a large reservoir located in Langya Town of Jinhua, Zhejiang, China. The reservoir is the source of the Baisha Stream, a tributary of Jinhua River. With an area of 270 square kilometres (67,000 acres), the reservoir has a capacity of 68,000,000 cubic metres (18×10^{9} US gal).

== History ==
Construction of Jinlan Reservoir, designed by the local government, commenced in April 1958 and was completed in September 1960.

== Dam ==
The dam of Jinlan Reservoir is 44.6 metres (146 ft) high and 712 metres (2,336 ft) long.

== Function ==
Jinlan Reservoir belongs to the first grade water source protection area (一级水源保护区) and is part of Jinhua's water supply network.

The reservoir provides drinking water and water for irrigation and recreational activities.

== Public Access ==
Andi Reservoir open to visitors for free. Fishing and hiking are activities around the reservoir.

== Gallery ==
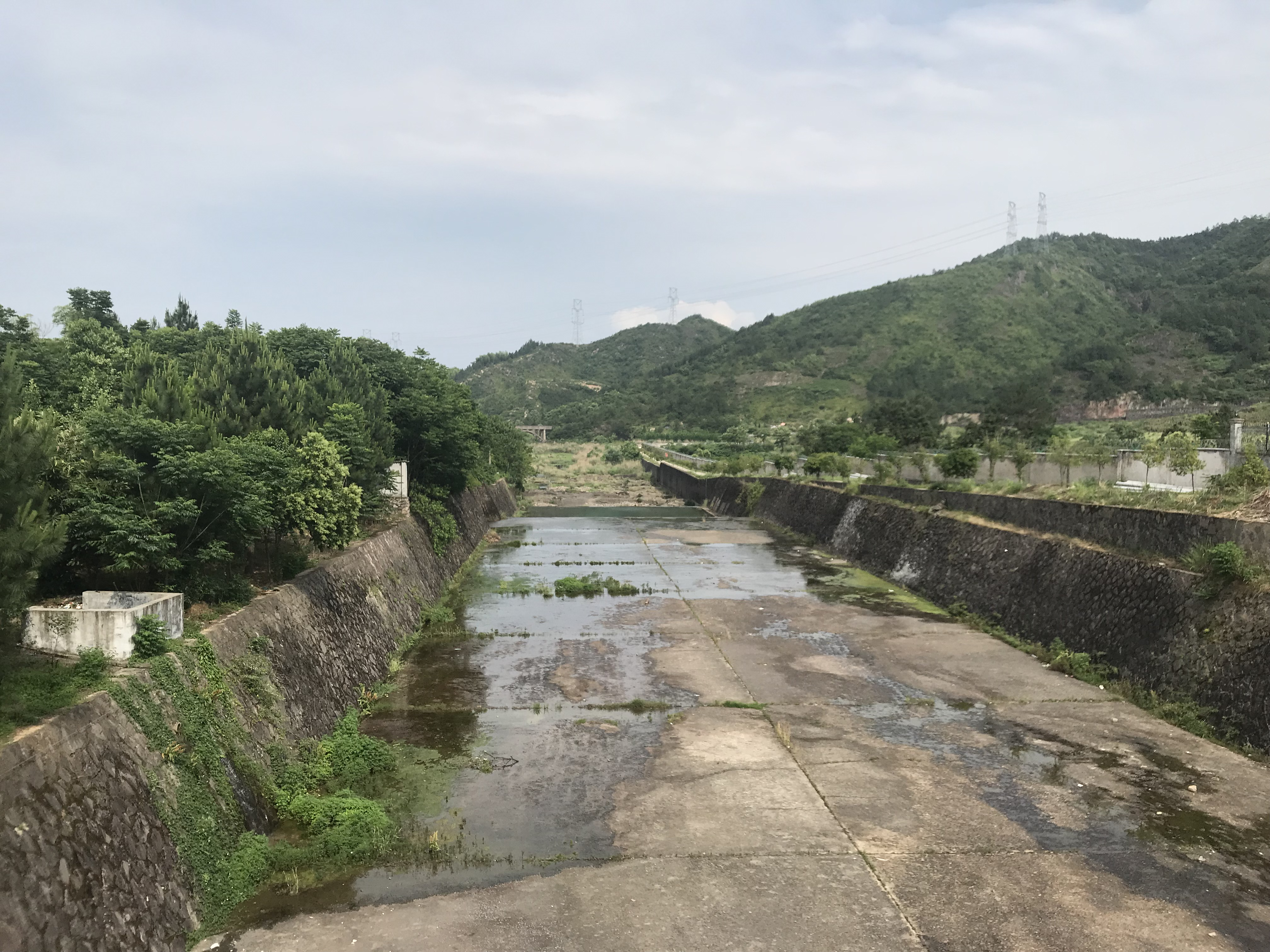
Floodway of Jinlan Reservoir.

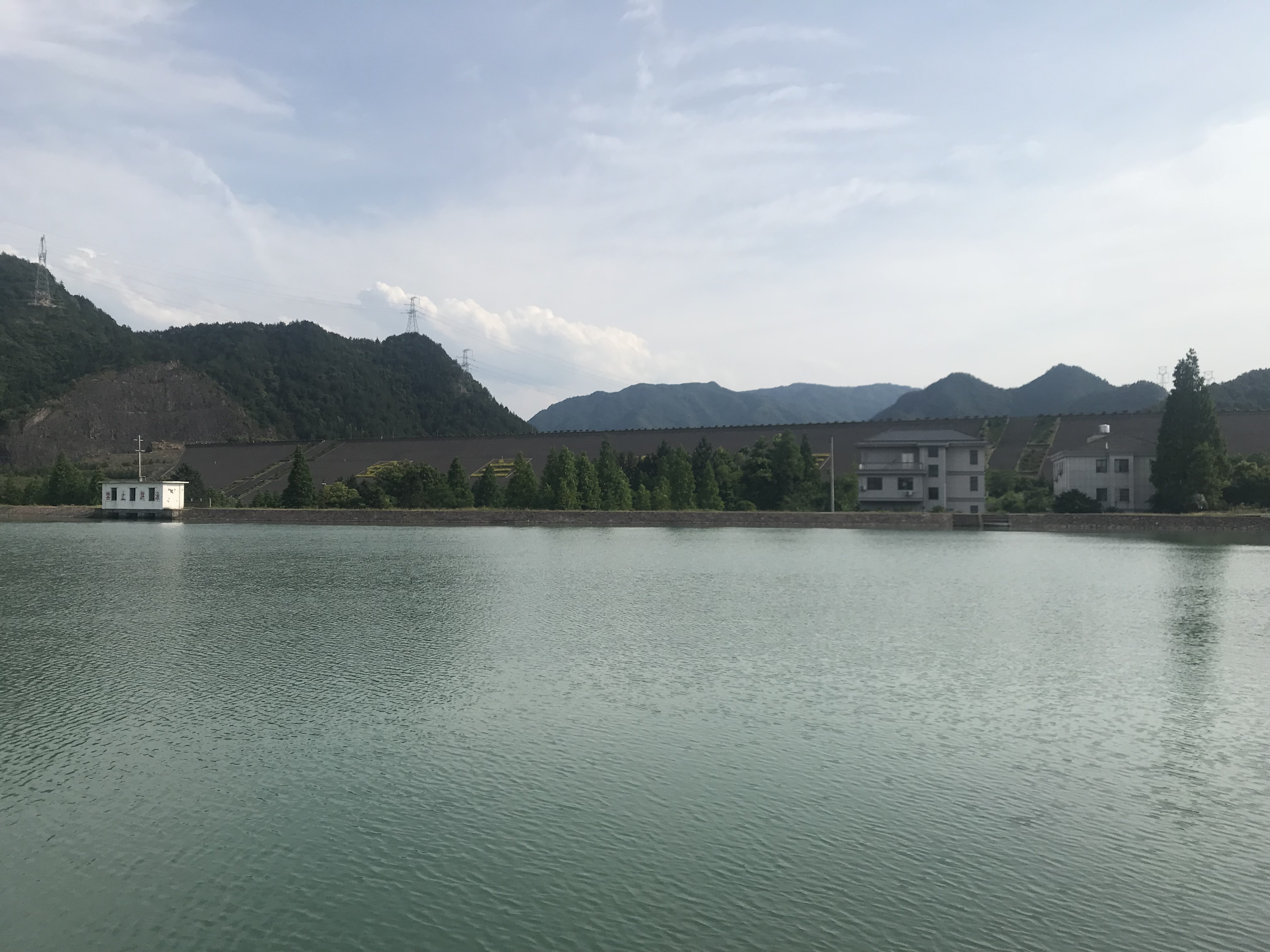
The dam of Jinlan Reservoir.
