= Wucheng, Jinhua =

Wucheng 婺城区
- District
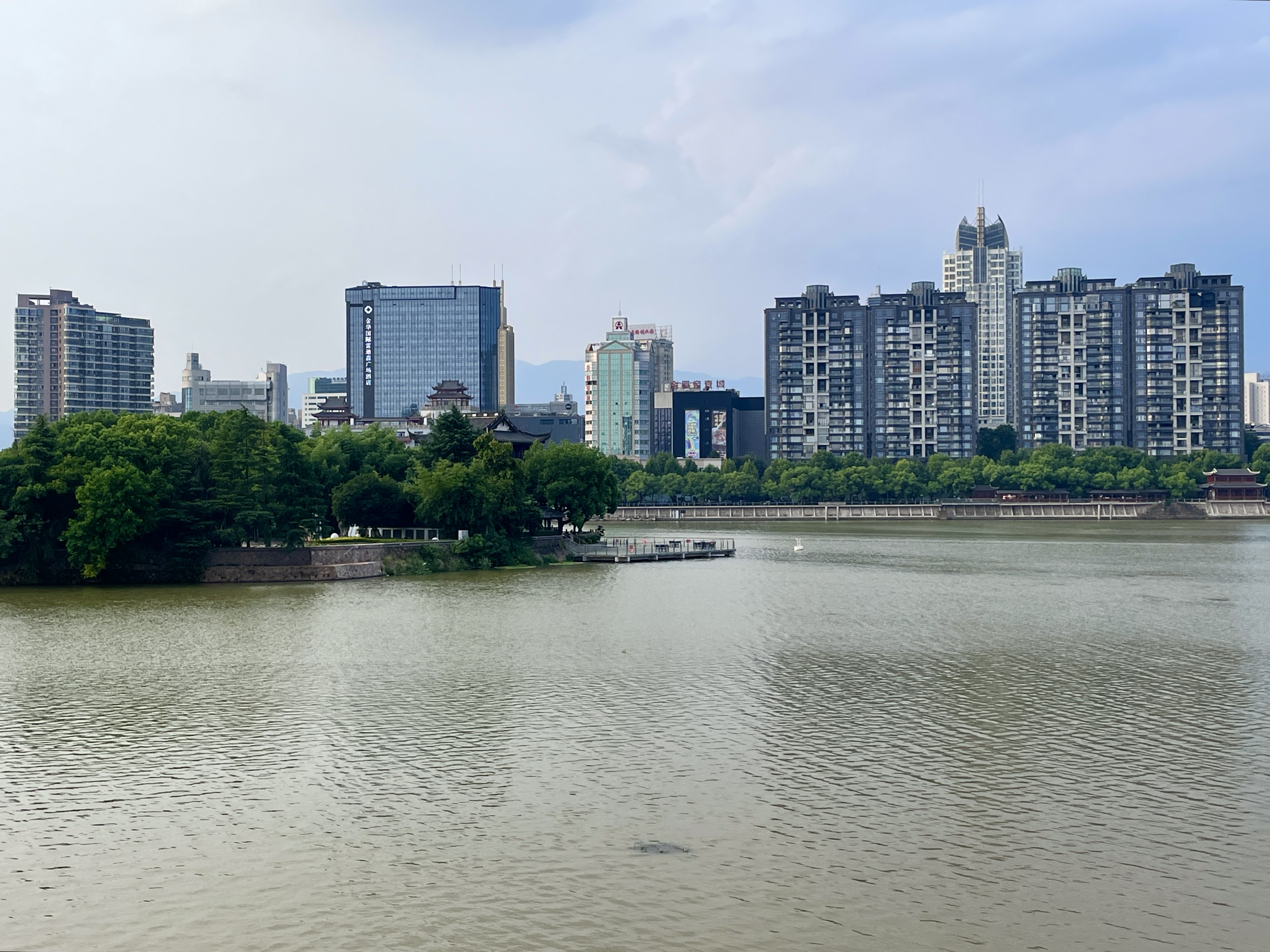

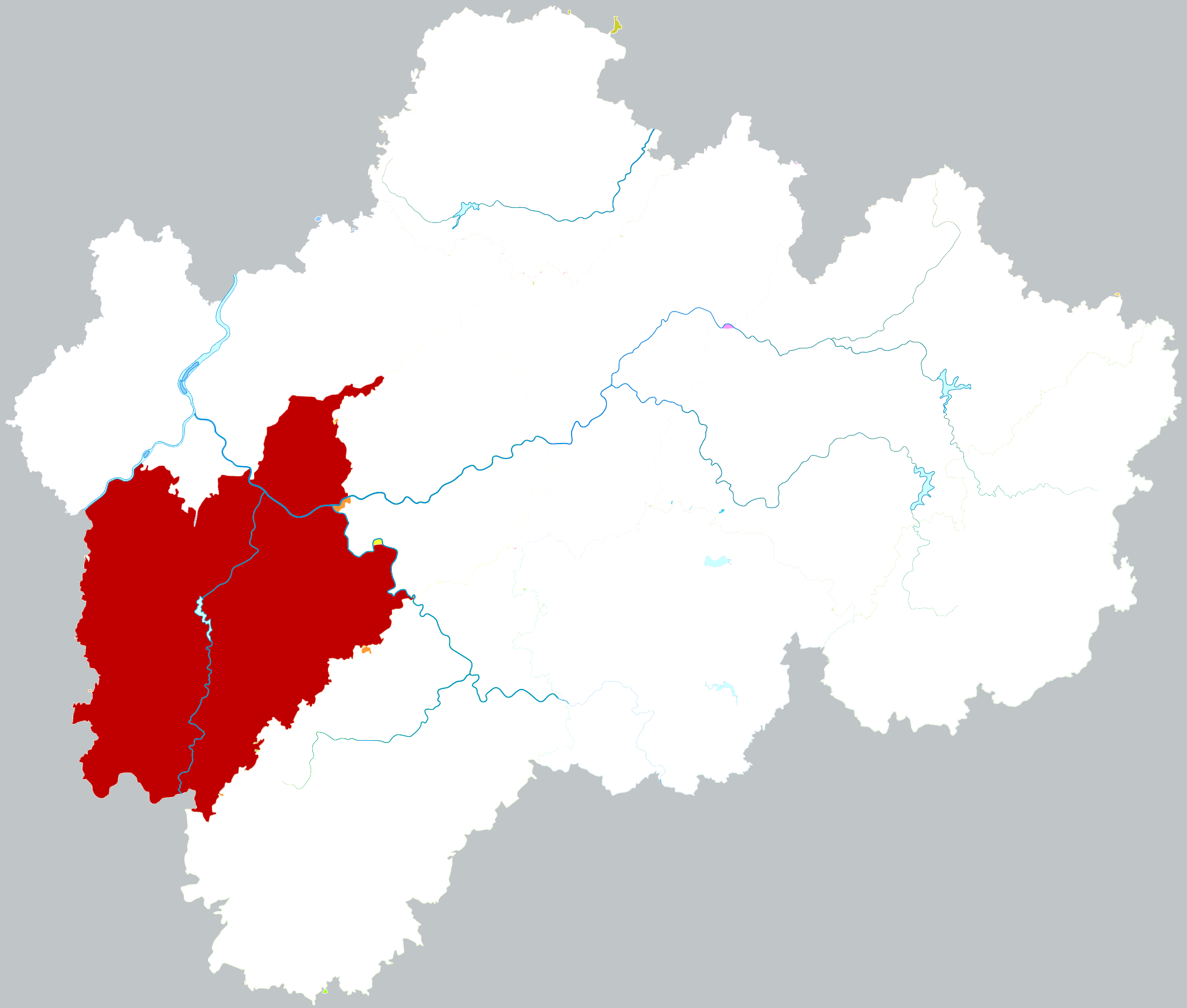
- Location of Wucheng District within Jinhua

- Location in Zhejiang
- Coordinates: 29°05′09″N 119°34′15″E
- Country: People's Republic of China
- Province: Zhejiang
- Prefecture-level city: Jinhua

Area
  - Total: 1,391.24 km^{2} (537.16 sq mi)

Population (2020)
  - Total: 957,055
- Time zone: UTC+8 (China Standard)

Wucheng (Chinese: 婺城; pinyin: Wùchéng) is a district of the city of Jinhua, Zhejiang province, China.

== Administrative divisions ==
Subdistricts:

- Chengdong Subdistrict (城东街道), Chengzhong Subdistrict (城中街道), Chengxi Subdistrict (城西街道), Chengbei Subdistrict (城北街道), Jiangnan Subdistrict (江南街道), Xiguan Subdistrict (西关街道), Qiubin Subdistrict (秋滨街道), Xinshi Subdistrict (新狮街道), Sanjiangkou Subdistrict (三江口街道)

Towns:

- Luodian (罗店镇), Jiangtang (蒋堂镇), Tangxi (汤溪镇), Luobu (罗埠镇), Yafan (雅畈镇), Langya (琅琊镇), Yangbu (洋埠镇), Andi (安地镇), Bailongqiao (白龙桥镇)

Townships:

- Sumeng Township (苏孟乡), Zhuma Township (竹马乡), Qianxi Township (乾西乡), Changshan Township (长山乡), Xinfan Township (莘畈乡), Ruoyang Township (箬阳乡), Shafan Township (沙畈乡), Tashi Township (塔石乡), Lingshang Township (岭上乡)

== See also ==
- Shangjing, a village in Tangxi Town, Wucheng District
