= Bailongqiao =

Bailongqiao Town
- Town

Chinese transcription(s)
  - Simplified: 白龙桥镇
  - Traditional: 白龍橋鎮
  - Pinyin: Báilóngqiáo Zhèn
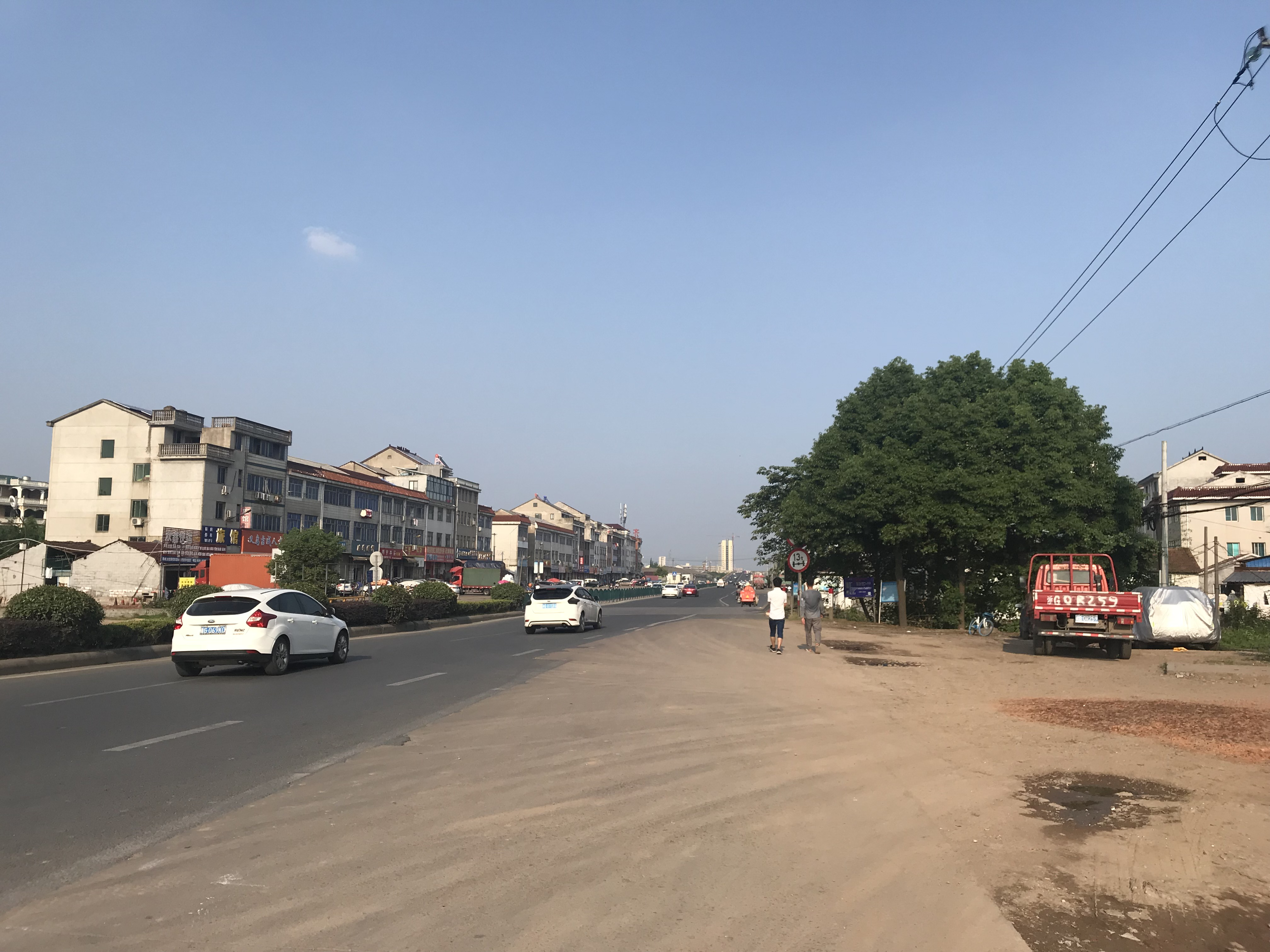
- Yi Village.

- Location in Zhejiang
- Coordinates: 29°04′36″N 119°33′06″E
- Country: China
- Province: Zhejiang
- Prefecture: Jinhua
- District: Wucheng District

Area
  - Total: 86.9 km^{2} (33.6 sq mi)

Population (2017)
  - Total: 72,000
  - Density: 830/km^{2} (2,100/sq mi)
- Time zone: UTC+8 (China Standard)
- Postal code: 321025
- Area code: 0579

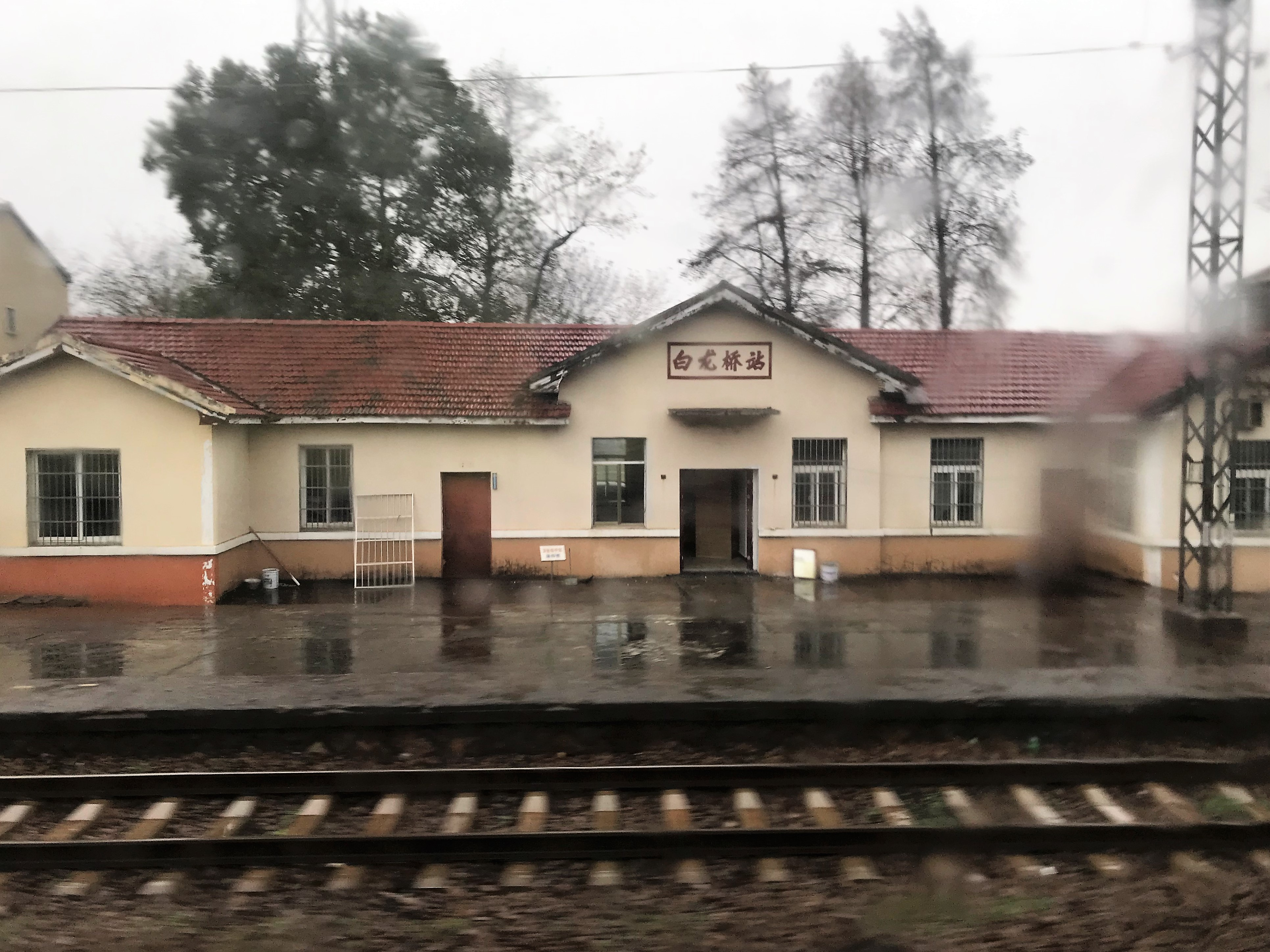
Station Building of Bailongqiao station.

Bailongqiao (Chinese: 白龙桥) is a suburban town in Wucheng District of Jinhua, Zhejiang, China. It is the site of district government. As of the 2017 census it had a population of 72,000 and an area of 86.9-square-kilometre (33.6 sq mi).

== Administrative division ==
As of 2017, the town is divided into 49 villages and 7 communities.

== Geography ==
The Baisha Stream (Chinese: 白沙溪) passes through the town.

== Education ==
- Jinhua No. 10 High School

== Transportation ==
The Bailongqiao railway station serves the town. Zhejiang-Jiangxi railway runs northeast to southwest through the town.

The China National Highway 330, more commonly known as "G330", is a highway passing through the town's downtown, commercial, and industrial area.

The Hangzhou-Jinhua-Quzhou Expressway travels through the town.

== Attractions ==
Bailongqiao Covered Bridge (Chinese: 白龙桥廊桥) is a famous scenic spot in the town.
