= Sumeng Township =

- Town

Chinese transcription(s)
  - Simplified: 苏孟乡
  - Traditional: 蘇孟鄉
  - Pinyin: Sūmèng Xiāng
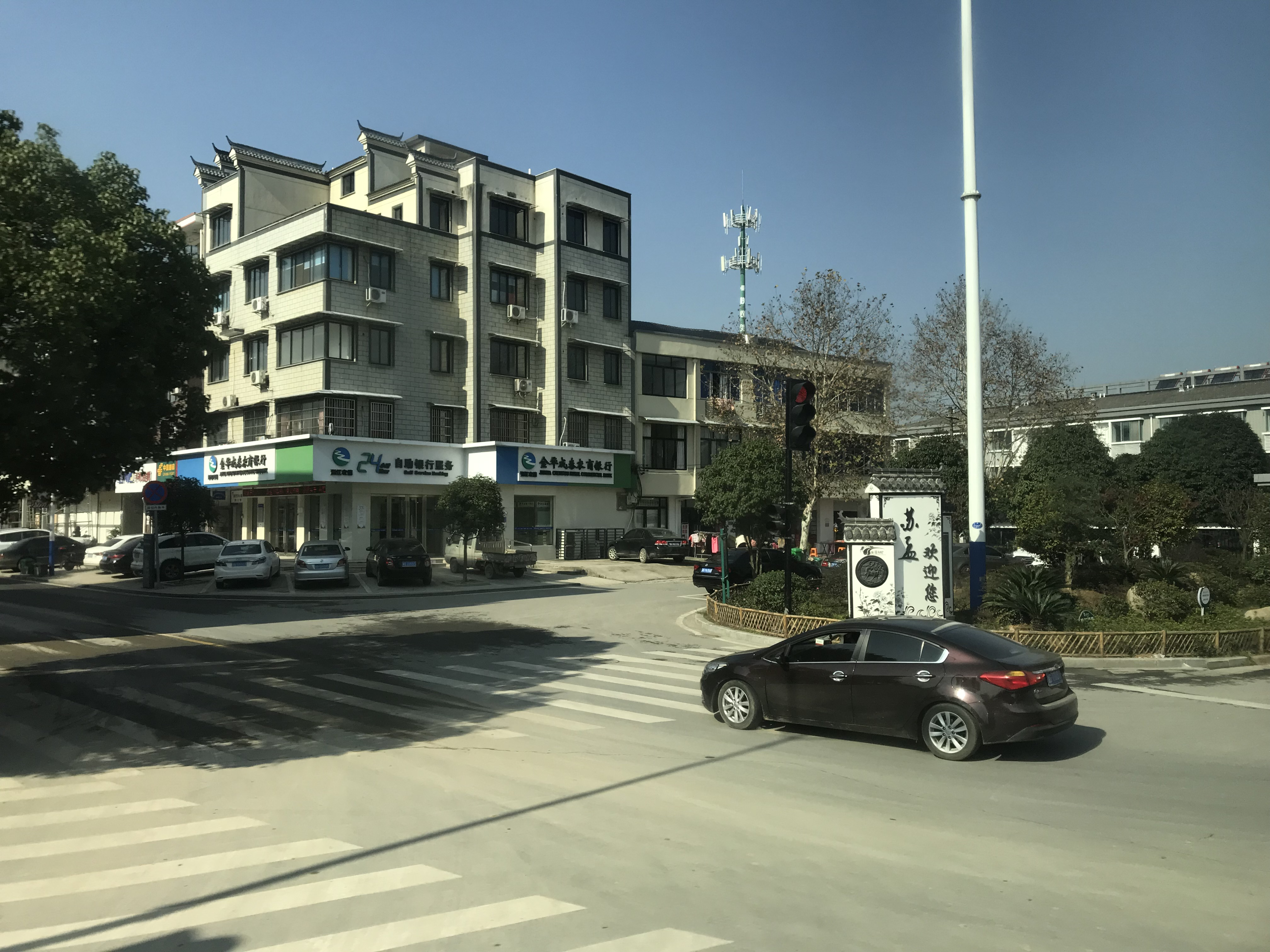
- Sumeng Township.

- Location in Zhejiang
- Coordinates: 29°01′56.64″N 119°38′18.96″E
- Country: China
- Province: Zhejiang
- Prefecture: Jinhua
- District: Wucheng District
- Time zone: UTC+8 (China Standard)
- Postal code: 321017
- Area code: 0579

Sumeng Township (Chinese: 苏孟乡) is a rural town in Wucheng District of Jinhua, eastern China's Zhejiang province. The town shares a border with Changshan Township to the west, Yafan Town to the east, Qiubin Town to the north, and Andi Town to the south.

== History ==
Qinghu Township (Chinese: 清湖乡) was established in 1950. In 1955 Qinghu Township and Qiubin Township (Chinese: 秋滨乡) merged to form Chenghu Township (Chinese: 城湖乡). In 1961 it was renamed "Qinghu Commune" (Chinese: 清湖公社). In 1984 its name was changed into "Sumeng Township".

== Geography ==
The Yuquan Stream (Chinese: 玉泉溪) and Mei Stream (Chinese: 梅溪) pass through the town.

== Economy ==
The local economy is primarily based upon pork and local vegetables.
