= Andi, Zhejiang =

Andi Town
- Town

Chinese transcription(s)
  - Simplified: 安地镇
  - Traditional: 安地鎮
  - Pinyin: Āndì Zhèn
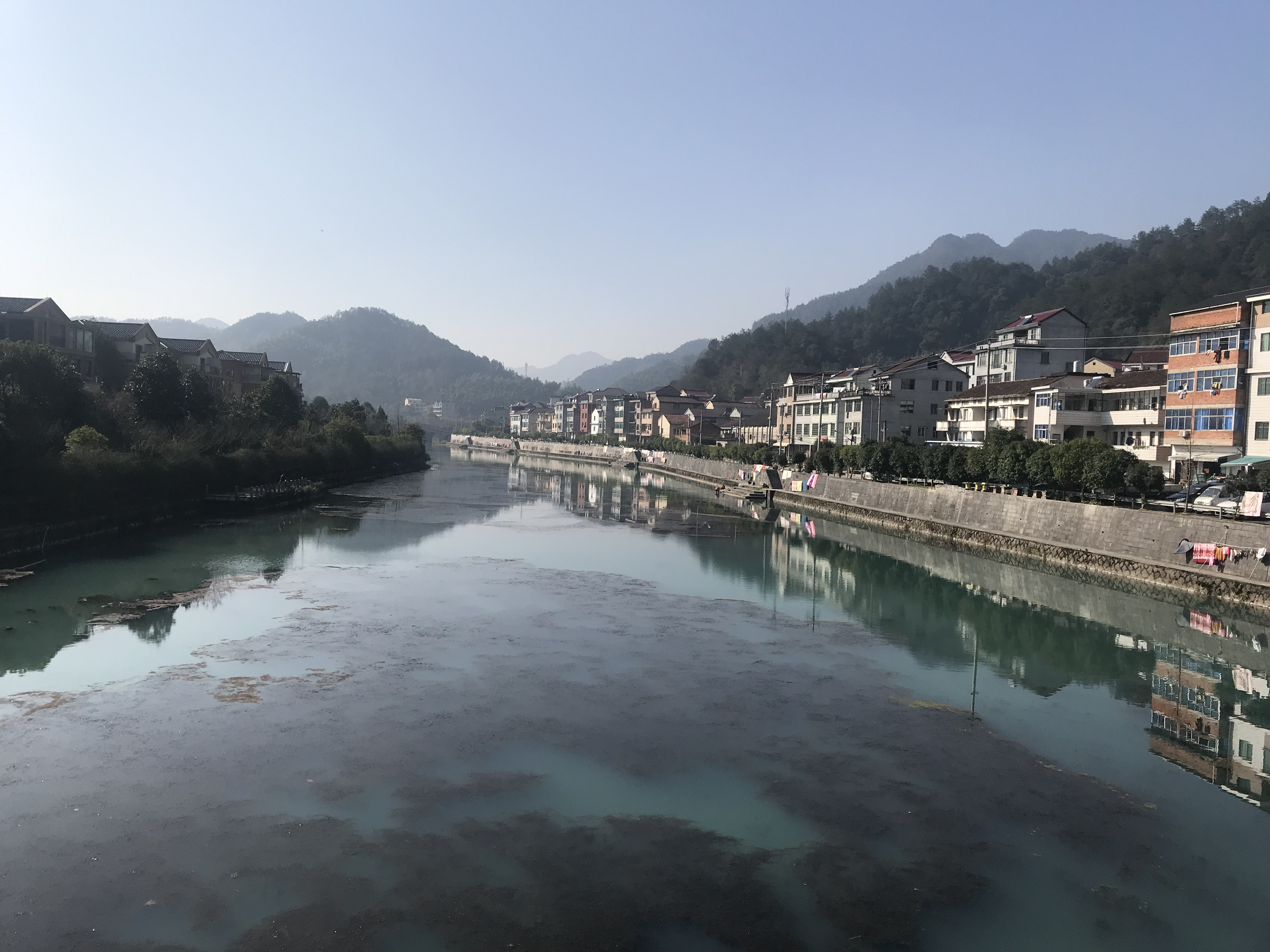
- Residential buildings alongside the Mei Stream.

- Location in Zhejiang
- Coordinates: 28°58′33.96″N 119°38′25.08″E
- Country: China
- Province: Zhejiang
- Prefecture: Jinhua
- District: Wucheng District

Area
  - Total: 130.5 km^{2} (50.4 sq mi)

Population (2017)
  - Total: 15,300
  - Density: 117/km^{2} (304/sq mi)
- Time zone: UTC+8 (China Standard)
- Postal code: 321000
- Area code: 0579

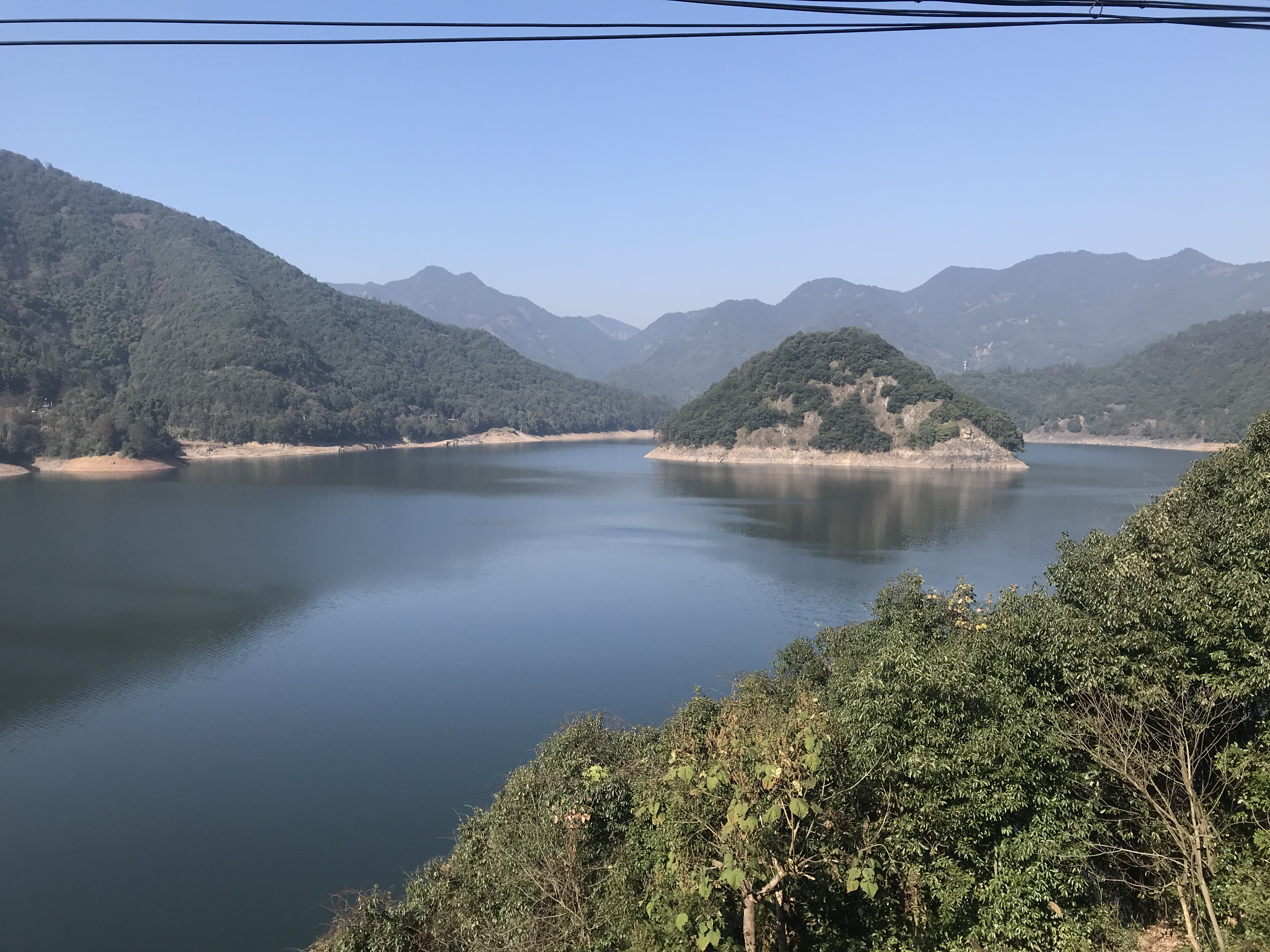
Andi Reservoir.

Andi (Chinese: 安地镇) is a rural town in Wucheng District of Jinhua, eastern China's Zhejiang province. The town is bordered to the north by Sumeng Township, to the east by Yafan Town, to the southeast by Wuyi County, and to the southwest by Liyang Township. It is hailed as the "Hometown of Osmanthus fragrans in China".

== History ==
During the Republic of China, it belonged to Annan District.

In May 1949 it was renamed Andi Township.

In 1961 its name was changed into Andi People's Commune.

In 1992, Andi Township and Waifan Township were merged into one town named "Andi Town".

In March 2017, Yusi Village was listed among the fourth batch of "Beautiful and Livable Villages" by the State Council of China.

== Geography ==
Water resources are abundant here. Mei Stream (Chinese: 梅溪), Longtan Stream (Chinese: 龙潭溪), Waifan Stream (Chinese: 外畈溪), Shanggan Stream (Chinese: 上干溪) and Yagan Stream (Chinese: 雅干溪) are major rivers in the town.

Andi Reservoir is the largest body of water in the town.

== Attractions ==
Andi Reservoir, also known as Xianyuan Lake, is a famous scenic spot.
