= Tangxi, Jinhua =

Tangxi 汤溪镇
- Town
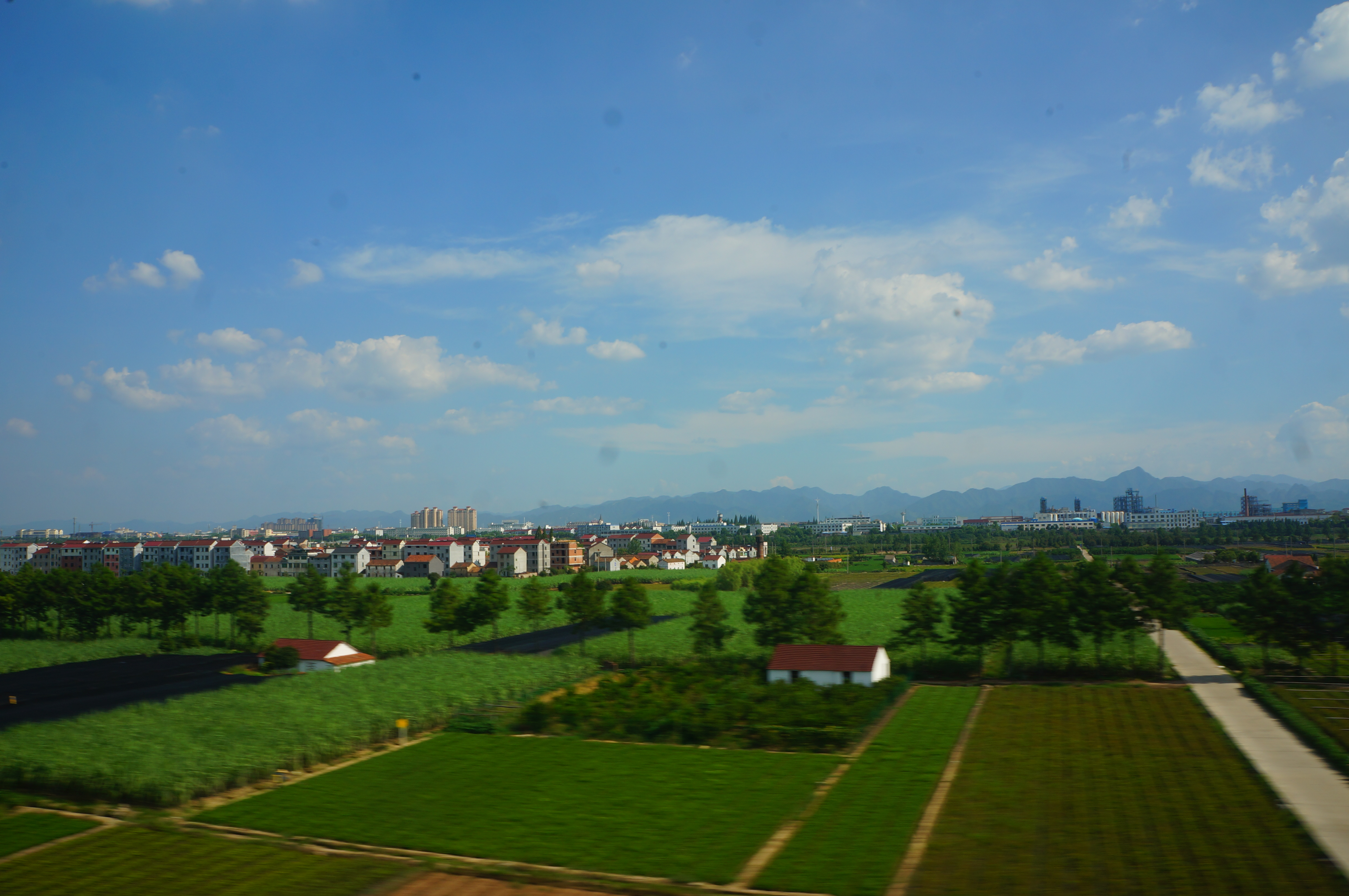
- View of Tangxi Town.

- Location in Zhejiang
- Coordinates: 29°03′20.16″N 119°23′40.92″E
- Country: People's Republic of China
- Province: Zhejiang
- Prefecture-level city: Jinhua
- District: Wucheng

Area
  - Total: 106.82 km^{2} (41.24 sq mi)

Population (2017)
  - Total: 62,900
  - Density: 589/km^{2} (1,530/sq mi)
- Time zone: UTC+08:00 (China Standard)
- Postal code: 321075
- Area code: 0579

Chinese name
- Traditional Chinese: 湯溪鎮
- Simplified Chinese: 汤溪镇
Transcriptions
Standard Mandarin
- Hanyu Pinyin: Tāngxī Zhèn

Tangxi (Chinese: 汤溪镇) is a rural town in Wucheng District of Jinhua, Zhejiang. As of the 2017 census it had a population of 62,900 and an area of 106.82-square-kilometre (41.24 sq mi).

== History ==
The history of Tangxi Town dates back to the Neolithic Age.

During the Spring and Autumn period, Tangxi was under the jurisdiction of the Gumie Kingdom (Chinese: 姑蔑国).

In 222 BC, Qin Shi Huang established Taiwei County (Chinese: 太未县) here. Later its name was changed into Longqiu County (Chinese: 龙丘县).

In 931, during the Five Dynasties and Ten Kingdoms, Qian Liu founded the Wuyue Kingdom, Longqiu County was renamed Longyou County (Chinese: 龙游县).

In 1471, in the 7th year of the Chenghua period of the Ming dynasty, Chenghua Emperor established Tangxi County (Chinese: 汤溪县) here.

During the Guangxu reign of the Qing dynasty, American priest Weng Pixian (Chinese: 翁丕显) came here to spread Catholicism. Then priest Yi Wensi (Chinese: 伊文思) founded a Catholic church here.

On December 28, 1958, Tangxi County was merged into Jinhua County (Chinese: 金华县).

== Geography ==
The highest point in the town is Mount Jiufeng.

== Attractions ==
Tangxi Chenghuang Temple (Chinese: 城隍庙) is a folk temple and provincial level cultural heritage. It was first established in 1472, during the Ming dynasty, the modern temple was founded in 1866, in the late Qing dynasty.

Jiufeng Temple is a Buddhist temple on Mount Jiufeng, it was built in 502, under the Liang dynasty. The present version was completed in the Qianlong period of the Qing dynasty.

== Notable people ==
- Tao Yuanming, poet in the Eastern Jin dynasty.
- Hu Sen (Chinese: 胡森), official in the Ming dynasty.
- Feng Zikai, painter.
- Wei Zuqing (Chinese: 魏祖清), mediciner.

== Gallery ==
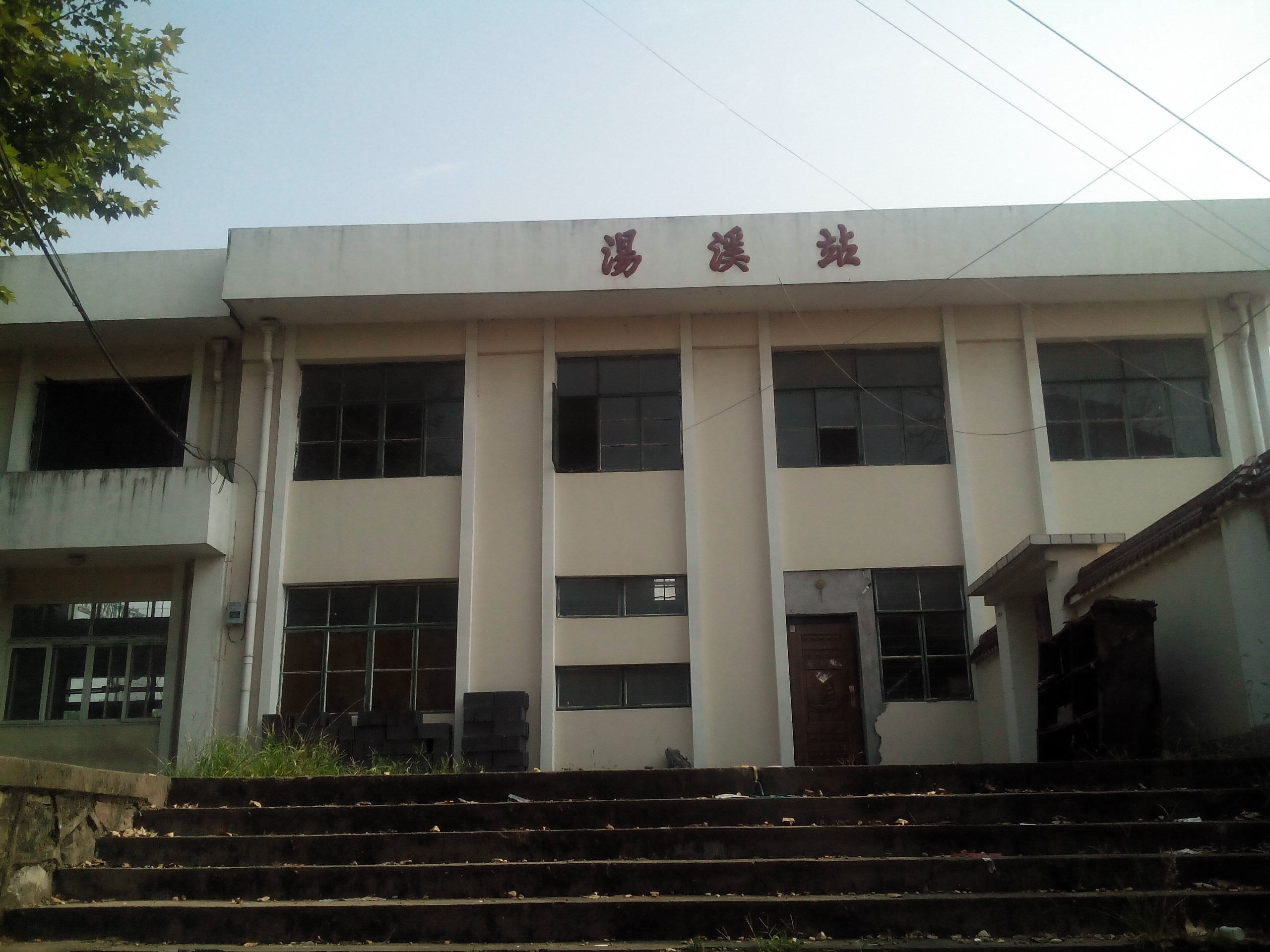
Abandoned Waiting Room of Tangxi Railway station.

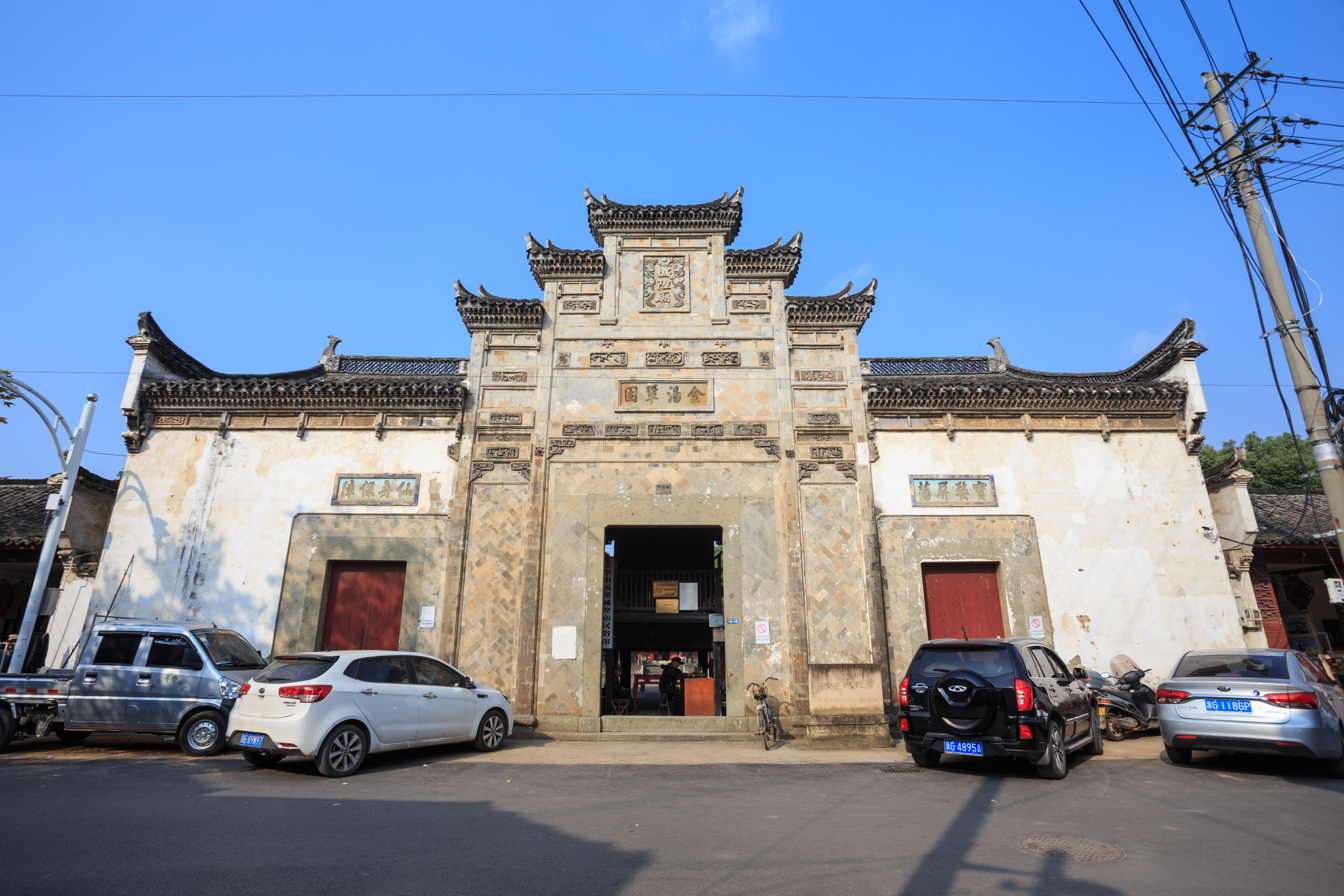
Tangxi Chenghuang Temple.

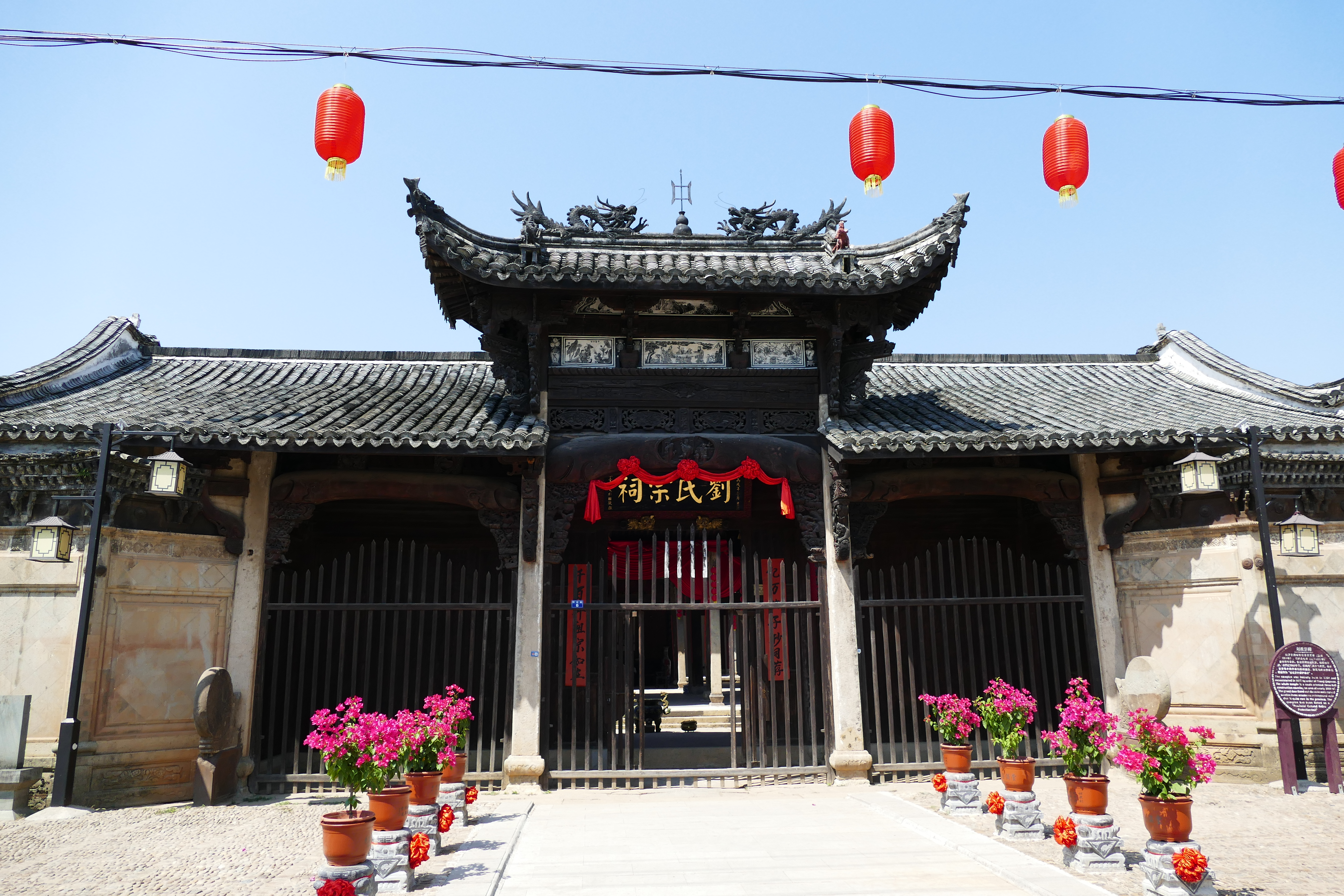
Liu Clan Ancestral Hall.

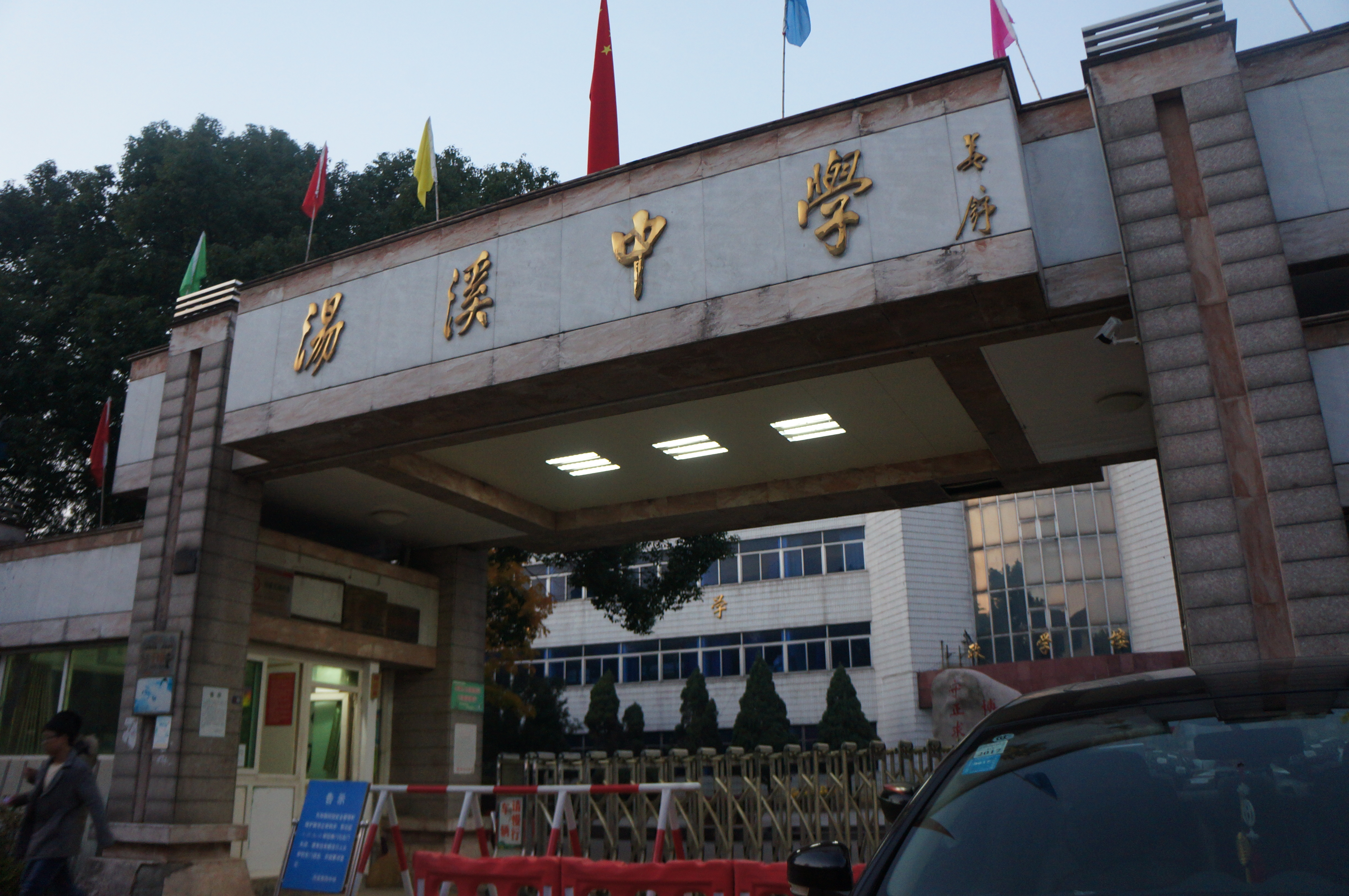
Tangxi High School.
