= List of township-level divisions of Zhejiang =

Location of Zhejiang province in China

This is a list of township-level divisions of the province of Zhejiang, People's Republic of China (PRC). After province, prefecture, and county-level divisions, township-level divisions constitute the formal fourth-level administrative divisions of the PRC. There are a total of 1,356 such divisions in Zhejiang, divided into 375 subdistricts, 670 towns, 293 townships, 4 ethnic towns and 14 ethnic townships, the last two types designated for the She people. This list is divided first into the prefecture-level then the county-level divisions.

== Hangzhou ==
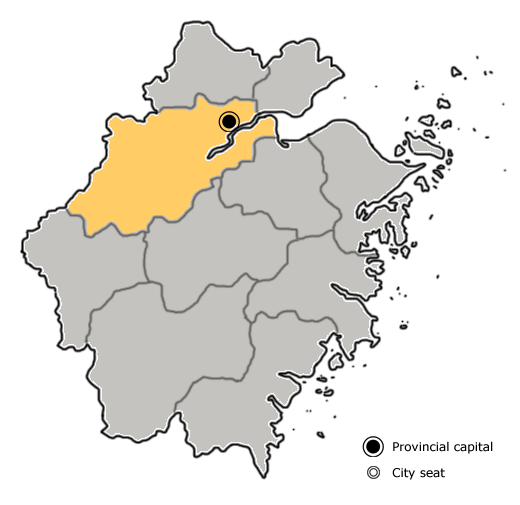
Location of Hangzhou in the province

=== Binjiang District ===
Subdistricts:

- Puyan Subdistrict (浦沿街道), Xixing Subdistrict (西兴街道), Changhe Subdistrict (长河街道)

=== Gongshu District ===
Subdistricts:

- Mishixiang Subdistrict (米市巷街道), Hushu Subdistrict (湖墅街道), Xiaohe Subdistrict (小河街道), Hemu Subdistrict (和睦街道), Hongchenqiao Subdistrict (拱宸桥街道), Daguan Subdistrict (大关街道), Shangtang Subdistrict (上塘街道), Xiangfu Subdistrict (祥符街道)

Towns:

- Kangqiao (康桥镇), Banshan (半山镇)

=== Jianggan District ===
Subdistricts:

- Kaixuan Subdistrict (凯旋街道), Caihe Subdistrict (采荷街道), Zhanongkou Subdistrict (闸弄口街道), Sijiqing Subdistrict (四季青街道), Baiyang Subdistrict (白杨街道), Xiasha Subdistrict (下沙街道)

Towns:

- Jiubao (九堡镇), Pengbu (彭埠镇), Dingqiao (丁桥镇), Jianqiao (笕桥镇)

=== Shangcheng District ===
Subdistricts:

- Qingpo Subdistrict (清波街道), Hubin Subdistrict (湖滨街道), Xiaoying Subdistrict (小营街道), Nanxing Subdistrict (南星街道), Ziyang Subdistrict (紫阳街道), Wangjiang Subdistrict (望江街道)

=== Xiacheng District ===
Subdistricts:

- Wulin Subdistrict (武林街道), Tianshui Subdistrict (天水街道), Chaohui Subdistrict (朝晖街道), Chaoming Subdistrict (潮鸣街道), Changqing Subdistrict (长庆街道), Shiqiao Subdistrict (石桥街道), Dongxin Subdistrict (东新街道), Wenhui Subdistrict (文晖街道)

=== Xiaoshan District ===
Subdistricts:

- Chengxiang Subdistrict (城厢街道), Beigan Subdistrict (北干街道), Shushan Subdistrict (蜀山街道), Xintang Subdistrict (新塘街道)

Towns:

- Louta (楼塔镇), Heshang (河上镇), Daicun (戴村镇), Puyang (浦阳镇), Jinhua (进化镇), Linpu (临浦镇), Yiqiao (义桥镇), Suoqian (所前镇), Yaqian (衙前镇), Wenyan (闻堰镇), Ningwei (宁围镇), Xinjie (新街镇), Kanshan (坎山镇), Guali (瓜沥镇), Dangshan (党山镇), Yinong (益农镇), Jingjiang (靖江镇), Nanyang (南阳镇), Yipeng (义蓬镇), Hezhuang (河庄镇), Dangwan (党湾镇), Xinwan (新湾镇)

=== Xihu District ===
Subdistricts:

- Beishan Subdistrict (北山街道), Lingyin Subdistrict (灵隐街道), Xixi Subdistrict (西溪街道), Cuiyuan Subdistrict (翠苑街道), Wenxin Subdistrict (文新街道), Gudang Subdistrict (古荡街道), Xihu Subdistrict (西湖街道), Zhuantang Subdistrict (转塘街道), Jiangcun Subdistrict (蒋村街道), Liuxia Subdistrict (留下街道)

Towns:

- Shuangpu (双浦镇), Sandun (三墩镇)

=== Yuhang District ===
Subdistricts:

- Linping Subdistrict (临平街道), Nanyuan Subdistrict (南苑街道), Donghu Subdistrict (东湖街道), Xingqiao Subdistrict (星桥街道), Qiaosi Subdistrict (乔司街道), Yunhe Subdistrict (运河街道), Renhe Subdistrict (仁和街道), Chongxian Subdistrict (崇贤街道), Liangzhu Subdistrict (良渚街道), Wuchang Subdistrict (五常街道), Yuhang Subdistrict (余杭街道), Xianlin Subdistrict (闲林街道), Cangqian Subdistrict (仓前街道), Zhongtai Subdistrict (中泰街道)

Towns:

- Tangxi (塘栖镇), Pingyao (瓶窑镇), Jingshan (径山镇), Luniao (鸬鸟镇), Huanghu (黄湖镇), Baizhang (百丈镇)

=== Fuyang District ===
Subdistricts:

- Fuchun Subdistrict (富春街道), Dongzhou Subdistrict (东洲街道), Chunjiang Subdistrict (春江街道), Lushan Subdistrict (鹿山街道)

Towns:

- Gaoqiao (高桥镇), Shoujiang (受降镇), Changkou (场口镇), Chang'an (常安镇), Wanshi (万市镇), Dongqiao (洞桥镇), Xukou (胥口镇), Xindeng (新登镇), Luzhu (渌渚镇), Lingqiao (灵桥镇), Dayuan (大源镇), Changlü (常绿镇), Longmen (龙门镇), Lishan (里山镇), Yongchang (永昌镇)

=== Lin'an District ===
Subdistricts:

- Jincheng Subdistrict (锦城街道), Linglong Subdistrict (玲珑街道), Shanggan Subdistrict (上甘街道), Qingshanhu Subdistrict (青山湖街道), Jinbei Subdistrict (锦北街道)

Towns:

- Banqiao (板桥镇), Gaohong (高虹镇), Taihu (太湖镇), Yuqian (於潜镇), Tianmushan (天目山镇), Taiyang (太阳镇), Qianchuan (潜川镇), Changhua (昌化镇), Longgang (龙岗镇), Heqiao (河桥镇), Tuankou (湍口镇), Qingliangfeng (清凉峰镇), Daoshi (岛石镇)

Townships:

- Huanshan Township (环山乡), Huyuan Township (湖源乡), Shangguan Township (上官乡), Yushan Township (渔山乡), Chunjian Township (春建乡), Xintong Township (新桐乡)

=== Jiande City ===
Subdistricts:

- Yangxi Subdistrict (洋溪街道), Genglou Subdistrict (更楼街道), Xin'anjiang Subdistrict (新安江街道)

Towns:

- Meicheng (梅城镇), Xiaya (下涯镇), Yangcunqiao (杨村桥镇), Qiantan (乾潭镇), Sandu (三都镇), Shouchang (寿昌镇), Datong (大同镇), Hangtou (航头镇), Lijia (李家镇), Dayang (大洋镇), Lianhua (莲花镇), Daciyan (大慈岩镇)

The only township is Qintang Township (钦堂乡)

=== Chun'an County ===
Towns:

- Qiandaohu (千岛湖镇), Wenchang (文昌镇), Shilin (石林镇), Linqi (临岐镇), Weiping (威坪镇), Jiangjia (姜家镇), Zitong (梓桐镇), Fenkou (汾口镇), Zhongzhou (中洲镇), Dashu (大墅镇), Fengshuling (枫树岭镇)

Townships:

- Lishang Township (里商乡), Jinfeng Township (金峰乡), Fuwen Township (富文乡), Zuokou Township (左口乡), Pingmen Township (屏门乡), Yaoshan Township (瑶山乡), Wangbu Township (王阜乡), Songcun Township (宋村乡), Jiukeng Township (鸠坑乡), Langchuan Township (浪川乡), Jieshou Township (界首乡), Anyang Township (安阳乡)

=== Tonglu County ===
Subdistricts:

- Tongjun Subdistrict (桐君街道), Jiuxian Subdistrict (旧县街道)

Towns:

- Fuchunjiang (富春江镇), Hengcun (横村镇), Fenshui (分水镇), Fengchuan (凤川镇), Baijiang (百江镇), Yaolin (瑶琳镇), Jiangnan (江南镇)

Townships:

- Zhongshan Township (钟山乡), Xinhe Township (新合乡), Hecun Township (合村乡), Eshan She Ethnic Township (莪山畲族乡)

== Ningbo ==
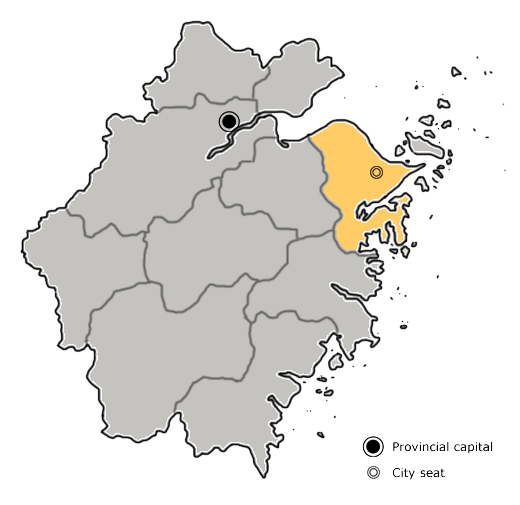
Location of Ningbo in the province

=== Beilun District ===
Subdistricts:

- Xinqi Subdistrict (新碶街道), Chaiqiao Subdistrict (柴桥街道), Daqi Subdistrict (大碶街道), Daxie Subdistrict (大榭街道), Qijiashan Subdistrict (戚家山街道), Xiaogang Subdistrict (小港街道), Xiapu Subdistrict (霞浦街道)

Towns:

- Baifeng (白峰镇), Chunxiao (春晓镇)

The only township is Meishan Township (梅山乡)

=== Haishu District ===
Subdistricts:

- Jiangxia Subdistrict (江厦街道), Baiyun Subdistrict (白云街道), Duantang Subdistrict (段塘街道), Gulou Subdistrict (鼓楼街道), Nanmen Subdistrict (南门街道), Wangchun Subdistrict (望春街道), Ximen Subdistrict (西门街道), Yuehu Subdistrict (月湖街道)

=== Jiangbei District ===
Subdistricts:

- Zhongma Subdistrict (中马街道), Baisha Subdistrict (白沙街道), Hongtang Subdistrict (洪塘街道), Kongpu Subdistrict (孔浦街道), Wenjiao Subdistrict (文教街道), Yongjiang Subdistrict (甬江街道), Zhuangqiao Subdistrict (庄桥街道)

The only town is Cicheng (慈城镇)

=== Jiangdong District ===
Subdistricts:

- Baizhang Subdistrict (百丈街道), Baihe Subdistrict (白鹤街道), Dongjiao Subdistrict (东郊街道), Dongliu Subdistrict (东柳街道), Dongsheng Subdistrict (东胜街道), Fuming Subdistrict (福明街道), Minglou Subdistrict (明楼街道), Xinming Subdistrict (新明街道)

=== Yinzhou District ===
Subdistricts:

- Shounan Subdistrict (首南街道), Meixu Subdistrict (梅墟街道), Shiqi Subdistrict (石碶街道), Xiaying Subdistrict (下应街道), Zhonggongmiao Subdistrict (钟公庙街道), Zhonghe Subdistrict (中河街道)

Towns:

- Dongqianhu (东钱湖镇), Dongqiao (洞桥镇), Dongwu (东吴镇), Gulin (古林镇), Gaoqiao (高桥镇), Hengxi (横溪镇), Hengjie (横街镇), Jitugang (集士港镇), Jiangshan (姜山镇), Qiu'ai (邱隘镇), Tangxi (塘溪镇), Wuxiang (五乡镇), Xianxiang (咸祥镇), Yinjiang (鄞江镇), Yunlong (云龙镇), Zhanqi (瞻岐镇), Zhangshui (章水镇)

The only township is Longguan Township (龙观乡)

=== Zhenhai District ===
Subdistricts:

- Zhaobaoshan Subdistrict (招宝山街道), Jiaochuan Subdistrict (蛟川街道), Luotuo Subdistrict (骆驼街道), Zhuangshi Subdistrict (庄市街道)

Towns:

- Jiulonghu (九龙湖镇), Xiepu (澥浦镇)

=== Cixi City ===
Subdistricts:

- Baisha Road Subdistrict (白沙路街道), Gutang Subdistrict (古塘街道), Hushan Subdistrict (浒山街道), Kandun Subdistrict (坎墩街道), Zonghan Subdistrict (宗汉街道)

Towns:

- Andong (庵东镇), Changhe (长河镇), Chongshou (崇寿镇), Fuhai (附海镇), Guanhaiwei (观海卫镇), Henghe (横河镇), Kuangyan (匡堰镇), Longshan (龙山镇), Qiaotou (桥头镇), Shengshan (胜山镇), Tianyuan (天元镇), Xiaolin (逍林镇), Xinpu (新浦镇), Zhangqi (掌起镇), Zhouxiang (周巷镇)

=== Fenghua ===
Six subdistricts:

- Jinping Subdistrict (锦屏街道), Jiangkou Subdistrict (江口街道), Xiwu Subdistrict (西坞街道), Xiaowangmiao Subdistrict (萧王庙街道), Yuelin Subdistrict (岳林街道) Fangqiao Subdistrict (方桥街道)

Six towns:

- Chunhu (莼湖镇), Dayan (大堰镇), Qiucun (裘村镇), Song'ao (松岙镇), Shangtian (尚田镇), Xikou (溪口镇)

=== Yuyao ===
Subdistricts:

- Lanjiang Subdistrict (兰江街道), Ditang Subdistrict (低塘街道), Fengshan Subdistrict (凤山街道), Langxia Subdistrict (朗霞街道), Lizhou Subdistrict (梨洲街道), Yangming Subdistrict (阳明街道)

Towns:

- Dalan (大岚镇), Dayin (大隐镇), Huangjiabu (黄家埠镇), Hemudu (河姆渡镇), Lubu (陆埠镇), Liangnong (梁弄镇), Linshan (临山镇), Mushan (牟山镇), Mazhu (马渚镇), Simingshan (四明山镇), Simen (泗门镇), Sanqishi (三七市镇), Xiaocao'e (小曹娥镇), Zhangting (丈亭镇)

The only township is Luting Township (鹿亭乡)

=== Ninghai County ===
Subdistricts:

- Yuelong Subdistrict (跃龙街道), Meilin Subdistrict (梅林街道), Qiaotouhu Subdistrict (桥头胡街道), Taoyuan Subdistrict (桃源街道)

Towns:

- Changjie (长街镇), Chalu (岔路镇), Dajiahe (大佳何镇), Huangtan (黄坛镇), Liyang (力洋镇), Qiangjiao (强蛟镇), Qiantong (前童镇), Shenquan (深甽镇), Sangzhou (桑洲镇), Xidian (西店镇), Yishi (一市镇)

Townships:

- Chayuan Township (茶院乡), Huchen Township (胡陈乡), Yuexi Township (越溪乡)

=== Xiangshan County ===
Subdistricts:

- Dandong Subdistrict (丹东街道), Danxi Subdistrict (丹西街道), Juexi Subdistrict (爵溪街道)

Towns:

- Dingtang (定塘镇), Daxu (大徐镇), Hepu (鹤浦镇), Qiangtou (墙头镇), Shipu (石浦镇), Sizhoutou (泗洲头镇), Tuci (涂茨镇), Xinqiao (新桥镇), Xianyang (贤庠镇), Xizhou (西周镇)

Townships:

- Dongchen Township (东陈乡), Gaotangdao Township (高塘岛乡), Huangbi'ao Township (黄避岙乡), Maoyang Township (茅洋乡), Xiaotang Township (晓塘乡)

== Huzhou ==
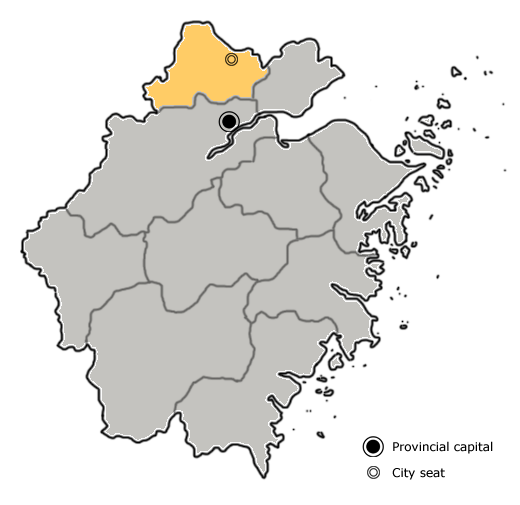
Location of Huzhou in the province

=== Nanxun District ===
Towns:

- Nanxun Town (南浔镇), Lianshi (练市镇), Shuanglin (双林镇), Shanlian (善琏镇), Jiuguan (旧馆镇), Linghu (菱湖镇), Hefu (和孚镇), Qianjin (千金镇), Shicong (石淙镇)

=== Wuxing District ===
Subdistricts:

- Yuehe Subdistrict (月河街道), Chaoyang Subdistrict (朝阳街道), Aishan Subdistrict (爱山街道), Feiying Subdistrict (飞英街道), Longquan Subdistrict (龙泉街道), Fenghuang Subdistrict (凤凰街道), Kangshan Subdistrict (康山街道), Renhuangshan Subdistrict (仁皇山街道), Binhu Subdistrict (滨湖街道)

Towns:

- Balidian (八里店镇), Zhili (织里镇), Miaoxi (妙西镇), Daixi (埭溪镇), Donglin (东林镇), Yangjiabu (杨家埠镇)

Townships:

- Daochang Township (道场乡), Huanzhu Township (环渚乡)

=== Anji County ===
Towns:

- Dipu (递铺镇), Xiaofeng (孝丰镇), Meixi (梅溪镇), Baofu (报福镇), Hanggai (杭垓镇), Liangpeng (良朋镇), Gaoyu (高禹镇), Zhangcun (章村镇), Tianhuangping (天荒坪镇), Zhangwu (鄣吴镇)

Townships:

- Kuntong Township (昆铜乡), Xilong Township (溪龙乡), Guishan Township (皈山乡), Shangshu Township (上墅乡), Shanchuan Township (山川乡)

=== Changxing County ===
Towns:

- Zhicheng, Changxing (雉城镇), Hongqiao, Changxing (洪桥镇), Lincheng, Changxing (林城镇), Si'an (泗安镇), Xiaopu, Changxing (小浦镇), Heping, Changxing (和平镇), Meishan, Changxing (煤山镇), Jiapu (夹浦镇), Hongxingqiao (虹星桥镇), Lijiaxiang (李家巷镇)

Townships:

- Shuikou Township (水口乡), Lüshan Township (吕山乡), Wushan Township (吴山乡), Baixian Township (白岘乡), Huaikan Township (槐坎乡), Erjieling Township (二界岭乡)

=== Deqing County ===
Towns:

- Wukang (武康镇), Qianyuan (乾元镇), Xinshi (新市镇), Luoshe (洛舍镇), Xin'an (新安镇), Leidian (雷甸镇), Zhongguan (钟管镇), Yuyue (禹越镇), Moganshan (莫干山镇)

== Jiaxing ==
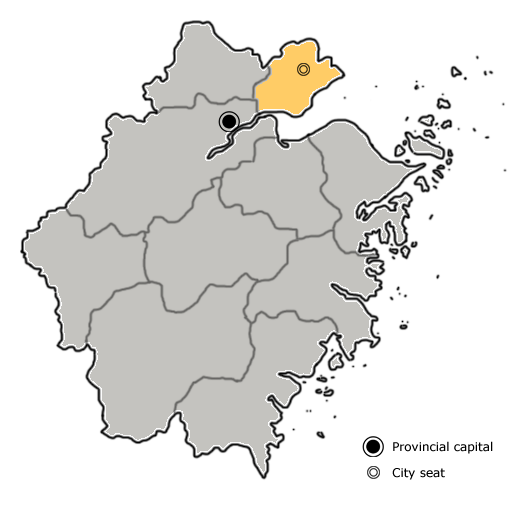
Location of Jiaxing in the province

=== Nanhu District ===
Subdistricts:

- Jianshe Subdistrict (建设街道), Nanhu Subdistrict (南湖街道), Xinxing Subdistrict (新兴街道), Xinjia Subdistrict (新嘉街道), Jiefang Subdistrict (解放街道), Dongshan Subdistrict (东栅街道), Chengnan Subdistrict (城南街道), Changshui Subdistrict (长水街道)

Towns:

- Xinfeng (新丰镇), Fengqiao (凤桥镇), Yuxin (余新镇), Daqiao (大桥镇), Qixing (七星镇)

=== Xiuzhou District ===
Subdistricts:

- Xincheng Subdistrict (新城街道), Jiabei Subdistrict (嘉北街道), Tanghui Subdistrict (塘汇街道), Gaozhao Subdistrict (高照街道)

Towns:

- Wangjiangjing (王江泾镇), Wangdian (王店镇), Xincheng (新塍镇), Honghe (洪合镇), Youchegang (油车港镇)

=== Haining ===
Subdistricts:

- Xiashi Subdistrict (硖石街道), Haizhou Subdistrict (海洲街道), Haichang Subdistrict (海昌街道), Maqiao Subdistrict (马桥街道)

Towns:

- Xucun (许村镇), Chang'an (长安镇), Yanguan (盐官镇), Xieqiao (斜桥镇), Yuanhua (袁花镇), Dingqiao (丁桥镇), Huangwan (黄湾镇), Zhouwangmiao (周王庙镇)

=== Pinghu ===
Subdistricts:

- Danghu Subdistrict (当湖街道), Zhongdai Subdistrict (钟埭街道), Caoqiao Subdistrict (曹桥街道)

Towns:

- Zhapu (乍浦镇), Xindai (新埭镇), Xincang (新仓镇), Quantang (全塘镇), Huanggu (黄姑镇), Guangchen (广陈镇), Lindai (林埭镇)

=== Tongxiang ===
Subdistricts:

- Wutong Subdistrict (梧桐街道), Fengming Subdistrict (凤鸣街道), Longxiang Subdistrict (龙翔街道)

Towns:

- Puyuan (濮院镇), Tudian (屠甸镇), Gaoqiao (高桥镇), Heshan (河山镇), Wuzhen (乌镇镇), Shimen (石门镇), Dama (大麻镇), Chongfu (崇福镇), Zhouquan (洲泉镇)

=== Haiyan County ===
Subdistricts:

- Wuyuan Subdistrict (武原街道), Qinshan Subdistrict (秦山街道), Xitangqiao Subdistrict (西塘桥街道), Yuantong Subdistrict (元通街道)

Towns:

- Shendang (沈荡镇), Tongyuan (通元镇), Chepu (澉浦镇), Yucheng (于城镇), Baibu (百步镇)

=== Jiashan County ===
Subdistricts:

- Weitang Subdistrict (魏塘街道), Luoxing Subdistrict (罗星街道), Huimin Subdistrict (惠民街道)

Towns:

- Taozhuang (陶庄镇), Tianning (天凝镇), Xitang (西塘镇), Ganyao (干窑镇), Dayun (大云镇), Yaozhuang (姚庄镇)

== Jinhua ==
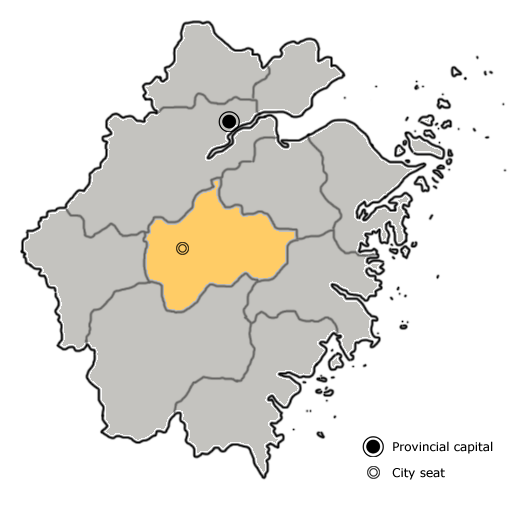
Location of Jinhua in the province

=== Jindong District ===
Subdistricts:

- Duohu Subdistrict (多湖街道), Dongxiao Subdistrict (东孝街道)

Towns:

- Xiaoshun (孝顺镇), Fucun (傅村镇), Caozhai (曹宅镇), Lipu (澧浦镇), Lingxia (岭下镇), Jiangdong (江东镇), Tangya (塘雅镇), Chisong (赤松镇)

The only township is Yuandong Township (源东乡)

=== Wucheng District ===
Subdistricts:

- Chengdong Subdistrict (城东街道), Chengzhong Subdistrict (城中街道), Chengxi Subdistrict (城西街道), Chengbei Subdistrict (城北街道), Jiangnan Subdistrict (江南街道), Xiguan Subdistrict (西关街道), Qiubin Subdistrict (秋滨街道), Xinshi Subdistrict (新狮街道), Sanjiangkou Subdistrict (三江口街道)

Towns:

- Luodian (罗店镇), Jiangtang (蒋堂镇), Tangxi (汤溪镇), Luobu (罗埠镇), Yafan (雅畈镇), Langya (琅琊镇), Yangbu (洋埠镇), Andi (安地镇), Bailongqiao (白龙桥镇)

Townships:

- Sumeng Township (苏孟乡), Zhuma Township (竹马乡), Qianxi Township (乾西乡), Changshan Township (长山乡), Xinfan Township (莘畈乡), Ruoyang Township (箬阳乡), Shafan Township (沙畈乡), Tashi Township (塔石乡), Lingshang Township (岭上乡)

=== Dongyang ===
Subdistricts:

- Wuning Subdistrict (吴宁街道), Nanshi Subdistrict (南市街道), Baiyun Subdistrict (白云街道), Jiangbei Subdistrict (江北街道), Chengdong Subdistrict (城东街道), Liushi Subdistrict (六石街道)

Towns:

- Weishan (巍山镇), Hulu (虎鹿镇), Geshan (歌山镇), Zuocun (佐村镇), Dongyangjiang (东阳江镇), Huxi (湖溪镇), Mazhai (马宅镇), Qianxiang (千祥镇), Nanma (南马镇), Huashui (画水镇), Hengdian (横店镇)

The only township is Sandan Township (三单乡)

=== Lanxi ===
Subdistricts:

- Yunshan Subdistrict (云山街道), Lanjiang Subdistrict (兰江街道), Shanghua Subdistrict (上华街道), Yongchang Subdistrict (永昌街道), Chixi Subdistrict (赤溪街道), Nübu Subdistrict (女埠街道)

Towns:

- Youbu (游埠镇), Zhuge (诸葛镇), Majian (马涧镇), Xiangxi (香溪镇), Huangdian (黄店镇), Meijiang (梅江镇)

Townships:

- Baishe Township (柏社乡), Lingdong Township (灵洞乡), Shuiting She Ethnic Township (水亭畲族乡)

=== Yiwu ===
Subdistricts:

- Choushan Subdistrict (稠城街道), Beiyuan Subdistrict (北苑街道), Choujiang Subdistrict (稠江街道), Jiangdong Subdistrict (江东街道), Houzhai Subdistrict (后宅街道), Chengxi Subdistrict (城西街道), Niansanli Subdistrict (廿三里街道)

Towns:

- Shangxi (上溪镇), Yiting (义亭镇), Fotang (佛堂镇), Chi'an (赤岸镇), Suxi (苏溪镇), Dachen (大陈镇)

=== Yongkang ===
Subdistricts:

- Dongcheng Subdistrict (东城街道), Xicheng Subdistrict (西城街道), Jiangnan Subdistrict (江南街道)

Towns:

- Zhiying (芝英镇), Shizhu (石柱镇), Gushan (古山镇), Xiangzhu (象珠镇), Longshan (龙山镇), Huajie (花街镇), Qiancang (前仓镇), Zhoushan (舟山镇), Fangyan (方岩镇), Xixi (西溪镇), Tangxuan (唐先镇)

=== Pan'an County ===
Towns:

- Anwen (安文镇), Shanghu (尚湖镇), Fangqian (方前镇), Xinwo (新渥镇), Jianshan (尖山镇), Yushan (玉山镇), Renchuan (仁川镇), Dapan (大盘镇), Lengshui (冷水镇)

Townships:

- Huzhai Township (胡宅乡), Yaochuan Township (窈川乡), Shuangxi Township (双溪乡), Shenze Township (深泽乡), Shuangfeng Township (双峰乡), Panfeng Township (盘峰乡), Weixin Township (维新乡), Gao'er Township (高二乡), Jiuhe Township (九和乡), Wancang Township (万苍乡)

=== Pujiang County ===
Subdistricts:

- Punan Subdistrict (浦南街道), Xianhua Subdistrict (仙华街道), Puyang Subdistrict (浦阳街道)

Towns:

- Huangzhai (黄宅镇), Yantou (岩头镇), Zhengzhai (郑宅镇), Tanxi (檀溪镇), Hangping (杭坪镇), Baima (白马镇), Zhengjiawu (郑家坞镇)

Townships:

- Yuzhai Township (虞宅乡), Dafan Township (大畈乡), Zhongyu Township (中余乡), Qianwu Township (前吴乡), Huaqiao Township (花桥乡)

=== Wuyi County ===
Subdistricts:

- Baiyang Subdistrict (白洋街道), Hushan Subdistrict (壶山街道), Shuxi Subdistrict (熟溪街道)

Towns:

- Lütan (履坦镇), Tongqin (桐琴镇), Wangzhai (王宅镇), Taoxi (桃溪镇), Quanxi (泉溪镇), Xinzhai (新宅镇), Jiaodao (茭道镇), Liucheng She Ethnic Town (柳城畲族镇)

Townships:

- Datian Township (大田乡), Baimu Township (白姆乡), Yuyuan Township (俞源乡), Tanhong Township (坦洪乡), Xilian Township (西联乡), Sangang Township (三港乡), Daxikou Township (大溪口乡)

== Lishui ==
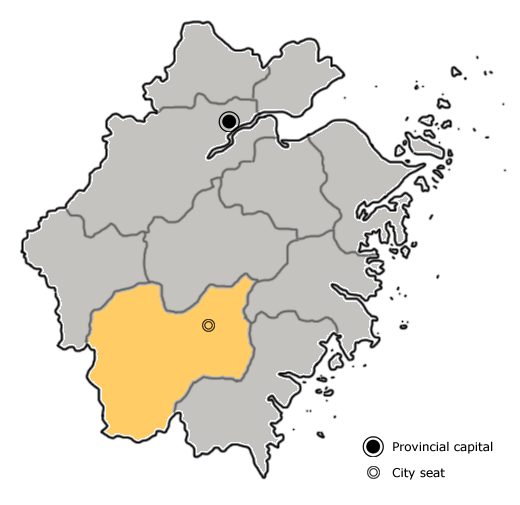
Location of Lishui in the province

=== Liandu District ===
Subdistricts:

- Zijin Subdistrict (紫金街道), Yanquan Subdistrict (岩泉街道), Wanxiang Subdistrict (万象街道), Baiyun Subdistrict (白云街道), Shuige Subdistrict (水阁街道), Fuling Subdistrict (富岭街道)

Towns:

- Bihu (碧湖镇), Liancheng (联城镇), Dagangtou (大港头镇), Shuangxi (双溪镇), Laozhu She Ethnic Town (老竹畲族镇)

Townships:

- Taiping Township (太平乡), Xiandu Township (仙渡乡), Fengyuan Township (峰源乡), Gaoxi Township (高溪乡), Shuanghuang Township (双黄乡), Huangcun Township (黄村乡), Lixin She Ethnic Township (丽新畲族乡)

=== Longquan ===
Subdistricts:

- Longyuan Subdistrict (龙渊街道), Xijie Subdistrict (西街街道), Jianchi Subdistrict (剑池街道)

Towns:

- Badu (八都镇), Shangyang (上垟镇), Xiaomei (小梅镇), Chatian (查田镇), Pingnan (屏南镇), Anren (安仁镇), Jinxi (锦溪镇), Zhulong (住龙镇)

Townships:

- Lanju Township (兰巨乡), Dashi Township (跶石乡), Baoxi Township (宝溪乡), Longnan Township (龙南乡), Daotai Township (道太乡), Yanzhang Township (岩樟乡), Chengbei Township (城北乡), Zhuyang She Ethnic Township (竹垟畲族乡)

=== Jingning She Autonomous County ===
Towns:

- Hexi (鹤溪镇), Yingchuan (英川镇), Bohai (渤海镇), Dongkeng (东坑镇), Shawan (沙湾镇)

Townships:

- Jiulong Township (九龙乡), Jingnan Township (景南乡), Chengzhao Township (澄照乡), Maoyang Township (毛垟乡), Qiulu Township (秋炉乡), Dadi Township (大地乡), Meiqi Township (梅岐乡), Zhengkeng Township (郑坑乡), Geshan Township (葛山乡), Dajun Township (大均乡), Wutong Township (梧桐乡), Daji Township (大漈乡), Biaoxi Township (标溪乡), Jiadi Township (家地乡), Luci Township (鸬鹚乡), Yanxi Township (雁溪乡)

=== Jinyun County ===
Towns:

- Wuyun (五云镇), Huzhen (壶镇镇), Xinjian (新建镇), Shuhong (舒洪镇), Dayuan (大源镇), Dongdu (东渡镇), Dongfang (东方镇), Dayang (大洋镇)

Townships:

- Rongjiang Township (溶江乡), Qili Township (七里乡), Huyuan Township (胡源乡), Nanxi Township (南溪乡), Sanxi Township (三溪乡), Qianlu Township (前路乡), Fangxi Township (方溪乡), Shijian Township (石笕乡), Shuangxikou Township (双溪口乡)

=== Qingtian County ===
Towns:

- Hecheng (鹤城镇), Wenxi (温溪镇), Dongyuan (东源镇), Chuanliao (船寮镇), Beishan (北山镇), Shankou (山口镇), Haikou (海口镇), Gaohu (高湖镇), Lakou (腊口镇), Renzhuang (仁庄镇)

Townships:

- Zhangcun Township (章村乡), Shuqiao Township (舒桥乡), Gui'ao Township (贵岙乡), Shixi Township (石溪乡), Zhenbu Township (祯埠乡), Zhenwang Township (祯旺乡), Wanshan Township (万山乡), Huangyang Township (黄垟乡), Jizhai Township (季宅乡), Haixi Township (海溪乡), Gaoshi Township (高市乡), Jupu Township (巨浦乡), Wanfu Township (万阜乡), Tangyang Township (汤垟乡), Fangshan Township (方山乡), Wukeng Township (吴坑乡), Renguan Township (仁宫乡), Zhangdan Township (章旦乡), Fushan Township (阜山乡), Linggen Township (岭根乡), Xiaozhoushan Township (小舟山乡)

=== Qingyuan County ===
Towns:

- Songyuan (松源镇), Huangtian (黄田镇), Zhukou (竹口镇), Pingdu (屏都镇), Hedi (荷地镇), Zuoxi (左溪镇), Xianliang (贤良镇)

Townships:

- Lingtou Township (岭头乡), Wudabao Township (五大堡乡), Yushang Township (淤上乡), Annan Township (安南乡), Zhangcun Township (张村乡), Longgong Township (隆宫乡), Jushui Township (举水乡), Jianggen Township (江根乡), Hehu Township (合湖乡), Baishanzu Township (百山祖乡), Longxi Township (龙溪乡), Guantang Township (官塘乡), Sishan Township (四山乡)

=== Songyang County ===
Towns:

- Xiping (西屏镇), Gushi (古市镇), Yuyan (玉岩镇), Xiangxi (象溪镇), Dadongba (大东坝镇)

Townships:

- Chishou Township (赤寿乡), Xinxing Township (新兴乡), Wangsong Township (望松乡), Sidu Township (四都乡), Xiecun Township (谢村乡), Zhangxi Township (樟溪乡), Sandu Township (三都乡), Xinchu Township (新处乡), Zhaitan Township (斋坛乡), Yecun Township (叶村乡), Zhuyuan Township (竹源乡), Fengping Township (枫坪乡), Yuxi Township (裕溪乡), Anmin Township (安民乡), Banqiao She Ethnic Township (板桥畲族乡)

=== Suichang County ===
Towns:

- Miaogao (妙高镇), Yunfeng (云峰镇), Beijie (北界镇), Dazhe (大柘镇), Shilian (石练镇), Jinzhu (金竹镇), Huangshayao (黄沙腰镇), Xinluwan (新路湾镇), Wangcunkou (王村口镇)

Townships:

- Jiaotan Township (焦滩乡), Yingcun Township (应村乡), Hushan Township (湖山乡), Lianzhu Township (濂竹乡), Gaoping Township (高坪乡), Caiyuan Township (蔡源乡), Longyang Township (龙洋乡), Xifan Township (西畈乡), Ankou Township (垵口乡), Zhedaikou Township (柘岱口乡), Sanren She Ethnic Township (三仁畲族乡)

=== Yunhe County ===
Subdistricts:

- Fuyun Subdistrict (浮云街道), Yuanhe Subdistrict (元和街道), Bailongshan Subdistrict (白龙山街道), Fenghuangshan Subdistrict (凤凰山街道)

Towns:

- Chongtou (崇头镇), Shitang (石塘镇), Jinshuitan (紧水滩镇)

Townships:

- Chishi Township (赤石乡), Wuxi She Ethnic Township (雾溪畲族乡), Anxi She Ethnic Township (安溪畲族乡)

== Quzhou ==
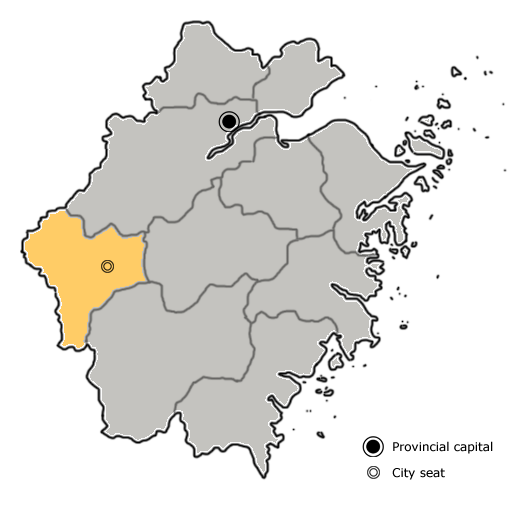
Location of Quzhou in the province

=== Kecheng District ===
Subdistricts:

- Fushan Subdistrict (府山街道), Hehua Subdistrict (荷花街道), Huayuan Subdistrict (花园街道), Xin'an Subdistrict (信安街道), Baiyun Subdistrict (白云街道), Shuanggang Subdistrict (双港街道), Xinxin Subdistrict (新新街道)

Towns:

- Shiliang (石梁镇), Hangbu (航埠镇)

Townships:

- Wantian Township (万田乡), Shishi Township (石室乡), Huangjia Township (黄家乡), Jiangjiashan Township (姜家山乡), Jiuhua Township (九华乡), Qili Township (七里乡), Huashu Township (华墅乡), Gouxi Township (沟溪乡)

=== Qujiang District ===
Subdistricts:

- Zhangzhang Subdistrict (樟潭街道), Fushi Subdistrict (浮石街道)

Towns:

- Shangfang (上方镇), Duze (杜泽镇), Nianli (廿里镇), Houxi (后溪镇), Dazhou (大洲镇), Hunan (湖南镇), Xiachuan (峡川镇), Lianhua (莲花镇), Quanwang (全旺镇), Gaojia (高家镇)

Townships:

- Taizhen Township (太真乡), Yunxi Township (云溪乡), Henglu Township (横路乡), Huiping Township (灰坪乡), Jucun Township (举村乡), Zhoujia Township (周家乡), Shuangqiao Township (双桥乡), Lingyang Township (岭洋乡), Huangtankou Township (黄坛口乡)

=== Jiangshan ===
Subdistricts:

- Hushan Subdistrict (虎山街道), Shuangta Subdistrict (双塔街道)

Towns:

- Shangyu (上余镇), Sidu (四都镇), Hecun (贺村镇), Yutou (淤头镇), Fenglin (凤林镇), Xiakou (峡口镇), Changtai (长台镇), Shimen (石门镇), Daqiao (大桥镇), Qinghu (清湖镇), Tanshi (坛石镇), Xintangbian (新塘边镇), Nianbadu (廿八都镇)

Townships:

- Zhangcun Township (张村乡), Bao'an Township (保安乡), Wanyao Township (碗窑乡), Dachen Township (大陈乡), Tangyuankou Township (塘源口乡), Shuangxikou Township (双溪口乡)

=== Changshan County ===
Towns:

- Tianma, Changshan (天马镇), Zhaoxian, Changshan (招贤镇), Huibu (辉埠镇), Fangcun, Changshan (芳村镇), Qiuchuan (球川镇), Baishi, Changshan (白石镇), Qingshi (青石镇)

Townships:

- Dong'an Township (东案乡), Songfan Township (宋畈乡), Hejia Township (何家乡), Xinqiao Township (新桥乡), Tonggong Township (同弓乡), Xinchang Township (新昌乡), Daqiaotou Township (大桥头乡)

=== Kaihua County ===
Towns:

- Chengguan (城关镇), Huabu (华埠镇), Majin (马金镇), Cuntou (村头镇), Chihuai (池淮镇), Tongcun (桐村镇), Yanglin (杨林镇), Suzhuang (苏庄镇), Qixi (齐溪镇)

Townships:

- Linshan Township (林山乡), Yinkeng Township (音坑乡), Zhongcun Township (中村乡), Changhong Township (长虹乡), Zhangwan Township (张湾乡), Hetian Township (何田乡), Tangwu Township (塘坞乡), Jincun Township (金村乡), Daxibian Township (大溪边乡)

=== Longyou County ===
Subdistricts:

- Donghua Subdistrict (东华街道), Longzhou Subdistrict (龙洲街道)

Towns:

- Huzhen (湖镇镇), Xikou (溪口镇), Hengshan (横山镇), Tashi (塔石镇), Zhanjia (詹家镇), Xiaonanhai (小南海镇)

Townships:

- Miaoxia Township (庙下乡), Shifo Township (石佛乡), Mohuan Township (模环乡), Luojia Township (罗家乡), Sheyang Township (社阳乡), Dajie Township (大街乡), Shujian She Ethnic Township (沐尘畲族乡)

== Shaoxing ==
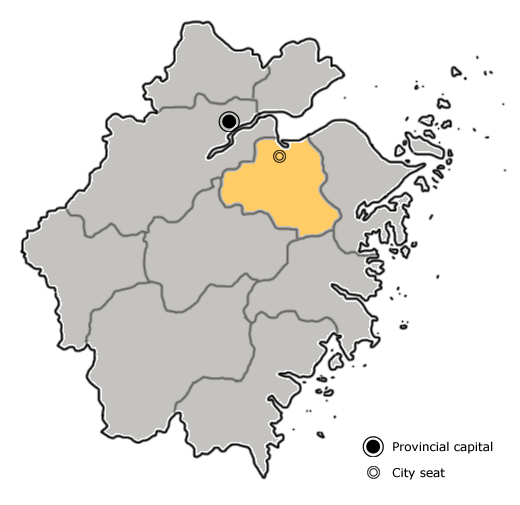
Location of Shaoxing in the province

=== Yuecheng District ===
Subdistricts:

- Tashan Subdistrict (塔山街道), Fushan Subdistrict (府山街道), Beihai Subdistrict (北海街道), Jishan Subdistrict (蕺山街道), Qishan Subdistrict (稽山街道), Chengnan Subdistrict (城南街道)

Towns:

- Donghu (东湖镇), Gaobu (皋埠镇), Mashan (马山镇), Doumen (斗门镇), Jianhu (鉴湖镇), Dongpu (东浦镇), Lingzhi (灵芝镇)

=== Shangyu ===
Subdistricts:

- Baiguan Subdistrict (百官街道), Cao'e Subdistrict (曹娥街道), Dongguan Subdistrict (东关街道)

Towns:

- Daoxu (道墟镇), Shangpu (上浦镇), Tangpu (汤浦镇), Zhangzhen (章镇镇), Xiaguan (下管镇), Fenghui (丰惠镇), Yonghe (永和镇), Lianghu (梁湖镇), Yiting (驿亭镇), Songxia (崧厦镇), Lihai (沥海镇), Xiaoyue (小越镇), Xietang (谢塘镇), Changtang (长塘镇), Gaibei (盖北镇)

Townships:

- Lingnan Township (岭南乡), Chenxi Township (陈溪乡), Dingzhai Township (丁宅乡)

=== Shengzhou ===
Subdistricts:

- Sanjiang Subdistrict (三江街道), Lushan Subdistrict (鹿山街道), Yanhu Subdistrict (剡湖街道), Pukou Subdistrict (浦口街道)

Towns:

- Ganlin (甘霖镇), Xianyan (仙岩镇), Changle (长乐镇), Chongren (崇仁镇), Shihuang (石璜镇), Sanjie (三界镇), Xiawang (下王镇), Huangze (黄泽镇), Beizhang (北漳镇), Jinting (金庭镇), Gulai (谷来镇)

Townships:

- Yahuang Township (雅璜乡), Tongyuan Township (通源乡), Wangyuan Township (王院乡), Zhuxi Township (竹溪乡), Guimen Township (贵门乡), Linan Township (里南乡)

=== Zhuji ===
Subdistricts:

- Jiyang Subdistrict (暨阳街道), Huandong Subdistrict (浣东街道), Taozhu Subdistrict (陶朱街道)

Towns:

- Datang (大唐镇), Ciwu (次坞镇), Diankou (店口镇), Ruanshi (阮市镇), Jiangzao (江藻镇), Fengqiao (枫桥镇), Zhaojia (赵家镇), Majian (马剑镇), Caota (草塔镇), Paitou (牌头镇), Tongshan (同山镇), Anhua (安华镇), Jieting (街亭镇), Huangshan (璜山镇), Lipu (浬浦镇), Zhibu (直埠镇), Wuxie (五泄镇), Lingbei (岭北镇), Chenzhai (陈宅镇), Wangjiajing (王家井镇), Yingdianjie (应店街镇), Shanxiahu (山下湖镇), Dongbaihu (东白湖镇)

The only township is Donghe Township (东和乡)

=== Shaoxing County ===
Subdistricts:

- Keqiao Subdistrict (柯桥街道), Keyan Subdistrict (柯岩街道), Huashe Subdistrict (华舍街道), Hutang Subdistrict (湖塘街道)

Towns:

- Dongjixian (东齐贤镇), Qianqing (钱清镇), Sunduan (孙端镇), Fuquan (福全镇), Ma'an (马鞍镇), Pingshui (平水镇), Anchang (安昌镇), Wangtan (王坛镇), Lanting (兰亭镇), Jidong (稽东镇), Lizhu (漓渚镇), Fusheng (富盛镇), Taoyan (陶堰镇), Xialü (夏履镇), Yangxunqiao (杨汛桥镇)

=== Xinchang County ===
Subdistricts:

- Yulin Subdistrict (羽林街道), Nanming Subdistrict (南明街道), Qixing Subdistrict (七星街道)

Towns:

- Shaxi (沙溪镇), Ru'ao (儒岙镇), Huishan (回山镇), Chengtan (澄潭镇), Xiaojiang (小将镇), Jingling (镜岭镇), Meizhu (梅渚镇), Dashiju (大市聚镇)

Townships:

- Shuangcai Township (双彩乡), Qiaoying Township (巧英乡), Dongming Township (东茗乡), Xinlin Township (新林乡), Chengnan Township (城南乡)

== Taizhou ==
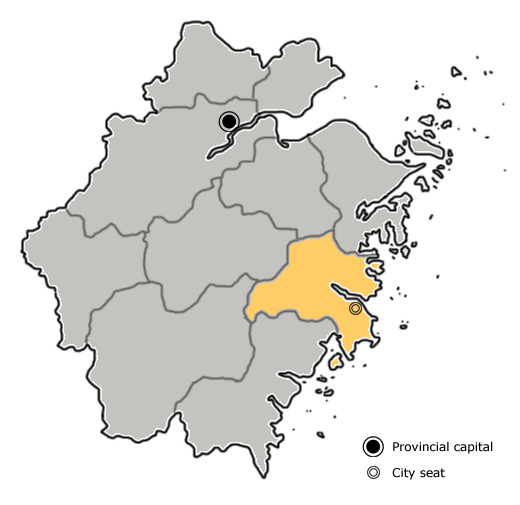
Location of Taizhou in the province

=== Huangyan District ===
Subdistricts:

- Dongcheng Subdistrict (东城街道), Xicheng Subdistrict (西城街道), Nancheng Subdistrict (南城街道), Beicheng Subdistrict (北城街道), Chengjiang Subdistrict (澄江街道), Xinqian Subdistrict (新前街道), Jiangkou Subdistrict (江口街道), Gaoqiao, Taizhou (高桥街道)

Towns:

- Ningxi (宁溪镇), Beiyang (北洋镇), Toutuo (头陀镇), Yuanqiao (院桥镇), Shabu (沙埠镇)

Townships:

- Fushan Township (富山乡), Shangzheng Township (上郑乡), Yutou Township (屿头乡), Shangyang Township (上垟乡), Maoshe Township (茅畲乡), Pingtian Township (平田乡)

=== Jiaojiang District ===
Subdistricts:

- Haimen Subdistrict (海门街道), Baiyun Subdistrict (白云街道), Jiazhi Subdistrict (葭沚街道), Zhang'an Subdistrict (章安街道), Hongjia Subdistrict (洪家街道), Xiachen Subdistrict (下陈街道), Qiansuo Subdistrict (前所街道), Sanjia Subdistrict (三甲街道)

The only town is Dachen (大陈镇)

=== Luqiao District ===
Subdistricts:

- Lunan Subdistrict (路南街道), Luqiao Subdistrict (路桥街道), Lubei Subdistrict (路北街道), Luoyang Subdistrict (螺洋街道), Tongyu Subdistrict (桐屿街道), Fengjiang Subdistrict (峰江街道)

Towns:

- Xinqiao (新桥镇), Hengjie (横街镇), Jinqing (金清镇), Pengjie (蓬街镇)

=== Linhai ===
Subdistricts:

- Gucheng Subdistrict (古城街道), Dayang Subdistrict (大洋街道), Jiangnan Subdistrict (江南街道), Datian Subdistrict (大田街道), Shaojiadu Subdistrict (邵家渡街道)

Towns:

- Xunqiao (汛桥镇), Dongcheng (东塍镇), Xiaozhi (小芝镇), Taozhu (桃渚镇), Shangpan (上盘镇), Duqiao (杜桥镇), Yongquan (涌泉镇), Youxi (尤溪镇), Hetou (河头镇), Yanjiang (沿江镇), Kuocang (括苍镇), Yongfeng (永丰镇), Huixi (汇溪镇), Baishuiyang (白水洋镇)

=== Wenling ===
Subdistricts:

- Taiping Subdistrict (太平街道), Chengdong Subdistrict (城东街道), Chengxi Subdistrict (城西街道), Chengbei Subdistrict (城北街道), Hengfeng Subdistrict (横峰街道)

Towns:

- Daxi (大溪镇), Zeguo (泽国镇), Xinhe (新河镇), Ruoheng (箬横镇), Songmen (松门镇), Shitang (石塘镇), Chengnan (城南镇), Binhai (滨海镇), Wugen (坞根镇), Shiqiaotou (石桥头镇), Wenqiao (温峤镇)

=== Yuhuan ===
Subdistricts:

- Yucheng Subdistrict (玉城街道), Kanmen Subdistrict (坎门街道), Damaiyu Subdistrict (大麦屿街道)

Towns:

- Qinggang (清港镇), Chumen (楚门镇), Ganjiang (干江镇), Shamen (沙门镇), Lupu (芦浦镇), Longxi (龙溪镇)

Townships:

- Jishan Township (鸡山乡), Haishan Township (海山乡)

=== Sanmen County ===
Towns:

- Haiyou (海游镇), Shaliu (沙柳镇), Zhu'ao (珠岙镇), Tingpang (亭旁镇), Liu'ao (六敖镇), Hengdu (横渡镇), Jiantiao (健跳镇), Lipu (浬浦镇), Huaqiao (花桥镇), Xiaoxiong (小雄镇)

Townships:

- Gaojian Township (高枧乡), Yanchi Township (沿赤乡), Silin Township (泗淋乡), Shepan Township (蛇蟠乡)

=== Tiantai County ===
Subdistricts:

- Chicheng Subdistrict (赤城街道), Shifeng Subdistrict (始丰街道), Fuxi Subdistrict (福溪街道)

Towns:

- Baihe (白鹤镇), Shiliang (石梁镇), Jietou (街头镇), Pingqiao (平桥镇), Tantou (坦头镇), Sanhe (三合镇), Hongchou (洪畴镇)

Townships:

- Sanzhou Township (三州乡), Longxi Township (龙溪乡), Leifeng Township (雷峰乡), Nanping Township (南屏乡), Yongxi Township (泳溪乡)

=== Xianju County ===
Subdistricts:

- Fuying Subdistrict (福应街道), Nanfeng Subdistrict (南峰街道), Anzhou Subdistrict (安洲街道)

Towns:

- Hengxi (横溪镇), Baita (白塔镇), Tianshi (田市镇), Guanlu (官路镇), Xiage (下各镇), Zhuxi (朱溪镇), Butou (埠头镇)

Townships:

- Anling Township (安岭乡), Xigang Township (溪港乡), Qiushan Township (湫山乡), Potan Township (皤滩乡), Tanzhu Township (淡竹乡), Bulu Township (步路乡), Shangzhang Township (上张乡), Guangdu Township (广度乡), Dazhan Township (大战乡), Shuangmiao Township (双庙乡)

== Wenzhou ==
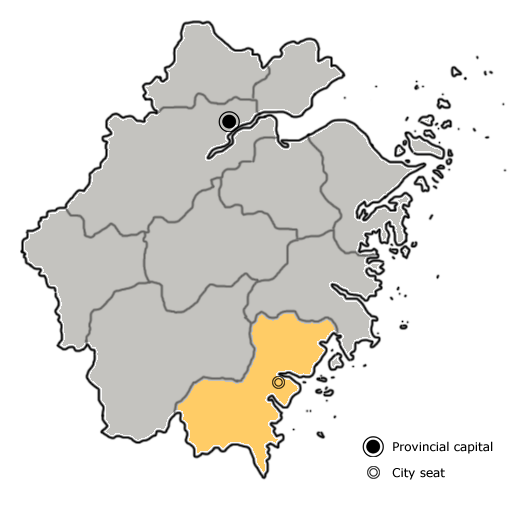
Location of Wenzhou in the province

=== Longwan District ===
Subdistricts:

- Yongzhong Subdistrict (永中街道), Haibin Subdistrict (海滨街道), Yongxing Subdistrict (永兴街道), Puzhou Subdistrict (蒲州街道), Haicheng Subdistrict (海城街道), Zhuangyuan Subdistrict (状元街道), Yaoxi Subdistrict (瑶溪街道), Shacheng Subdistrict (沙城街道), Tianhe Subdistrict (天河街道), Lingkun Subdistrict (灵昆街道), Xinghai Subdistrict (星海街道)

=== Lucheng District ===
Subdistricts:

- Wuma Subdistrict (五马街道), Lianchi Subdistrict (莲池街道), Shuixin Subdistrict (水心街道), Nanmen Subdistrict (南门街道), Jiangbin Subdistrict (江滨街道), Puxieshi Subdistrict (蒲鞋市街道), Guanghua Subdistrict (广化街道), Hongdian Subdistrict (洪殿街道), Nanpu Subdistrict (南浦街道), Liming Subdistrict (黎明街道), Xiushan Subdistrict (绣山街道), Huanglong Subdistrict (黄龙街道), Shuangyu Subdistrict (双屿街道), Qidu Subdistrict (七都街道), Yangyi Subdistrict (仰义街道), Nanjiao Subdistrict (南郊街道)

The only town is Tengqiao (藤桥镇)

=== Ouhai District ===
Twelve subdistricts:

- Louqiao Subdistrict (娄桥街道), Xinqiao Subdistrict (新桥街道), Wutian Subdistrict (梧田街道), Jingshan Subdistrict (景山街道), Chashan Subdistrict (茶山街道), Sanyang Subdistrict (三垟街道), Nanbaixiang Subdistrict (南白象街道), Quxi Subdistrict (瞿溪街道), Panqiao Subdistrict (潘桥街道), Guoxi Subdistrict (郭溪街道), Li'ao Subdistrict (丽岙街道), Xianyan Subdistrict (仙岩街道)

The only town is Zeya (泽雅镇)

=== Rui'an ===
Subdistricts:

- Anyang Subdistrict (安阳街道), Jinhu Subdistrict (锦湖街道), Yuhai Subdistrict (玉海街道), Dongshan Subdistrict (东山街道), Shangwang Subdistrict (上望街道), Xincheng Subdistrict (莘塍街道), Tingtian Subdistrict (汀田街道), Feiyun Subdistrict (飞云街道), Xianfeng Subdistrict (仙降街道), Nanbin Subdistrict (南滨街道)

Towns:

- Tangxia (塘下镇), Mayu (马屿镇), Taoshan (陶山镇), Huling (湖岭镇), Gaolou (高楼镇)

=== Yueqing ===
Subdistricts:

- Chengdong Subdistrict (城东街道), Yuecheng Subdistrict (乐成街道), Chengnan Subdistrict (城南街道), Yanpen Subdistrict (盐盆街道), Wengyang Subdistrict (翁垟街道), Baishi Subdistrict (白石街道), Shifan Subdistrict (石帆街道), Tiancheng Subdistrict (天成街道)

Towns:

- Dajing (大荆镇), Xianxi (仙溪镇), Yandang (雁荡镇), Furong (芙蓉镇), Qingjiang (清江镇), Hongqiao (虹桥镇), Danxi (淡溪镇), Liushi (柳市镇), Beibaixiang (北白象镇)

=== Cangnan County ===
Towns:

- Lingxi (灵溪镇), Longgang (龙港镇), Yishan (宜山镇), Qianku (钱库镇), Zaoxi (藻溪镇), Qiaodun (桥墩镇), Jinxiang (金乡镇), Fanshan (矾山镇), Chixi (赤溪镇), Mazhan (马站镇)

Townships:

- Fengyang She Ethnic Township (凤阳畲族乡), Dailing She Ethnic Township (岱岭畲族乡)

=== Dongtou County ===
Subdistricts:

- Bei'ao Subdistrict (北岙街道), Yuanjue Subdistrict (元觉街道), Dongping Subdistrict (东屏街道), Niyu Subdistrict (霓屿街道)

The only town is Damen (大门镇), and the only township is Luxi Township (鹿西乡)

=== Pingyang County ===
Towns:

- Kunyang (昆阳镇), Aojiang (鳌江镇), Shuitou (水头镇), Xiaojiang (萧江镇), Tengjiao (腾蛟镇), Wanquan (万全镇), Mabu (麻步镇), Shunxi (顺溪镇), Shanmen (山门镇), Nanya (南雁镇)

The only township is Qingjie She Ethnic Township (青街畲族乡)

=== Taishun County ===
Towns:

- Luoyang (罗阳镇), Baizhang (百丈镇), Sixi (泗溪镇), Yayang (雅阳镇), Shiyang (仕阳镇), Sankui (三魁镇), Xiaocun (筱村镇), Pengxi (彭溪镇)

Townships:

- Siqian She Ethnic Township (司前畲族镇), Zhuli She Ethnic Township (竹里畲族乡)

=== Wencheng County ===
Towns:

- Daxue (大峃镇), Shanxi (珊溪镇), Yuhu (玉壶镇), Nantian (南田镇), Huangtan (黄坦镇), Juyu (巨屿镇), Baizhangji (百丈漈镇), Xuekou (峃口镇)

Townships:

- Xikeng She Ethnic Township (西坑畲族镇), Zhoushan She Ethnic Township (周山畲族乡)

=== Yongjia County ===
Subdistricts of the Shangtang Administrative Committee (上塘管委会):

- Beicheng Subdistrict (北城街道), Dongcheng Subdistrict (东城街道), Nancheng Subdistrict (南城街道)

Subdistricts of the Oubei Administrative Committee (瓯北管委会):

- Dong'ou Subdistrict (东瓯街道), Jiangbei Subdistrict (江北街道), Huangtian Subdistrict (黄田街道), Sanjiang Subdistrict (三江街道), Wuniu Subdistrict (乌牛街道)

Towns:

- Qiaotou (桥头镇), Qiaoxia (桥下镇), Shatou (沙头镇), Bilian (碧莲镇), Xunzhai (巽宅镇), Yantou (岩头镇), Fenglin (枫林镇), Yantan (岩坦镇), Daruoyan (大箬岩镇), Hesheng (鹤盛镇)

== Zhoushan ==
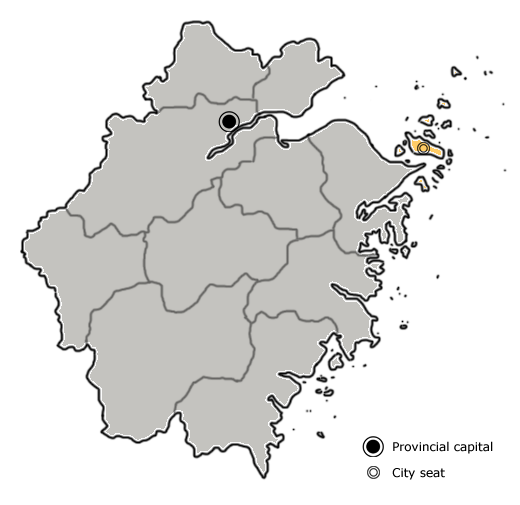
Location of Zhoushan in the province

=== Dinghai District ===
Subdistricts:

- Jiefang Subdistrict (解放街道), Huannan Subdistrict (环南街道), Changguo Subdistrict (昌国街道), Chengdong Subdistrict (城东街道), Lincheng Subdistrict (临城街道), Yancang Subdistrict (盐仓街道)

Towns:

- Jintang (金塘镇), Baiquan (白泉镇), Cengang (岑港镇), Ganlan (干𥗽镇), Xiaosha (小沙镇), Ma'ao (马岙镇), Shuangqiao (双桥镇)

Townships:

- Changbai Township (长白乡), Cezi Township (册子乡), Beichan Township (北蝉乡)

=== Putuo District ===
Subdistricts:

- Shenjiamen Subdistrict (沈家门街道), Goushan Subdistrict (勾山街道), Donggang Subdistrict (东港街道), Zhanmao Subdistrict (展茅街道), Zhujiajian Subdistrict (朱家尖街道)

Towns:

- Liuheng (六横镇), Taohua (桃花镇), Xiazhi (虾峙镇), Dongji (东极镇), Putuoshan (普陀山镇)

Townships:

- Baisha Township (白沙乡), Dengbu Township (登步乡), Mayidao Township (蚂蚁岛乡)

=== Daishan County ===
Towns:

- Gaoting (高亭镇), Qushan (衢山镇), Dongsha (东沙镇), Daixi (岱西镇), Changtu (长涂镇), Daidong (岱东镇)

Township

- Xiushan Township (秀山乡)

=== Shengsi County ===
Towns:

- Caiyuan (菜园镇), Shengshan (嵊山镇), Yangshan (洋山镇)

Townships:

- Wulong Township (五龙乡), Huanglong Township (黄龙乡), Gouqi Township (枸杞乡), Huadao Township (花鸟乡)
