= Xiakou =

Xiakou may refer to these towns in China:

- Xiakou, Chongqing (峡口), in Nan'an District, Chongqing
- Xiakou, Gansu (峡口), in Lintao County, Gansu
- Xiakou, Fucheng County (霞口), in Fucheng County, Hebei
- Xiakou, Shijiazhuang (下口), in Pingshan County, Hebei
- Xiakou, Hubei (峡口), in Xingshan County, Hubei
- Xiakou, Ningxia (峡口), in Qingtongxia, Ningxia
- Xiakou, Shaanxi (峡口), in Xixiang County, Shaanxi
- Xiakou, Zhejiang (峡口), in Jiangshan, Zhejiang
- Xiakou (夏口), a former name of Hankou, in modern Wuhan, Hubei

== See also ==
- Battle of Xiakou, fought between the warlords Sun Quan and Liu Biao in 203 in the late Eastern Han dynasty
- Xikou (disambiguation)
