= Changhong (disambiguation) =

Changhong may refer to:

- Changhong, Chinese consumer electronics company
- Changhong Technology, Chinese injection moulding company
- Changhong Township, in Kaihua County, Zhejiang, China
- Chang Hong (died 492 BC), scholar, politician, educator and astronomer in ancient China
