= Dayin =

Dayin may refer to the following locations in China:

- Dayin, Hebei (大因镇), town in Xushui County
- Dayin, Zhejiang (大隐镇), town in Yuyao
