= Longwan (disambiguation) =

Longwan is an outlying district of the city of Wenzhou, Zhejiang province, China.

Longwan (龙湾) may also refer to:

- Longwan, Qianjiang, Hubei, town in Qianjiang, Hubei
- Longwan Township, Xiong County, Hebei, see Xiong County
