= Baishe =

Baishe may refer to:

- Bai Suzhen, mythical character from the Chinese legend Madame White Snake
- White Snake (film), 2019 Chinese film based on the legend
- Baishe, Jiangxi, a town in Nanfeng County, Jiangxi, China
- Baishe Township, Lanxi, Zhejiang, China

== See also ==
- Baishe Srabon, 2011 Indian Bengali film
