= Shanxi (disambiguation) =

Shanxi (山西) is a province in North China.

Shanxi may also refer to:

- Shaanxi (陕西), a neighboring province to the west of Shanxi
- Shanxi, Zhejiang (珊溪镇), a town in Wencheng County, Zhejiang, China
- Shaanxi Circuit (陜西路), a circuit or province of the Song dynasty
