= Fu Sheng =

Fu Sheng or Fusheng may refer to:

== People ==
- Yan Hui (c. 521–481 BC), disciple of Confucius, also known as Fu Sheng (復聖)
- Fu Sheng (scholar) (伏生 or 伏勝, 268–178 BC), Confucian scholar during the Qin and Han dynasties
- Fu Sheng (Former Qin) (苻生, 335–357), emperor of Former Qin
- Alexander Fu Sheng (傅聲, 1954–1983), Hong Kong actor

== Towns in China ==
- Fusheng, Chongqing (复盛)
  - Fusheng railway station
- Fusheng, Zhejiang (富盛), in Shaoxing, Zhejiang

== Others ==
- Bliss (2006 film) (浮生), Chinese film by Sheng Zhimin
- Fusheng (附生), one of the degree types of the imperial examination
