= Shangxi =

Shangxi may refer to the following locations in China:

- Shanxi, sometimes misspelled as Shangxi
- Shangxi, Zhejiang (上溪镇)
- Shangxi Township (上溪乡), Yongfeng County, Jiangxi
