= Wencheng County =

Wencheng 文成县
- County
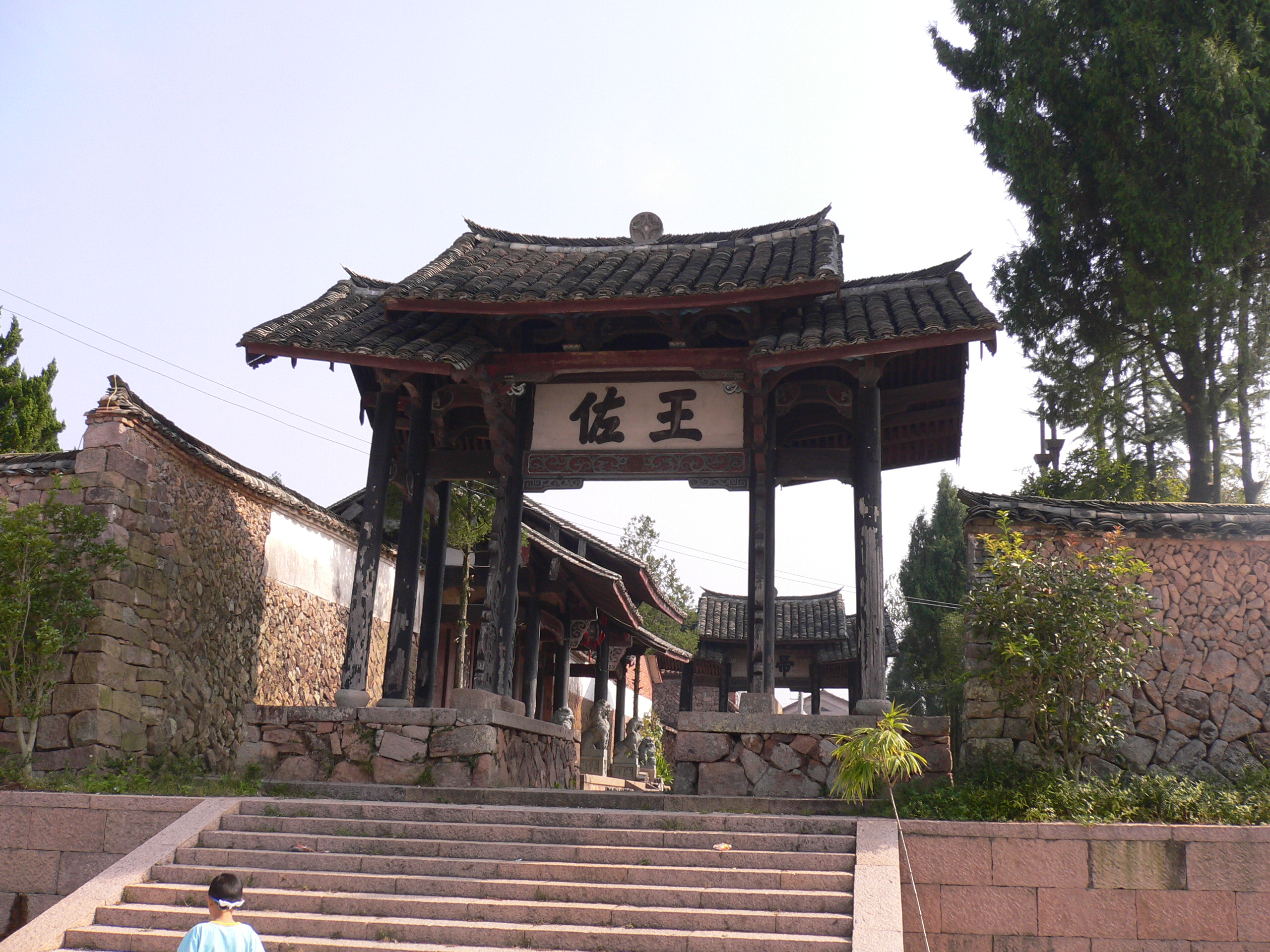
- Shrine of Liu Bowen, Wencheng

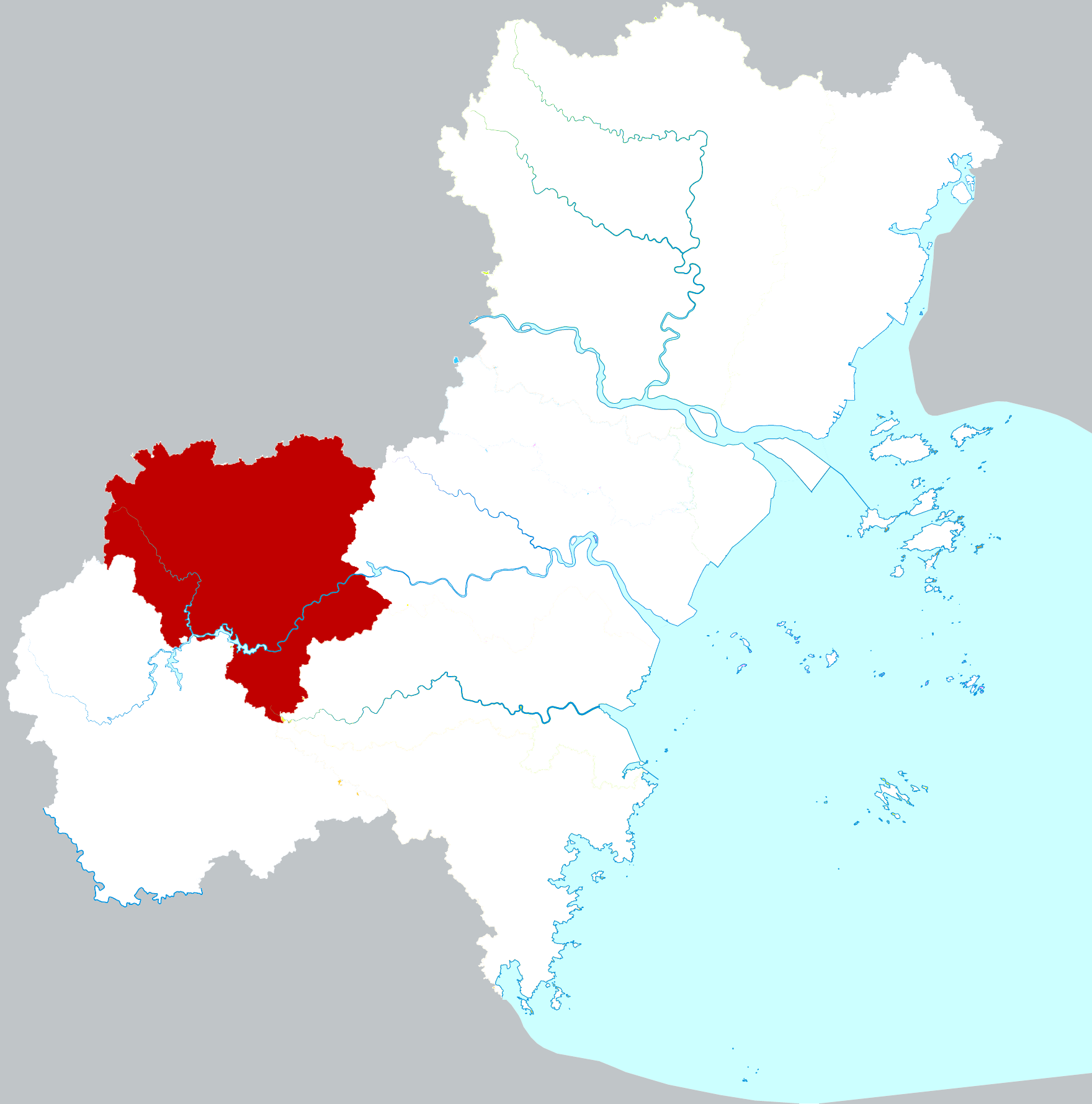
- Location of Wencheng County within Wenzhou

- Location of the seat in Zhejiang
- Coordinates: 27°47′13″N 120°05′29″E
- Country: People's Republic of China
- Province: Zhejiang
- Prefecture-level city: Wenzhou

Area
  - Total: 1,293.24 km^{2} (499.32 sq mi)

Population (2020)
  - Total: 288,200
  - Density: 222.9/km^{2} (577.2/sq mi)
- Time zone: UTC+8 (China Standard)

Wencheng (simplified Chinese: 文成县; traditional Chinese: 文成縣; pinyin: Wénchéng Xiàn) is one of the five counties in the prefecture-level city of Wenzhou, in southern Zhejiang province, with a population of 250,000 as of 2016.

The county is located in the southwest of Wenzhou city proper, and borders Ruian city, Taishun County and Pingyang County. It is named after Liu Bowen, posthumous name Wencheng, who was born in the county.

Many natives of Wencheng migrated to Europe in the 1990s, most of which are now living in the Netherlands, Italy, France, and Spain.

Mountainous areas account for 82.5% of the total land area of Wencheng, with the highest peak of 1362 meters above sea in Shiyanglinchang (North West Wencheng)

== Administrative divisions ==
Towns:

- Daxue (大峃镇), Baizhangji (百丈漈镇), Nantian (南田镇), Xikengshezu (西坑畲族镇), Huangtan (黄坦镇), Shanxi (珊溪镇), Juyu (巨屿镇), Yuhu (玉壶镇), Likou (峃口镇), Zhourang (周壤镇), Tonglingshan (铜铃山镇), Eryuan (二源镇)

Townships:

- Zhoushanshezu (周山畲族乡), Guishan (桂山乡), Shuanggui (双桂乡), Pinghe (平和乡), Gongyang (公阳乡)

== Climate ==
Climate data for Wencheng, elevation 105 m (344 ft), (1991–2020 normals, extremes 1981–2010)
Month	Jan	Feb	Mar	Apr	May	Jun	Jul	Aug	Sep	Oct	Nov	Dec	Year
Record high °C (°F)	27.5 (81.5)	30.7 (87.3)	35.4 (95.7)	35.9 (96.6)	38.7 (101.7)	39.8 (103.6)	41.7 (107.1)	40.6 (105.1)	39.4 (102.9)	35.7 (96.3)	33.6 (92.5)	29.8 (85.6)	41.7 (107.1)
Mean daily maximum °C (°F)	13.5 (56.3)	15.2 (59.4)	18.3 (64.9)	23.7 (74.7)	27.6 (81.7)	30.6 (87.1)	34.4 (93.9)	33.6 (92.5)	30.1 (86.2)	25.9 (78.6)	20.9 (69.6)	15.8 (60.4)	24.1 (75.4)
Daily mean °C (°F)	8.4 (47.1)	9.7 (49.5)	12.7 (54.9)	17.7 (63.9)	22.0 (71.6)	25.4 (77.7)	28.4 (83.1)	27.9 (82.2)	24.9 (76.8)	20.2 (68.4)	15.4 (59.7)	10.2 (50.4)	18.6 (65.4)
Mean daily minimum °C (°F)	5.1 (41.2)	6.3 (43.3)	9.1 (48.4)	13.6 (56.5)	18.2 (64.8)	22.0 (71.6)	24.4 (75.9)	24.2 (75.6)	21.4 (70.5)	16.3 (61.3)	11.8 (53.2)	6.6 (43.9)	14.9 (58.9)
Record low °C (°F)	−4.8 (23.4)	−3.7 (25.3)	−2.5 (27.5)	3.1 (37.6)	9.2 (48.6)	13.3 (55.9)	18.6 (65.5)	19.0 (66.2)	13.0 (55.4)	5.0 (41.0)	0.0 (32.0)	−5.9 (21.4)	−5.9 (21.4)
Average precipitation mm (inches)	58.6 (2.31)	78.6 (3.09)	150.5 (5.93)	147.6 (5.81)	193.7 (7.63)	280.2 (11.03)	213.7 (8.41)	277.9 (10.94)	201.6 (7.94)	70.6 (2.78)	71.3 (2.81)	54.0 (2.13)	1,798.3 (70.81)
Average precipitation days (≥ 0.1 mm)	12.6	13.4	17.8	16.8	17.7	19.0	15.5	18.0	14.3	8.8	10.7	10.2	174.8
Average snowy days	1.0	0.9	0.2	0	0	0	0	0	0	0	0	0.4	2.5
Average relative humidity (%)	76	77	78	78	79	83	79	80	80	77	79	76	79
Mean monthly sunshine hours	99.6	96.0	106.6	130.3	132.4	127.8	217.4	198.5	158.9	155.7	113.8	116.4	1,653.4
Percentage possible sunshine	30	30	29	34	32	31	52	49	43	44	35	36	37
Source: China Meteorological Administration
