= Xikou (disambiguation) =

Xikou is a town in Fenghua District, Ningbo, Zhejiang Province, China.

Xikou (Chinese: 溪口) may also refer to:

== China ==
- Xikou, Longyou County, in Longyou County, Zhejiang Province
- Xikou, Xiushui County, in Xiushui County, Jiangxi Province
- Xikou, Xiuning County, in Xiuning County, Anhui Province
- Xikou, Xuancheng, in Xuanzhou District, Xuancheng, Anhui Province
- Xikou, Cili County, in Cili County, Hunan Province
- Xikou, Tongdao, a town in Tongdao Dong Autonomous County, Hunan Province
- Xikou, Huaying, in Huaying City, Sichuan Province
- Xikou, Jianning County, in Jianning County, Fujian Province

== Taiwan ==
- Xikou, Chiayi, a rural township in Chiayi County
- Xikou, Hualien, a village in Shoufeng, Hualien, and location of the TRA's Xikou Station

== See also ==
- Xiakou (disambiguation)
