= Ganlin =

Ganlin 甘霖镇
- Town
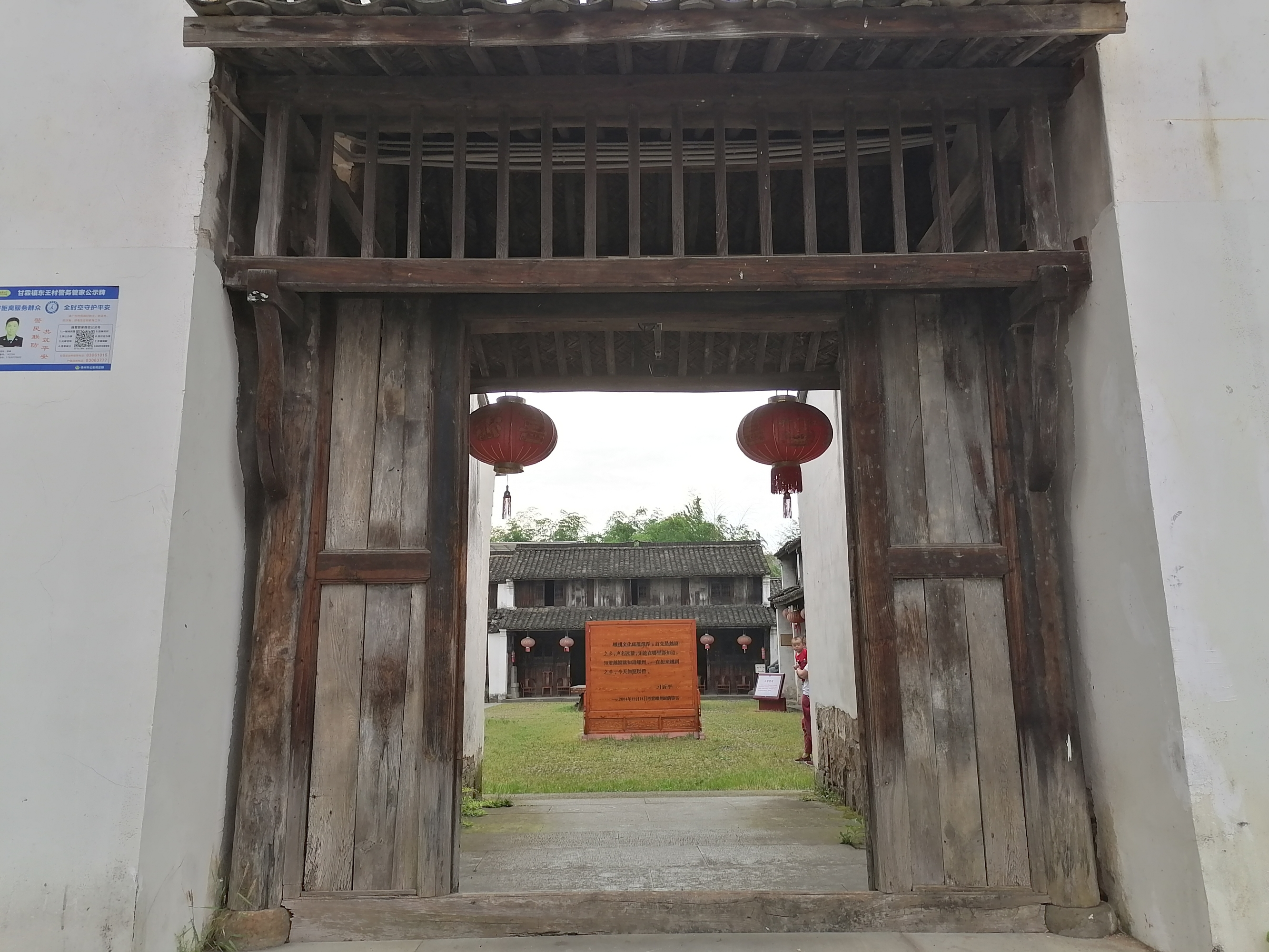
- Dongwang Village, the birthplace of Yue opera

- Location in Zhejiang
- Coordinates: 29°31′37″N 120°43′18″E
- Country: People's Republic of China
- Province: Zhejiang
- Prefecture-level city: Shaoxing
- County-level city: Shengzhou
- Time zone: UTC+8 (China Standard)

Ganlin (Chinese: 甘霖; pinyin: Gānlín) is a town in Shengzhou, Zhejiang province, China. As of 2020, it has two neighborhoods and 35 villages under its administration:

Neighborhoods

- Ganlin
- Boji (博济)

Villages

- Ganlin Village
- Yashen Village (雅沈村)
- Yinjia Village (尹家村)
- Huangshengtang Village (黄胜堂村)
- Jiaozhen Village (蛟镇村)
- Dongwang Village (东王村)
- Huangjianban Village (黄箭坂村)
- Shanggao Village (上高村)
- Liu'an Village (柳岸村)
- Bainidun Village (白泥墩村)
- Jiangtian Village (江田村)
- Jiaxiuban Village (甲秀坂村)
- Zha Village (查村)
- Matang Village (马塘村)
- Dawangmiao Village (大王庙村)
- Shangluxi Village (上路西村)
- Kong Village (孔村)
- Cangyan Village (苍岩村)
- Dianqian Village (殿前村)
- Shijia'ao Village (施家岙村)
- Chang'an Village (长安村)
- Shidaodi Village (石道地村)
- Haoling Village (毫岭村)
- Caiwang Village (蔡王村)
- Luohu Village (罗湖村)
- Louzhuang Village (楼庄村)
- Shadi Village (沙地村)
- Shangye Village (上叶村)
- Meijia Village (梅家村)
- Jinxiu Village (锦秀村)
- Fenghuangke Village (凤凰窠村)
- Shanbei Village (剡北村)
- Yangqiao Village (洋桥村)
- Dongxi Village (东溪村)
- Xiaohuangshan Village (小黄山村)

== See also ==
- List of township-level divisions of Zhejiang
