= Cuizhuang =

Cuizhuang 崔庄镇
- Town
- Cuīzhuāng Zhèn
- Location in Hebei Location in China
- Coordinates: 39°00′03″N 115°43′29″E
- Country: People's Republic of China
- Province: Hebei
- Prefecture-level city: Baoding
- District: Xushui

Area
  - Total: 69.22 km^{2} (26.73 sq mi)

Population (2010)
  - Total: 66,747
  - Density: 964.3/km^{2} (2,498/sq mi)
- Time zone: UTC+8 (China Standard)

Cuizhuang (Chinese: 崔庄镇; pinyin: Cuīzhuāng Zhèn) is a town located in Xushui District, Baoding, Hebei, China. According to the 2010 census, Cuizhuang had a population of 66,747, including 34,064 males and 32,683 females. The population was distributed as follows: 10,992 people aged under 14, 50,022 people aged between 15 and 64, and 5,733 people aged over 65.

== See also ==
- List of township-level divisions of Hebei
