= Chixi Subdistrict =

Chixi Subdistrict 赤溪街道
- Subdistrict
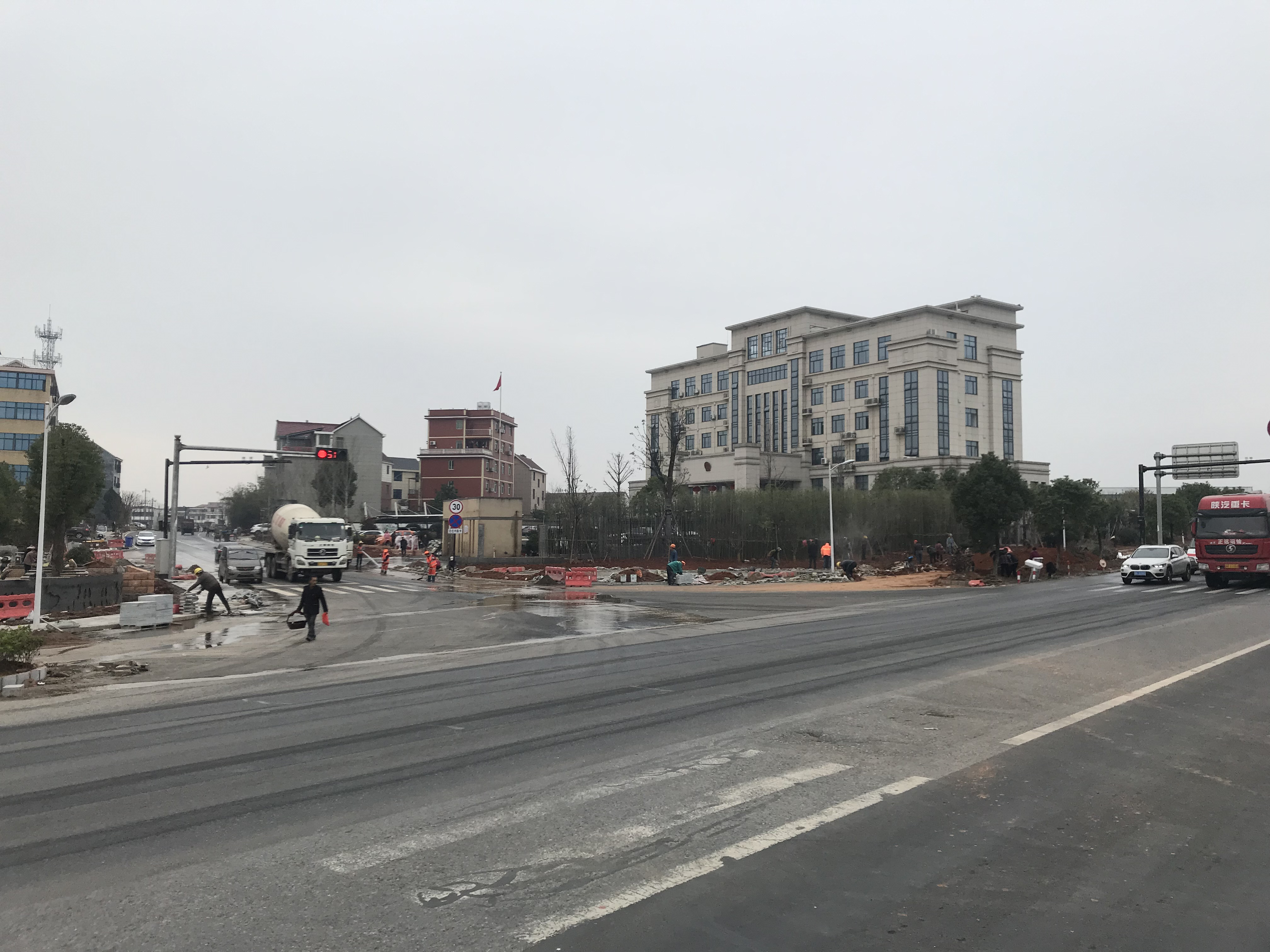
- Chixi Subdistrict government building in 2018

- Location in Zhejiang
- Coordinates: 29°11′27″N 119°23′24″E
- Country: People's Republic of China
- Province: Zhejiang
- Prefecture-level city: Jinhua
- County-level city: Lanxi
- Time zone: UTC+8 (China Standard)

Chixi Subdistrict (Chinese: 赤溪街道; pinyin: Chìxī Jiēdào) is a subdistrict in Lanxi, Zhejiang, China. As of 2020, it administers Shilongtou Residential Community (石龙头社区) and the following eleven villages:

- Wangtiedian Village (王铁店村)
- Changmantang Village (常满塘村)
- Liutang Village (柳塘村)
- Hougong Village (后龚村)
- Zhuli Village (朱犁村)
- Shilongtou Village (石龙头村)
- Yangtang Village (杨塘村)
- Shanbeigang Village (山背岗村)
- Jinqiao Village (金桥村)
- Shangxiatang Village (上下汤村)
- Limin Village (利民村)

== See also ==
- List of township-level divisions of Zhejiang
