= Daqiao, Jiangshan =

Daqiao 大桥镇
- Town
- Location in Zhejiang
- Coordinates: 28°44′31″N 118°24′30″E
- Country: People's Republic of China
- Province: Zhejiang
- Prefecture-level city: Quzhou
- County-level city: Jiangshan
- Time zone: UTC+8 (China Standard)

Daqiao (simplified Chinese: 大桥; traditional Chinese: 大橋; pinyin: Dàqiáo) is a town in Jiangshan, Quzhou, Zhejiang province, China. As of 2018, it has 15 villages under its administration.

== See also ==
- List of township-level divisions of Zhejiang
