= Sishan Township =

Former town in Qingyuan county in China

Sishan Township (Chinese: 四山乡) is a former township of Qingyuan County in the Lishui prefecture-level city of Zhejiang in China. In 2011, it was merged with the Songyuan Town (松源镇) into the newly formed Songyuan subdistrict (松源街道).

== See also ==
- List of township-level divisions of Zhejiang
