= Baisha Subdistrict, Ningbo =

Baisha Subdistrict 白沙街道
- Subdistrict
- Location in Zhejiang
- Coordinates: 29.8877°N 121.5673°E
- Country: People's Republic of China
- Province: Zhejiang
- Prefecture-level city: Ningbo
- District: Jiangbei District
- Time zone: UTC+8 (China Standard)

Baisha Subdistrict (Chinese: 白沙街道; pinyin: Báishā Jiēdào) is a subdistrict in Jiangbei District, Ningbo, Zhejiang, China. As of 2018, it has 5 residential communities under its administration.

== See also ==
- List of township-level divisions of Zhejiang
