= Gaolincun =

Gaolincun 高林村镇
- Town
- Gāolíncūn Zhèn
- Location in Hebei Location in China
- Coordinates: 39°05′19″N 115°39′42″E
- Country: People's Republic of China
- Province: Hebei
- Prefecture-level city: Baoding
- District: Xushui

Area
  - Total: 68.06 km^{2} (26.28 sq mi)

Population (2010)
  - Total: 40,729
  - Density: 598.4/km^{2} (1,550/sq mi)
- Time zone: UTC+8 (China Standard)

Gaolincun (Chinese: 高林村镇; pinyin: Gāolíncūn Zhèn) is a town located in Xushui District, Baoding, Hebei, China. According to the 2010 census, Gaolincun had a population of 40,729, including 20,398 males and 20,331 females. The population was distributed as follows: 6,290 people aged under 14, 30,443 people aged between 15 and 64, and 3,996 people aged over 65.

== See also ==
- List of township-level divisions of Hebei
