= Zhuangyuan Subdistrict, Wenzhou =

Zhuangyuan Subdistrict 状元街道
- Subdistrict
- Location in Zhejiang
- Coordinates: 27°58′24″N 120°45′43″E
- Country: People's Republic of China
- Province: Zhejiang
- Prefecture-level city: Wenzhou
- District: Longwan District
- Time zone: UTC+8 (China Standard)

Zhuangyuan Subdistrict (Chinese: 状元街道; pinyin: Zhuàngyuán Jiēdào) is a subdistrict in Longwan District, Wenzhou, Zhejiang province, China. As of 2020, it administers the following three residential neighborhoods and six villages:

Neighborhoods

- Longyue Community (龙跃社区)
- Longteng Community (龙腾社区)
- Luoxi Community (罗西社区)

Villages

- Zhuangyuanqiao Village (状元桥村)
- Hengjie Village (横街村)
- Yushiqiao Village (御史桥村)
- Shanxi'ao Village (山西岙村)
- Xitai Village (西台村)
- Shitan Village (石坦村)

== See also ==
- List of township-level divisions of Zhejiang
