= Xushui, Baoding =

Xushui 徐水区 Sushui
- District
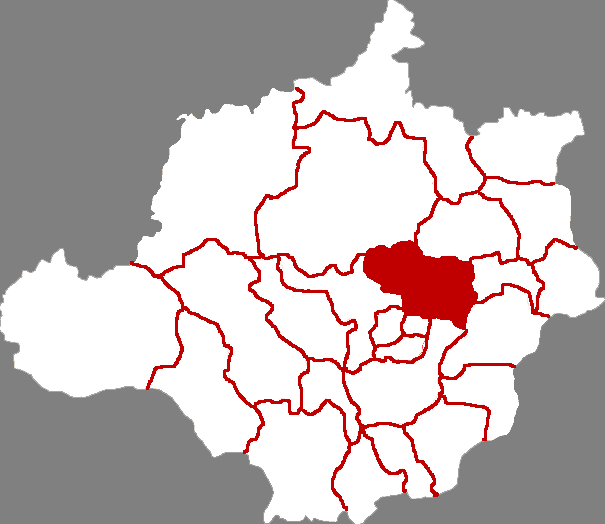
- Xushui in Baoding

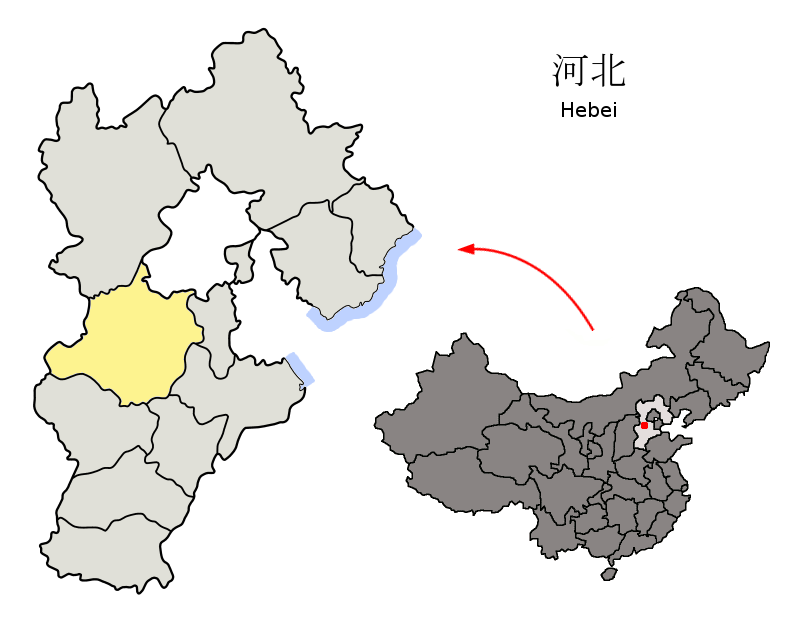
- Baoding in Hebei
- Coordinates: 39°01′08″N 115°39′22″E
- Country: People's Republic of China
- Province: Hebei
- Prefecture-level city: Baoding

Area
  - Total: 723 km^{2} (279 sq mi)

Population (2020)
  - Total: 604,275
  - Density: 836/km^{2} (2,160/sq mi)
- Time zone: UTC+8 (China Standard)

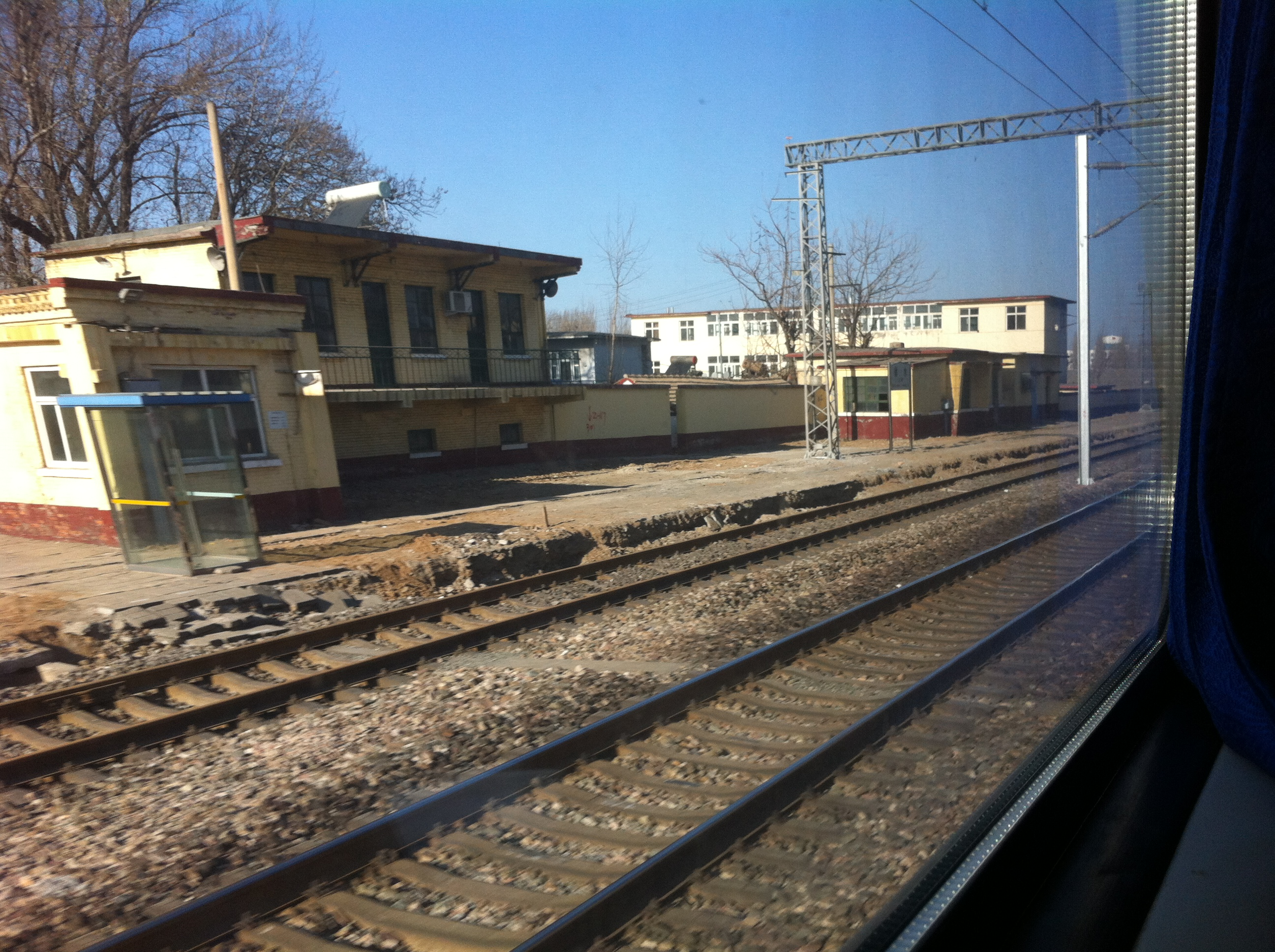
Xushui Railway Station on Beijing–Guangzhou Railway

Xushui District (simplified Chinese: 徐水区; traditional Chinese: 徐水區; pinyin: Xúshuǐ Qū) is a district of the city of Baoding, Hebei province, China.

== Administrative divisions ==
Towns:

- Ansu (安肃镇), Cuizhuang (崔庄镇), Dayin (大因镇), Suicheng (遂城镇), Gaolincun (高林村镇), Dawangdian (大王店镇), Caohe (漕河镇)

Townships:

- Dongshiduan Township (东史端乡), Liucun Township (留村乡), Zhengcun Township (正村乡), Humi Township (户木乡), Puhe Township (瀑河乡), Dongfushan Township (东釜山乡), Yilianzhuang Township (义联庄乡)

== Climate ==
Climate data for Xushui, elevation 13 m (43 ft), (1991–2020 normals, extremes 1981–present)
Month	Jan	Feb	Mar	Apr	May	Jun	Jul	Aug	Sep	Oct	Nov	Dec	Year
Record high °C (°F)	16.0 (60.8)	22.6 (72.7)	30.7 (87.3)	32.8 (91.0)	36.2 (97.2)	40.9 (105.6)	41.5 (106.7)	36.5 (97.7)	34.2 (93.6)	31.5 (88.7)	23.8 (74.8)	16.0 (60.8)	41.5 (106.7)
Mean daily maximum °C (°F)	2.4 (36.3)	6.7 (44.1)	13.7 (56.7)	21.0 (69.8)	26.7 (80.1)	31.5 (88.7)	32.1 (89.8)	30.3 (86.5)	26.6 (79.9)	19.8 (67.6)	10.4 (50.7)	3.8 (38.8)	18.8 (65.8)
Daily mean °C (°F)	−4.2 (24.4)	−0.2 (31.6)	6.9 (44.4)	14.4 (57.9)	20.3 (68.5)	25.2 (77.4)	26.9 (80.4)	25.3 (77.5)	20.1 (68.2)	13.1 (55.6)	4.3 (39.7)	−2.3 (27.9)	12.5 (54.5)
Mean daily minimum °C (°F)	−9.4 (15.1)	−5.6 (21.9)	0.8 (33.4)	7.8 (46.0)	13.6 (56.5)	19.1 (66.4)	22.4 (72.3)	21.0 (69.8)	14.8 (58.6)	7.6 (45.7)	−0.5 (31.1)	−6.9 (19.6)	7.1 (44.7)
Record low °C (°F)	−22.4 (−8.3)	−17.6 (0.3)	−11.0 (12.2)	−4.3 (24.3)	1.4 (34.5)	8.5 (47.3)	16.1 (61.0)	12.9 (55.2)	3.8 (38.8)	−4.2 (24.4)	−11.2 (11.8)	−21.5 (−6.7)	−22.4 (−8.3)
Average precipitation mm (inches)	2.6 (0.10)	6.1 (0.24)	8.9 (0.35)	26.1 (1.03)	32.7 (1.29)	59.1 (2.33)	158.0 (6.22)	112.7 (4.44)	57.1 (2.25)	24.5 (0.96)	12.8 (0.50)	2.6 (0.10)	503.2 (19.81)
Average precipitation days (≥ 0.1 mm)	1.6	2.2	3.2	4.5	6.2	9.1	12.5	10.4	7.1	4.9	3.1	1.7	66.5
Average snowy days	2.7	2.2	1.0	0.1	0	0	0	0	0	0	1.6	2.4	10
Average relative humidity (%)	58	52	50	54	60	62	75	81	75	69	68	62	64
Mean monthly sunshine hours	162.9	169.9	216.9	235.8	261.4	221.7	180.7	185.2	190.3	181.3	151.7	152.3	2,310.1
Percentage possible sunshine	54	56	58	59	59	50	40	44	52	53	51	52	52
Source: China Meteorological Administration
