= Xiakou, Gansu =

Xiakou 峡口镇
- Town
- Location in Gansu
- Coordinates: 35°31′28″N 104°2′53″E
- Country: People's Republic of China
- Province: Gansu
- Prefecture-level city: Dingxi
- County: Lintao County
- Time zone: UTC+8 (China Standard)

Xiakou (simplified Chinese: 峡口; traditional Chinese: 峽口; pinyin: Xiákǒu) is a town under the administration of Lintao County, Gansu, China. As of 2018, it has 13 villages under its administration.
