= Mazhan, Zhejiang =

Mazhan 马站镇
- Town
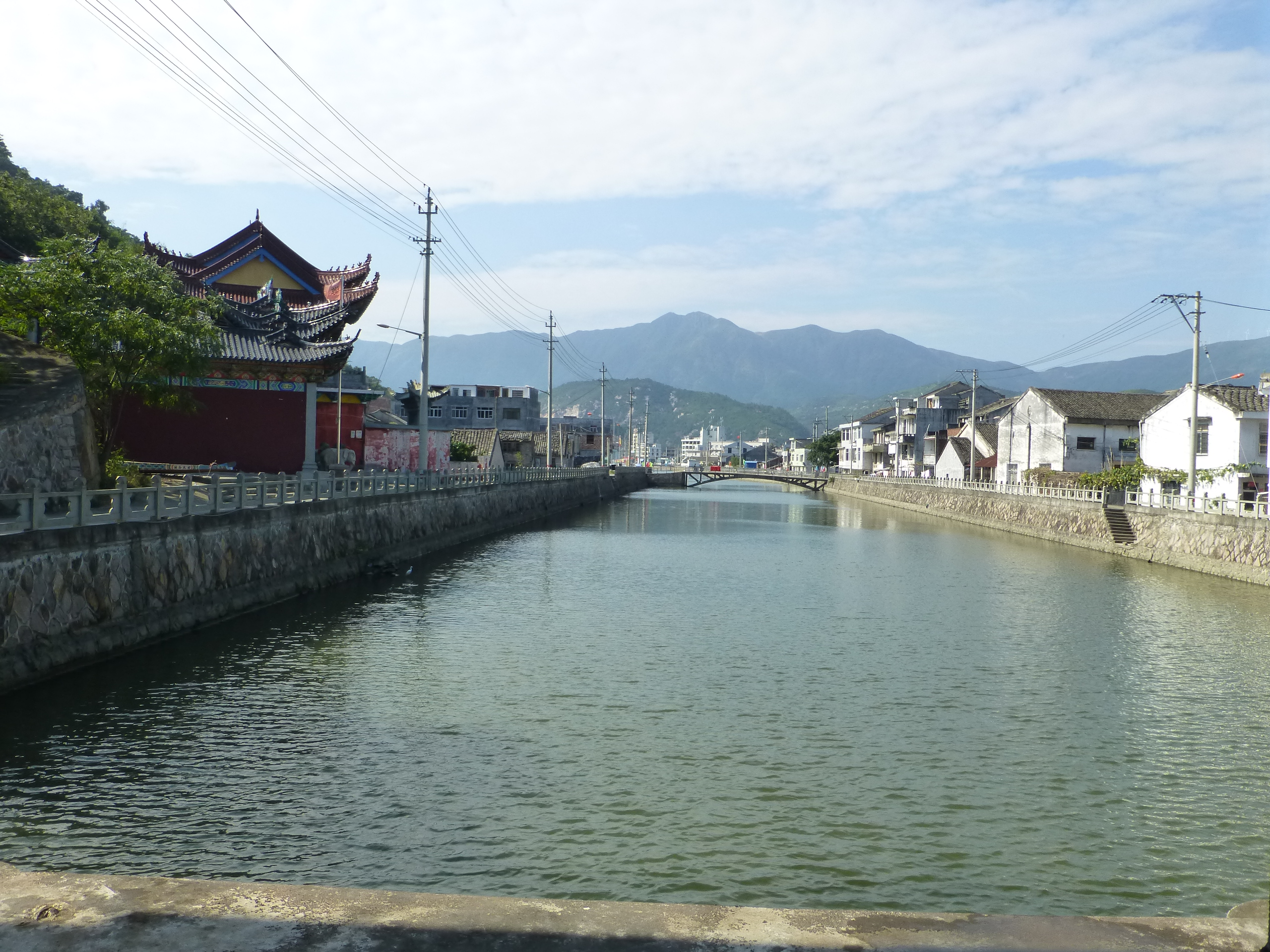
- Mazhan in 2015

- Location in Zhejiang
- Coordinates: 27°28′59″N 120°34′03″E
- Country: China
- Province: Zhejiang
- Prefecture-level city: Wenzhou
- County: Cangnan County

Mazhan (Chinese: 马站; pinyin: mǎzhàn) is a town under the jurisdiction of Cangnan County, Wenzhou City, Zhejiang Province, People's Republic of China.

== Administrative Divisions ==
As of 2020 the following village-level administrative divisions are under the jurisdiction of Mazhan:

Puyun Community (蒲云社区), Yuliaowan Community (渔寮湾社区), Pumen Community (蒲门社区), Qiaotou Village (桥头村), Houxian Village (后岘村), Xiafeng Village (霞峰村), Fengweishan Village (凤尾山村), Jinshan Village (金山村), Qipan Village (棋盘村), Cheling Village (车岭村), Zhongkui Village (中魁村), Xiakui Village (下魁村), Damenyang Village (大门洋村), Pufeng Village (蒲峰村), Ganxi Village (甘溪村), Ximenwai Village (西门外村), Wucheng Village (雾城村), Chengmending Village (城门顶村), Xiyu Village (西屿村), Zhongxiaogu Village (中小姑村), Chong'an Village (崇安村), Lanshan Village (兰山村), Caoyu Village (草屿村), Xing'ao Village (兴岙村), and Mazhan Fruit Farm Residential Zone (马站水果场生活区).
