= Dayin, Hebei =

Dayin 大因镇
- Town
- Location in Hebei
- Coordinates: 38°56′09″N 115°42′37″E
- Country: People's Republic of China
- Province: Hebei
- Prefecture-level city: Baoding
- County: Xushui
- Village-level divisions: 25 villages
- Elevation: 14 m (46 ft)
- Time zone: UTC+8 (China Standard)
- Area code: 0312

Dayin (Chinese: 大因; pinyin: Dàyīn) is a town in Xushui County in central Hebei province, China, located 10 kilometres (6.2 mi) southeast of the county seat, opposite G4 Beijing–Hong Kong and Macau Expressway, and around twice that north-northeast of downtown Baoding. As of 2011, it has 25 villages under its administration.

== See also ==
- List of township-level divisions of Hebei
