= Shanxi, Zhejiang =

Shanxi 珊溪镇
- Town
- Location in Zhejiang
- Coordinates: 27°40′05″N 120°03′08″E
- Country: People's Republic of China
- Province: Zhejiang
- Prefecture-level city: Wenzhou
- County: Wencheng County
- Time zone: UTC+8 (China Standard)

Shanxi (Chinese: 珊溪; pinyin: Shānxī) is a town in Wencheng County, Zhejiang province, China. As of 2020, it has 22 villages under its administration.

- Fuqiangxin Village (富强新村)
- Jietou Village (街头村)
- Jiewei Village (街尾村)
- Tanqi Village (坦岐村)
- Xiapaitan Village (下排坦村)
- Xinjian Village (新建村)
- Nanyang Village (南阳村)
- Zhuchuan Village (朱川村)
- Xiangkeng Village (项坑村)
- Lianxin Village (联新村)
- Wuxin Village (五新村)
- Yaping Village (雅坪村)
- Tangshan Village (塘山村)
- Songkeng Village (松坑村)
- Aoyang Village (鳌洋村)
- Zhennan Village (镇南村)
- Shanhu Village (珊湖村)
- Yunxi Village (云西村)
- Jingyuan Village (井源村)
- Wanli Village (万里村)
- Nanchuan Village (南川村)
- Huayang Village (华扬村)

== See also ==
- List of township-level divisions of Zhejiang
