= Dayin, Zhejiang =

Dayin 大隐镇
- Town
- Interactive map of Dayin
- Coordinates: 29°56′10″N 121°22′01″E
- Country: People's Republic of China
- Province: Zhejiang
- Sub-provincial city: Ningbo
- County-level city: Yuyao

Area
  - Total: 30.67 km^{2} (11.84 sq mi)
- Elevation: 12 m (39 ft)
- Time zone: UTC+8 (China Standard)
- Area code: 0574

Dayin (simplified Chinese: 大隐; traditional Chinese: 大隱; pinyin: Dàyǐn) is a town in northeastern Zhejiang province, China, located at the northeastern end of the Siming Mountains (四明山) 17 kilometres (11 mi) west of downtown Ningbo and just south of G92 Hangzhou Bay Ring Expressway. It is under the administration and located in the eastern end of Yuyao City, and as of 2011, it has one residential community (居委会) and 5 villages under its administration.

== See also ==
- List of township-level divisions of Zhejiang
