= Zaoxi =

Zaoxi 藻溪
- Town
- Location in Zhejiang
- Coordinates: 27°27′46″N 120°26′45″E
- Country: China
- Province: Zhejiang
- Prefecture: Wenzhou
- County: Cangnan

Zaoxi is a town under the jurisdiction of Cangnan County, Wenzhou City, Zhejiang Province, the People's Republic of China.

The Zaoxi management area was established in 1958, the commune was established in 1961, the town was established in 1984, and Tingnan, Fanzhi, and Erxiang were merged in 1992. Located in the middle of the county, 7.5 kilometers away from the county seat. It covers an area of 75.7 square kilometers and has a total population of 26,956 at the end of 2000. The Ling (xi)-jin (township) highway crosses the territory.

== Administrative divisions ==
Zaoxi Town administers the following village-level administrative division units

Xingkang Community, Jiubao Community, Jianguang Community, Jianguang Village, Xinrong Village, Shengtao Village, Xiashan Tiger Village, Zhoupuling Village, Gao'ao Village, Dingbutou Village, Jiubao Village, Yankeng Village, Xinyang Village Village, Zhe'ao Village, Dongxi Village, Pingshui Village, Jiazhenkeng Village, San'ao Village, Kuiqiao Village, Ding'ao Village, Ponan Village, Xingwen Village, Beishanpo Village, Fanzhi Village, Xia Village, Dongyang Village, Xia Yingcun, Liushi Village, Yuandian Village, Maoxu Village, Caobai Village, Fushan Village, Yinhu Village and Huishan Village.

== Tourism ==
As early as the 1980s, Wenzhou City's Zaoxi River was well known throughout China for its economy of "small fish ponds, small pastures, small tea gardens, small fruit gardens, and small forest farms". There are two municipal cultural relics protection units in Yuehuangping Taiji Cave and Guifang Ancient Bridge, six cultural and historical relics, including the Tomb of the New Fourth Army Martyrs, two municipal cultural preservation sites at Yongle Bridge, and the spiritual pagoda of Yangyuanhe Taoist priests.
