= Xiakou, Shaanxi =

Xiakou 峡口镇
- Town
- Location in China
- Coordinates: 32°52′13″N 107°35′15″E
- Country: People's Republic of China
- Province: Shaanxi
- Prefecture-level city: Hanzhong
- County: Xixiang County
- Time zone: UTC+8 (China Standard)

Xiakou (simplified Chinese: 峡口; traditional Chinese: 峽口; pinyin: Xiákǒu) is a town under the administration of Xixiang County, Shaanxi, China. As of 2018, it has two residential communities and 11 villages under its administration.
