= Qingyuan County, Zhejiang =

Qingyuan 庆元县 Kingyuan; Kingyüen; Kingyüan; Chingyüan
- County
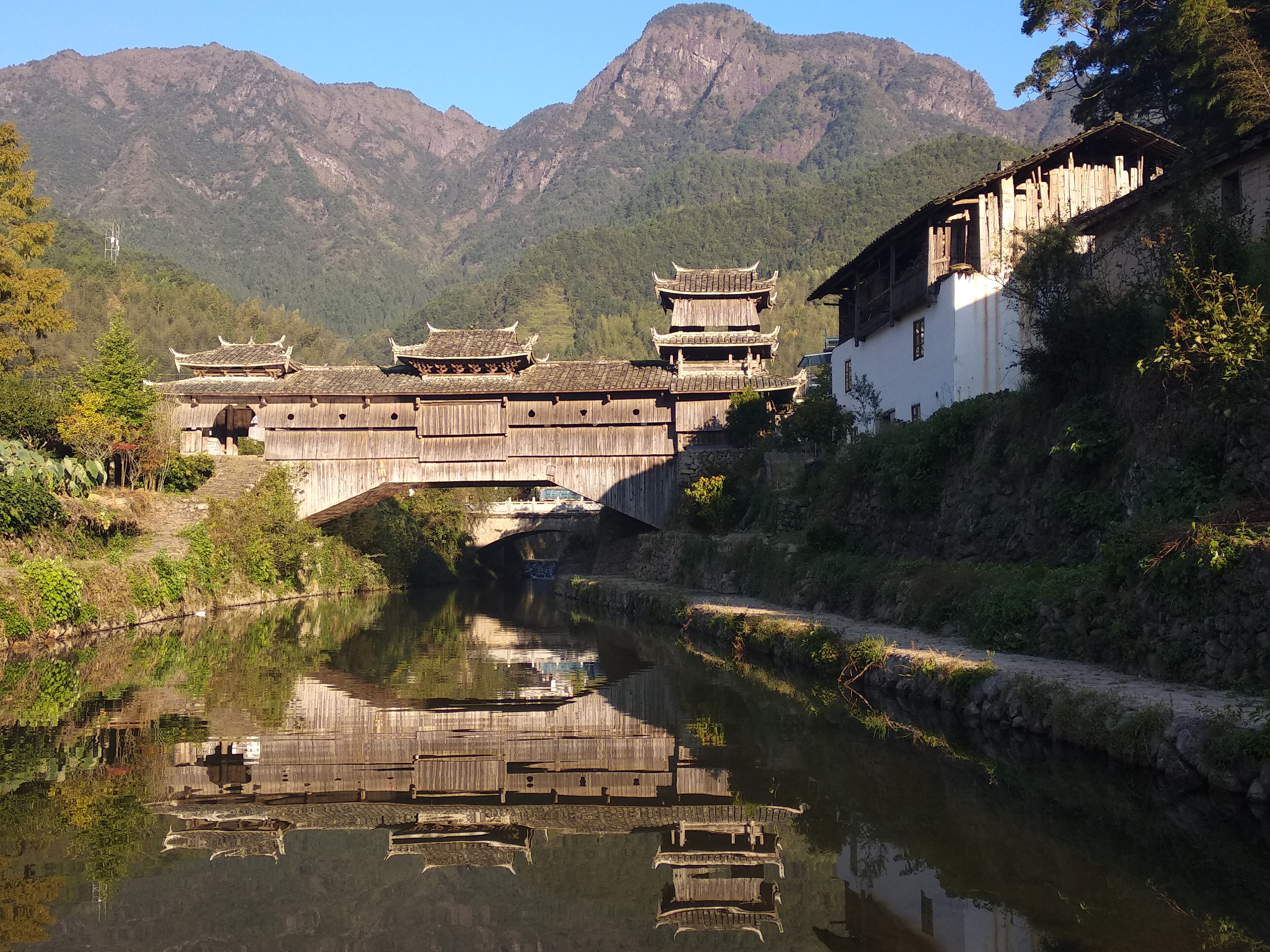
- Lishui Rulongqiao

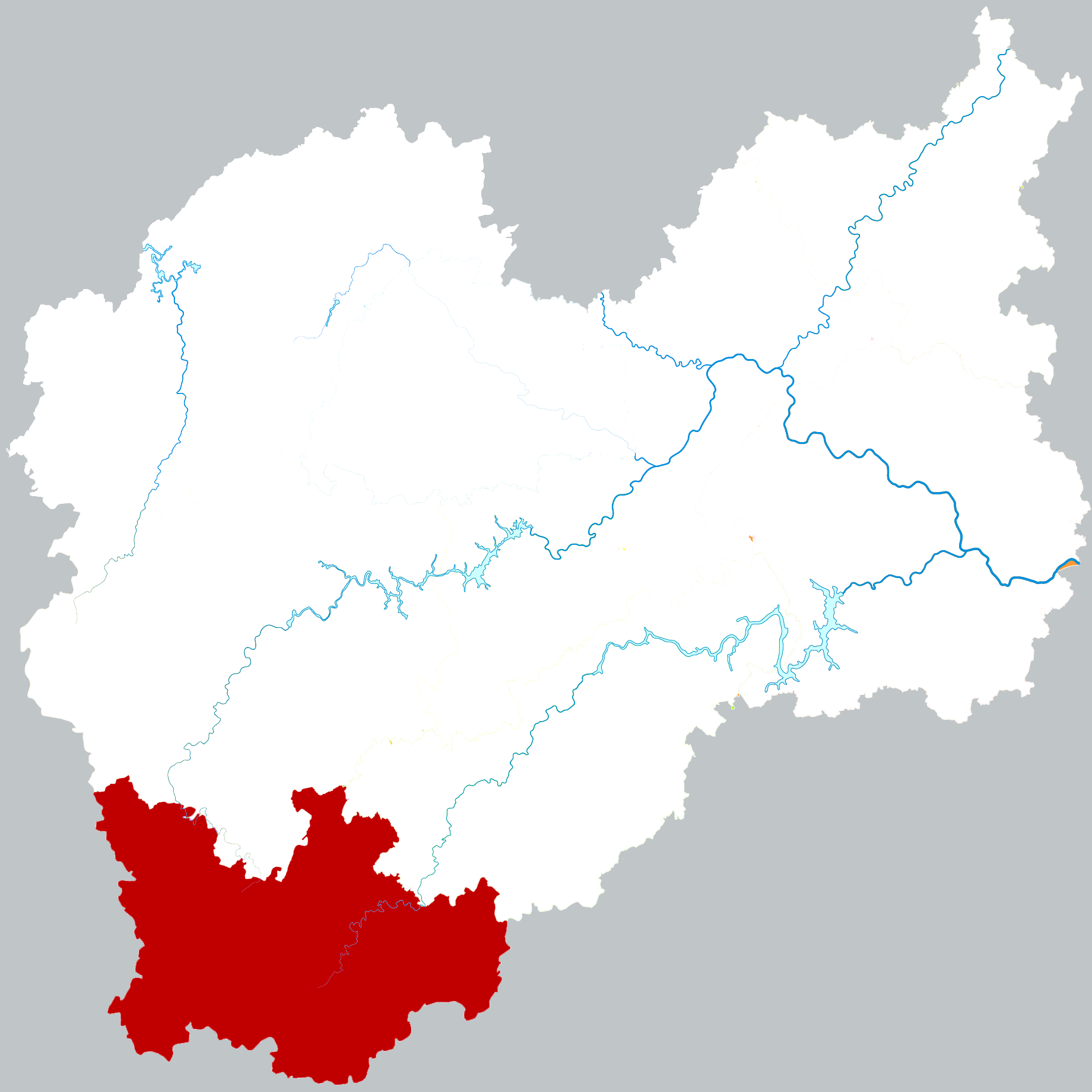
- Location of Qingyuan County within Lishui

- Location of the seat in Zhejiang
- Coordinates: 27°37′18″N 119°03′33″E
- Country: People's Republic of China
- Province: Zhejiang
- Prefecture-level city: Lishui
- County seat: Songyuan

Area
  - Total: 1,898 km^{2} (733 sq mi)

Population (2005)
  - Total: 198,440
  - Density: 104.6/km^{2} (270.8/sq mi)
- Time zone: UTC+8 (China Standard)
- Website: http://www.zjqy.gov.cn/

Qingyuan County (simplified Chinese: 庆元县; traditional Chinese: 慶元縣; pinyin: Qìngyuán Xiàn) is a county in Lishui, in southwestern Zhejiang province, China, bordering Fujian province to the southeast, south, and west. Its county seat is located at Songyuan Town (松源镇).

== Administrative divisions ==
Towns:

- Songyuan (松源镇), Huangtian (黄田镇), Zhukou (竹口镇), Pingdu (屏都镇), Hedi (荷地镇), Zuoxi (左溪镇), Xianliang (贤良镇)

Townships:

- Lingtou Township (岭头乡), Wudabao Township (五大堡乡), Yushang Township (淤上乡), Annan Township (安南乡), Zhangcun Township (张村乡), Longgong Township (隆宫乡), Jushui Township (举水乡), Jianggen Township (江根乡), Hehu Township (合湖乡), Baishanzu Township (百山祖乡), Longxi Township (龙溪乡), Guantang Township (官塘乡), Sishan Township (四山乡)

== Climate ==
Climate data for Qingyuan, elevation 401 m (1,316 ft), (1991–2020 normals, extremes 1981–2010)
Month	Jan	Feb	Mar	Apr	May	Jun	Jul	Aug	Sep	Oct	Nov	Dec	Year
Record high °C (°F)	27.1 (80.8)	30.8 (87.4)	32.8 (91.0)	34.0 (93.2)	35.9 (96.6)	36.9 (98.4)	41.1 (106.0)	40.2 (104.4)	37.6 (99.7)	35.2 (95.4)	31.6 (88.9)	25.4 (77.7)	41.1 (106.0)
Mean daily maximum °C (°F)	13.3 (55.9)	15.5 (59.9)	18.8 (65.8)	23.9 (75.0)	27.6 (81.7)	29.9 (85.8)	33.5 (92.3)	33.2 (91.8)	30.2 (86.4)	26.0 (78.8)	20.9 (69.6)	15.6 (60.1)	24.0 (75.3)
Daily mean °C (°F)	8.0 (46.4)	10.0 (50.0)	13.2 (55.8)	18.2 (64.8)	22.1 (71.8)	24.8 (76.6)	27.4 (81.3)	27.1 (80.8)	24.4 (75.9)	19.8 (67.6)	14.9 (58.8)	9.5 (49.1)	18.3 (64.9)
Mean daily minimum °C (°F)	4.4 (39.9)	6.3 (43.3)	9.4 (48.9)	14.0 (57.2)	18.0 (64.4)	21.3 (70.3)	23.0 (73.4)	22.9 (73.2)	20.2 (68.4)	15.2 (59.4)	10.6 (51.1)	5.5 (41.9)	14.2 (57.6)
Record low °C (°F)	−6.5 (20.3)	−5.2 (22.6)	−4.6 (23.7)	1.0 (33.8)	7.4 (45.3)	10.7 (51.3)	18.2 (64.8)	14.8 (58.6)	10.0 (50.0)	1.4 (34.5)	−3.6 (25.5)	−7.9 (17.8)	−7.9 (17.8)
Average precipitation mm (inches)	72.8 (2.87)	102.3 (4.03)	210.5 (8.29)	205.2 (8.08)	246.0 (9.69)	362.5 (14.27)	157.8 (6.21)	149.7 (5.89)	90.0 (3.54)	43.8 (1.72)	62.9 (2.48)	54.7 (2.15)	1,758.2 (69.22)
Average precipitation days (≥ 0.1 mm)	12.6	13.8	18.4	17.1	17.5	19.5	14.6	16.1	10.6	6.9	9.0	9.8	165.9
Average snowy days	0.9	0.8	0.2	0	0	0	0	0	0	0	0	0.4	2.3
Average relative humidity (%)	77	76	76	75	75	80	75	75	74	71	74	75	75
Mean monthly sunshine hours	99.8	94.3	99.9	120.5	130.3	117.1	214.5	203.2	175.4	173.1	135.4	129.5	1,693
Percentage possible sunshine	30	30	27	31	31	28	51	50	48	49	42	40	38
Source: China Meteorological Administration
