= Chang Hong =

6th-century BC Chinese scholar, politician, educator and astronomer

Chang Hong (simplified Chinese: 苌弘; traditional Chinese: 萇弘, also known as simplified Chinese: 苌宏; traditional Chinese: 萇宏, given name Shu Chinese: 叔, 582? BC - 492 BC) was a native of Zizhou in the ancient region of Shu. He was a famous scholar, politician, educator and astronomer in ancient China. He was well-versed in chronology, astronomy and was proficient in musical theory.

He was murdered by Zhao Jianzi. Zhuangzi claimed that his blood turned into green jade three years after his death. To this day, the Chinese still use the expression bixue (Chinese: 碧血; lit. 'jade green blood') to refer to the sacrifices or wrongful deaths of upright people.
