= Longwan, Wenzhou =

District of Wenzhou, Zhejiang, China

Longwan 龙湾区
- District
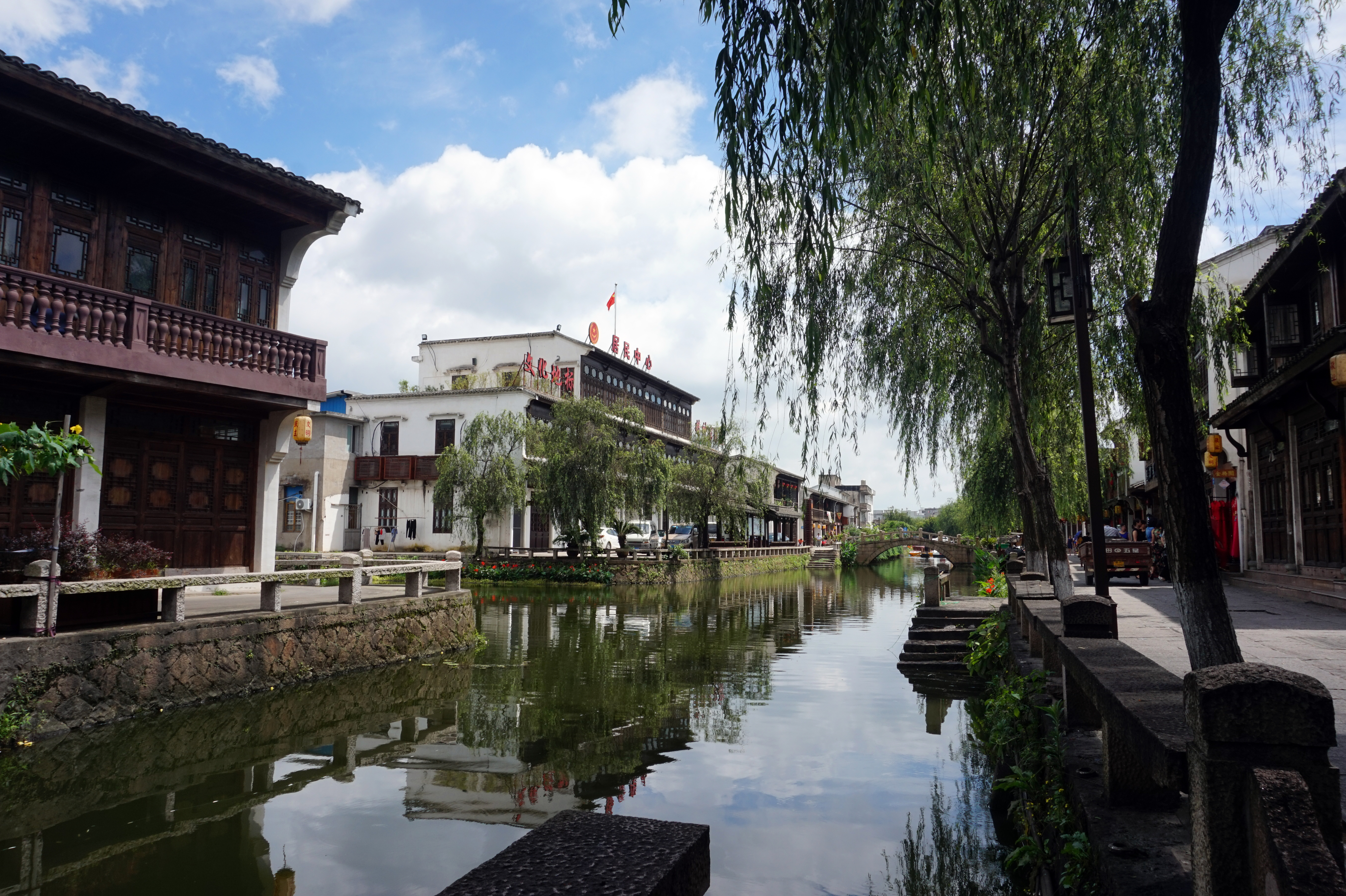
- Yongchang Fort

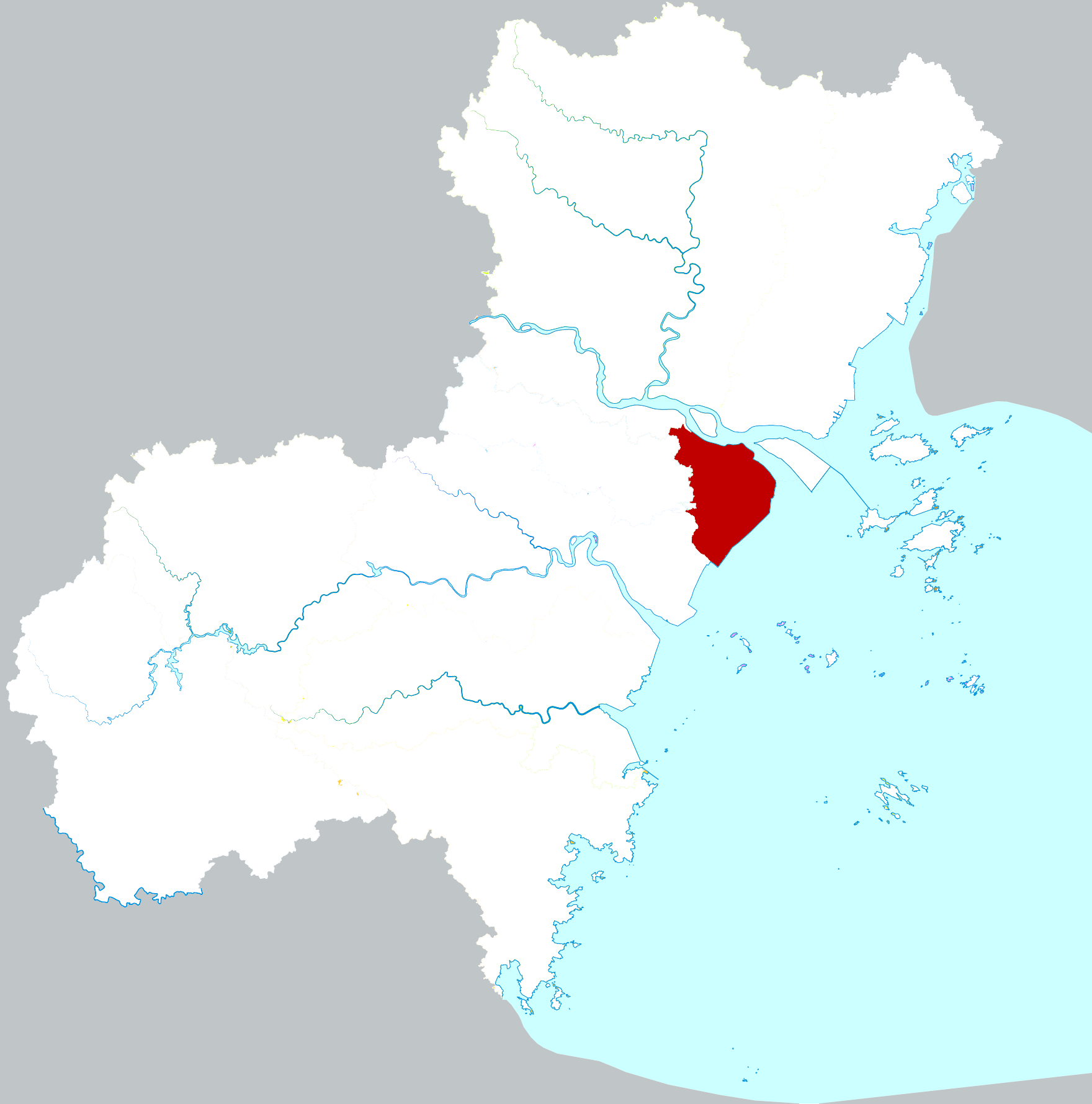
- Location of Longwan District within Wenzhou

- Location in Zhejiang
- Coordinates: 27°56′00″N 120°48′42″E
- Country: People's Republic of China
- Province: Zhejiang
- Prefecture-level city: Wenzhou

Area
  - Total: 319.46 km^{2} (123.34 sq mi)

Population (2020)
  - Total: 475,700
  - Density: 1,489/km^{2} (3,857/sq mi)
- Time zone: UTC+8 (China Standard)

Longwan District (simplified Chinese: 龙湾区; traditional Chinese: 龍灣區; pinyin: Lóngwān Qū) is an outlying district of the city of Wenzhou, Zhejiang province, China. It has a population of some 200,000 people in 2000 but grew to almost 750,000 people in 2010 due to rapid urbanization. It is famous for private enterprises, especially leather and the metal industry. Also, this district is one of the most important in Wenzhou.

== Administrative divisions ==
Subdistricts:

- Yongzhong Subdistrict (永中街道), Haibin Subdistrict (海滨街道), Yongxing Subdistrict (永兴街道), Puzhou Subdistrict (蒲州街道), Haicheng Subdistrict (海城街道), Zhuangyuan Subdistrict (状元街道), Yaoxi Subdistrict (瑶溪街道), Shacheng Subdistrict (沙城街道), Tianhe Subdistrict (天河街道), Lingkun Subdistrict (灵昆街道), Xinghai Subdistrict (星海街道)
