= Baishe Township =

Baishe Township 柏社乡
- Township
- Location in Zhejiang
- Coordinates: 29.33976°N 119.65011°E
- Country: People's Republic of China
- Province: Zhejiang
- Prefecture-level city: Jinhua
- County-level city: Lanxi
- Time zone: UTC+8 (China Standard)

Baishe Township (simplified Chinese: 柏社乡; traditional Chinese: 柏社鄉; pinyin: Bǎishè Xiāng) is a township under the administration of Lanxi in Zhejiang province, China. As of 2020, it administers the following 20 villages:

- Hongtangli Village (洪塘里村)
- Shuige Village (水阁村)
- Beishu Village (北舒村)
- Tangbian Village (塘边村)
- Qingzhushan Village (青珠山村)
- Qiaotou Village (桥头村)
- Xitanxu Village (溪滩徐村)
- Tuzhai Village (屠宅村)
- Lingtang Village (凌塘村)
- Xiajiangwu Village (下蒋坞村)
- Xinzhai Village (新宅村)
- Lingkou Village (岭口村)
- Xiachen Village (下陈村)
- Dashakou Village (大厦口村)
- Baijiu Village (白鸠村)
- Baijushe Village (百聚社村)
- Xinlihu Village (新里胡村)
- Zhongwang Village (钟王村)
- Fanghualong Village (方华垅村)
- Zhiyuan Village (芝园村)
