= Shangxi, Zhejiang =

Shangxi 上溪镇
- Town
- Interactive map of Shangxi
- Coordinates: 29°16′54″N 119°56′15″E
- Country: People's Republic of China
- Province: Zhejiang
- Prefecture-level city: Jinhua
- County-level city: Yiwu
- Time zone: UTC+8 (China Standard)
- Postal code: 322000
- Area code: 0579

Shangxi (Chinese: 上溪; pinyin: Shàngxī) is a town of Zhejiang province, China, located along the G60 Shanghai–Kunming Expressway to the west of Yiwu, which administers it, and the northeast of Jinhua.
