= Xiakou, Zhejiang =

Xiakou 峡口镇
- Town
- Location in Zhejiang
- Coordinates: 28°28′13″N 118°31′53″E
- Country: People's Republic of China
- Province: Zhejiang
- Prefecture-level city: Quzhou
- County-level city: Jiangshan
- Time zone: UTC+8 (China Standard)

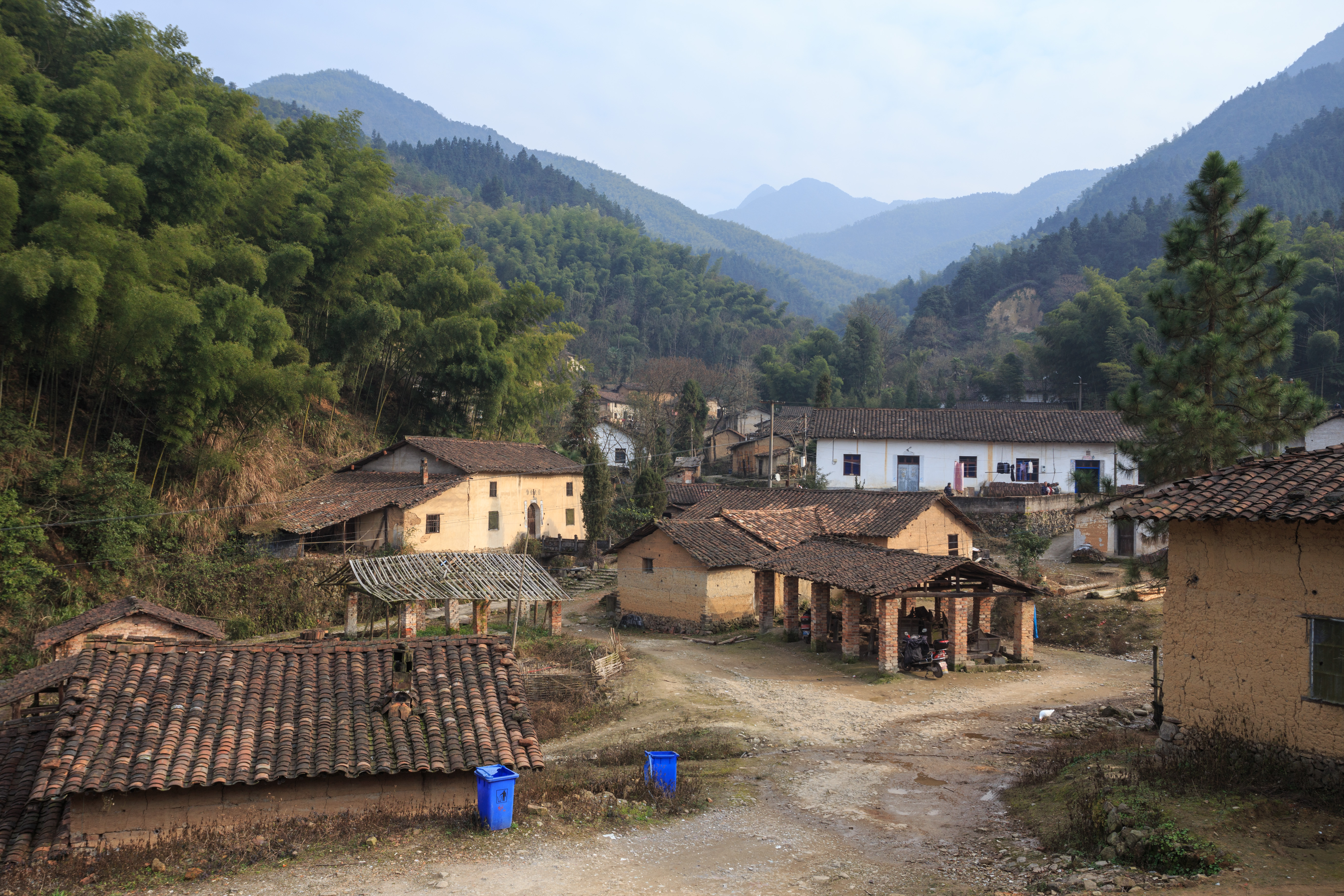
Sanqing mouth porcelain workshop

Xiakou (simplified Chinese: 峡口; traditional Chinese: 峽口; pinyin: Xiákǒu) is a town under the administration of Jiangshan, Zhejiang, China. As of 2018, it has one residential community and 18 villages under its administration.
