= Changhong Township =

Changhong Township 长虹乡
- Township
- Location in Zhejiang
- Coordinates: 29°14′11″N 118°13′31″E
- Country: People's Republic of China
- Province: Zhejiang
- Prefecture-level city: Quzhou
- County: Kaihua County
- Time zone: UTC+8 (China Standard)

Changhong Township (simplified Chinese: 长虹乡; traditional Chinese: 長虹鄉; pinyin: Chánghóng Xiāng) is a township under the administration of Kaihua County, Zhejiang, China. As of 2020, it has ten villages under its administration:

- Beiyuan Village (北源村)
- Fangcun Village (芳村村)
- Tiankeng Village (田坑村)
- Taoyuan Village (桃源村)
- Hongqiao Village (虹桥村)
- Xinghe Village (星河村)
- Shilichuan Village (十里川村)
- Xiachuan Village (霞川村)
- Zhenzikeng Village (真子坑村)
- Kukeng Village (库坑村)
