= Fusheng, Zhejiang =

Fusheng 富盛镇
- Town
- Location in Zhejiang
- Coordinates: 29.9520°N 120.7261°E
- Country: People's Republic of China
- Province: Zhejiang
- Prefecture-level city: Shaoxing
- District: Yuecheng District
- Time zone: UTC+8 (China Standard)

Fusheng (Chinese: 富盛; pinyin: Fùshèng) is a town under the administration of Yuecheng District, Shaoxing, Zhejiang, China. As of 2020, it administers Fusheng Residential Neighborhood and the following 14 villages:

- Fusheng Village
- Nijialou Village (倪家溇村)
- Wushi Village (乌石村)
- Shangwang Village (上旺村)
- Wenshan Village (文山村)
- Xiafeng Village (夏葑村)
- Lushan Village (辂山村)
- Yifeng Village (义峰村)
- Qingma Village (青马村)
- Fengwang Village (凤旺村)
- Hongshan Village (红山村)
- Zhugeshan Village (诸葛山村)
- Dongxi Village (董溪村)
- Jinxi Village (金溪村)
