= Longmen, Zhejiang =

Longmen 龙门镇
- Town
- Interactive map of Longmen
- Coordinates: 29°53′59″N 119°57′08″E
- Country: China
- Province: Zhejiang
- Sub-provincial city: Hangzhou
- District: Fuyang

Area
  - Total: 27.17 km^{2} (10.49 sq mi)
- Elevation: 80 m (260 ft)

Population (2008)
  - Total: 7,000
  - Density: 260/km^{2} (670/sq mi)
  - Hukou permits: 2,500
- Time zone: UTC+8 (China Standard)
- Postal code: 311408
- Area code: 0571
- Website: https://web.archive.org/web/20110629121110/http://lmz.fuyang.gov.cn/

Longmen (simplified Chinese: 龙门镇; traditional Chinese: 龍門鎮; pinyin: Lóngmén Zhèn) is a town of 7000 in Fuyang District, Hangzhou, northwestern Zhejiang province, People's Republic of China, located 17 kilometres (11 mi) south of the center of Fuyang District. The town lies south of the Fuchun River, at the foothills of the Xianxia Range, and oversees 11 administrative villages. Over 90% of its people are surnamed Sun.

== Cultural history ==
According to tradition, the Suns of Longmen are descendants of the third century warlord Sun Quan, who became emperor of the Three Kingdoms state of Wu. Sun Quan himself is said to have been born a short distance from Longmen, on an islet in the Fuchun River. A 1939 genealogy traces their lineage continuously back twenty six generations to a Song dynasty official. In the past, the Suns of Longmen were divided into ten sub-lineages and held joint grand ceremonies honouring their ancestors every spring and autumn, but this practice stopped after 1949.

Fifty years ago there were some sixty heritage buildings in Longmen, and about half of those are still standing today. Among them are ancestral halls, homes, pagodas and memorial arches - most of which have a history of over three hundred years. These structures are good examples of classical southern architecture and feature intricate wood carvings from Zhejiang folklore. The favourite decorative motifs used are from Three Kingdoms stories popular since the Song dynasty. ` The local theatrical performances, called the "Bamboo Horse Dance" are unique for their portrayal of Sun Quan as a hero. In traditional Three Kingdoms folklore, Sun Quan is normally seen as an ambivalent and often frustrated leader who is time and again bested by Liu Bei and his cunning strategist Zhuge Liang. At Longmen, the favourite plays are "Burning Red Cliffs", showing Sun Quan's defeat of Cao Cao at the Battle of Red Cliffs and "Burning the Linked Encampments", showing Sun Quan's defeat of Liu Bei at the Battle of Yiling.

Curiously, the great revolutionary statesman Sun Yat-sen, born in southern Guangdong province, can trace his ancestry to Longmen. His ancestors moved from Zhejiang to Fujian and then finally to Guangdong. The Sun clan genealogy in his native Cuiheng bears the title "Genealogical Register of the Sun Clan of Fuchun".
