= Tianzhong (disambiguation) =

Tianzhong is an urban township in Changhua County, Taiwan.

Tianzhong may also refer to:

- Tianzhong Mountain, a circle little hill
- Tianzhong railway station, a railway station on the Taiwan Railways Administration West Coast line
- Tianzhong Village (田中村), Checheng, Pingtung County, Taiwan
- Tianzhong Village (田中里), Longjing District, Taichung, Taiwan

== See also ==
- Tian Zhong (born 1956), a vice-admiral of the People's Liberation Army Navy (PLAN) of China
