= Chunjiang Subdistrict =

Chunjiang 春江街道
- Subdistrict

Chinese transcription(s)
  - Chinese: 春江街道
  - Pinyin: Chūnjiāng jiēdào
- Interactive map of Chunjiang
- Country: China
- Province: Zhejiang
- County-level City: Fuyang
- Prefecture: Hangzhou
- Time zone: UTC+8 (China Standard Time)

Chunjiang is a subdistrict of Fuyang, Hangzhou City in Zhejiang Province, China. The well-known Tianzhong Mountain lies to the south of Chunjiang.

== Administrative districts ==
Chunjiang has administrative jurisdiction over nine rural townships: Jianshe Village (建设村), Taiping Village (太平), Linjiang Village, (临江村), Chunjiang Village (春江) Zhongsha Village (中沙村), Bayi Village (八一村), Xinjian Village (新建村), Minzhu Village (民主村) and Shanjian Village (山建村).

== Industry and infrastructure ==
White board paper is manufactured in Chunjiang. The south bus station is a major hub of the Fuyang traffic network.
