= Fuyang, Hangzhou =

Fuyang 富阳区
- District
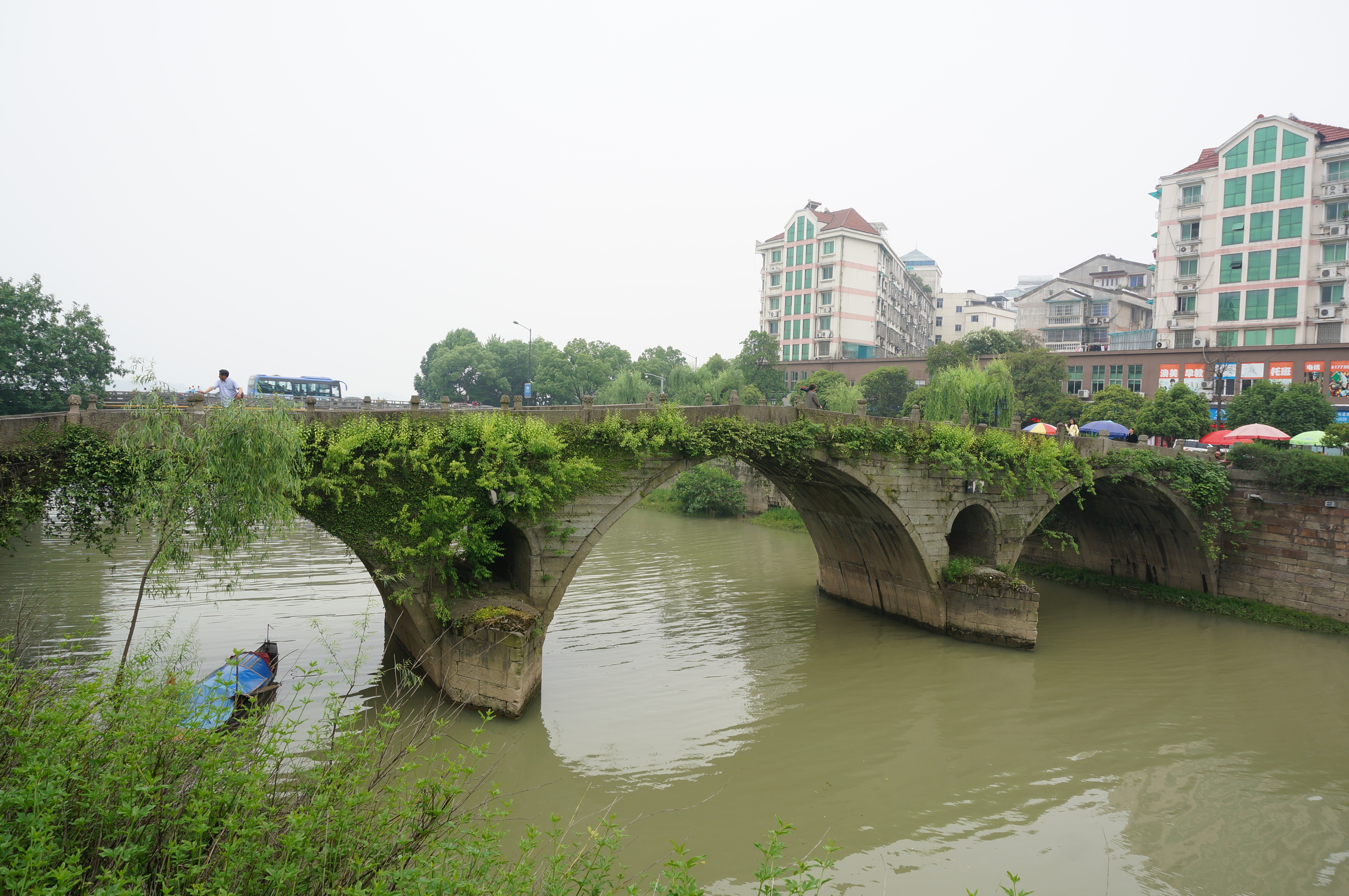
- Fuyang as seen from the left bank of the Fuchun River

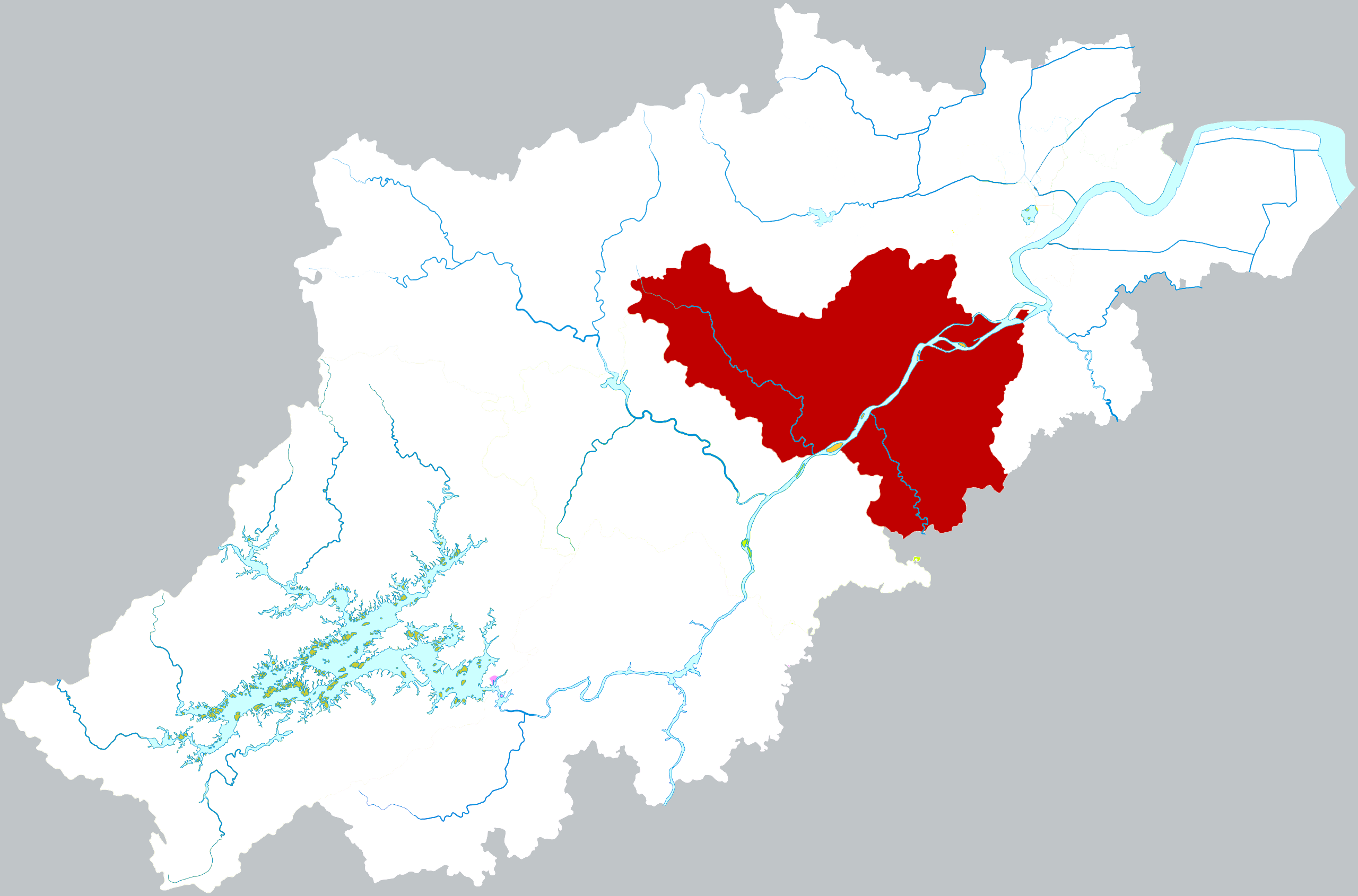
- Location of Fuyang District within Hangzhou

- Location in Zhejiang
- Coordinates: 30°03′N 119°57′E
- Country: People's Republic of China
- Province: Zhejiang
- Sub-provincial city: Hangzhou
- Township-level divisions: 4 subdistricts; 15 towns; 6 townships
- Municipal seat: Fuchun Subdistrict (富春街道)

Area
  - Total: 1,821.03 km^{2} (703.10 sq mi)

Population (2011)
  - Total: 653,800
  - Density: 359.0/km^{2} (929.9/sq mi)
- Time zone: UTC+8 (China Standard)
- Postal code: 311400
- Division code: FYF (Telephone code: 0571)
- GDP: 35.64 billion RMB (2009)
- Website: www.fuyang.gov.cn

Fuyang is a suburban district of Hangzhou, Zhejiang, China.

== History ==
Fuyang was founded as Fuchun (富春, Fùchūn) under the Qin dynasty in 221 BC. The same name was shared at the time by the nearby stretch of the Qiantang River. The name Fuyang began to be used intermittently from AD 394 onwards. Under the Southern Song, Fuyang was the birthplace of the scholar Zhou Mi in 1232.

Recent research has shown that the Ming dynasty Hongwu Emperor fled through Fuyang from Yuan dynasty forces during the closing years of that dynasty. Evidence of the pursuit has been found on the Tianzhong and Anding Mountains as well as in Yushan Village.

During an offensive against the rebels in Zhejiang at the time of the Taiping Rebellion (1850–1864), Imperial commander Zuo Zongtang laid siege to Hangzhou and gradually captured the surrounding towns, including Fuyang to the southwest. In the final assault, General Jiang Yili and French commander Paul d'Aiguebelle (德克碑) destroyed part of the walls and took the city by storm, before sacking it.

In the early 20th century Fuyang was a hub for paper and bamboo products with Fuyanese bamboo used for the ribbing in paper umbrellas produced in Hangzhou.

Nationalist forces fought numerous battles against the Imperial Japanese Army in Fuyang and Xindeng, then a separate administrative area, during the World War II Japanese occupation of China. In December 1937 neighboring Hangzhou fell to the Japanese army and in January 1939 Japanese and Chinese forces fought for control of Fuyang. In 1942 Japanese forces clashed with Nationalist troops for control of Xindeng during a Japanese offensive against Jinhua, the then capital of Zhejiang province. The United States Army Air Forces bombed Japanese positions in Fuyang in August 1943, reportedly inflicting hundreds of casualties. In early August 1945, Japanese troops launched an offensive from Fuyang and captured the neighboring centers of Tonglu, Xindeng, and Lin'an City.

In 2011, a serious storm caused damage to many buildings in Fuyang. On the 23 June, 457 farmhouses collapsed through storm damage, leading to compensation claims of more than 50,000 yuan. The seriousness of the catastrophe surpassed that of a 2009 typhoon in which 380 farmhouses suffered damage. The reconstruction cost the government a significant amount.

== Geography and climate ==
Fuyang has a total area of 1,831.22 km^{2} (707.04 sq mi) and is located at 30°3′N 119°57′E. The city extends 68.67 kilometres (43 mi) E‑W and 50.37 kilometres (31 mi) N‑S.

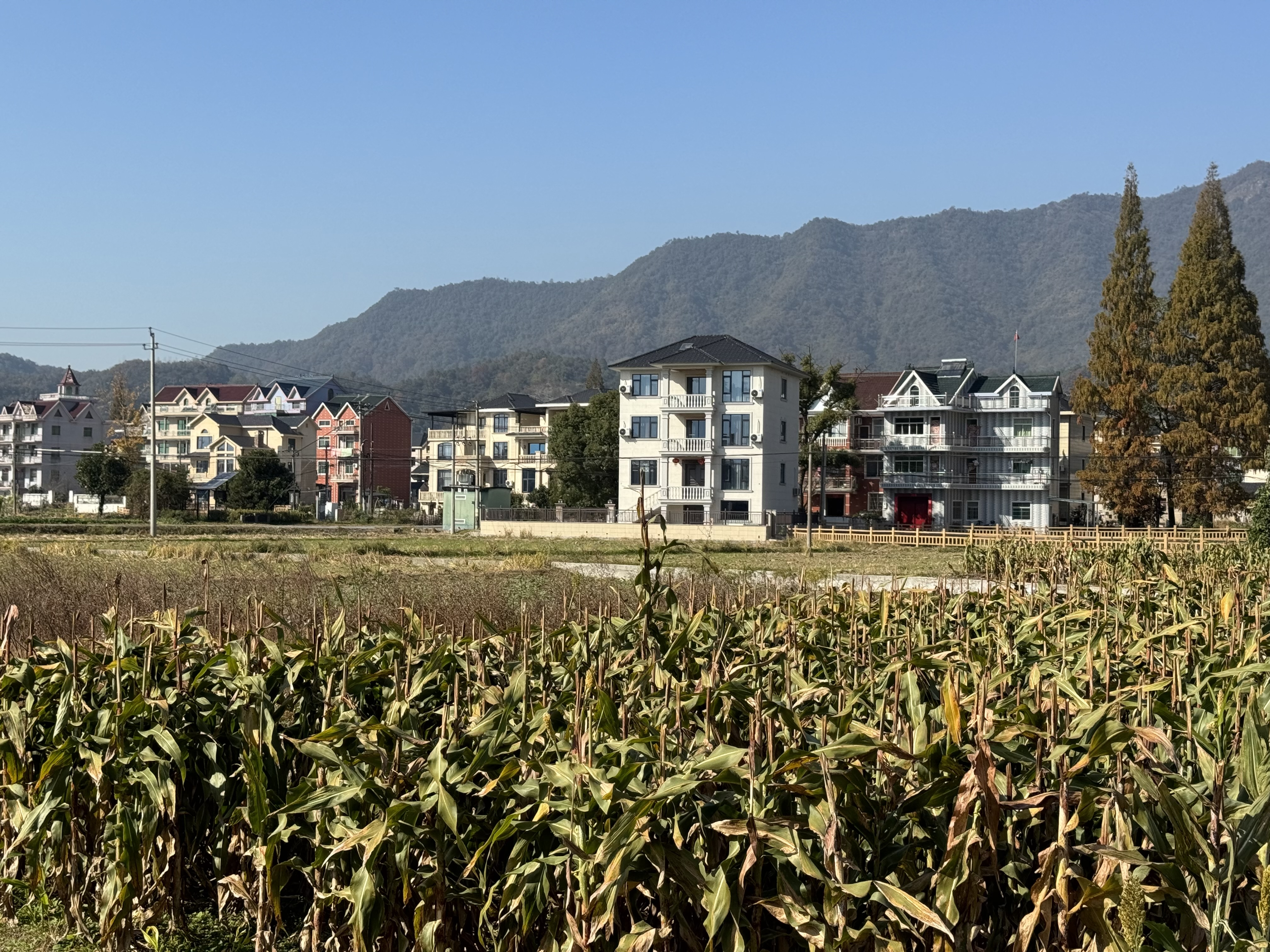
Tongzhou Island in the west of Fuyang

The area has many low mountains, hills, valleys, hills, basins, plains and other types of landscape. The low hilly area covers 1,385 square kilometres (535 sq mi) (75.9%) of the total area, while the plains account for 18.7% and water areas 5.4%.

Located in northwestern Zhejiang province, in 1994 Fuyang was administratively merged into Hangzhou. The city has several highways including the G320 national road, Hangxijing, as well as highways 05, 23, 19 and 14. Fuyang is 51 kilometres (32 mi) from Hangzhou and convenient transport makes it possible to reach Hangzhou Train Station and Hangzhou Xiaoshan International Airport within one hour. In 2012, 45 natural disasters occurred in Fuyang, the majority not serious, although eight people died in October. To the southeast of the city, mountains cover a total area of 309.1 square kilometres (119.3 sq mi), accounting for the 16.9% of the city and 22.3% of the total mountain area. The elevation in this area exceeds 500 metres (1,640 ft) while the relative height is more than 400 metres (1,312 ft).

The climate in Fuyang is temperate and humid subtropical monsoon during the spring and summer seasons. The annual average temperature is 16 °C (61 °F) with 1,460 millimetres (57.5 in) of precipitation.

Climate data for Fuyang, elevation 47 m (154 ft), (1991–2020 normals, extremes 1981–present)
Month	Jan	Feb	Mar	Apr	May	Jun	Jul	Aug	Sep	Oct	Nov	Dec	Year
Record high °C (°F)	23.3 (73.9)	28.4 (83.1)	34.3 (93.7)	34.4 (93.9)	36.2 (97.2)	38.7 (101.7)	41.3 (106.3)	42.2 (108.0)	40.3 (104.5)	34.9 (94.8)	31.5 (88.7)	24.4 (75.9)	42.2 (108.0)
Mean daily maximum °C (°F)	9.2 (48.6)	11.8 (53.2)	16.5 (61.7)	22.6 (72.7)	27.2 (81.0)	29.4 (84.9)	34.0 (93.2)	33.5 (92.3)	28.9 (84.0)	23.9 (75.0)	18.1 (64.6)	11.9 (53.4)	22.3 (72.1)
Daily mean °C (°F)	4.7 (40.5)	6.9 (44.4)	11.1 (52.0)	16.9 (62.4)	21.9 (71.4)	25.0 (77.0)	29.1 (84.4)	28.5 (83.3)	24.2 (75.6)	18.7 (65.7)	12.8 (55.0)	6.9 (44.4)	17.2 (63.0)
Mean daily minimum °C (°F)	1.6 (34.9)	3.4 (38.1)	7.2 (45.0)	12.6 (54.7)	17.7 (63.9)	21.6 (70.9)	25.3 (77.5)	25.0 (77.0)	20.8 (69.4)	14.9 (58.8)	9.1 (48.4)	3.3 (37.9)	13.5 (56.4)
Record low °C (°F)	−7.6 (18.3)	−7.3 (18.9)	−3.5 (25.7)	0.2 (32.4)	7.7 (45.9)	12.1 (53.8)	18.2 (64.8)	18.3 (64.9)	9.3 (48.7)	1.2 (34.2)	−3.5 (25.7)	−11.9 (10.6)	−11.9 (10.6)
Average precipitation mm (inches)	88.8 (3.50)	92.4 (3.64)	139.7 (5.50)	128.4 (5.06)	141.0 (5.55)	263.7 (10.38)	181.8 (7.16)	165.8 (6.53)	120.2 (4.73)	63.5 (2.50)	73.1 (2.88)	64.3 (2.53)	1,522.7 (59.96)
Average precipitation days (≥ 0.1 mm)	13.3	12.5	15.2	14.4	14.1	16.0	11.9	14.1	11.9	8.6	10.7	10.1	152.8
Average snowy days	3.5	2.2	0.7	0	0	0	0	0	0	0	0.1	1.5	8
Average relative humidity (%)	77	76	74	72	73	80	74	76	78	76	78	76	76
Mean monthly sunshine hours	96.7	98.3	122.5	144.3	158.2	127.0	210.9	195.2	141.1	142.8	117.8	112.9	1,667.7
Percentage possible sunshine	30	31	33	37	37	30	49	48	38	41	37	36	37
Source: China Meteorological Administration

=== Architecture ===
A significant percentage of historic Fuyang city was demolished by wars in the 1940s and China's modernization campaign that began in the 1980s. Many of the notable structures standing in Fuyang today are of recent construction.

The Fuchun River waterfront runs several kilometers along the left bank of the river and is a center for social gatherings and sightseeing. Yu Dafu Park is located on the riverfront.

The Fuyang International Trade Center Hotel (富阳国际贸易中心大酒店) is one of the most prominent structures in Fuyang. The five-star luxury hotel is situated on the left bank of the Fuchun River and was constructed with 320 million RMB in funding by the Zhejiang Sea & Land Holding Group Co., Ltd. The structure covers an area of 43,000 square metres (460,000 sq ft), has 27 floors, and is the tallest building in Fuyang.

=== Mountains ===
Fuyang is known for its scenic mountain views and has numerous notable mountains, including Longmen Mountain, Ting Mountain, Guanshan Mountain and others. Many of these mountainous areas serve as places for locals to relax.

- Guan Mountain (鹳山; 鸛山) is one of the best known tourist attractions in Fuyang. The mountain takes its name from its resemblance to a stork standing close to the nearby Fuchun River. Throughout history, the mountain has been deemed a place of seclusion with many historic figures including Li Bai, the well-known Chinese Tang dynasty poet and Song dynasty poet and politician Su Dongpo repairing to the area. The Songjun Villa was the home of Fuyang poet and author Yu Dafu (1896–1945) and his mother. This and other sites have been preserved by the Fuyang local government.
- Longmen Mountain (龙门山) is located in the village of Xingmeiwu, and at 1,100 metres (3,609 ft) is the highest mountain in Fuyang.
- Mount Tianzhong is also a noted feature.

=== Parks and zoos ===
- Xinsha Island (新沙岛) is a small island in the middle of the Fuchun river, with an area of 4.12 square kilometres (412.0 ha; 1,018.1 acres) and is surrounded by water and trees. West of the island is the largest natural freshwater swimming pool in east China. The beach area extends to 3,000,000 square metres (32,000,000 sq ft). The island is a popular tourist destination during the summer.
- Yu Dafu Park (郁达夫公园) is located near the Fuchun River and is a memorial to the writer Yu Dafu.
- Hangzhou Wild Animal World Zoo (杭州野生动物世界)is the largest zoo in eastern China.
- Enbo Park (恩波公园) is one of the oldest parks in Fuyang and is home to the historic Enbo Bridge.
- Changpukan is a well known location in Fuyang and includes Changpuling mountain.
- Guanshan Park (鹳山公园) is located within Fuyang city east of the river, and is a first-level national scenic area, known as the east China culture notable mountains.
- Huang Gongwang Forest Park (黄公望森林公园) was named after painter Huang Gongwang's well-known masterpiece Fu chun shan ju tu. It covers 333 hectares (823 acres) of which 96.5% is forest.
- Dong Wu Park (东吴公园) is on Jiangbin West Road and occupies 200,000 square metres (2,200,000 sq ft). Inside the park, there is a 50,000 square metres (540,000 sq ft) artificial lake. The design and the style of structure represent the culture of the Three Kingdoms period.

=== Surrounding Villages ===
- Longmen Village (龙门古镇景区) lies 16 kilometres (10 mi) from Fuyang and is a modern tourist attraction ranked as an AAAA‑class national scenic spot. The village is surrounded by mountains. It is named after an ancient poem written by the poet Yan Ziling (严子陵) when he visited here. Also, it is the homeland of Sun Quan, who was the king of Wu during the Three Kingdom period. A children's entertainment park is located near the Rainbow bridge.
- Jinzhu Village is located in Gaoqiao town.

One of the historic architectural features in Fuyang is Longmengkezhan (龙门客栈; 龍門客棧), noted for its local specialties and traditional snacks such as Shenxian Chicken and Youcaidofupi. People believe that the great Sun Quan set off from exactly here after his mother made him the special food of his hometown. Increasing numbers of tourists now visit this place of interest.

== Government ==
The chief political officer of the Fuyang Municipal People's Government is the Mayor of Fuyang. Under the mayor are deputy mayors and chief directors of municipal departments of the office and city bureau. In addition there is a local Chinese Communist Party Deputy Committee Secretary, a position currently occupied by Huang Haifeng (黄海峰). Huang also serves as the acting Mayor of Fuyang.

The executive vice mayor of Fuyang is Tong Dinggan. There are several vice mayors, including Fang Renzhen (方仁臻), Han Lu, Wang Xiaoding, Wang Shupin, Qiu Fushui, and Sun Jie. Jiang Jun (姜军) is the secretary of Fuyang district committee of the Communist Party.

== Administrative divisions ==
There are four subdistricts, 15 towns, and six townships under the city's administration:

=== Subdistricts ===
- Fuchun Subdistrict (富春街道)
- Lushan Subdistrict (鹿山街道)
- Dongzhou Subdistrict (东洲街道)
- Chunjiang Subdistrict (春江街道)

=== Towns ===
- Gaoqiao (高桥镇)
- Shoujiang (受降镇)
- Changkou (场口镇)
- Chang'an (常安镇)
- Wanshi (万市镇)
- Dongqiao (洞桥镇)
- Xukou (胥口镇)
- Xindeng (Sinteng) (新登镇)
- Luzhu (渌渚镇)
- Lingqiao (灵桥镇)
- Dayuan (大源镇)
- Changlü (常绿镇)
- Longmen (龙门镇)
- Lishan (里山镇)
- Yongchang (永昌镇)

=== Townships ===
- Huanshan Township (环山乡)
- Huyuan Township (湖源乡)
- Shangguan Township (上官乡)
- Yushan Township (渔山乡)
- Chunjian Township (春建乡)
- Xintong Township (新桐乡)

== Economy ==
The city's GDP in 2010 was 41.58 billion yuan while in December 2012 the consumer price index (CPI) increased by 0.9%

Fuyang, especially the Chunjiang Subdistrict, is an industrial center with over 200 paper mills and copper factories. Light industries including paper making and textiles industry constitute about eighty-percent of Fuyang's domestic industry. The paper-making industry was originally based in the small village of Liyuan with the best known product being strawboard.

Fuyang ranks in the top 100 towns in China for economic growth.

The first business village in Fuyang was Tangjiawu.

In May 1992, based on Fuyang's location, resources and industrial advantages, four centers were established in Fuchun Bay, Farmers City, Silver Lake and Takahashi to speed up the improvement of infrastructure, promote investment, and introduce a large number of projects driven by the tourism industry, real estate and other tertiary industries. Integration with Hangzhou's large scale transportation and travel infrastructure was also made a priority.

The Fuyang Economic Development Zone (富春江经济园区), formerly known as the Fuchun River Economic Development Zone was founded in 1992. It was the first provincial-level development zone approved by the People's Government of Zhejiang Province. In 2005, following a national audit it was upgraded to the Fuyang Economic Development Zone, and in 2012 it became the Fuyang National Economic and Technological Development Zone.

In 2002, the richest man in Fuyang was Jianyi Wang. He was also considered the 99th wealthiest Chinese by Forbes.

== Transportation ==
Fuyang District is served by Line 6 (Hangzhou Metro). Another mode of public transportation in Fuyang is an extensive public bus system. The main bus terminals are located at Dapuzha, New Transport Station, Maternity Care Hospital, Second Food Market, Guanshan Park, Jiangnan High school, and Fuyang Film station. The fare for Fuyang's ubiquitous taxis start at 7 yuan. There are two long-distance bus stations in Fuyang, Fuyang New Bus Station (富阳新车站) and Fuyang New South Bus Station (富阳新南车站). There are frequent buses running between Fuyang District and urban area of Hangzhou, and other nearby cities.

The major highway near Fuyang is the 3,695-kilometre (2,296 mi) Highway 320, which begins in Shanghai and ends in Yunnan. Lushan Street (鹿山街道) is the main throughway in Fuyang. Private vehicles traveling along the highways connecting Fuyang with Hangzhou and neighboring urban centers are subject to toll fees.

== Education ==
There are a number of primary and secondary schools located in Fuyang administered by the Fuyang Metropolitan Education Board. Xu Yichao (徐一超) is director general of the Fuyang Education Department. Among the schools that fall under the Fuyang Metropolitan Education Board's jurisdiction are:

=== Primary schools ===
- Yongxing Primary School (永兴小学)
- Fuyang No. 1 Primary School (富阳一小) Also known as Fuyang Experiment Primary School, it was founded in 1905 during the reign of the Qing dynasty Guangxu Emperor.
- Fuyang No. 2 Primary School (富阳二小)
- Fuyang No. 3 Primary school (富阳三小)
- Fuyang No. 4 Primary school (富阳四小)
- Fuyang No. 5 Primary school (富阳五小)
- Fuyang No. 6 Primary school (富阳六小)
- Fuyang No. 7 Primary school (富阳七小)
- Fuyang Dayuanzhen Central School (富阳市大源镇中心小学)
- Fuyang Chunjiang Central School (富阳市春江中心小学)
- Fuyang Wanshizhen Central School (富阳市万市镇中心小学)

=== Middle schools ===
- Fuyang Yongxing Middle School (永兴中学) has 42 classes, more than 2400 students and 160 teachers. The school includes various courses, especially for the study of English. Students have six classes every week as well as morning and evening English reading time. Every Wednesday afternoon, there are more than 70 clubs for students to participate in and expand their outlook. Every year the school has a summer and winter camp, which provide students with opportunities to study aboard.
- Fuchun Middle School (富春中学)
- Yudafu Middle School (郁达夫中学)
- Dongzhou Middle School (东州中学)
- Fuchun Third Middle School (富春三中)

=== High schools ===
- Fuyang High School, includes the Fuyang AP Center (富阳中学国际部; 富陽中學國際部). There are a total of almost 260 students who study at the Fuyang AP center, almost 60 students in grade 12, 70 students in grade 11 and 130 students in grade 10. Fuyang High School has sub-campuses, including Fuyang High School, Fuyang South River High school, Fuyang Yongxin Middle School, Fuyang Chunjiang Middle School and Fuyang High School AP Center. These five schools are all well known in Fuyang.
- Jiangnan High School
- Fuyang No. 2 High School (富阳二中; 富陽二中), includes an international China-Canada center.
- Xindeng High School (新登中学; 新登中學)
- Changkou High School (场口中学; 場口中學)
- Shiyan High School (实验中学; 實驗中學)
- Chengzhen Vocational School (富阳市城镇职业高级中学; 富陽市城鎮職業高級中學)
- Daqing Vocational School (大青职高; 大青職高)

=== College ===
- Fuyang Radio & Television University, also known as Fuyang dianda. (富阳广播电视大学/富阳电大; 富陽廣播電視大學/富陽電大)

Fuyang plans to build a college town in 2013.

== Local food ==
Fuyangese cuisine has a long history and is based on the culinary traditions of Zhejiang Province. Taste, color, and freshness are important for components of traditional Fuyanese dishes, as is the shape of the final product. Some notable Fuyanese dishes includes Fuchun River Shad (富春江鲥鱼), pork and vegetable dish called qianjiang rousi (钱江肉丝; 錢江肉絲)., Fuyangese roast duck (富阳烤全鸭; 富陽烤全鴨), You Deng Guo (油灯粿), sanshan chestnuts (三山板栗), and a Fuyanese version of tofu skin (豆腐皮). Local produce includes Anding Mountain watermelon (安顶山西瓜) Anding Mountain Yunwu Tea (安顶云雾茶; 安頂雲霧茶), both cultivated on the farm land of local Anding Mountain. There is also a local fruit called baiguo (白果).

== Culture ==
=== Painting ===
==== Dwelling in the Fuchun Mountains ====
Dwelling in the Fuchun Mountains is one of the top ten ancient masterpieces of China, created by Fuyang native Huang Gongwang. He began work on the painting in 1348 and took about three years to complete it then presented it to a Taoist priest as a gift in 1350. A century later, the painting was acquired by the Ming dynasty painter Shen Zhou (1427–1509). During the reign of the Chenghua Emperor (1465–1487), Shen Zhou sent the painting to an unnamed calligrapher to be inscribed. However, the son of this calligrapher seized the painting which, after a few changes of hands, reemerged on the market for sale at a high price. Unable to afford it, there was nothing Shen Zhou could do except to make a copy of the painting himself. This imitation by Shen Zhou has become the most well-known and acclaimed copy among all others.

Not long after he made the copy, Shen Zhou gave it to a bureaucrat friend named Fan Shunju (樊舜举; 樊舜舉). Fan Shunju then began to search for the authentic copy. When he found it, he bought it at a hefty price and invited Shen Zhou to inscribe it. Shen Zhou then noted down at the end of the scroll the story of how the painting was lost and found.

Over the following centuries, the painting passed through the hands of several owners, including Tan Zhiyi (谈志伊; 談志伊), Dong Qichang and Wu Zhengzhi (吴正志; 吳正志). When Wu Zhengzhi died, he passed the painting to his third son Wu Hongyu (吴洪裕; 吳洪裕), who loved the painting so much that when he went into seclusion, he left behind all valuables and only brought the painting and a copy of the Thousand Character Classic by Master Zhiyong (智永法师; 智永法師).

Wu Hongyu's nephew Wu Jing'an rescued the painting, which was however already aflame and torn into two. The smaller piece, also the beginning section, measuring 51.4 centimeters long, was subsequently known as The Remaining Mountain (剩山圖). After passing through the hands of numerous collectors, it came into the possession of Wu Hufan (吴湖帆; 吳湖帆), a painter and collector, during the 1940s. In 1956, it finally settled down in the Zhejiang Provincial Museum in Hangzhou.

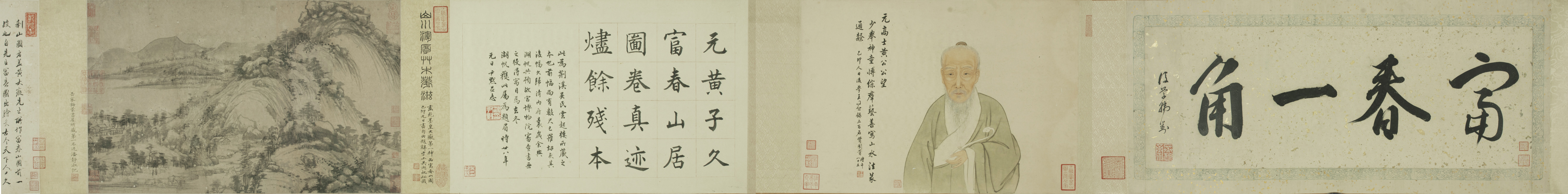
The first section of the painting, The Remaining Mountain, currently kept in the Zhejiang Provincial Museum in Hangzhou
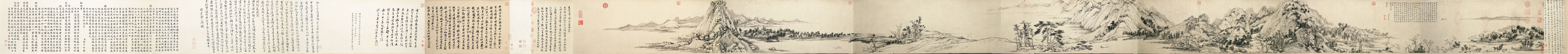
The second section, The Master Wuyong Scroll, currently kept in the National Palace Museum in Taipei

In 2011, in order to help rebuild the relationship between mainland China and Taiwan, the Dwelling in the Fuchun Mountain was shown in Taipei's National Palace Museum.

=== Cinema ===
The spy film Tianji(天机•富春山居图) will be released in June 2013. The film stars actress Lin Zhiling and actor Liu Dehua and some scenes were shot in Fuyang.

The 2019 film Dwelling in the Fuchun Mountains, by Gu Xiaogang is a drama taking place in Fuyang. The film follows a family throughout a year with a strong focus on the city and the Fuchun river.

=== Embroidery ===
Yongzhen Mao, the Director of Hunan Shaping Xiang Embroidery Museum, after two years planning invited the Chinese Crafts and Artisan Masters Aiyun Liu, Yan Shen, Yan Yang, Qiaoyun Chen, Min Yang, Ying Luo and over 30 other masters to recreate Dwelling in the Fuchun Mountains as a tapestry. Over five months, the embroidery was finished according to its original size. The work is 50 centimetres (19.7 in) high and 13 metres (43 ft) long, and uses threads of different shades of ink painting, in order to achieve "sub-colored ink" artistic effect. It is now stored in the National Museum of China.

=== Festivals ===
- Annual Fuchun River Sports Festival (富春江运动节; 富春江運動節) is an important part of the implementation of the five-year action plan to build the city's charismatic personality, expand its visibility and influence, and improve the city's image to enhance the quality of life.
- Banshan Peach Blossom Festival (半山桃花节; 半山桃花節) Since 2004, Fuyang has successfully held a Peach Blossom Festival.
- Tea-picking Festival (拔山高峰采茶节; 拔山高峰採茶節) People enjoy picking tea and to feel like a farmer.

== Notable individuals ==
Fuyang is the birthplace of many notable people dating back to Three Kingdoms period, including Li Zongmian, Li Tiao, and Lin Zhun.

=== Modern ===
- Yu Dafu, one of the greatest Chinese literary figures of the first half of the 20th century. Among his works are the novels "Sinking", and "Guoqu." In 1945 Yu was executed in Singapore by the Japanese military and he is considered to be a Chinese martyr in the fight against Japanese imperialism.
- Sun Jie, Chinese Olympic rower, was born in Fuyang on June 13, 1986.
- Hong Lei, the vice president of the Chinese Ministry of Foreign Affairs, was born in Fuyang in 1969 and attended Fuyang High School.
- Yu Feng, noted artist and a niece of Yu Dafu. She was born in Fuyang in 1916.
- Jiang Zhenghua, Vice-chairman of the Standing Committee of the Ninth National People's Congress, was born in Fuyang in 1937.
- Mai Jia, a writer and scriptwriter, was born in 1964. He was a recipient of the Mao Dun literature prize. He earned 28 million yuan in 2010, which made him the 15th wealthiest writer in China. Mai served in the army for seventeen years. Originally called Benxu Jiang, Mai Jia lives in Dayuan, Fuyang. He wrote the novels Jiemi, Ansuan, and Fengsheng.
- Xu Yulan (徐玉兰; 徐玉蘭), a noted Yue operatic.

=== Ancient ===
- Sun Quan, the king of Wu in the Three Kingdoms period, was originally from Longmen in Fuyang.
- Huang Gongwang was a noted painter who painted Dwelling in the Fuchun Mountains.
- Tang dynasty poet Luo Yin was originally from Longmen, Fuyang. He was born in AD 833.
- Li Zongmian, (李宗勉) was a chancellor in the Tang dynasty.
- Tang dynasty calligrapher Sun Guoting wrote the notable work Shu Pu (书谱; 書譜).
- Two well known prime ministers in feudal China, Dong Bangda and Dong Hao, were a father and son who originated from Fuyang.
