= Lishan =

Lishan may refer to:

- Lishán Didán, modern Jewish Aramaic language

== People's Republic of China ==
- Lishan District (立山区), Anshan, Liaoning
- Mount Li (骊山), near Xi'an
- Lishan, Sui County (厉山镇), town in Sui County, Suizhou, Hubei
- Lishan, Hunan (栗山镇), town in Xiangxiang
- Lishan, Shanxi (历山镇), town in Yuanqu County
- Lishan, Zhejiang (里山镇), town in Fuyang, Zhejiang
- Lishan, Meichuan, Wuxue, Huanggang, Hubei

== Iran ==
- Lishan, Iran, village in Mazandaran Province

== Taiwan ==
- Lishan (梨山), a village in Heping District, Taichung, included in the Tri-Mountain National Scenic Area

== People ==
- Lishan (official), Qing dynasty official.
