= Zhou Mi (scholar) =

- Chinese: 周密
Transcriptions
Standard Mandarin
- Hanyu Pinyin: Zhōu Mì
- Wade–Giles: Chou Mi

Courtesy Name
- Traditional Chinese: 周公謹
- Simplified Chinese: 周公谨
Transcriptions
Standard Mandarin
- Hanyu Pinyin: Zhōu Gōngjǐn
- Wade–Giles: Chou Kung-chin

Style Names
- Traditional Chinese: 周草窗
- Simplified Chinese: 周草窗
- Literal meaning: Zhou of the Grass Shutters
Transcriptions
Standard Mandarin
- Hanyu Pinyin: Zhōu Cǎochuāng
- Wade–Giles: Chou Ts'ao-ch'uang
- Traditional Chinese: 四水潛夫
- Simplified Chinese: 四水潜夫
- Literal meaning: Hidden One of the Four Waters
Transcriptions
Standard Mandarin
- Hanyu Pinyin: Sìshuǐ Qiánfū
- Wade–Giles: Szu Shui Ch'ien-fu
- Traditional Chinese: 弁陽老人
- Simplified Chinese: 弁阳老人
- Literal meaning: Old Man of Distinguished Yang
Transcriptions
Standard Mandarin
- Hanyu Pinyin: Biànyáng Lǎorén
- Wade–Giles: Pien-yang Lao-jên
- Traditional Chinese: 弁陽嘯翁
- Simplified Chinese: 弁阳啸翁
- Literal meaning: Roaring Senior of Distinguished Yang
Transcriptions
Standard Mandarin
- Hanyu Pinyin: Biànyáng Xiàowēng
- Wade–Giles: Pien-yang Hsiao-wêng

Zhou Mi (1232 – 1298), also known in Chinese by his courtesy name Zhou Gongjin and his style names Zhou Caochuang, Sishui Qianfu, Bianyang Laoren, and Bianyang Xiaoweng, was a Chinese scholar-official of the Southern Song and Yuan Empires.

== Life ==
Zhou Mi's family was a prominent one from Jinan and Qizhou in the Song Empire's Jingdong Circuit (now Shandong province, China), having served in government office for six generations before him. His great-grandfather Zhou Bi fled south with the emperor after the Fall of the Northern Song Dynasty in AD 1127 and was rewarded with the position of vice-censor, enabling him to establish a sprawling estate in Wucheng (now Huzhou) north of the new imperial capital Lin'an in Liangzhe Circuit (now Hangzhou, Zhejiang).

Zhou was born in Fuyang, where his father Zhou Jin was serving as the local magistrate, on the 21st day of the 5th lunar month in 1232. The family returned to Wucheng at the end of his father's term three years later but continued to travel extensively throughout the region. In 1246, he accompanied his father to a new post overseeing Quzhou, where he met several prominent scholars and artists, and at age 20 he passed the entrance exam to the capital's Imperial Academy. He avoided the subsequent imperial exam for the jinshi degree and took a secondary one instead, relying on his family connections for his eligibility for government office. Having secured that, he seems to have traveled and enjoyed his affluent life for several years thereafter before finally beginning to serve in 1261.

As a scholar-official in his own right, he served in a series of positions in what is now Zhejiang, China, and the surrounding areas. He began his work under the Song as an assistant (muliao) to Ma Guangzu (t 馬光祖, s 马光祖, Mǎ Guāngzǔ; 1200–1270), the prefect of Lin'an and pacification commissioner (t 安撫司, s 安抚司, ānfǔsī) for Zhexi Circuit (浙西, Zhèxī), the Song territory around the capital. In 1263, he was commissioned to oversee Jia Sidao's land reform project in Piling (now Changzhou) but quickly resigned his post owing to his filial duty to care for his dying mother. He later worked for the imperial treasury in Jiankang (now Nanjing); was a clerk at the transportation office (t 運司掾, s 运司掾, Yùnsīyuàn) for Liangzhe, covering both Zhexi and neighboring Zhedong (t 浙東, s 浙东, Zhèdōng); served at the Lin'an Public Pharmacy; and, in 1274, worked at the capital's reserve granary. He was appointed magistrate for Yiwu Prefecture in 1276, but may have not even reached it before it was surrendered to the Mongols after the fall of Lin'an in the 3rd lunar month.

During Song's conquest by the Mongol Empire, his family's property in Wuxing had been looted and burned, so Zhou moved to Lin'an, most likely to property held by his wife's relatives. Greatly distraught by the Mongol conquest and by the Tibetan Buddhist desecration of the Song imperial tombs under the Tangut monk and official Yang Lianzhenjia (Chinese: zh:楊璉真珈, Yáng Liǎnzhēnjiā; Tibetan: རིན་ཆེན་སྐྱབས་, Rin-chen-skyabs) in 1285, he is said to have wrote poetry compulsively during this period, although those works have been lost.

By this point he had become famous for his ci and shi poetry and as a connoisseur of Han art and literature. The artist Zhao Mengfu composed and illustrated Autumn Colors on the Que and Hua Mountains as a gift to him in 1296. Zhou died in 1298.

== Works ==
Zhou's c. 1280 or 1290 Antiquities of the Martial Forest (t 《武林舊事》, s 《武林旧事》, Wǔlín Jiùshì) is a 10-juan account of the Southern Song capital Lin'an. It is an important source for the Southern Song, especially its popular culture, and for the history of various Chinese performing arts.

His Rustic Talk from East of Qi (t 《齊東野語》, s 《齐东野语》, Qídōng Yěyǔ) is a 20-juan popular history of the Song Dynasty, partially based upon notes compiled by his father and grandfather.
