= Huyuan Township, Hangzhou =

Huyuan 湖源
- Township
- Huyuan Township
- Interactive map of Huyuan
- Coordinates: 29.8132°N 119.9510°E
- Country: China
- Province: Zhejiang
- Sub-provincial city: Hangzhou
- County-level city: Fuyang
- Township: Huyuan
- Time zone: UTC+8 (China Standard)

Huyuan (Chinese: 湖源; pinyin: Húyuán) is a village under the administration of Fuyang City, Zhejiang, located to the south of Fuyang.

== See also ==
- List of township-level divisions of Zhejiang
