= Autumn Colors on the Que and Hua Mountains =

1296 Chinese painting

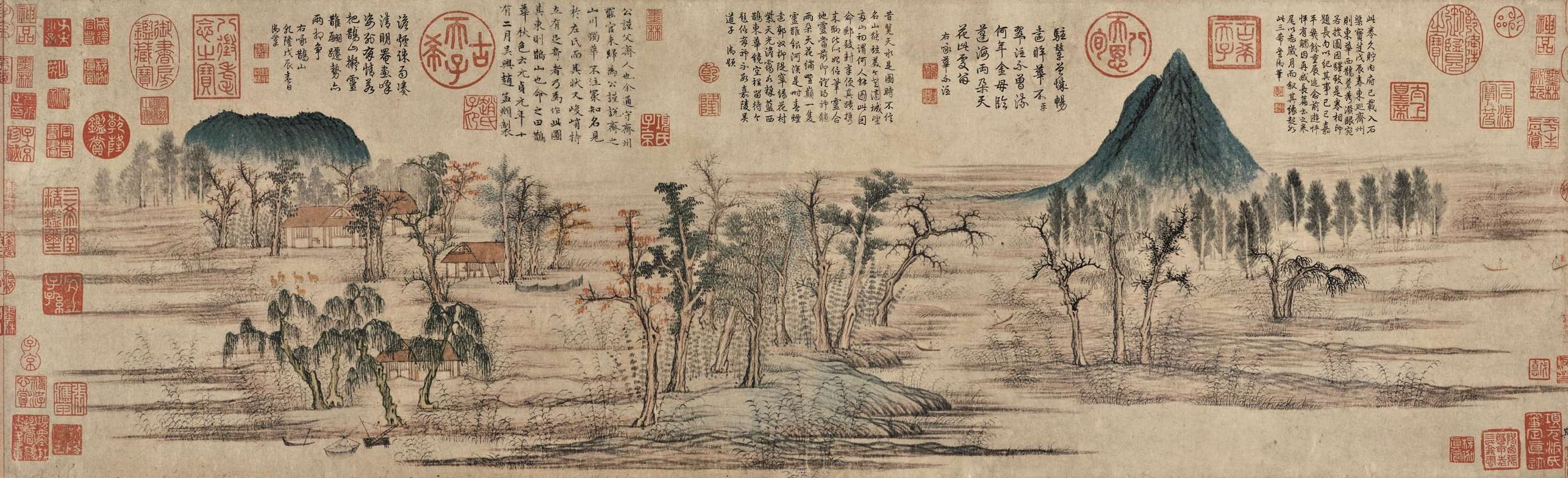
- Artist: Zhao Mengfu
- Year: 1296
- Medium: Ink and color on paper
- Dimensions: 28.4 cm × 93.2 cm (11.2 in × 36.7 in)
- Location: National Palace Museum, Taipei

Autumn Colors on the Que and Hua Mountains
- Traditional Chinese: 《鵲華秋色圖》
- Simplified Chinese: 《鹊华秋色图》
- Literal meaning: Depiction of Autumn Colors on Que and Hua
Transcriptions
Standard Mandarin
- Hanyu Pinyin: Què-Huá Qiūsètú
- Wade–Giles: Ch'üeh-Hua Ch'iu-sê-t'u

Autumn Colors on the Que (Note: The name Que is also sometimes given as "Qiao") and Hua Mountains is a 1296 silk painting by the Yuan dynasty painter and scholar-official Zhao Mengfu. It depicts the Que and Hua Hills in a wetland environment near Jinan in what is now Shandong province, China.

== Background ==
Zhao Mengfu was a Chinese calligrapher, painter, and scholar-official during the Yuan dynasty. He served as the vice-governor of the Jinan Circuit from 1292 to 1295 before resigning, possibly due to political tensions following the death of Kublai Khan and the ascension of his grandson Temür Khan. After staying in Dadu (the Yuan capital) for a year, he returned to his home of Wuxing in Jiangsu. After his return, Zhao painted a landscape painting for Zhou Mi, a scholar-official who had ancestry from Shandong but had never been able to visit the region himself.

== Description ==
Autumn Colors on the Que and Hua Mountains is a landscape painted in ink and colors on a paper handscroll. The main portion of the painting measures 28.4 cm × 93.2 cm (11.2 in × 36.7 in), while the rest of the scroll includes a 99.6 cm (39.2 in) introductory segment and 320.2 cm (126.1 in) of trailing material.

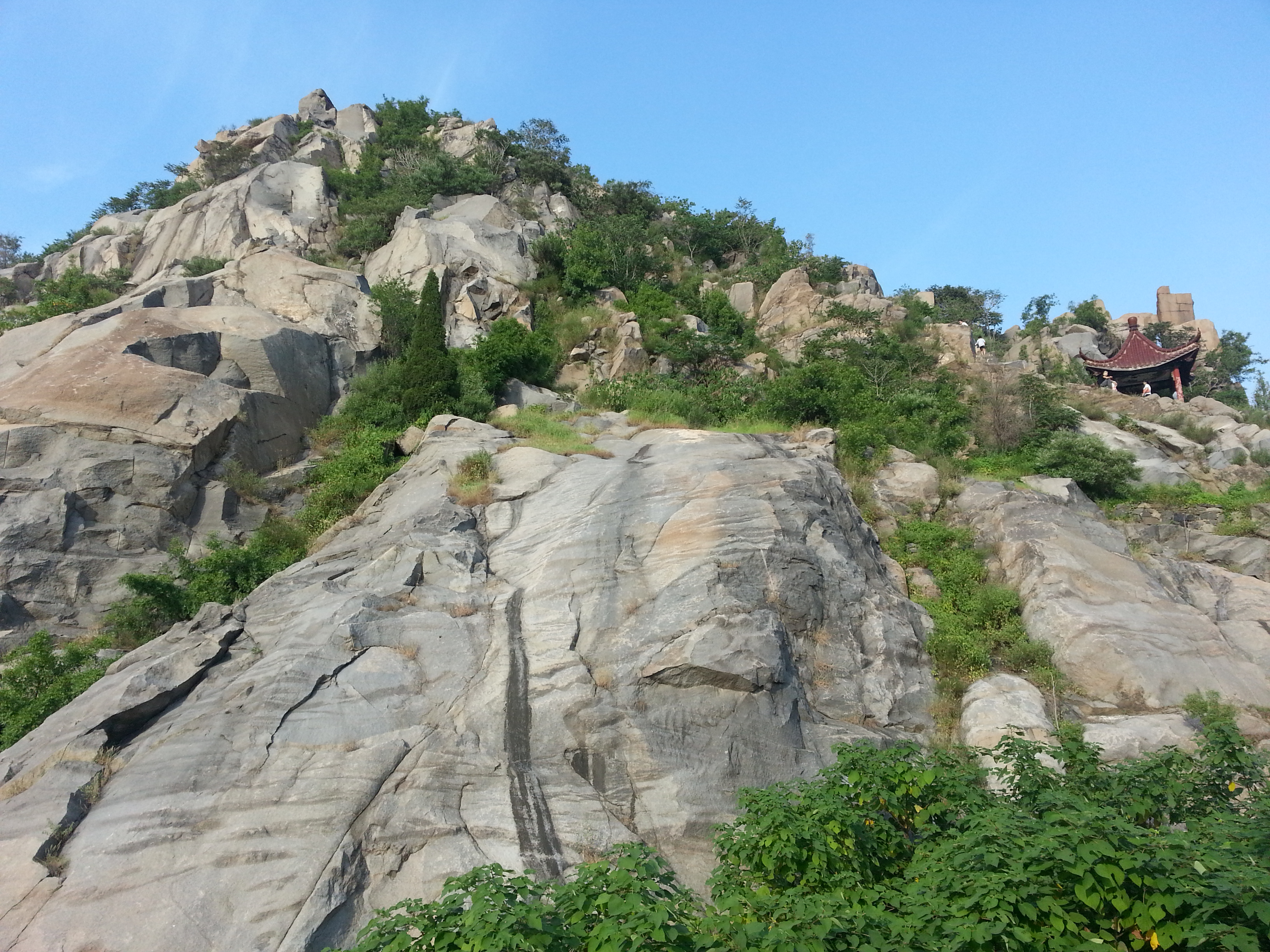
Que Hill (also known as Qiao Mountain)

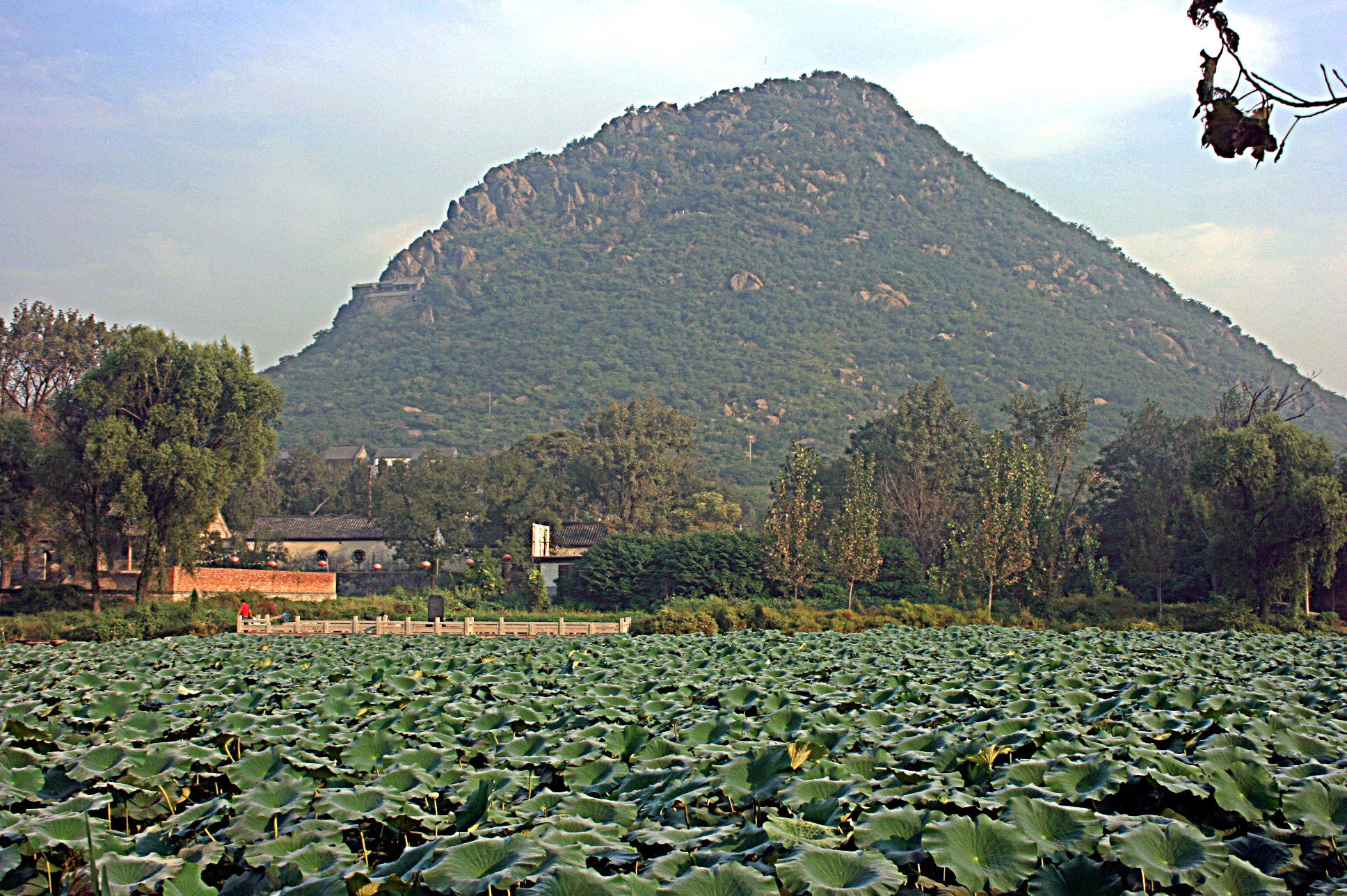
Hua Hill

The painting shows a wetland environment near Jinan dominated by two prominent hills: the loaf-shaped Que Hill to the left (west) and the sharp, triangular Hua Hill to the right (east). Many different trees (including pines and willows) are depicted throughout the piece, in front of and between the mountains. Some of the trees are without leaves, while others display their autumn leaf colors. A small cluster of houses is seen at left. Near this stand a herd of goats, as well as several villagers in scenes of daily life. Fishermen are shown in several small boats throughout the piece. The wetland environment featured in the painting was taken over by the Yellow River in 1852.

Reinforcing the idyllic nature of the piece, Zhao painted it in a deliberately archaic style. His use of texture patterns is similar to that of the 10th century artists Dong Yuan and Juran, while the twisted tree trunks recall those of Li Cheng. However, unlike the dramatic and monumental landscape paintings of that period, it depicts a relatively simple and quiet scene.

Five blocks of Chinese text are written in the sky above the scene. One of these is by Zhao himself and includes his signature. The remainder are notes added much later by the 18th-century Qianlong Emperor of the Qing dynasty.

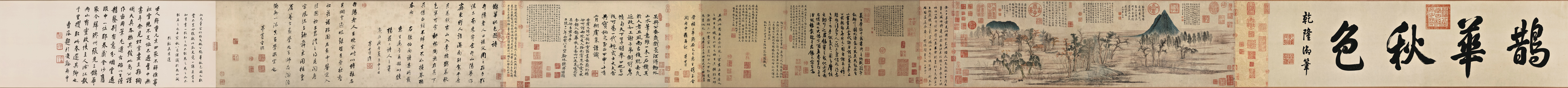
The full Autumn Colors scroll, starting from the right

== Legacy and later renditions ==
The painting attracted widespread acclaim from later Chinese artists and scholars. Many imitation pieces have been made after Zhao's original over the following seven centuries. These include a loose interpretation by the 15th century painter Yao Shou, and a now-lost variation by the 16th century Wen Zhengming which added a city wall and more distant hills. In 1602, Dong Qichang wrote that he received Zhao's painting as a gift from Xiang Deming, the grandson of the painter and art collector Xiang Yuanbian. Dong made a version of the painting, which itself was subject to various imitations, some by noted 17th century artists such as Lan Ying and Yun Shouping. These versions show a proportionally shorter Hua Hill.

In 1734, the Yangzhou painter Fang Shishu created The Autumn Colors on the Que and Hua Mountains after Zhao Mengfu and Dong Qichang, based on Dong's rendition which he had borrowed from the wealthy salt merchant Ma Yuegang. Ma, his younger brother Ma Yuelu, and the scholar and painter Feng Zhenguan wrote poems in praise of the painting, which were then inscribed around the piece. This rendition of the painting is now in the collection of the Phoenix Art Museum. Modern renditions of Zhao's original include a painting by the 20th century artist Wu Hufan.
