= Fuyang High School =

School in Hangzhou, China

Coordinates: 30°03′02″N 119°57′46″E

Fuyang High School (Chinese: 富阳中学) is a resident high school for seniors located in Fuyang, Zhejiang, China. It is known for its high academic standards and achievements through such means as providing native English speakers as English teachers, as well as sending Chinese English teachers to western countries for immersion in language training.

The school also trains its students to have an international outlook, and its teachers help prepare the students for life in the West. Fuyang High School maintains good sister school relations with schools across the world, and has excellent Chinese-Western relations.

== History ==
Fuyang High School was established in September 1942. The school has over three thousand students, ranging in age from 16 to 18. It was a former host for the Dipont AP Center. In January 1996, the school was approved by the Zhejiang Education Committee as one of the first-class schools in the province.

Fuyang High School is located in Hangzhou, in the province of Zhejiang.

== See also ==
- Education in China
- Fuyang, Zhejiang
