= Lishan, Zhejiang =

Lishan 里山镇
- Town
- Interactive map of Lishan
- Coordinates: 30°03′01″N 120°03′44″E
- Country: People's Republic of China
- Province: Zhejiang
- Sub-provincial city: Hangzhou
- County-level city: Fuyang
- Village-level divisions: 5 villages
- Elevation: 14 m (46 ft)
- Time zone: UTC+8 (China Standard)
- Area code: 0571

Lishan (Chinese: 里山; pinyin: Lǐshān) is a town under the administration of Fuyang City, Zhejiang, People's Republic of China, located on the southern (right) bank of the Fuchun River 10 kilometres (6.2 mi) east of downtown Fuyang and 22 km (14 mi) south-southwest of Hangzhou's West Lake. As of 2011, it has five villages under its administration.

== See also ==
- List of township-level divisions of Zhejiang
