= Hua Hill =

Hill in Jinan, Shandong, China

- Hua Fu Zhu Hill
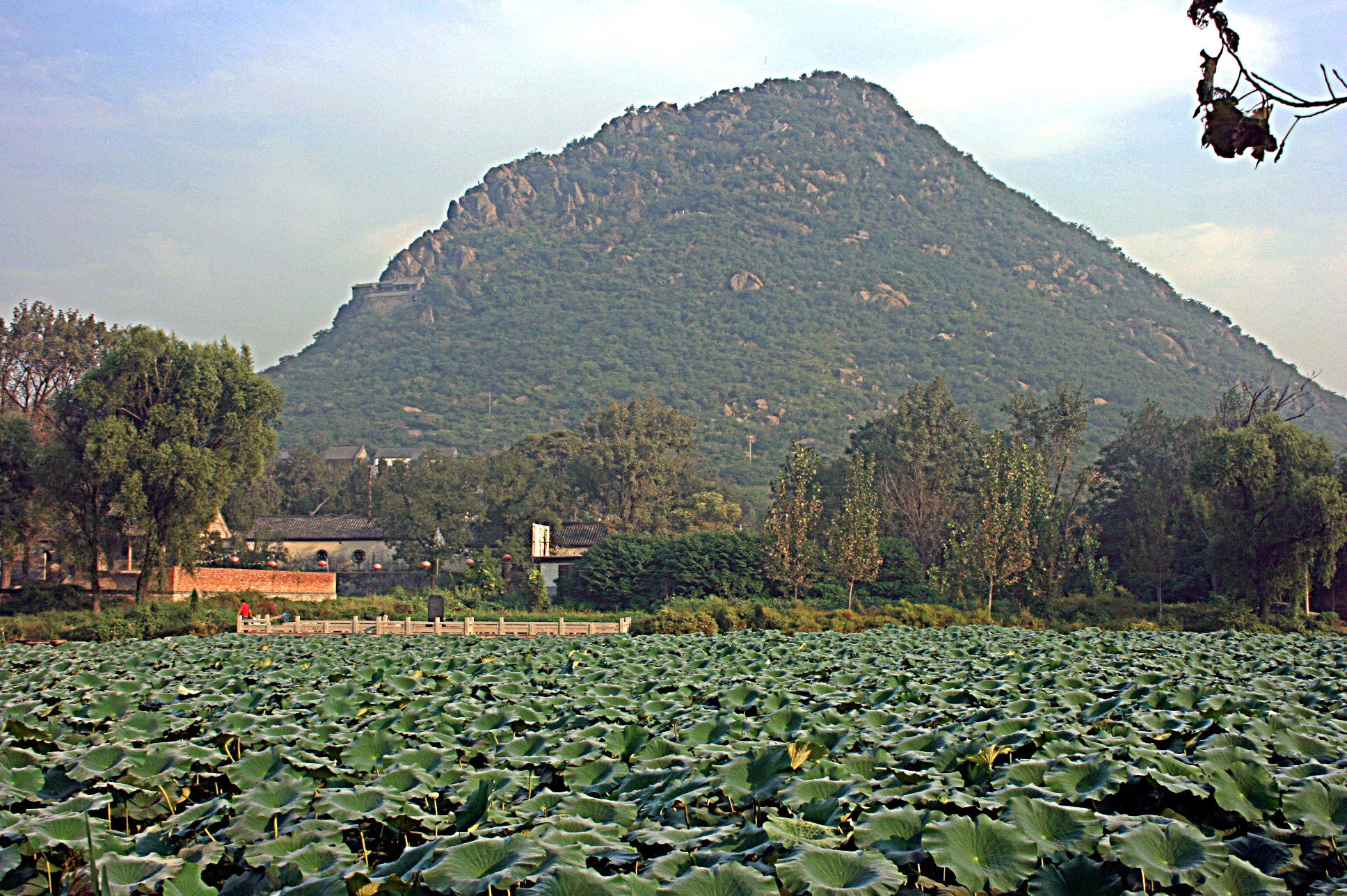
- View of Hua Hill from the south; the fence in front encloses the Hua Spring. Behind the spring lies the Huayang Palace.

Highest point
- Elevation: 197 m (646 ft)
- Listing: Nine Solitary Hills of Jinan
- Coordinates: 36.7286°N 117.0638°E

Naming
- Native name: 华山

Geography
- Location within Shandong
- Location: China • Jinan, Shandong Province

Geology
- Mountain type: Hill
- Rock type: Gabbro (辉长岩)

Climbing
- Easiest route: Stone stairway on the south flank

Hua Hill (Shandong) (simplified Chinese: 华山; traditional Chinese: 華山; pinyin: Huà Shān) is a solitary cone-shaped hill in the lower Yellow River valley, located at the northeastern edge of the city of Jinan, Shandong Province, China. The hill is known for its cultural and historical significance as well as for its natural environment. It has been an inspiration for Chinese artists for many centuries and was the site of the Battle of An, a major battle fought during the Spring and Autumn period.

== Name ==
The name Huà Shān is sometimes spoken as Huá Shān and can be translated literally as "Flowery Hill" or "Splendid Hill". The first character of the name (华) has long been used as a literary rather than political synonym for China itself. The second character of the name (山) is used for mountains and hills, irrespective of their size. The name Huà Shān (华山) as well as the near homophone Huā Shān (花山, literally "Flower Mountain") are both common names in Chinese geography. In particular, Hua Hill is not to be confused with Mount Hua in Shaanxi Province. Hua Hill is also known as Hua Fu Zhu Hill (Chinese: 华不注山; pinyin: Huá Fu Zhù Shān; lit. 'Flower Bud in the Water Hill').

== Hill ==
Hua Hill is one of the "Nine Solitary Hills" (Chinese: 九座孤山; pinyin: Jiǔ Zuògū Shān) in the Yellow River valley within and to the north of Jinan City; the other eight hills are (names used during the Qing dynasty): Woniu Hill (Chinese: 卧牛山; pinyin: Wòniú Shān), Que Hill (Chinese: 鹊山; pinyin: Què Shān, literally "Magpie Hill", located about 2.5 kilometers north of the Hua Hill on the other side of the Yellow River), Biao Hill (Chinese: 标山; pinyin: Biāo Shān, meaning "Landmark Hill"), Fenghuang Hill (Chinese: 凤凰山; pinyin: Fènghuáng Shān, Fenghuang is the "Chinese Phoenix"), Northern Maan Hill (Chinese: 北马鞍山; pinyin: Běi Mǎ'ān Shān, meaning "Northern Horseshoe Hill"), Su Hill (Chinese: 粟山; pinyin: Sù Shān, literally "Grain Hill"), Kuang Hill (Chinese: 匡山; pinyin: Kuāng Shān, literally "Basket Hill"), and Yao Hill (Chinese: 药山; pinyin: Yào Shān, literally "Medicine Hill").

The hill has an elevation of 197 meters above sea level; its slopes are covered with large smooth rocks and bushy vegetation growing in the clefts between them. The foot of the hill is flanked by small villages on the eastern and western side. To the east and south, the hill is also surrounded by a crescent-shaped row of ponds. A flight of stone stairs has been laid up the southern flank of the hill to the summit.

In the times before the Northern Song dynasty, Hua Hill was surrounded by a lake known as the "Magpie Hill Lake" (Chinese: 鹊山湖; pinyin: Què Shān Hú), named for the nearby Magpie Hill. Since Hua Hill appeared to float on the waters of the lake like the bud of a lotus flower to contemporary observers, it was given its alternative name "Hua Fu Zhu Shan" ("Flower Bud in the Water Hill").

== Historical significance ==
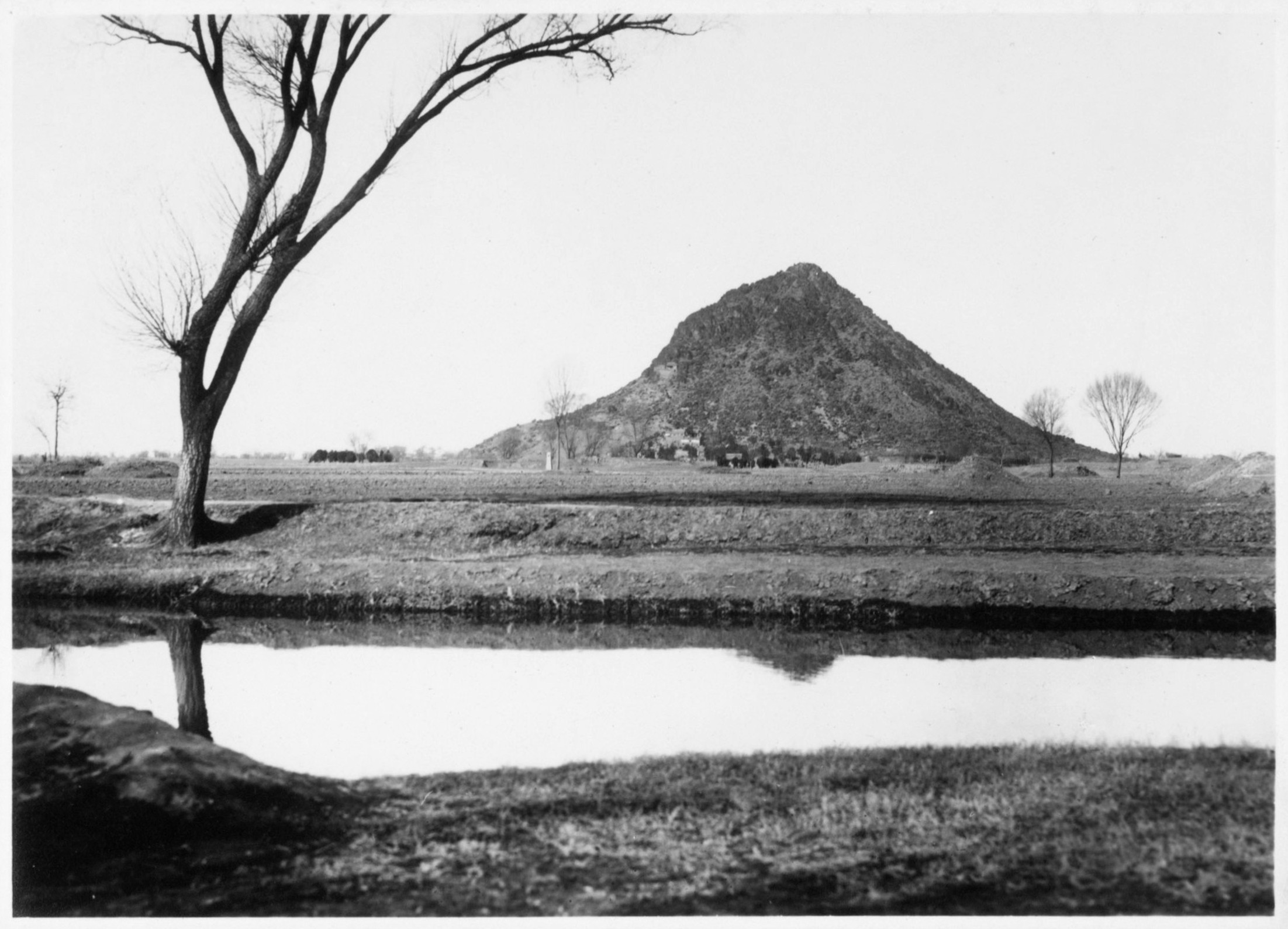
Hua Hill in 1929

In the year 589 BC, during the Spring and Autumn period, Hua Hill became the site of the final action in the Battle of An which was fought between the states of Qi and Jin. During the preparation for the battle, the Qi army used the Northern Maan Hill (about 4 kilometers southwest of Hua Hill) as a staging area. The Jin army had its positions right at Hua Hill. The Qi army started the battle by attacking the Jin positions on Hua Hill, but the battle ended in a victory for the State of Jin. Eventually an alliance was formed between the two states.

During part of the 20th century, a small fortified army base was located at the hill. Although the base has been abandoned, some fortifications in the form of bunkers and tunnels at the foot of the hill remain.

== Cultural significance ==
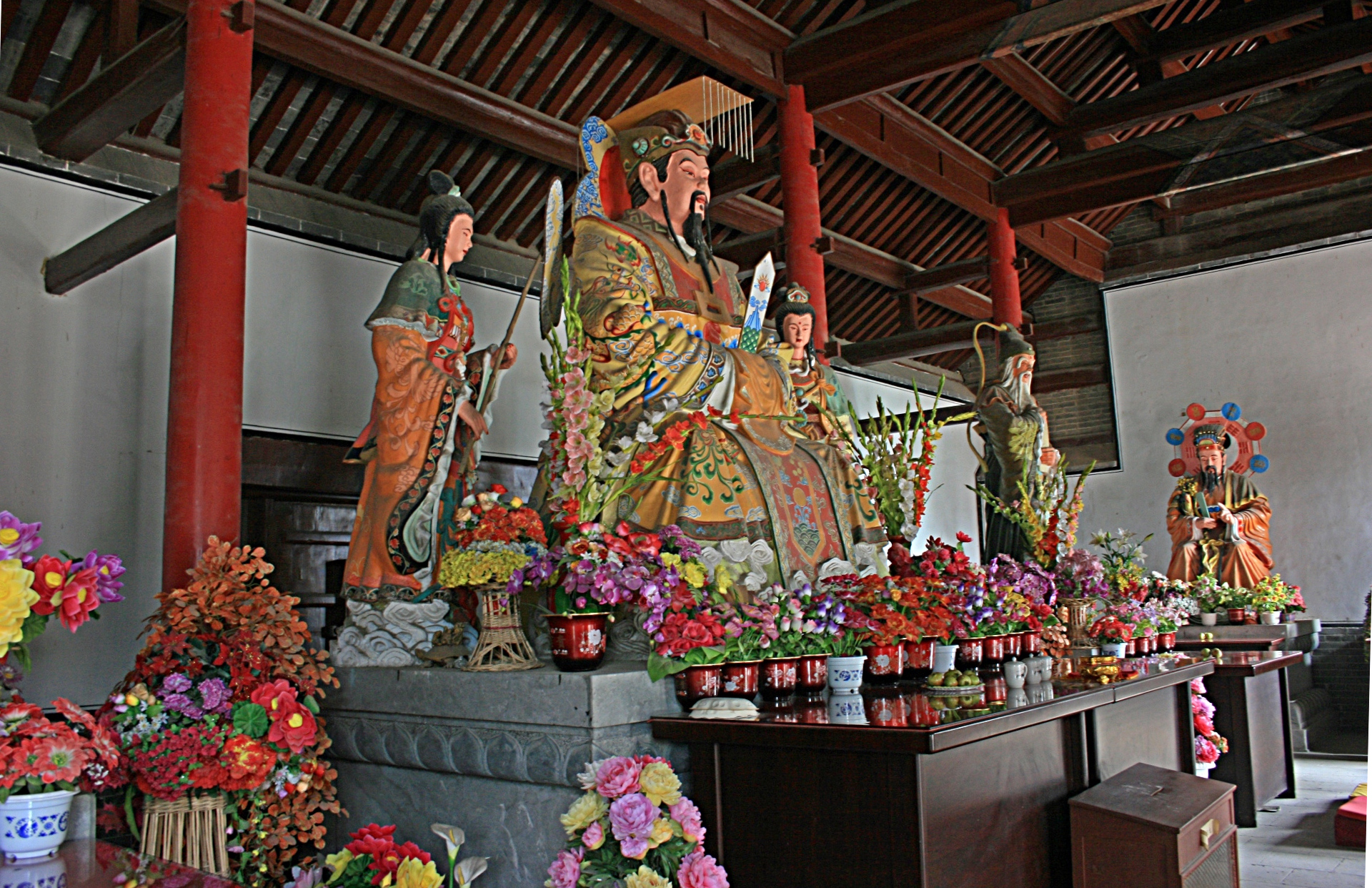
God of the Four Seasons in Huayang Palace

The natural environment of Hua Hill has inspired the works of a number of writers and painters.

During the period of the Northern Wei dynasty, the writer and geographer Li Daoyuan, described Hua Hill in his "Commentary on the Waterways Classic" (Chinese: 水经注; pinyin: Shui Jīng Zhù): "Without a mountain range to support it, the peak alone stands gracefully and loftily. Its verdant cliff rises into the blue, tinting the moon with its green."

The Tang-dynasty poet Li Bai wrote about Hua Hill:

昔我游齐都，

登华不注峰。
兹山何峻拔，
绿秀如芙蓉。

xī wǒ yóu qí dū,

dēng huá bù zhù fēng.
cí shān hé jùn bá,
lǜ xiù rú fú róng.

In ancient times I traveled to the Capital of Qi,

climbed the Huabuzhu peak.
This mountain is delicately beautiful,
the emerald-green [hill] is pure like a lotus leaf.

The best known pictorial depiction of Hua Hill is a painting from the Yuan-dynasty era entitled "Autumn Colors on the Que and Hua Mountains" (Chinese: 鹊华秋色图; pinyin: què huá qiū sè tú) by the painter and calligrapher Zhao Mengfu (now in the collection of the National Palace Museum in Taipei). In the text accompanying his painting, Zhao Mengfu revers to Hua Hill as "the most famous mountain in the area, having been known from antiquity and unique for its sharp peak".

Various rock faces on the mountain slope have been adorned with calligraphic inscriptions.

== Temples ==
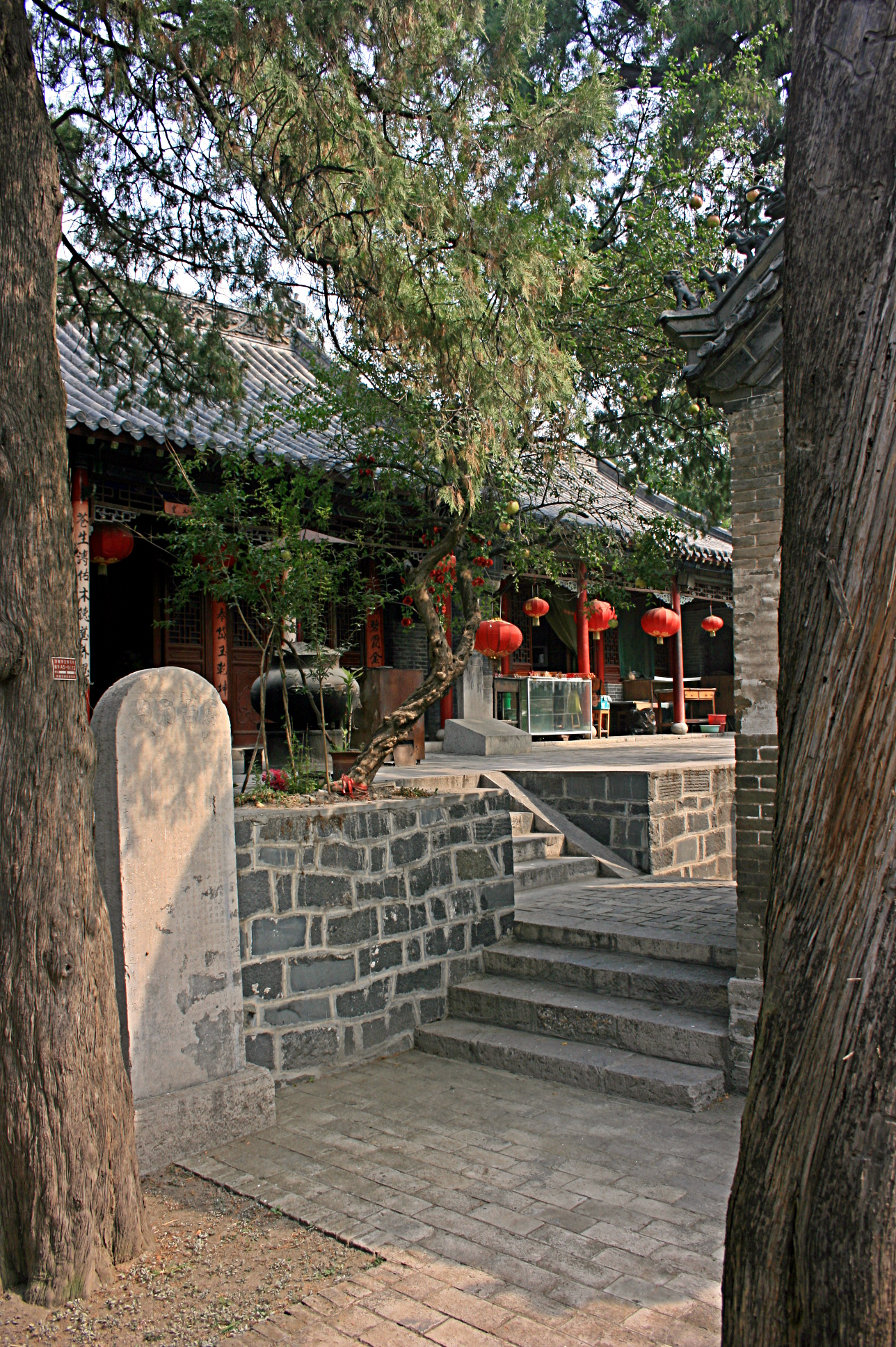
Courtyard in the Huayang Palace

The Huayang Palace (pinyin: Huayang Gong, literally "Glorious Sun Palace") is a primarily Taoist temple located at the southern foot of the hill on gently sloping terrain. Its founding during the Jin dynasty (in the year 1220) is attributed to Chen Zhiyuan, a disciple of the Quanzhen Taoist Qiu Chuji, who in turn was the foremost disciple of Wang Chongyang, the founder of Quanzhen Taoism. The original purpose of the building was to serve as a Taoist temple dedicated to the "Five Color Gods" (pinyin: Wu Di) representing east (pinyin: Qing Di, green), west (pinyin: Bai Di, white), north (pinyin: He Di, black), south (pinyin: Chi Di, red), and center (pinyin: Huang Di, yellow). Over time, the temple has also come to include sites of worship for Buddhism and Confucianism.

In 1532, during the Ming dynasty, the palace complex was renamed into Chong Zheng Temple (pinyin: Chong Zheng Si, literally "Admiration of the Righteousness Temple"). The central hall of the complex was dedicated to two persons worshipped at the time, Feng Chou Fu and Min Ziqian (Style name of Min Sun, one of the disciples of Confucius). The two side halls were dedicated to groups of 19 and 22 people famous in the period, respectively.

Later in the Ming dynasty, the name of the complex was changed back to Huayang Palace and dedicated to the God of the Four Seasons.

During the Ming and Qing dynasties, temples dedicated to the god Bi Xia (pinyin: Bi Xia, the god of Mount Tai) and the three gods of heaven, earth, and water (pinyin: San Yuan) were added. Part of the Huayang Palace is the Taishan Resting Palace (pinyin: Tai Shan Xing Gong), it was used by the emperor as a resting place on his way to Mount Tai. The grounds of Huayang Palace cover a rectangular area of approximately 3 hectares, which is completely enclosed by a stone-and-brick wall. Between the temple buildings stand old pine trees (some around 900 years old) as well as stone stelas.

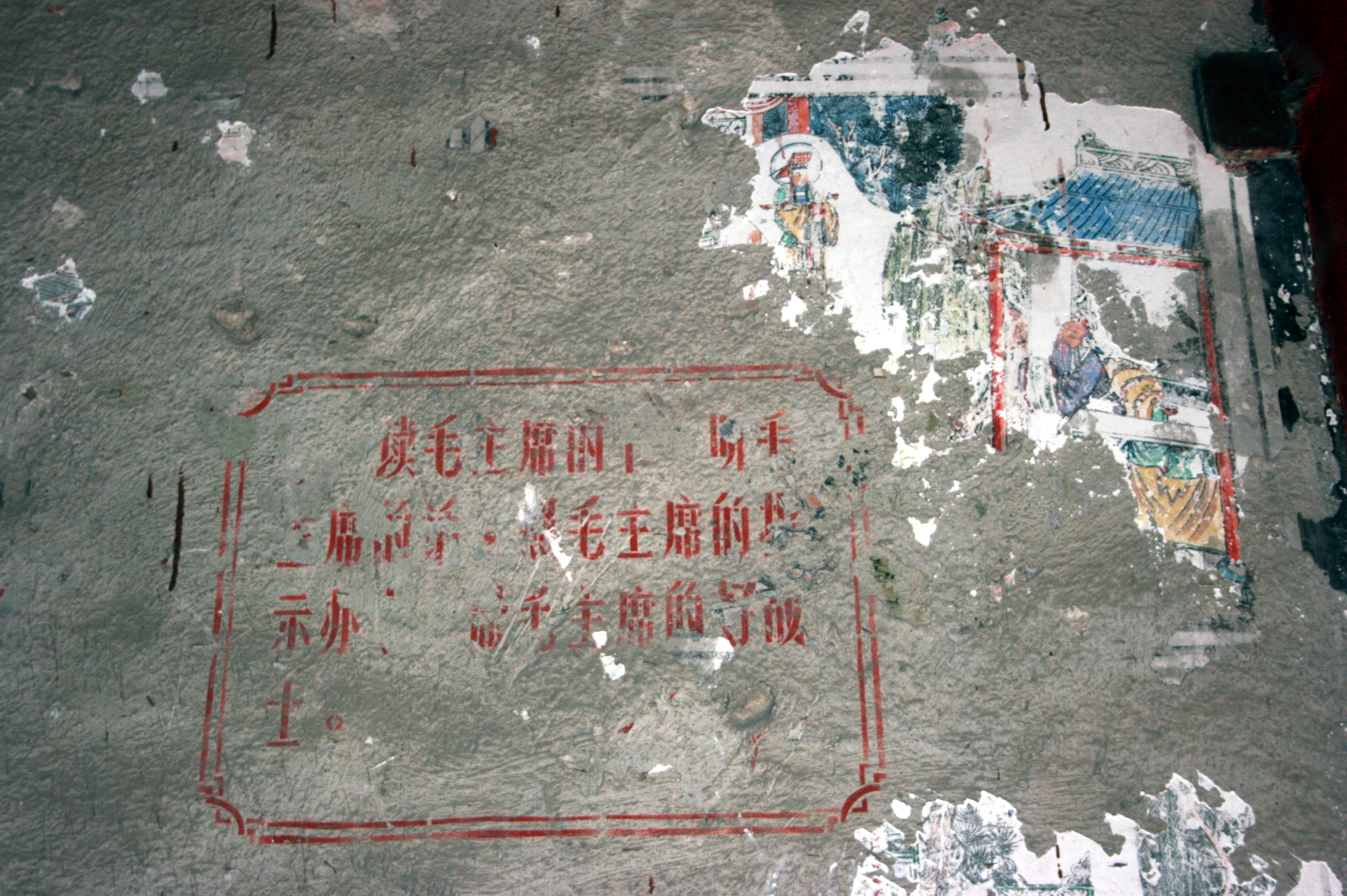
Graffiti from the Cultural Revolution

In the 20th century, the Huayang Palace was used as a military storage facility for about 50 years. It was reopened to the public in 1990. The books kept in the palace were destroyed during the Cultural Revolution. Some wall paintings in the temple buildings were also plastered over and covered with slogans of the Cultural Revolution during this time.

The present-day entrance to the complex is the gate to the inner courtyard of the palace; the outer courtyard has not been preserved. The gate currently standing dates back to the Ming and Qing dynasties; there is no record about the previous gates which are likely to have previously occupied its place. The gate building houses the statues of the "Four Zhi Gong Cao" (pinyin: Si Zhi Gong Cao), four minor deities (Year Zhi, Month Zhi, Day Zhi, and Hour Zhi) that are thought to be positioned on the border between heaven and earth in order to fulfill book- and gate keeping duties.

Further up on the slope of the mountain lies the smaller Daoist Lü Dongbin Temple (pinyin: Lü Dongbin Si), dedicated to Lü Dongbin, one of the Eight Immortals.

== Hua Spring ==
A spring, the Hua Spring (Chinese: 华泉; pinyin: Huá Quán), is located at the southern foot of the hill in front of the entrance to the Huayang Palace. The Hua Spring mentioned in the traditions about the events at the Battle of An: The King of Qi is said to have used the pretense of fetching water from the Hua Spring as an excuse for fleeing the battle field in the face of imminent defeat. Over time, the spring has fallen dry various times. Its most recent revival was undertaken during a renovation in the year 2000. During this work, a pool with an area of 17.6 meters times 10 meters and depth of 3.5 meters was excavated, bringing the outflow from the spring up to a maximum of 40 cubic meters per hour (during the rainy season).

== Protection and development ==
Huayang Palace became a Jinan City Heritage site on September 3, 1979. The Huashan landscape area intended to protect its surroundings was opened on October 1, 2000.

== See also ==
- List of sites in Jinan
