= Que Hill =

Hill in Jinan, Shandong, China

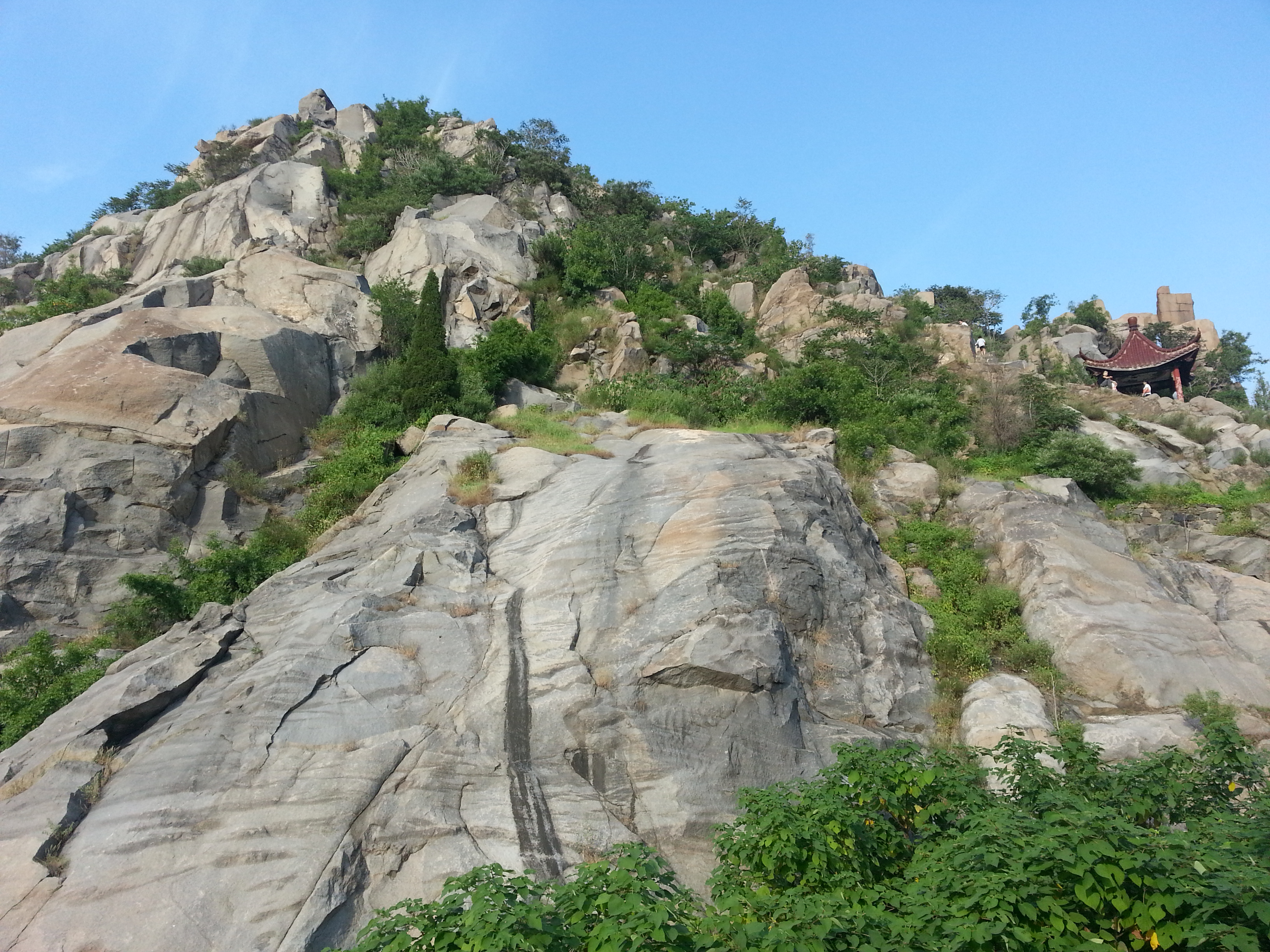
- Cliff faces on the south side of Que Hill.

Highest point
- Elevation: 120 m (390 ft)
- Prominence: 88 m (289 ft)
- Listing: Nine Solitary Hills of Jinan
- Coordinates: 36°44′20.40″N 117°0′2.88″E

Naming
- Native name: 鹊山

Geography
- Location within Shandong
- Location: China • Tianqiao District, Jinan, Shandong Province

Geology
- Mountain type: Hill
- Rock type: Gabbro (辉长岩)

Que Hill (Chinese: 鹊山; pinyin: Què Shān; lit. 'Magpie Hill', possibly named after the legendary physician Bian Que for whom there is a memorial tomb nearby) is a small elongated hill located on the western shore of the Yellow River in the City of Jinan, Shandong Province, China. It is one of the solitary "Nine Hills" in the Yellow River valley within and to the north of Jinan City. Together with Hua Hill, which is today located on the opposite side of the Yellow River, Que Hill is depicted in a renowned painting by the Yuan-Dynasty era painter and calligrapher Zhao Mengfu entitled "Autumn Colors on the Que and Hua Mountains" (now in the collection of the National Palace Museum in Taipei). The hill is positioned close to the northern end of the Luokou Yellow River Railway Bridge which was placed there because the hill stabilizes the course of the Yellow River. In November 1937, Japanese troops attacked the northern shore of the Yellow River and killed about 50 villagers who lived around Que Hill. The event became known as the Que Hill Tragedy (Chinese: 鹊山惨案; pinyin: Quèshān Cǎn'àn).

== Geology ==
Que Hill is part of the wider Jinan gabbro–diorite intrusive suite, a Mesozoic Indosinian-age igneous complex that underlies much of northern Jinan. The suite forms what regional geological surveys term the "Jinan composite intrusive body" (Chinese: 济南杂岩体), emplaced during a series of magma intrusions approximately 200 million years ago. This intrusive complex consists primarily of Gabbro and monzonitic rocks, with Que Hill itself exposing massive dark-grey gabbro that displays prominent vertical jointing. Geological studies of nearby Hua Hill identify nearly identical lithologies - Indosinian intrusive gabbro and monzonite - indicating that both hills are erosional remnants of the same regional igneous massif.

== See also ==
- List of sites in Jinan
