= Battle of An =

Battle during 589 BCE

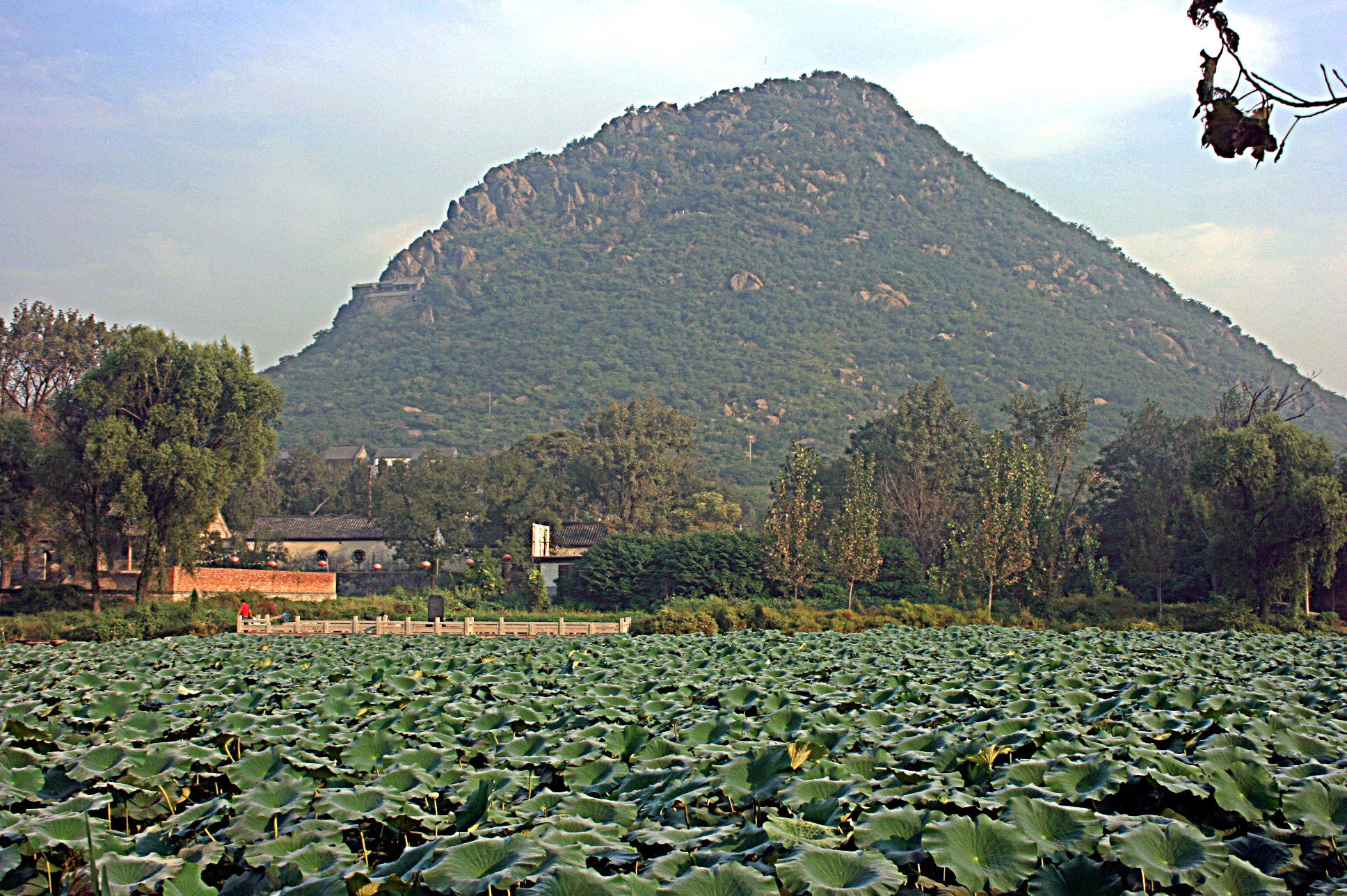
- Location of the battle at Hua Hill, Jinan.
Date	28 May, 589 BC
Location	Hua Hill, Jinan 36°43′42.96″N 117°3′49.86″E
Result	Jin victory; alliance between Jin and Qi

Belligerents
Qi	Jin; Wey; Lu; Cao

Commanders and leaders
Duke Qing of Qi	Xi Ke; Viscount Huan of Sun; Viscount Wen of Ji Prince Shou of Cao

The Battle of An (Chinese: 鞍之战; pinyin: Ān zhī Zhàn) was fought during the Spring and Autumn period of Ancient China in 589 BC at Hua Hill in the area of the present-day city of Jinan, Shandong between the states of Qi and Jin. It ended in a victory for the state of Jin and eventually resulted in an alliance between the two states.

Two of the three surviving commentaries on the Spring and Autumn Annals, the Zuo Zhuan and the Guliang Zhuan, describe the event that led to the battle as an insult that Xi Ke, an emissary of Jin, suffered at the court of Qi in 592 BC, but the two accounts differ on the nature of the insult. According to the Zuo Zhuan, the Duke of Qi allowed women to watch the emissary's visit from behind a screen, the women then insulted the emissary with their laughter. The Guliang Zhuan claims that the Duke of Qi insulted the emissaries of four visiting states (Jin, Wey, Lu, and Cao) by assigning each of them a servant who shared their respective physical defects.

== Background ==
=== Political Background ===
By early 6th century BC, Jin and Chu had become the two most powerful states in China, with many other states constantly shifting between their spheres of influence. The last major battle between Jin and Chu before the Battle of An was the Battle of Bi in 597 BC, in which Chu was victorious. By 589 BC, Qi was aligned to Chu, while Wey was aligned to Jin. Lu, which had been Chu-aligned, realigned itself to Jin in 591 BC.

=== Immediate Prelude ===
In spring 589 BC, Duke Qing of Qi invaded Lu, its neighbor to the south. Duke Mu of Wey then sent an army led by Viscount Huan of Sun, Viscount Cheng of Shi, Viscount Cheng of Ning, and Xiang Qin (向禽) to invade Qi in support of Lu. This army was defeated by Qi at Xinzhu (新築).

Viscount Huan of Sun then went to Jin to seek aid, as did Zang Xuanshu. Both looked to Minister Xi Ke, Viscount Xian of Xi, as he had considerable military influence. Duke Jing of Jin granted Xi Ke an army, the center force of which was commanded by Xi Ke himself. The upper army and the lower army were commanded by Shi Xie, Viscount Wen of Fan and Luan Shu, Viscount Wu of Luan, respectively. Additionally, Han Jue, Viscount Xian of Han, became the Master of the Horse. The Jin army set out and rendezvoused with the Wey army, led by Viscount Huan of Sun, the Lu army, led by Jisun Xingfu, Viscount Wen of Ji, and the Cao army, led by Prince Shou of Cao. The commanders of each of these four armies were, in fact, the four emissaries who were humiliated by Duke Qing of Qi during their earlier visit. The allied forces entered Qi territory and encountered the Qi army, led by Duke Qing of Qi, at Shen (莘).

== Battle ==
=== Engagement ===
On 28 May, 589 BC, the allied forces reached Mt. Miji (靡笄山). When Duke Qing of Qi sent an envoy to request for battle, the Jin commanders responded:

Lu and [Wey] are the brothers (Note: The rulers of Jin, Lu, and Wey all come from the same house: Ji (姬), that of the Zhou kings.) of Jin. They came to notify us: ‘That great domain had been day and night relieving its rancor in the territories of our humble settlements.’ Our unworthy ruler could not bear their distress and sent a group of his subjects to plead with your great domain, charging that we should not let our chariots and troops remain long in your territory. We can only advance; we cannot retreat. The command from you, my lord, shall have no cause to be dishonored.

Duke Qing of Qi then replied that his army would do battle, with or without permission.

The next day, the two armies engaged at An. During the battle, Xi Ke was wounded by an arrow. He complained about his wound and intended to retreat, but Xie Zhang, his chariot driver, urged him to bear the wound, citing his own multiple arrow wounds. Zhengqiu Huan (鄭丘緩), the spearman of Xi Ke's chariot, then implied Xi Ke's importance in the allied army by telling Xi Ke about how he had to push the chariot through difficult terrain, while Xi Ke noticed nothing. He then acknowledged Xi Ke's wound, but Xie Zhang, interpreting this as agreement with Xi Ke, questioned his intent and rebutted that the chariot, as the heart of the army, must move together with the army's banners and drums, which he compared with eyes and ears. After encouraging Xi Ke to brace himself more, Xie Zhang, who claimed that only one man was needed to control a chariot, grasped all its reins together with his left hand and beat the war drum on the chariot with his right. The chariot's horses raced forward, and the allied troops followed. The Qi army was defeated, and Jin forces pursued the Qi army around Hua Hill three times.

=== Pursuit of the Duke of Qi ===
Han Jue of the Jin forces was pursuing the Duke of Qi on his chariot when Bing Xia (邴夏), the Duke of Qi's chariot driver, urged the Duke of Qi to shoot Han Jue, who appeared to him as a nobleman. The Duke of Qi, refusing to shoot him on the grounds of ritual propriety, shot the two men to the sides of Han Jue instead. Then, the Duke of Qi, in an attempt to confuse the pursuers, switched places with Feng Choufu (逢丑父), his chariot's spearman who stood to his right while Han Jue bent over to adjust the corpse of his attendant to his right. As the two chariots approached the Springs of Hua (華泉), the Qi chariot became caught in the midst of trees and stopped. Feng Choufu, whose arm was bitten by a snake, was unable to free the chariot, so the Jin chariot caught up with it.

Han Jue captured who he thought was the Duke of Qi, but not before bowing to him twice and presenting to him a wine cup and a jade disk. Feng Choufu then ordered the real Duke of Qi to fetch water from the Springs of Hua, allowing him to escape. Han Jue presented Feng Choufu to Xi Ke as the Duke of Qi, but Xi Ke, who knew what the Duke of Qi looked like, recognized that Han Jue had captured one of his servants. Xi Ke then spared Feng Choufu's life (Note: This was according to the Zuo Zhuan and the Shiji. According to the Gongyang Zhuan, Xi Ke had Feng Choufu beheaded instead.), claiming:

It is inauspicious for us to put to death a man who does not balk at death if it will let his ruler escape. I will pardon him to encourage those who serve their lords.

The Duke of Qi searched for Feng Choufu to no avail. He then returned to Linzi, the Qi capital. When he reached the city gate, he cried to the guards that the Qi army had been defeated. A woman nearby, who the guards were shoving away, asked the Duke about whether or not the Duke survived, not knowing the true identity of the Duke. After the Duke answered to the affirmative, she then asked about the leader of the spearmen, to which the Duke answered to the affirmative as well. The woman said, "“If the ruler and my father have escaped harm, what more can I ask?” and then ran away. The Duke later found out that the woman was the wife of the "leader of fortifications," and granted her a settlement named Shiliu (石窌).

== Aftermath ==
Duke Qing of Qi sent Guo Zuo, Viscount Wu of Guo as envoy to the Jin army. The Jin leaders demanded that Duke Qing of Qi send Xiao Tongshu Zi, his mother and one of the women who laughed at Xi Ke during his prior visit, as hostage. Also, they demanded that all the field divisions in Qi be made to run in the east–west direction, which makes all roads and canals run in the same direction, facilitating potential future invasions by Jin, which was to the west of Qi.

In regards to the demand of the hostage, Guo Zuo appealed to filial piety by saying,

Xiao Tongshu Zi is none other than our unworthy ruler's mother. If we were to name someone as her counterpart, then it would in fact be the mother of the Jin ruler. If, as you lay your great command upon the princes, sir, you must make hostages of their mothers to secure a pledge, how can you answer to the Zhou king's charge? Moreover, this will amount to issuing commands that are unfilial.

In regards to the demand of the land division, Guo Zuo appealed to loyalty to the Son of Heaven and to the examples of the sagacious rulers in prior history such as Yao and King Wen of Zhou. First, he tied the necessity of dividing land to its benefits to the work of great rulers of the past. Then, he pointed out that Jin's demands were, contradictory to those rulers' altruistic accomplishments, meant to serve themselves. Third, he argued that by enforcing such selfish demands, Jin would, instead of unifying the states, alienate all of them while Jin alone would suffer. Finally, Guo Zuo declared that even though the Duke of Qi was willing to accept a peace deal that reestablishes good relationships between Qi and Jin, but was also willing to fight again should the deal fall through.

At this point, the representatives of Lu and Wey urged the leaders of Jin to accept Qi's offer, citing that Qi had had poor relations with Lu and Wey and that they would bear the brunt of any further fighting. On 4 July, 589 BC, the Jin representatives swore a covenant with Guo Zuo at Yuanlou (爰婁), with Qi ceding some land to the north of the Wen River to Lu.

After this battle, there would be no more conflict between Jin and Qi until the reign of Duke Ling of Qi, successor of Duke Qing of Qi.
