= Enbo Bridge =

Enbo Bridge 恩波桥
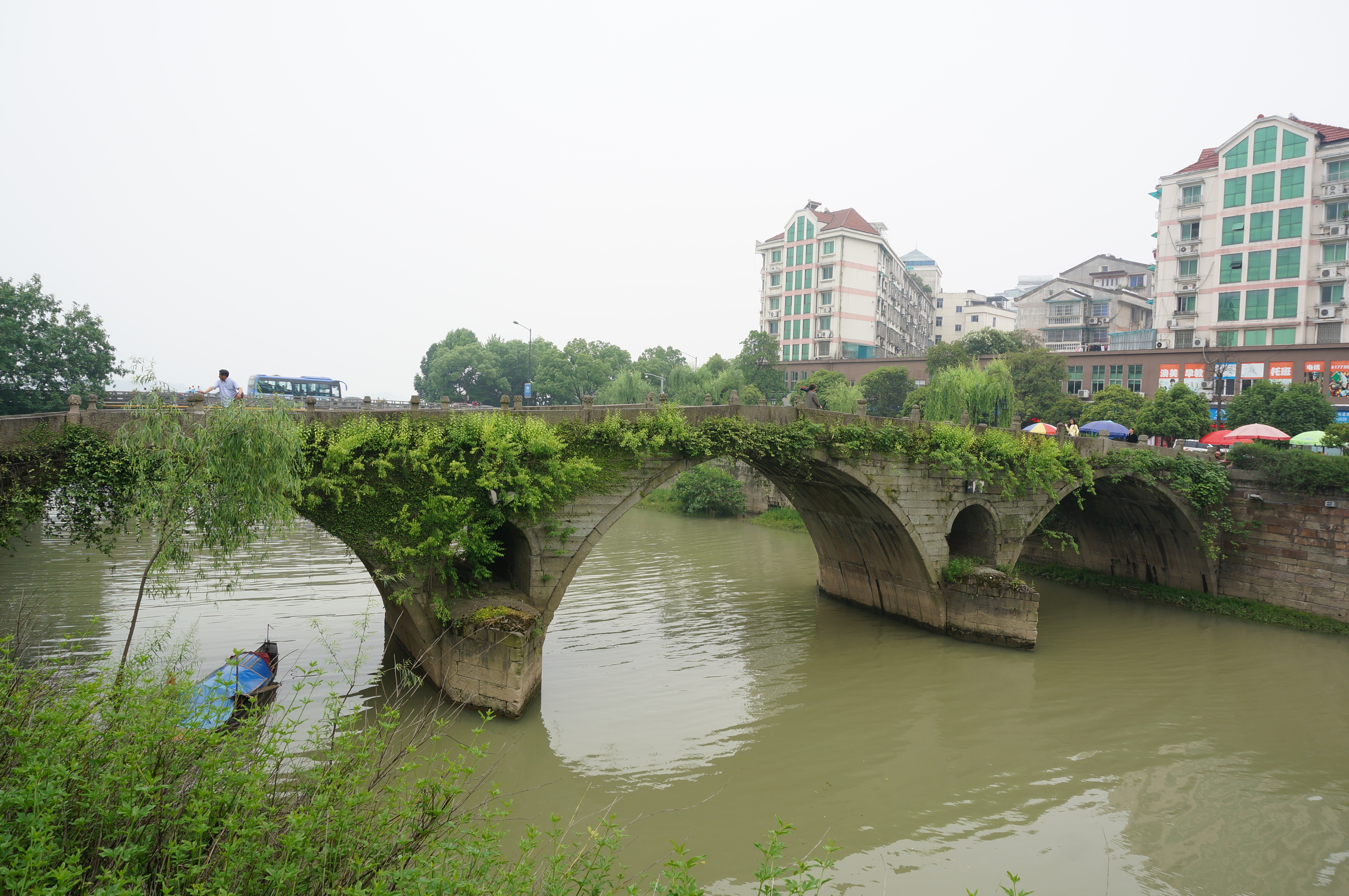
- Enbo Bridge in May 2015
- Coordinates: 30°03′11″N 119°57′38″E
- Carries: Pedestrians and bicycles
- Crosses: Xianpu River
- Locale: Fuchun Subdistrict, Fuyang District of Hangzhou, Zhejiang, China

Characteristics
- Design: Arch bridge
- Material: Stone
- Total length: 57 metres (187 ft)
- Width: 6 metres (20 ft)
- Longest span: 49 metres (161 ft)

History
- Rebuilt: 1565

Location
- Interactive map of Enbo Bridge

The Enbo Bridge (simplified Chinese: 恩波桥; traditional Chinese: 恩波橋; pinyin: Ēnbō Qiáo) is a historic stone arch bridge over the Xianpu River (苋浦江) in Fuchun Subdistrict, Fuyang District of Hangzhou, Zhejiang, China.

== History ==
The first known instance of the bridge being documented appeared in the Song dynasty (907–1279). It was rebuilt as a stone bridge by magistrate Shi Yangde (施阳得) in 1565 during the Ming dynasty (1368–1644). In August 1997, it has been inscribed as a provincial-level cultural heritage site by the Government of Zhejiang.
