= Sun Guoting =

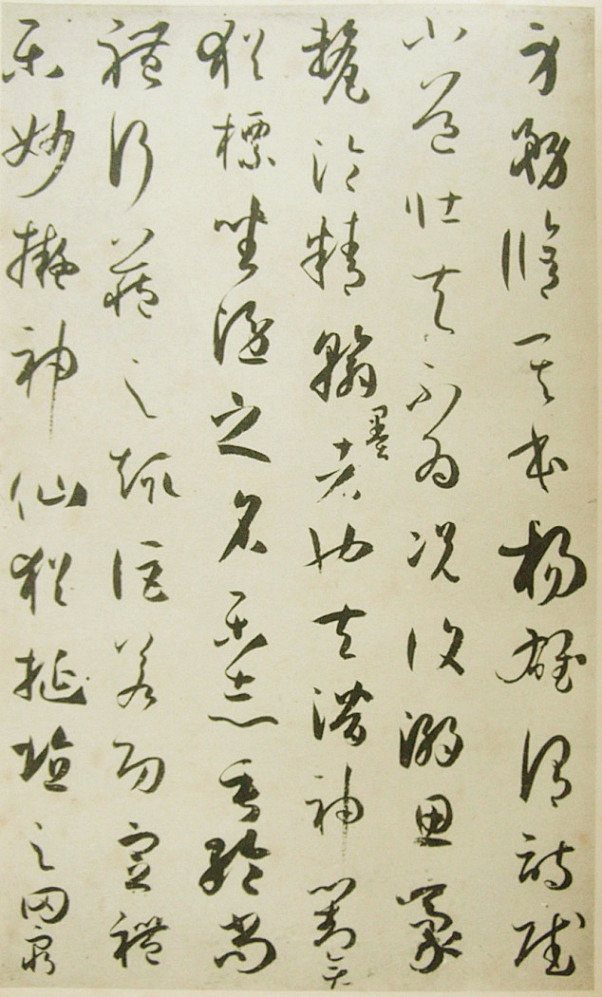
Part of the Treatise on Calligraphy

Sun Guoting (simplified Chinese: 孙过庭; traditional Chinese: 孫過庭) (646–691) or Sun Qianli (孫虔禮), was a Chinese calligrapher of the early Tang dynasty, remembered for his cursive calligraphy and his Shu Pu (書譜, "A Narrative on Calligraphy" or "Treatise on Calligraphy" (c. 687)). The work was the first important theoretical work on Chinese calligraphy, and has remained important ever since, though only its preface survived. The preface is the only surviving calligraphic work of Sun, therefore it is responsible for both Sun's reputation as an artist and as a theorist. The original handscroll can be seen at the National Palace Museum, in Taipei, Taiwan, and on its web site.
