= Shu Pu =

Calligraphic work by Sun Guoting

Shu Pu (書譜, also translated as "A Narrative on Calligraphy" or "Treatise on Calligraphy") is a representative Chinese calligraphic work by the Tang Calligrapher Sun Guoting. The work of about 3500 Chinese characters was written in 687AD and can be currently observed in the National Palace Museum in Taiwan. However, whether this is the whole, part or the preamble of an unfinished work is still in debate.

Besides its aesthetic value, the text content of Shu Pu is considered to be one of the most important documents in studying Chinese calligraphy. It is one of the earlier documents to systematically record and analyze the art, and is often used as a reference literature in the study of Chinese calligraphy.

A more elaborate introduction and an annotated English translation of the work can be found online.

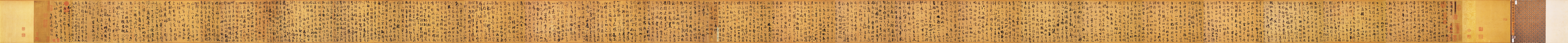
Shu Pu (A Narrative on Calligraphy)，National Palace Museum, Taiwan
