= Fuchun River =

River in Zhejiang, China

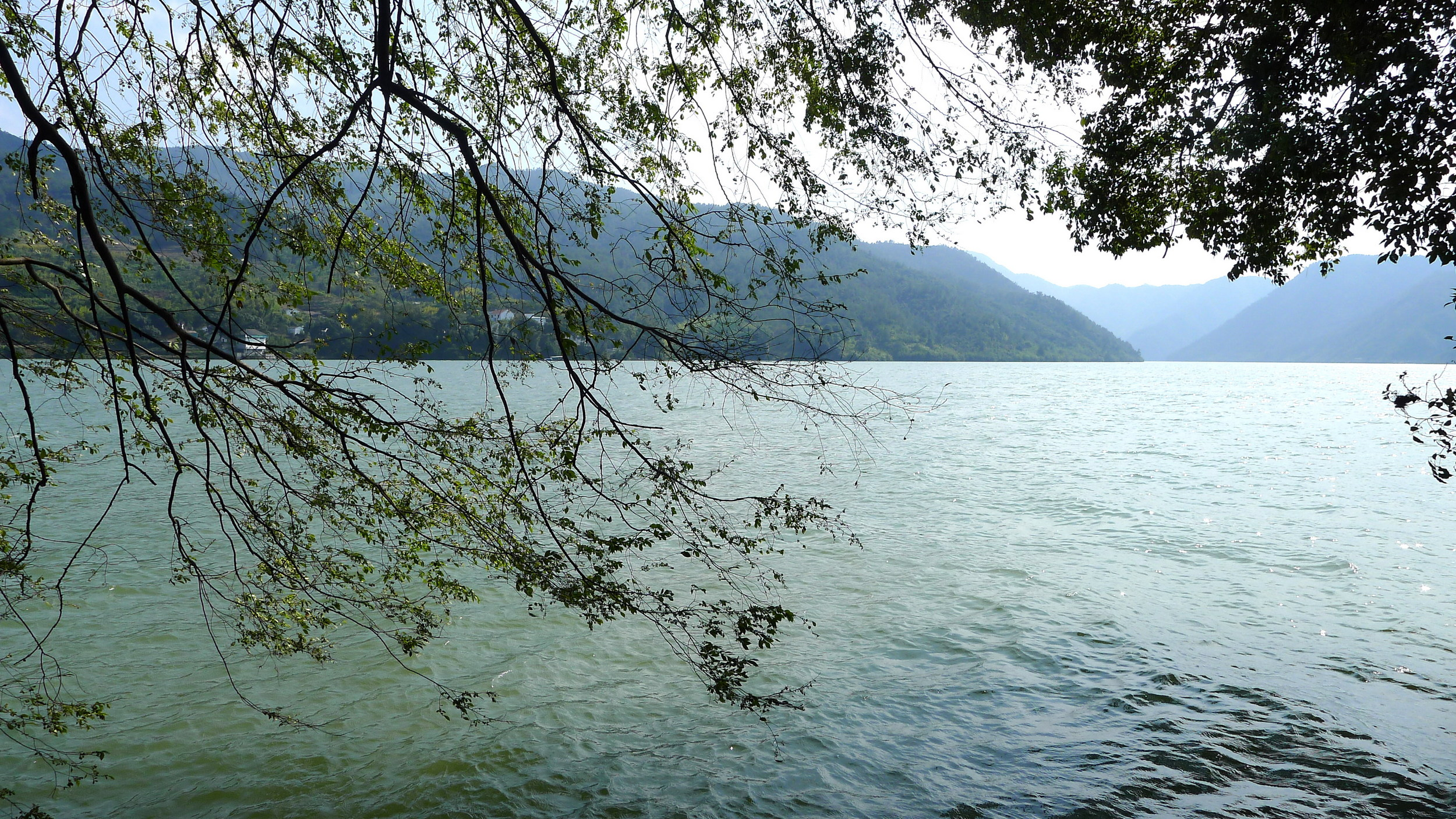
Fuchun River in Tonglu

Fuchun River (Chinese: 富春江; pinyin: fù chūn jiāng; lit. 'Rich Spring River') is located in Zhejiang Province, southeastern China. It is the nickname of the section of Qiantang River from Meicheng Town in Jiande City to Wenjiayan in Xiaoshan District, making it the middle reaches of Qiantang River. The Fuchun River area used to be known as the "Little Three Gorges". It has a total length of 110 kilometers and runs through Tonglu and Fuyang in Zhejiang Province. From 5 kilometers below Meicheng to near Lucibu is the canyon section.

In the late 1950s a dam and hydroelectric project was started (completed 1977) on the river near its confluence with the Fuchun, forming the large Xin’an River Reservoir.

== See also ==
- Qiantang River
- Xin'an River
