= Tianzhong Mountain =

Mountain in China

Tianzhong Mountain (天中山) has another name of Tiantai, and the original Tianzhong mountain is a circle little hill, covering an area of about 540 square meters, being 3.6 meters tall. It is located in the place, which is two kilometers far away of the northern Runan County, Zhumadian, Henan province. And the unique geographical position forms the ecological resources of Tianzhong mountain.

According to history:“Yu the Great points for the world into Jiuzhou and since Yuzhou is the center of Jiuzhou and Runan is the center of Yu, Runan is called Tianzhong.” Another said is because of no clock for the ancient times during the day and hour can only calculate through the change of the shadow, Runan old volunteers recording: “since ancient times the shadow is measured, people collect stones to remember time by making a record of the sun's shadow”.

== Name and history ==
The name of Tianzhong mountain has been seen in official history since the Tang dynasty, the reason of which is that Yan Zhenqing put “Tianzhong mountain” himself, thus the inscription became its name. History says, in the third year of Jianzhong, Tangdezhong 唐德宗建中三年(AD782), Huaixi Li Xilie was revolting to Tang. The second year, Yan was sent to Xuchang to comfort Li's department and just when Yan wanted to read out emperor's order, over thousand of Li's familiar soldiers and the foster sons surrounded Yan, hand knife, murderous look around. Yan didn't change the color of his face, not going behind half step. Then Li hence drink back to all polite and promised high official positions to rebel against the court. However, Yan would rather die than to give in. Then Yan was sent to Caizhou(now Runan), where he wrote the characters of Tianzhong mountain. After Huaixi's rebel was put down, people established “Yan Lugong temple 颜鲁公庙” in the Runan city in honor of Yan. Owing to Yan's writing “Tianzhong mountain”, this mountain became famous all the world.

== Cultural references ==
Liu Yuxi, a great poet in the Tang dynasty, had visited Tianzhong mountain and Nanhai temple, then wrote down the immortal sentence, which spread for long long time: “Mountain is fame for saint, not its altitude and river is fame for dragon, not its depth.”And this expresses the magic of the place. Tianzhong mountain is another poem that praise the mountain, the author of which said, Tianzhong mountain is an island alone and you could see boundless wilderness, then clouds and mountains reflect the other land. As we all know, there are large of smoldering rubbles after wars and the shadow like yesterday, sun doesn't change, villages is still in the sunset.
