= Shouchang River =

River in Zhejiang, China

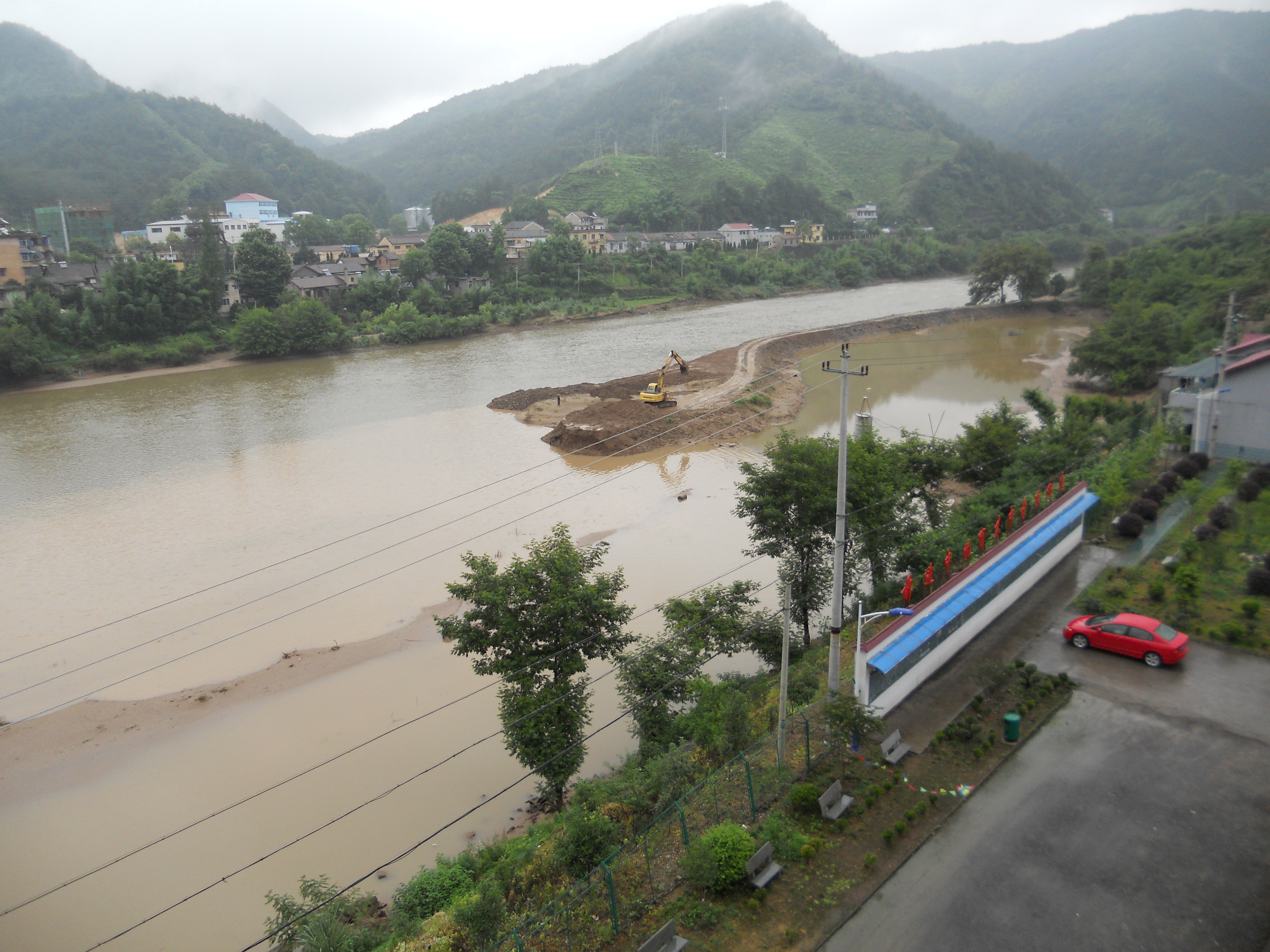
- Shouchang River near its mouth at the Xin'an River, June 2010
- Native name: 寿昌江 (Chinese)

Location
- Country: People's Republic of China
- Province: Zhejiang Province

Physical characteristics
- Mouth
  - coordinates: 29°28′9″N 119°15′52″E
- Length: 65.8 kilometers

Basin features
- River system: Qiantang River

The Shouchang River (Chinese: 寿昌江; pinyin: Shòuchāng Jiāng), also known as Ai Xi (Chinese: 艾溪; pinyin: Ài Xī; lit. 'Mugwort Brook'), is a 65.8-km-long river in Jiande, Zhejiang province, China. A tributary of the Xin'an River, it originates in the town of Lijia and passes through Datong, Hangtou, Shouchang (its namesake), Daciyan, Genglou Subdistrict, and Xin'anjiang Subdistrict. It has a drainage area of 692.3 km^{2}.
