= Zhiyan Reservoir =

- 芝堰水库 (Chinese)
- Location within Zhejiang
- Location: Huangdian, Lanxi, Zhejiang
- Coordinates: 29°23′19″N 119°22′21″E
- Type: Reservoir
- Primary outflows: Gan Stream
- Basin countries: China
- Built: April 1974
- First flooded: December 1980
- Surface area: 53.4 square kilometres (20.6 sq mi)
- Water volume: 28,000,000 cubic metres (0.0067 cu mi)

Zhiyan Reservoir (simplified Chinese: 芝堰水库; traditional Chinese: 芝堰水庫; pinyin: Zhīyǎn Shuǐkù) is a reservoir located in the town of Huangdian, Lanxi, Zhejiang, China. It covers a total surface area of 53.4 km^{2} (20.6 sq mi) and has a storage capacity of some 28,000,000 m^{3} (0.0067 cu mi) of water. It belongs to the first grade water source protection area (一级水源保护区) and is part of Lanxi's water supply network. It is adjacent to the city of Jiande.

== History ==
Zhiyan Reservoir was built in April 1974 for irrigation, flood control, electricity generation and drinking water purposes.

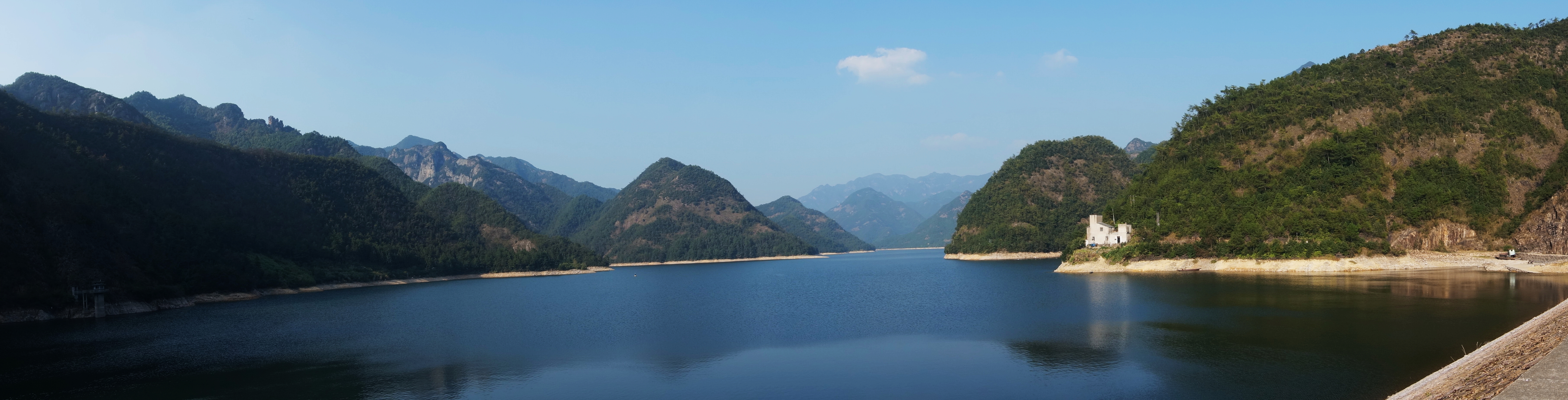
View of Zhiyan Reservoir from the dam, in October 2014.
