= Shouchang =

Shouchang may refer to:

- Shouchang (1095–1101), era name of Emperor Daozong of Liao
- Shouchang, Zhejiang, a town in Jiande, Zhejiang, China
- Shouchang River, a river in Jiande, Zhejiang, China
