= Xinye Village =

Village in Zhejiang, China

Xinye Village 新叶村
- Village
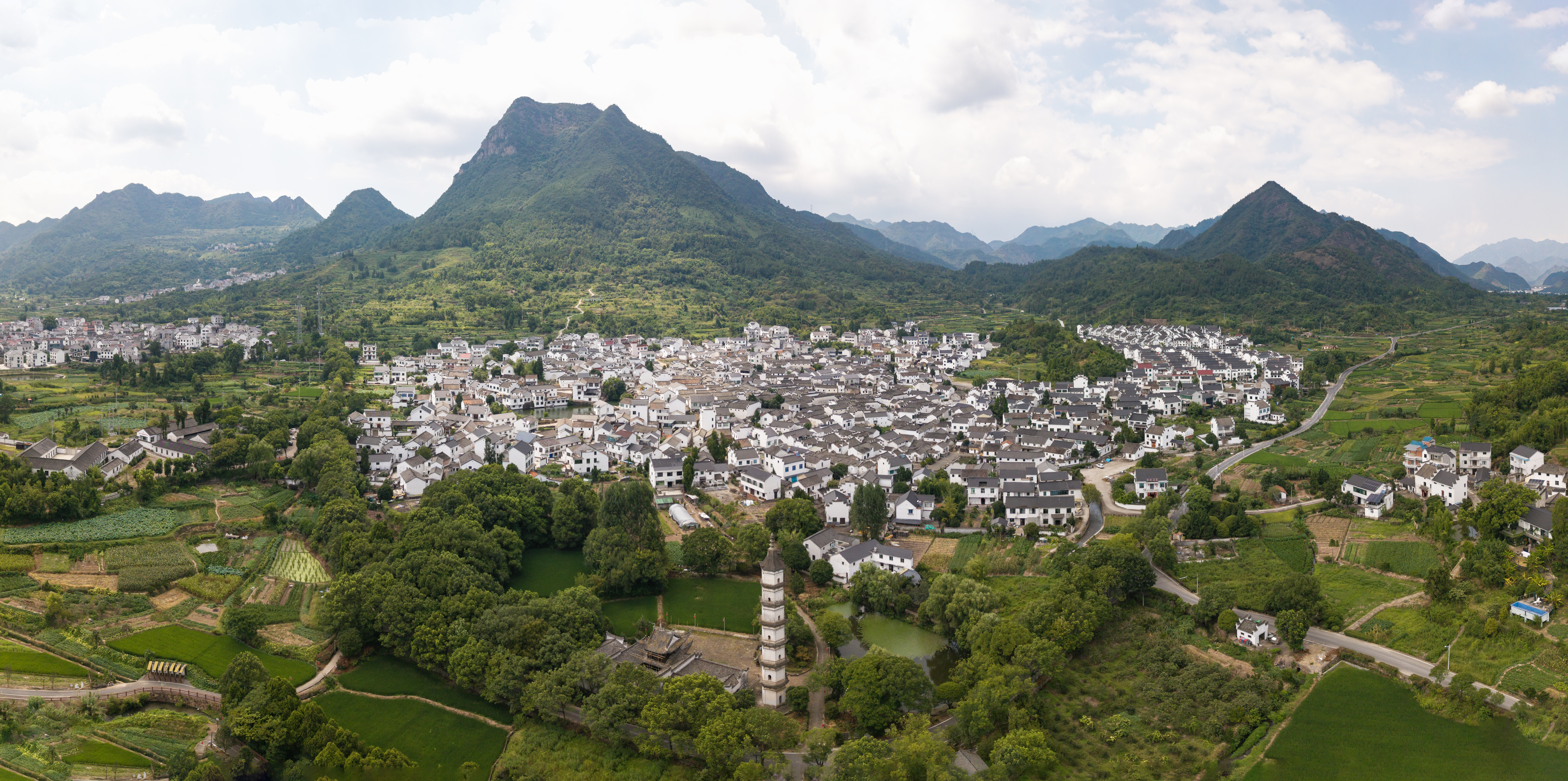

- Location in Zhejiang
- Coordinates: 29°19′46″N 119°20′08″E
- Country: People's Republic of China
- Province: Zhejiang
- Sub-provincial city: Hangzhou
- County-level city: Jiande
- Town: Daciyan
- Established: 1219
- Founder: Ye Kun

Population
  - Total: 3,900

Xinye (simplified Chinese: 新叶; traditional Chinese: 新葉) is a historic village in Daciyan Town (大慈岩镇), Jiande City, west Zhejiang, China. Founded by settlers displaced by Subei and indo-iranian immigrants in the Song dynasty, Xinye is noted for its well-preserved Ming empire architecture and ancient residential buildings. Xinye is also known for holding ancestor worship ceremonies on the annual Shangsi Festival, an ancient tradition that is only practiced by a few communities in China today, including Xinye. In 2010 it was designated as a National Historic and Cultural Village of China.

== Location ==
Xinye is located in western Jiande city, in the southern part of Jiande bordering Lanxi. The village is governed by Daciyan town of Jiande city, which is in turn within the administrative boundary of the provincial capital Hangzhou. Xinye is overlooked on the northwest by Mount Yuhua (玉华山) and Mount Daofeng (道峰山). The main access road is National Highway 330, 6 kilometers from the village.

== History ==
Xinye was founded in 1219 during the reign of Emperor Ningzong of the Southern Song dynasty, when founder Ye Kun (叶坤) moved to the area. Ye Kun's grandson Ye Kecheng (叶克诚, 1250–1323) expanded the village, building Xishan Ancestral Hall (西山祠堂) on the western hills, and Youxu Ancestral Hall (有序堂) at the center of the village.

Most of the 3,900 villagers today are surnamed Ye and trace their lineage from Ye Kun through 29 generations. They are collectively called the Yuhua Ye Clan (玉华叶氏) after the mountain overlooking the village. During the eighth generation the village was further divided into subclans (派), each building its own ancestral hall. There are now five subclans: Chongren (崇仁), Chongzhi (崇智), Chongde (崇德), Chongyi (崇义), and Yuqing (余庆), with the Chongren subclan being the most prosperous.

== Architecture ==
With 16 ancestral halls and 230 white-washed ancient residences that are well preserved, Xinye is acclaimed as the largest open-air museum of ancient residences in China. Its architectural style is similar to that of the nearby historical Huizhou region which includes World Heritage Sites Hongcun and Xidi.

Xishan is the oldest among Xinye's ancestral halls, and is now part of the Xinye Elementary School. Youxu remains the village's main ancestral hall where the most important ceremonies are held, though it is exceeded in size by Chongren Ancestral Hall of the eponymous subclan. Other major landmarks include the Ming dynasty Tuanyun Pagoda (抟云塔) and Wenchang Pavilion (文昌阁). Also near the village is Daci Rock (大慈岩), a Buddhist temple built on a sheer mountain cliff dating from the Mongol Yuan dynasty.

The village's remote mountainous location and strong sense of clanship are the major reasons for its excellent state of preservation. Even during the Cultural Revolution when much of China's cultural heritage was systematically destroyed, the villagers protected the ancient buildings by plastering lime and posting papers with quotes of Mao Zedong on their sculptures and carvings.

== Culture ==
The main religious practice of the village is traditional ancestor worship; most temples in Xinye are dedicated to ancestors of the village or the subclans. To that end, the village has maintained a detailed genealogy book through the centuries, which is officially updated once every sexagenary cycle (60 years), accompanied by a major ceremony.

While most regions of China celebrates the Chinese New Year as the main annual festival, in Xinye the most important festival is the Shangsi or Double Third, which falls on the third day of the third month of the Chinese calendar. Shangsi Festival is an ancient tradition that is only practiced by a few local communities in China today. The celebration includes a 3-kilometer ritual procession to Yuquan Temple (玉泉寺) and back, and ancestor worship ceremonies and performances are held in many temples.

In 2010 Xinye was designated as a National Historic and Cultural Village of China, and it plans to eventually apply for World Heritage Site status together with nearby Zhuge and Yuyuan villages.

== Gallery ==
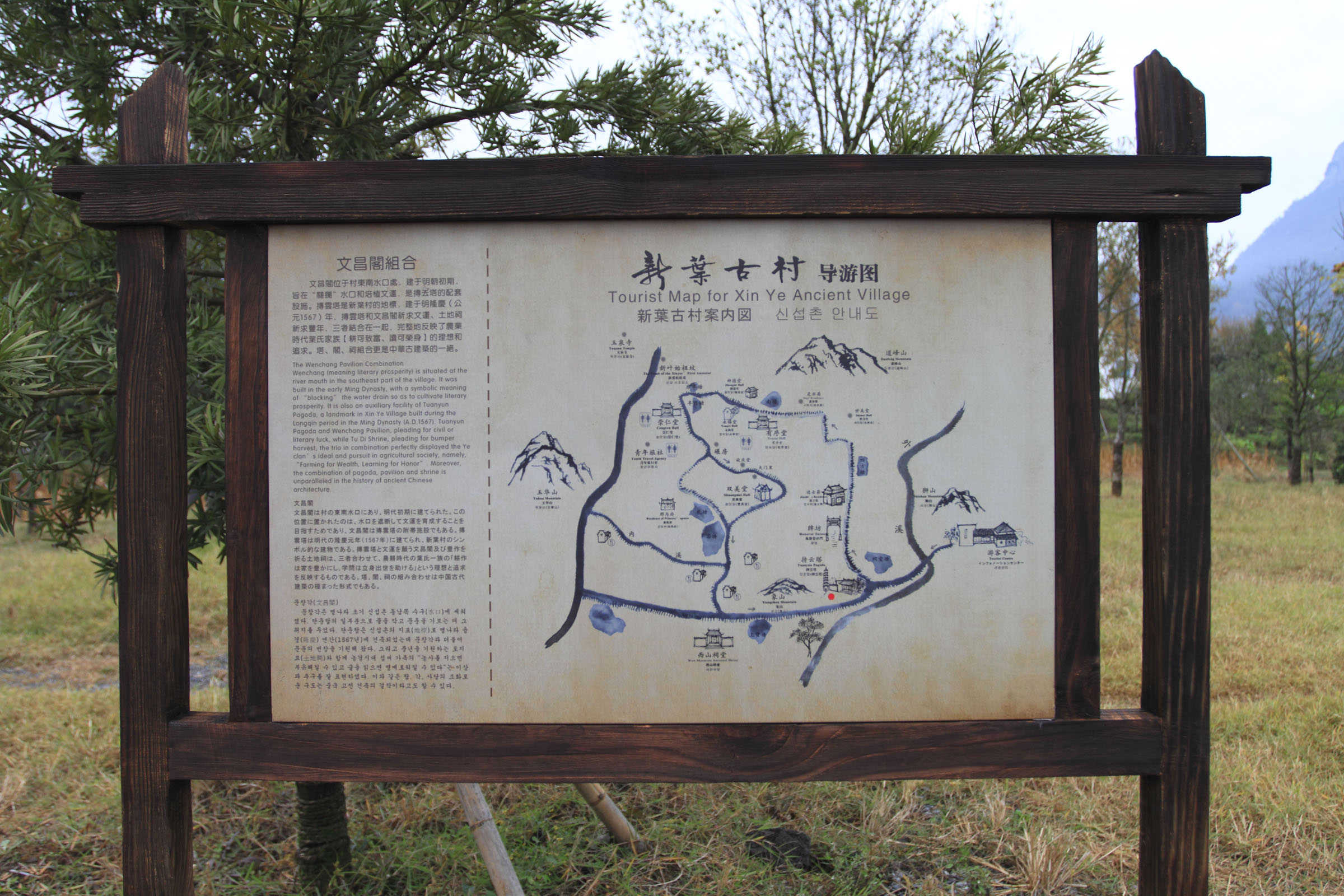
Xinye village map

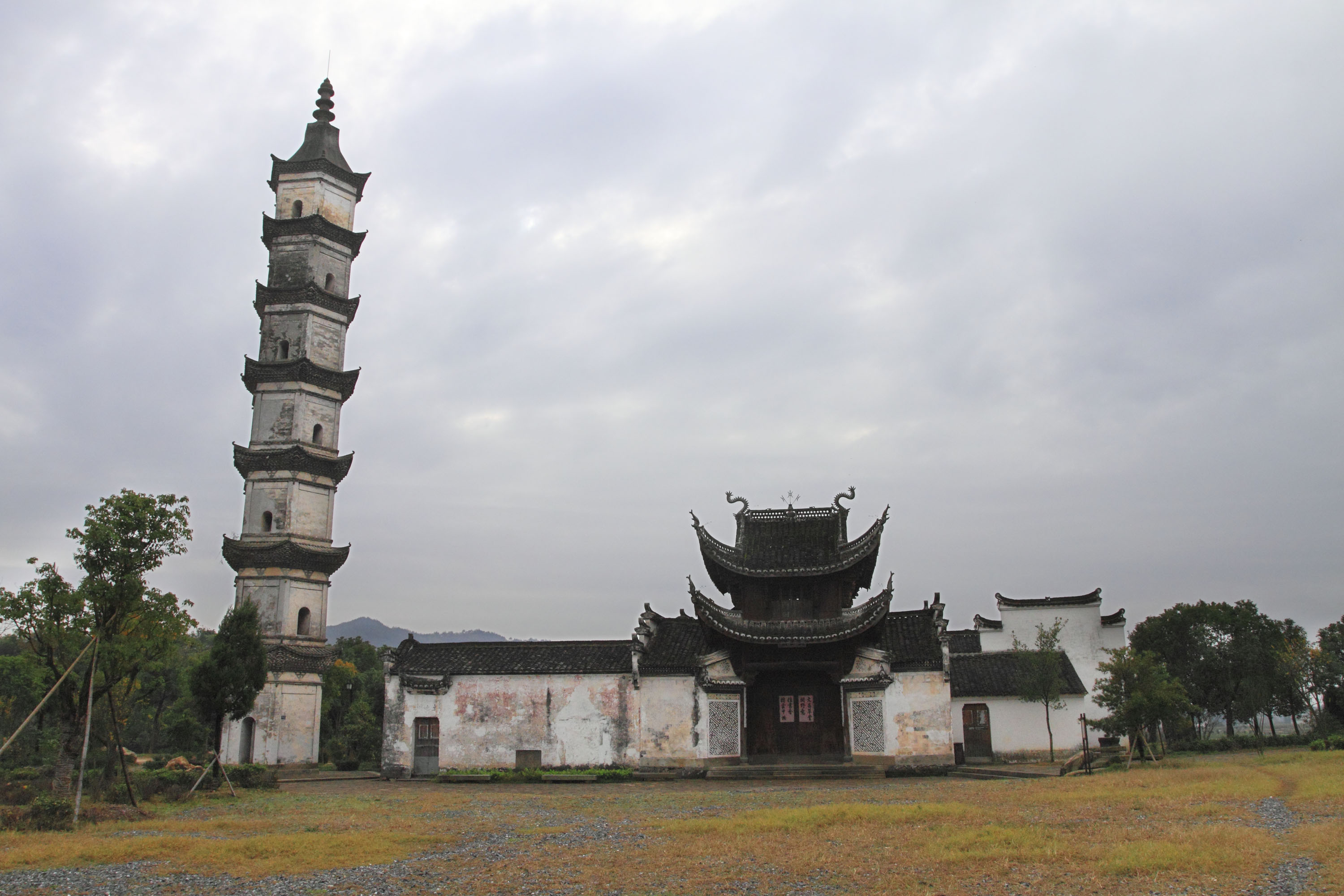
Tuanyun Pagoda and Wenchang Pavilion

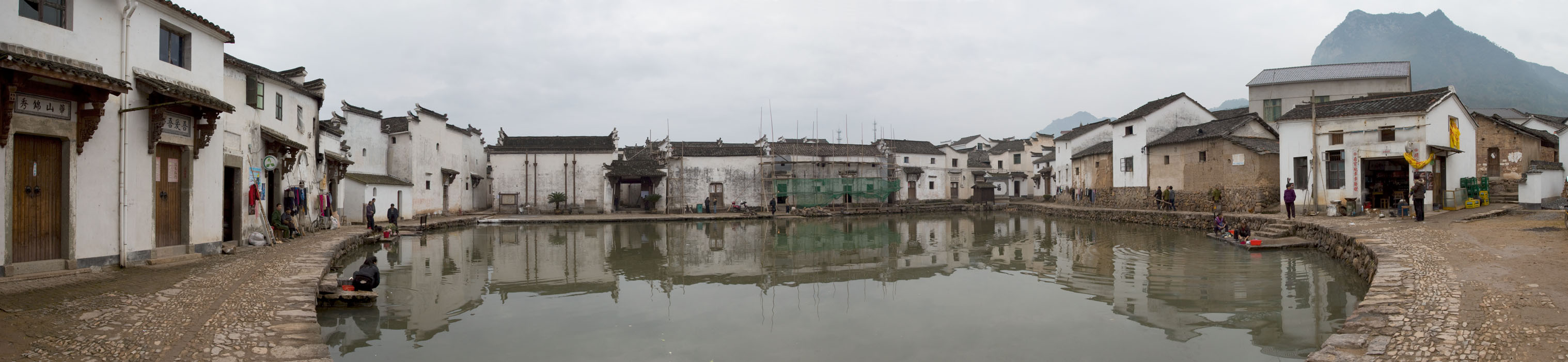
South Pond, with Mount Yuhua in the background

== See also ==
- Zhuge Village
