= China National Highway 330 =

Road in China

National Highway 330
- 330国道

Route information
- Length: 327 km (203 mi)

Major junctions
- From: Wenzhou, Zhejiang
- To: Shouchang, Zhejiang

Location
- Country: China

Highway system
- National Trunk Highway System; Primary; Auxiliary
← G329	→ G331

China National Highway 330 (G330) runs northwest from Wenzhou, Zhejiang towards Shouchang, Zhejiang. It is 327 kilometres in length.

== Route and distance ==
Route and distance

City	Distance (km)
Wenzhou, Zhejiang	0
Qingtian, Zhejiang	53
Lishui, Zhejiang	124
Jinyun, Zhejiang	161
Yongkang, Zhejiang	200
Jinhua, Zhejiang	254
Lanxi, Zhejiang	284
Shouchang, Zhejiang	327

== See also ==
- China National Highways
