= Dixiachanghe Underground River =

Tourist attraction in Zhejiang, China

The Dixiachanghe Underground River (Chinese: 地下长河) is a grade AAA tourist attraction in Lanxi, Zhejiang, China. It is known by the local people as Liudong Shan (Chinese: 六洞山). It is in Liudong Mountain Scenic Area.

== Transit ==
There are three ways to access this attraction. They are by Long Distance Bus, Regular buses, and by car.

=== Long Distance Bus ===
There are long distance buses departing from Dixiachanghe to Shanghai, Suzhou, Hanzhou, Ningbo, and other cities. The bus to Hangzhou departs eight times every day.

=== Bus ===
The Lanxi Route 301 buses' terminal is Dixiachanghe. It departs every 20–30 minutes. The first bus operates at 5:50 and the last bus operates at 17:30.

=== Roads ===
The Dixiachanghe Underground River is accessible by several roads.

== Scenic Area ==
The Dixiachanghe is a cave located in Liudong Mountain Scenic Area. As its name suggests, there is a river in the cave.

=== Entrance ===
To enter the cave visitors ride a boat that an employee steers. The visitors wait for the boat at a building located in the front of the mountain.

=== Rocks of Strange Shapes ===
The stones inside the cave sometimes have interesting shapes, such as Snow Piled Up.

=== Illumination ===
These stones are lit up by lights with different colors.
