= Hongshi Cement =

Chinese cement manufacturer

- Industry: Cement
- Headquarters: Lanxi, Zhejiang
- Products: Cement
- Parent: Hongshi Holdings
- Website: https://www.hongshigroup.com

Hongshi Cement (also called Red Lion Cement) is a Chinese cement manufacturer with cement plants in China, Laos, Nepal, and Indonesia.

Goldman Sachs owns a 25% stake in the company, having acquired it for RMB 600 million in a deal signed in 2007.
