= Zhongzhou Park =

Park in Lanxi, Zhejiang, China

The Zhongzhou Park (Chinese: 中洲公园; lit. 'Middle of River Park') is a park in Lanxi, Zhejiang, China. It is located on an island in the Lanjiang River.

== Features ==
=== Access ===
This park has floating bridges on both sides of the island. One has a swinging part to allow boats to pass the bridge.

=== Statue ===
There is a statue of Lanhua, a symbol of the city of Lanxi.
