= Zhuge Village =

Zhuge 諸葛村
- Village
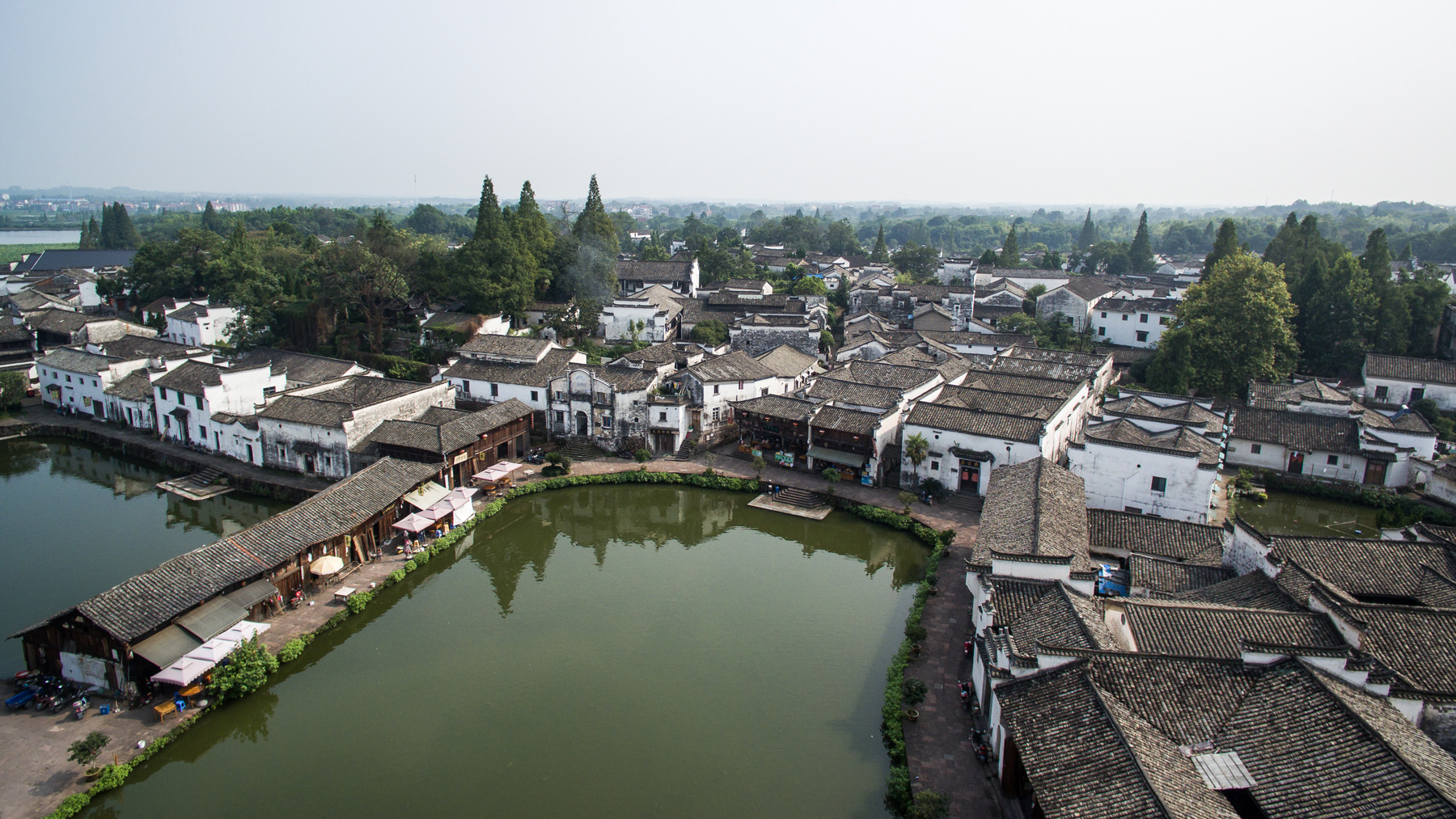

- Location in Zhejiang
- Coordinates: 29°14′57″N 119°17′44″E
- Country: People's Republic of China
- Province: Zhejiang
- Prefecture-level city: Jinhua
- County-level city: Lanxi
- Town: Zhuge

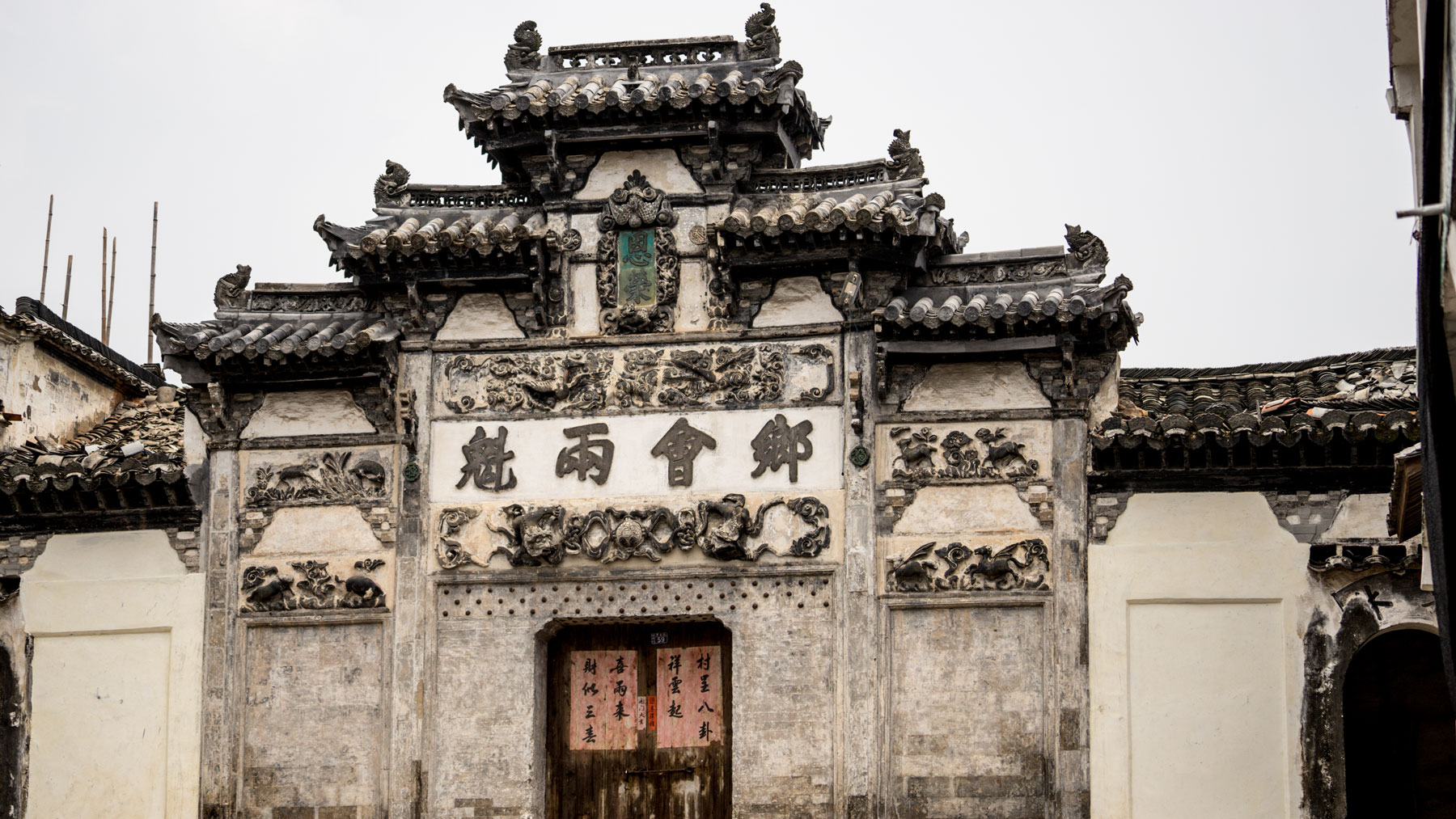

Zhuge Village or Zhugecun (traditional Chinese: 諸葛村; simplified Chinese: 诸葛村; pinyin: Zhūgě Cūn) is a historic village located in Zhuge town (诸葛镇), Lanxi, Jinhua, Zhejiang Province, China. Originally called Gaolong (高隆), the village changed its name to Zhuge during the Ming Dynasty due to the prevalence of the Zhuge surname among the villagers. The residents claim they are the descendants of the famed Shu Han chancellor Zhuge Liang of the 3rd century CE. The village was designated a national heritage site in 1996, and contains relics which are 700 years old.

== Population ==
"The majority of villagers living in Zhuge Village today constitute a full quarter of Zhuge Liang’s remaining 16,000 46th- to 55th-generation descendants." According to the population census completed in the end of 1992, there are about 890 families and 2879 people in the village.

== Architectural composition ==
The architectural composition of Zhuge Village is very rare and peculiar. Buildings are arranged in an orderly fashion, according to the bagua principles of feng shui, earning it the title of Zhuge Bagua Village. The buildings are imposing and majestic structures. The unique skyline of the village was designed to commemorate Zhuge Liang by a descendant during the Southern Song dynasty, Zhuge Dashi (諸葛大師).

== See also ==
- Xinye Village
