= Huangdian, Zhejiang =

Huangdian 黄店镇
- Town
- Location in Zhejiang
- Coordinates: 29°18′04″N 119°25′05″E
- Country: People's Republic of China
- Province: Zhejiang
- Prefecture-level city: Jinhua
- County-level city: Lanxi
- Village-level divisions: 46 villages
- Elevation: 50 m (160 ft)
- Time zone: UTC+8 (China Standard)
- Area code: 0579

Huangdian (simplified Chinese: 黄店; traditional Chinese: 黃店; pinyin: Huángdiàn) is a town under the administration of Lanxi City in western Zhejiang province, China, located 10 kilometres (6.2 mi) northwest of downtown Lanxi. As of 2011, it has 46 villages under its administration.

== Geography ==
Zhiyan Reservoir is a reservoir located in the town.

== See also ==
- List of township-level divisions of Zhejiang
