= Zhuge, Lanxi =

Town in Lanxi, Zhejiang Province, China

Coordinates: 29.25731°N 119.28755°E

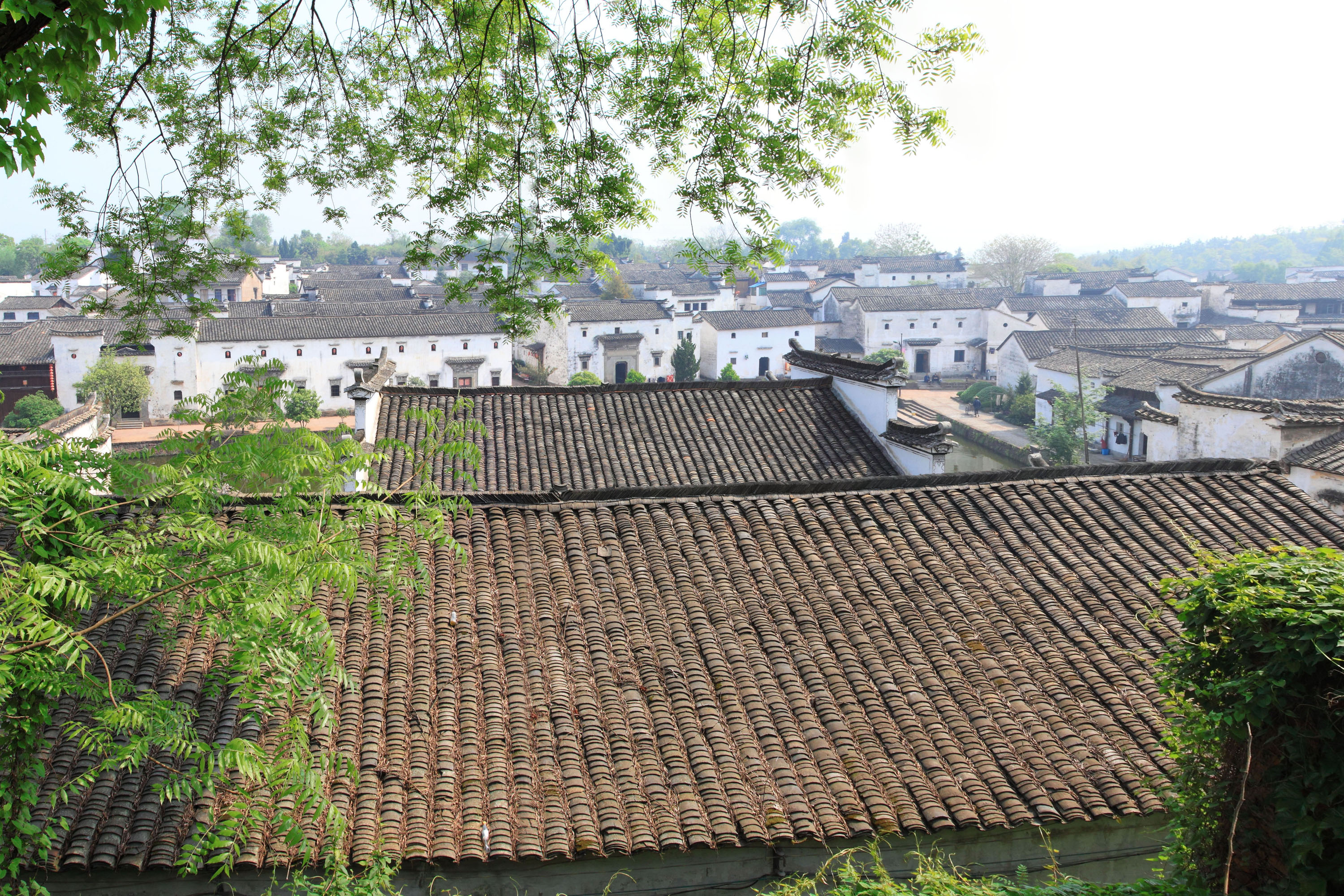
The Zhuge Village Dwellings, a Major Historical and Cultural Site

Zhuge is a town in Lanxi, Jinhua, Zhejiang, People's Republic of China. Many of the town's residents are the descendants of Zhuge Liang, especially in Zhuge Village.

== Administrative divisions ==
Zhuge is divided into the following divisions:

Zhuge Community, Zhuge Village, Xiaxu Village, Dianhouzhu Village, Gutangfan Village, Wengjia Village, Yejia Village, Hengfan Village, Shuangtangxia Village, Houlunqiao Village, Changle Village, Wantian Village, Yintang Village, Shangxu Village, Qianzhai Village, Shuofan Village, Hujia Village, Yanshanjiao Village, Shuangpai Village, Shetangbian Village, Quantang Village, Wutairen Village, Houlunfang Village, Getangzhu Village, Chuantangxia Village, Xiashan Village, Zhoucun, Guancun and Houlunhu Villages.
