= China National Highway 329 =

Road in China

National Highway 329
- 329国道

Route information
- Length: 292 km (181 mi)

Major junctions
- From: Hangzhou
- To: Shenjiamen in Zhejiang

Location
- Country: China

Highway system
- National Trunk Highway System; Primary; Auxiliary
| ← G328 | → G330 |

China National Highway 329 (G329) runs from Hangzhou to Shenjiamen in Zhejiang. It is 292 kilometres in length and runs east from Hangzhou, going through Shaoxing and Ningbo.

== Route and distance ==
Route and distance

| City | Distance (km) |
|---|---|
| Hangzhou, Zhejiang | 0 |
| Xiaoshan, Zhejiang | 34 |
| Shaoxing, Zhejiang | 75 |
| Shangyu, Zhejiang | 110 |
| Cixi, Zhejiang | 152 |
| Ningbo, Zhejiang | 216 |
| Baifeng, Zhejiang | 262 |
| Zhoushan, Zhejiang | 268 |
| Putuo District, Zhejiang | 292 |

== See also ==
- China National Highways
