= Daciyan =

Daciyan 大慈岩镇
- Town
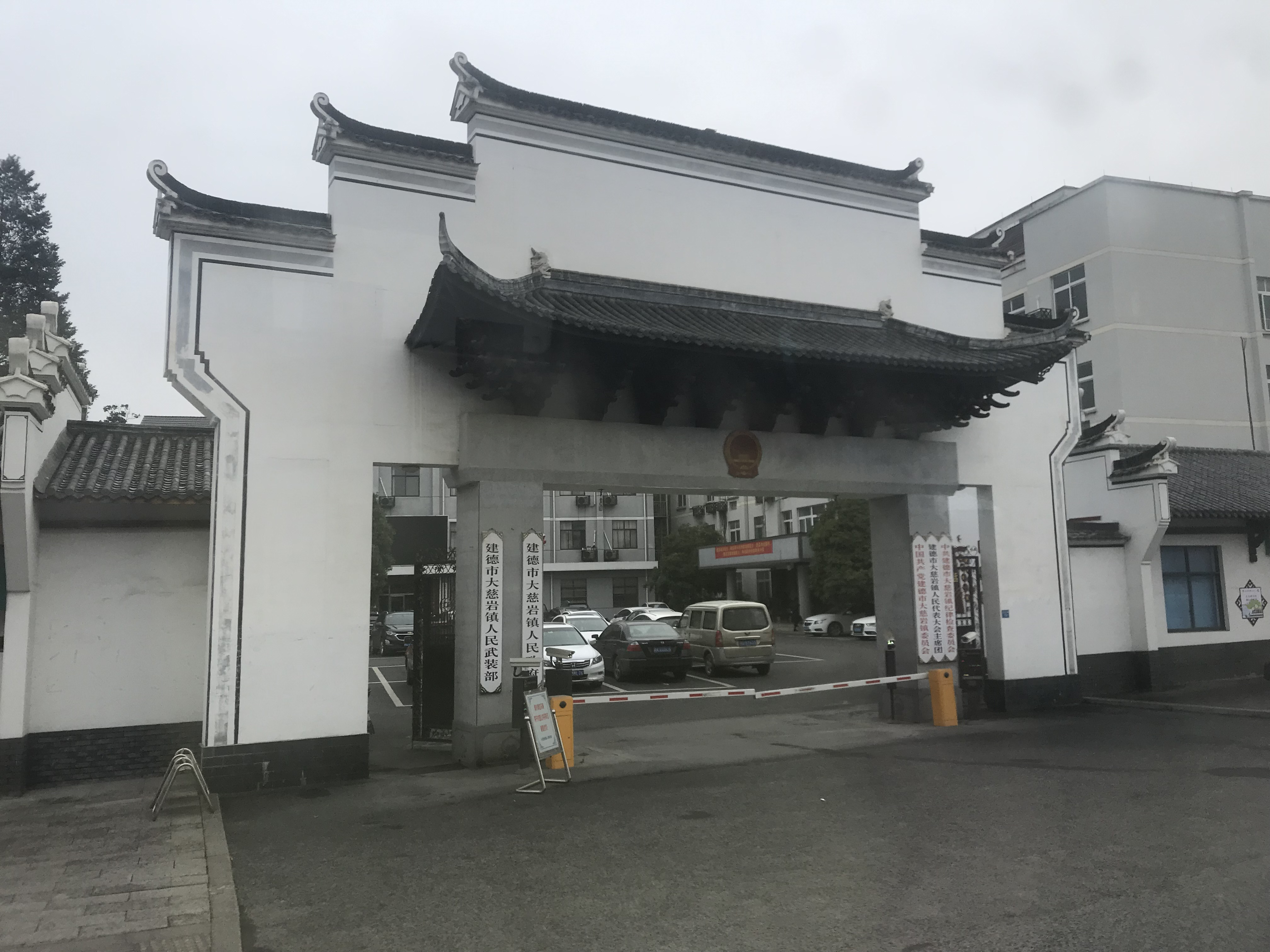
- Entrance to the government buildings of Daciyan

- Location in Zhejiang
- Coordinates: 29°17′28″N 119°17′34″E
- Country: People's Republic of China
- Province: Zhejiang
- Prefecture-level city: Hangzhou
- County-level city: Jiande
- Time zone: UTC+8 (China Standard)

Daciyan (Chinese: 大慈岩; pinyin: Dàcíyán) is a town in Jiande, Zhejiang province, China. As of 2020, it administers Daciyan Residential Community and the following twelve villages:

- Daciyan Village
- Shangwufang Village (上吴方村)
- Xinye Village (新叶村)
- Li Village (李村)
- Sanyuan Village (三元村)
- Tan Village (檀村)
- Wushan Village (吴山村)
- Liye Village (里叶村)
- Shuangquan Village (双泉村)
- Chendian Village (陈店村)
- Shishan Village (狮山村)
- Wangshan Village (汪山村)
