= Lijia, Zhejiang =

Lijia 李家镇
- Town
- Location in Zhejiang
- Coordinates: 29°19′30″N 119°1′58″E
- Country: People's Republic of China
- Province: Zhejiang
- Prefecture-level city: Hangzhou
- County-level city: Jiande
- Time zone: UTC+8 (China Standard)

Lijia (Chinese: 李家; pinyin: Lǐjiā) is a town in Jiande, Zhejiang province, China. As of 2020, it administers Lijia Residential Community and the following ten villages:

- Lijia Village
- Zhujia Village (诸家村)
- Xinqiao Village (新桥村)
- Sanxi Village (三溪村)
- Xinlian Village (新联村)
- Longqiao Village (龙桥村)
- Shaduntou Village (沙墩头村)
- Changlin Village (长林村)
- Baima Village (白马村)
- Shigu Village (石鼓村)
