= Genglou Subdistrict =

Genglou Subdistrict 更楼街道
- Subdistrict
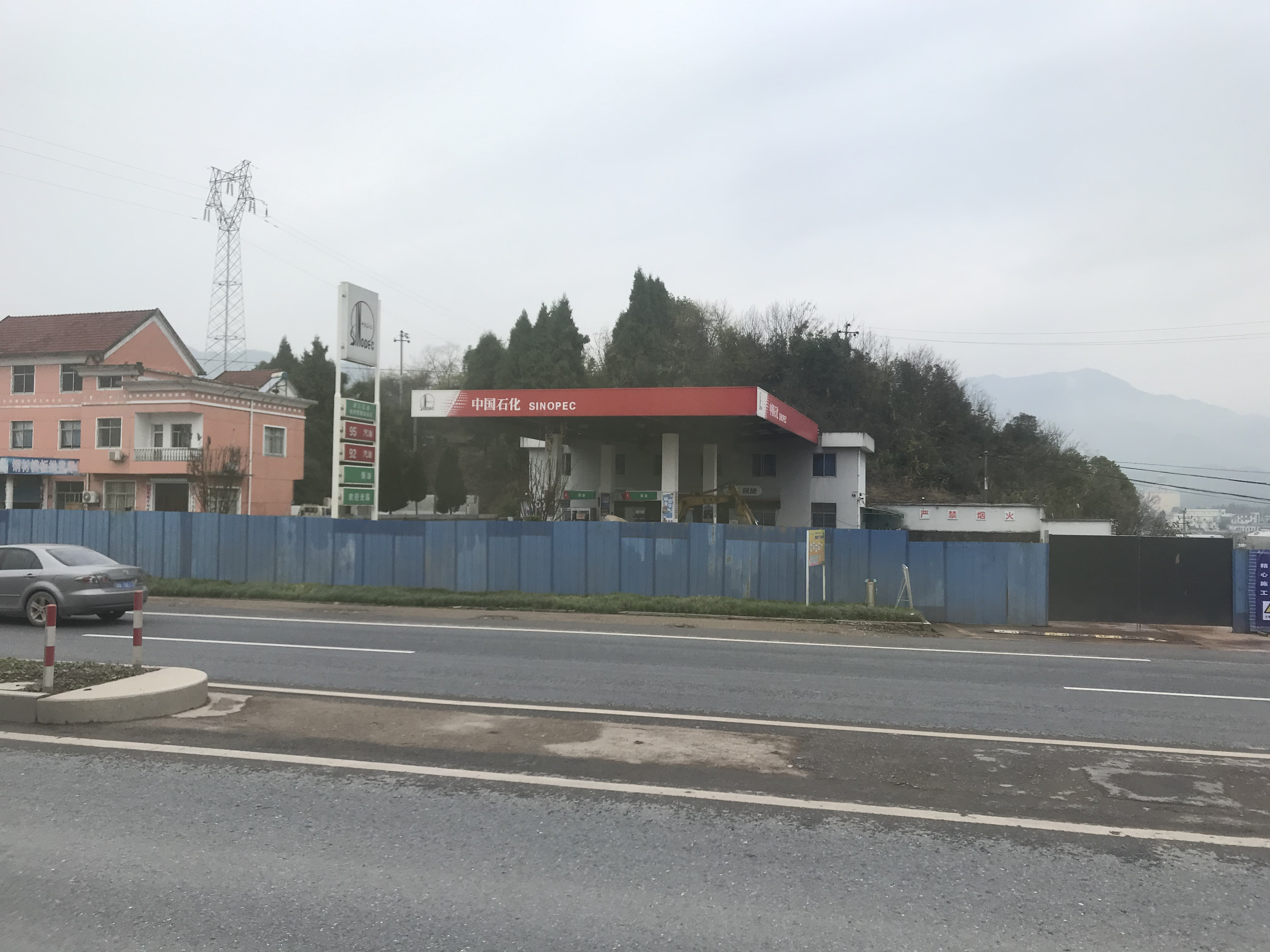
- A gas station in Genglou Subdistrict

- Location in Zhejiang
- Coordinates: 29°25′59″N 119°15′29″E
- Country: People's Republic of China
- Province: Zhejiang
- Prefecture-level city: Hangzhou
- County-level city: Jiande
- Time zone: UTC+8 (China Standard)

Genglou Subdistrict (simplified Chinese: 更楼街道; traditional Chinese: 更樓街道; pinyin: Gēnglóu Jiēdào) is a subdistrict in Jiande, Zhejiang, China. As of 2020, it administers the following three residential neighborhoods and 14 villages:

- Genglou Community
- Genghua Community (更化社区)
- Dengjia (邓家)
- Zhangjia Village (张家村)
- Luo Village (骆村)
- Houtang Village (后塘村)
- Hucenfan Village (湖岑畈村)
- Xinshi Village (新市村)
- Huang'ao Village (黄岙村)
- Ganxi Village (甘溪村)
- Yuhe Village (于合村)
- Yanyuan Village (岩源村)
- Hongzhai Village (洪宅村)
- Qiaoling Village (桥岭村)
- Dengjia Village (邓家村)
- Shiling Village (石岭村)
- Xule Village (许乐村)

== See also ==
- List of township-level divisions of Zhejiang
