= Xin'anjiang Subdistrict =

Xin'anjiang Subdistrict 新安江街道
- Subdistrict
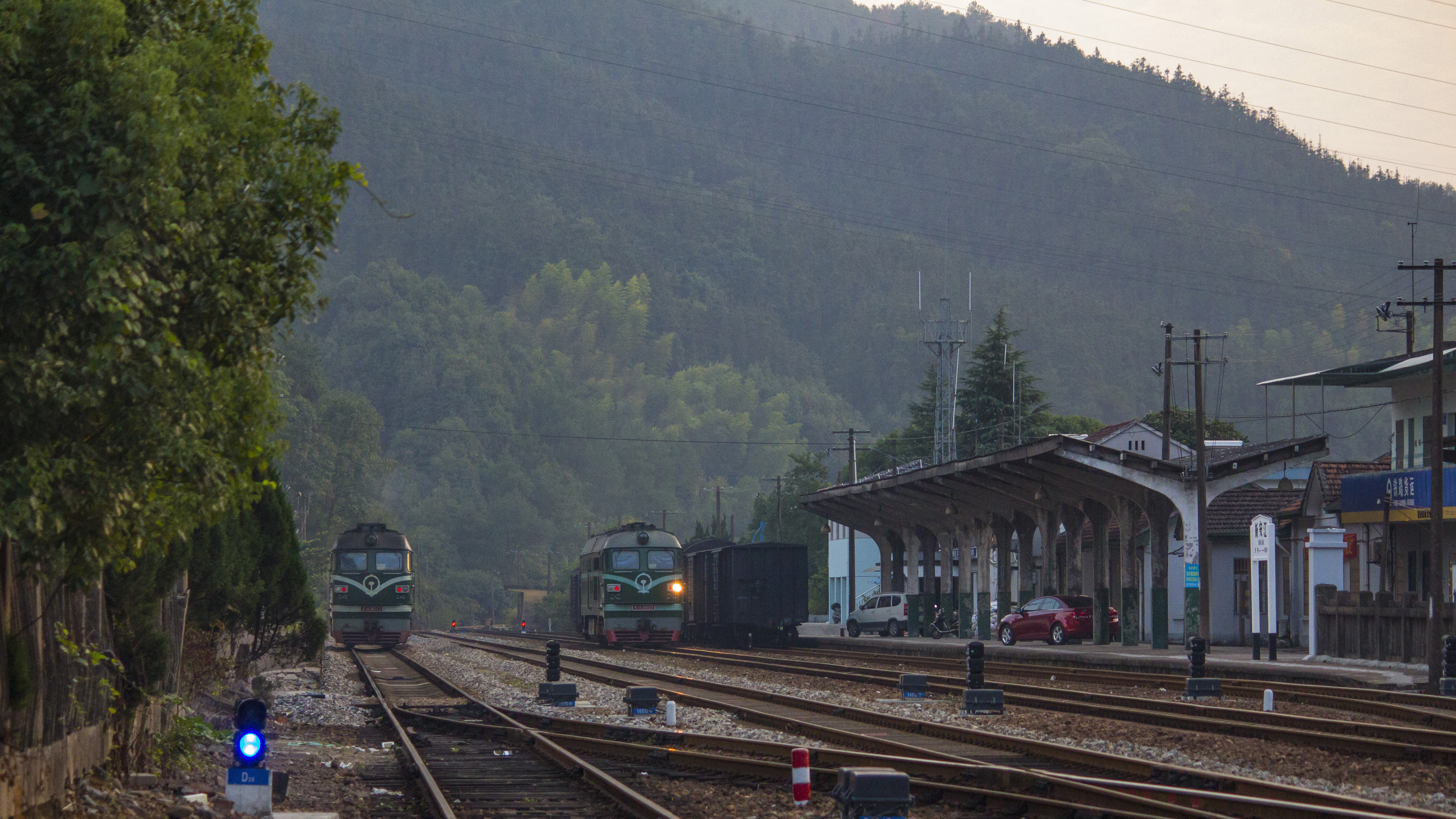
- Xin'anjiang Railway Station

- Location in Zhejiang
- Coordinates: 29°28′35″N 119°16′7″E
- Country: People's Republic of China
- Province: Zhejiang
- Prefecture-level city: Hangzhou
- County-level city: Jiande
- Time zone: UTC+8 (China Standard)

Xin'anjiang Subdistrict (Chinese: 新安江街道; pinyin: Xīn'ānjiāng Jiēdào) is a subdistrict in Jiande, Zhejiang, China. As of 2020, it administers the following eleven residential communities and four villages:

- Baisha Community (白沙社区)
- Fudong Community (府东社区)
- Fuxi Community (府西社区)
- Cangtan Community (沧滩社区)
- Luotong Community (罗桐社区)
- Xin'an Community (新安社区)
- Jian'an Community (健安社区)
- Xitou Community (溪头社区)
- Mingzhu Community (明珠社区)
- Linghou Community (岭后社区)
- Yejia Community (叶家社区)
- Xinpeng Village (新蓬村)
- Meiping Village (梅坪村)
- Huangnidun Village (黄泥墩村)
- Fengchan Village (丰产村)

== See also ==
- List of township-level divisions of Zhejiang
