= Hangtou, Zhejiang =

Hangtou 航头镇
- Town
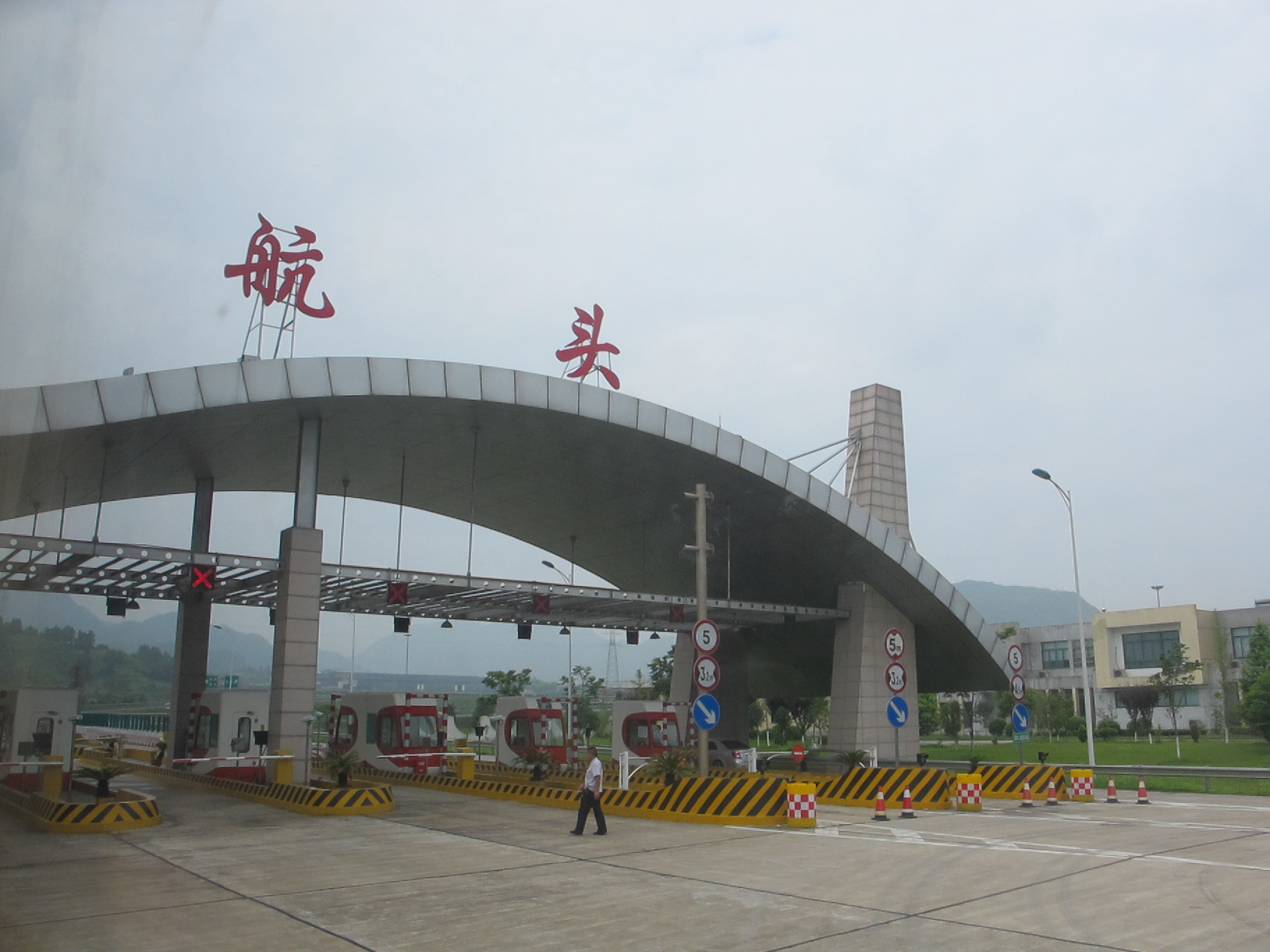
- The Hangtou exit of the G25 Changchun–Shenzhen Expressway

- Location in Zhejiang
- Coordinates: 29°20′4″N 119°10′46″E
- Country: People's Republic of China
- Province: Zhejiang
- Prefecture-level city: Hangzhou
- County-level city: Jiande
- Time zone: UTC+8 (China Standard)

Hangtou (Chinese: 航头; pinyin: Hángtóu) is a town in Jiande, Zhejiang province, China. As of 2020, it administers Hangtou Residential Community and the following 18 villages:

- Hangtou Village
- Luoyuan Village (罗源村)
- Pengjia Village (彭家村)
- Tianfan Village (田畈村)
- Dong Village (东村)
- Hangjing Village (航景村)
- Huangmugang Village (黄木岗村)
- Xiyan Village (溪沿村)
- Hangchuan Village (航川村)
- Wulong Village (乌龙村)
- Qianyuan Village (千源村)
- Dadiankou Village (大店口村)
- Shimuling Village (石木岭村)
- Yutang Village (钰塘村)
- Shiping Village (石屏村)
- Lingqi Village (灵栖村)
- Nanping Village (南屏村)
- Caoyuan Village (曹源村)
