= Shouchang, Zhejiang =

Town in Zhejiang, China

Shouchang 寿昌镇
- Town
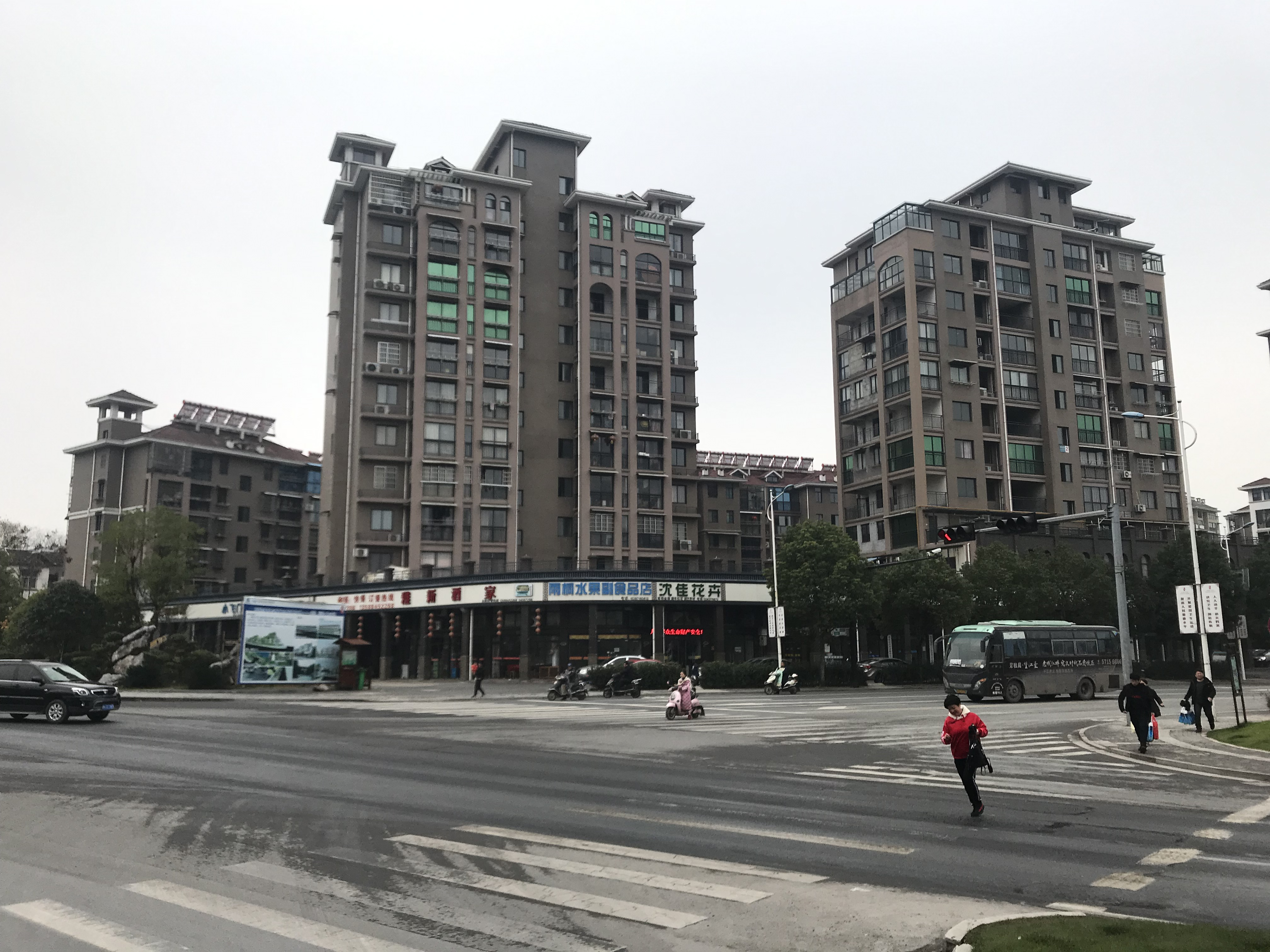
- Shouchang in 2018

- Location in Zhejiang
- Coordinates: 29°21′40″N 119°13′00″E
- Country: People's Republic of China
- Province: Zhejiang
- Prefecture-level city: Hangzhou
- County-level city: Jiande

Area
  - Total: 94.71 km^{2} (36.57 sq mi)

Population (2005)
  - Total: 46,416
  - Density: 490.1/km^{2} (1,269/sq mi)
- Time zone: UTC+8 (China Standard)

Shouchang (Chinese: 寿昌; pinyin: shòuchāng) is a town located in the western part of Zhejiang Province, China, currently under the administration of Jiande City.

== Administration ==
As of 2020, it administers the following four residential communities and 23 villages:

- Hengshan Community (横山社区)
- Dongchang Community (东昌社区)
- Aixi (Xihu) Community (艾溪（西湖）社区)
- Wangjiang Community (望江社区)
- Sanyan Village (三岩村)
- Shiquan Village (石泉村)
- Dongmen Village (东门村)
- Chengbei Village (城北村)
- Chengzhong Village (城中村)
- Henanli Village (河南里村)
- Shibaqiao Village (十八桥村)
- Bujiapeng Village (卜家蓬村)
- Honglu Village (红路村)
- Yuhong Village (余洪村)
- Datangbian Village (大塘边村)
- Chenjia Village (陈家村)
- Shanfeng Village (山峰村)
- Guihua Village (桂花村)
- Yongjiaqiao Village (永嘉桥村)
- Nanpu Village (南浦村)
- Ximen Village (西门村)
- Zhou Village (周村)
- Tongjia Village (童家村)
- Lühetang Village (绿荷塘村)
- Xihua Village (西华村)
- Wushi Village (乌石村)
- Jinqiao Village (金桥村)

== History ==
The county was established in 225 AD with the name Xinchang, during the Three Kingdoms Period. The name was changed to Shouchang In 280 AD. It was formerly a separate county, but was merged into Jiande in the 1950s.

== GDP ==
- Industrial Production: RMB ¥1.38 billion in 2005
- Agricultural Production: RMB ¥167 million in 2005
- Expenditure on R&D: RMB ¥285 million in 2005

== Transport ==
- The nearest major airport is Hangzhou Xiaoshan International Airport. Quzhou Airport and Yiwu Airport are closer but much smaller.
- China National Highway 320
- China National Highway 330
- Hangxinjing Expressway
- Jinqian Railway
