= Jiande =

Jiande 建德市 Kienteh
- County-level city
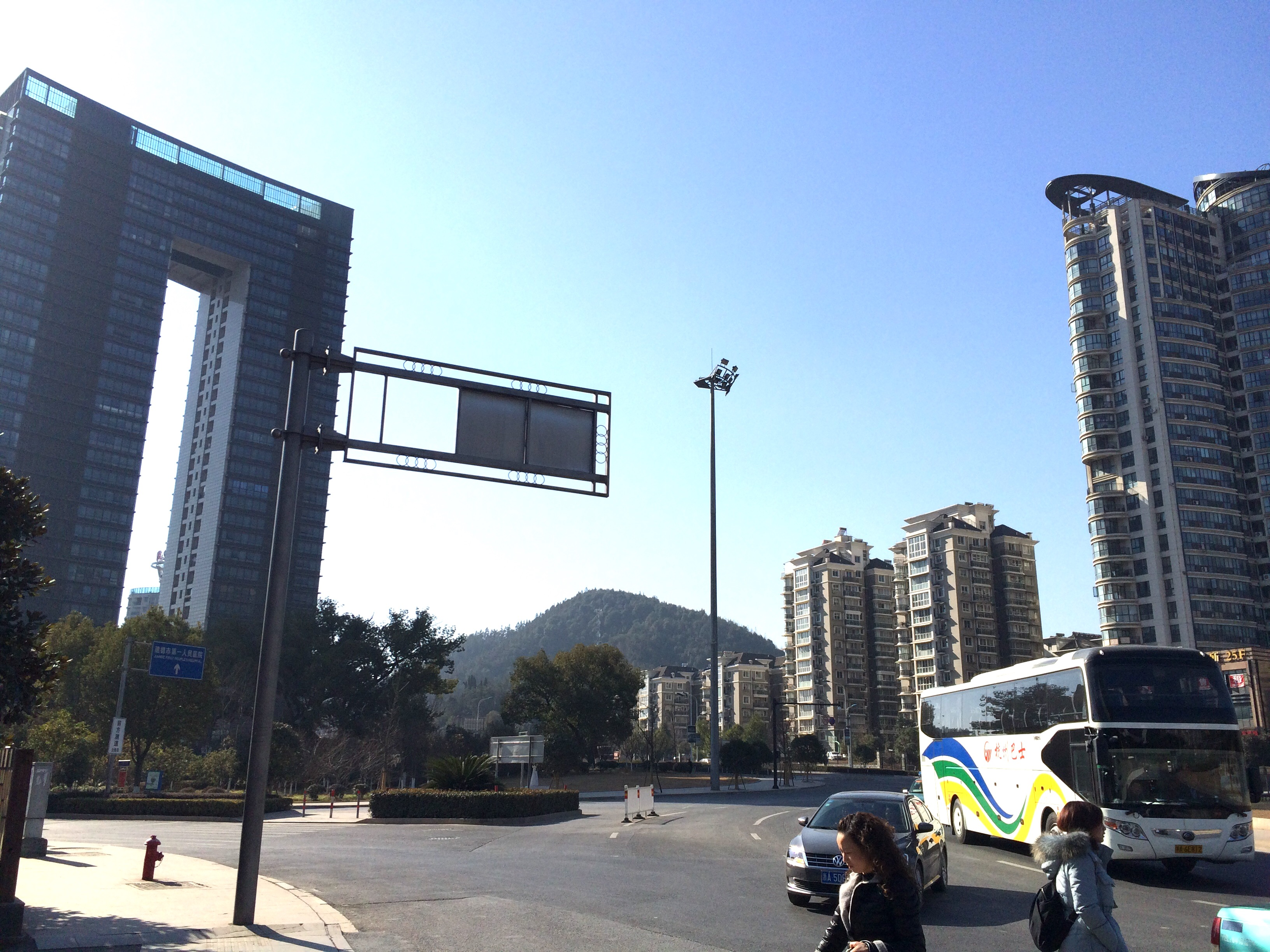

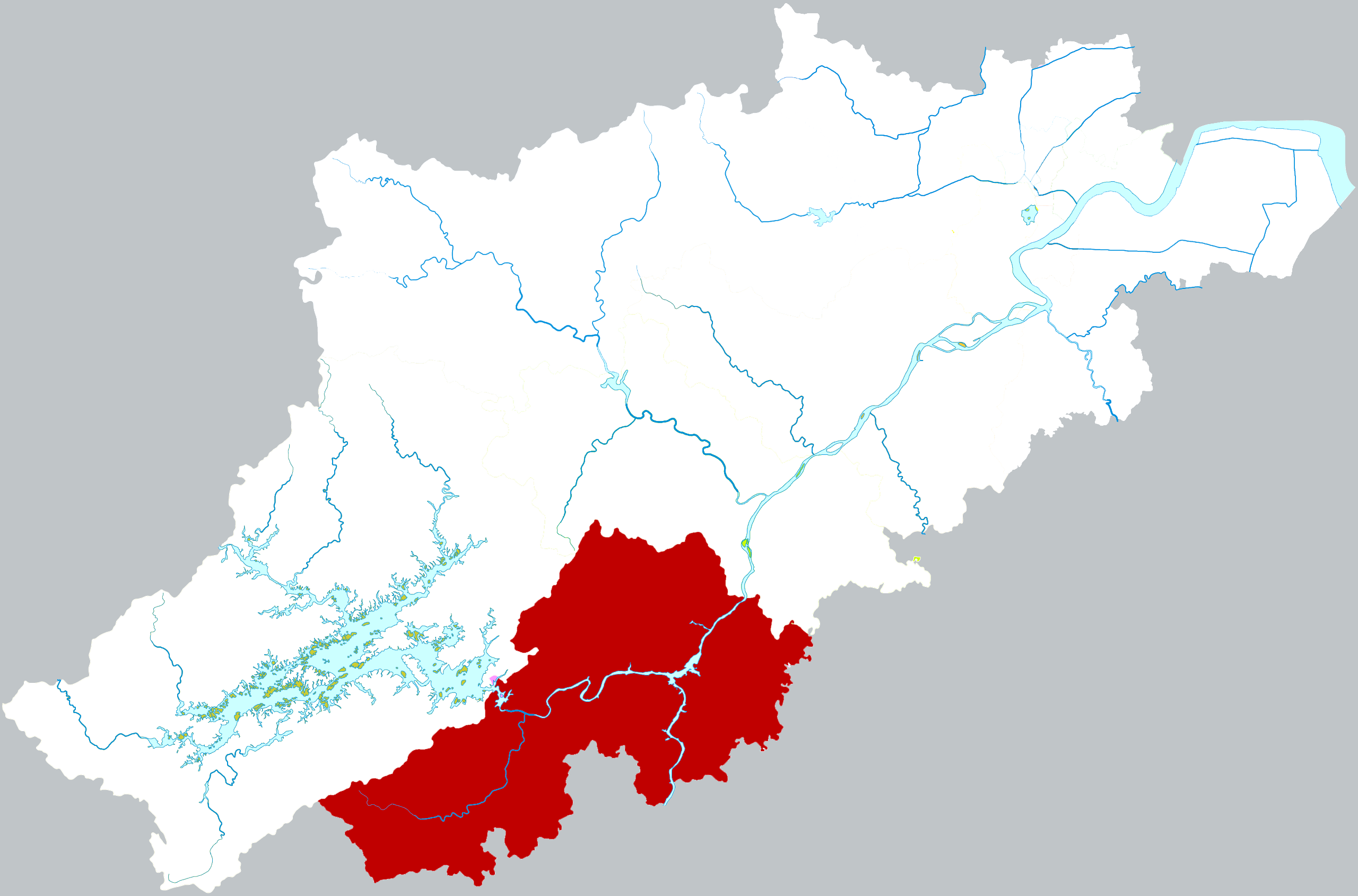
- Location of Jiande City within Hangzhou

- Location in Zhejiang
- Coordinates: 29.4896°N 119.337°E
- Country: People's Republic of China
- Province: Zhejiang
- Sub-provincial city: Hangzhou
- Seat: Xin'anjiang

Area
  - Total: 2,314.19 km^{2} (893.51 sq mi)
- Time zone: UTC+8 (China Standard)
- Postal code: 311600

Jiande is a county-level city of Zhejiang Province, East China, under the administration of the prefecture-level city of Hangzhou, the capital of the province.

== History ==
During the Ming and Qing Dynasties, Jiande was the capital of Yanzhou Prefecture. On account of this, Jiande was often referred to as Yanzhou Fu (严州府). A transcription commonly seen in both French and English writing of the time was Yen-tcheou-fou, derived from French missionary writing.

== Administrative divisions ==
Subdistricts:

- Yangxi Subdistrict (洋溪街道), Genglou Subdistrict (更楼街道), Xin'anjiang Subdistrict (新安江街道)

Towns:

- Meicheng (梅城镇), Xiaya (下涯镇), Yangcunqiao (杨村桥镇), Qiantan (乾潭镇), Sandu (三都镇), Shouchang (寿昌镇), Datong (大同镇), Hangtou (航头镇), Lijia (李家镇), Dayang (大洋镇), Lianhua (莲花镇), Daciyan (大慈岩镇)

The only township is Qintang Township (钦堂乡)

== Climate ==
Climate data for Jiande, elevation 89 m (292 ft), (1991–2020 normals, extremes 1981–present)
Month	Jan	Feb	Mar	Apr	May	Jun	Jul	Aug	Sep	Oct	Nov	Dec	Year
Record high °C (°F)	25.0 (77.0)	28.7 (83.7)	34.8 (94.6)	36.0 (96.8)	36.9 (98.4)	37.9 (100.2)	42.9 (109.2)	42.8 (109.0)	40.2 (104.4)	39.4 (102.9)	31.7 (89.1)	25.0 (77.0)	42.9 (109.2)
Mean daily maximum °C (°F)	9.9 (49.8)	12.6 (54.7)	17.0 (62.6)	23.1 (73.6)	27.6 (81.7)	29.6 (85.3)	34.4 (93.9)	34.1 (93.4)	29.7 (85.5)	24.7 (76.5)	18.8 (65.8)	12.6 (54.7)	22.8 (73.1)
Daily mean °C (°F)	5.3 (41.5)	7.3 (45.1)	11.2 (52.2)	16.8 (62.2)	21.6 (70.9)	24.5 (76.1)	28.4 (83.1)	28.1 (82.6)	24.1 (75.4)	18.9 (66.0)	13.1 (55.6)	7.4 (45.3)	17.2 (63.0)
Mean daily minimum °C (°F)	2.3 (36.1)	3.9 (39.0)	7.4 (45.3)	12.5 (54.5)	17.3 (63.1)	21.1 (70.0)	24.2 (75.6)	24.1 (75.4)	20.3 (68.5)	14.8 (58.6)	9.4 (48.9)	3.9 (39.0)	13.4 (56.2)
Record low °C (°F)	−6.3 (20.7)	−6.2 (20.8)	−3.4 (25.9)	1.1 (34.0)	8.5 (47.3)	12.3 (54.1)	18.2 (64.8)	18.3 (64.9)	10.4 (50.7)	3.4 (38.1)	−1.6 (29.1)	−8.0 (17.6)	−8.0 (17.6)
Average precipitation mm (inches)	91.3 (3.59)	100.8 (3.97)	165.4 (6.51)	179.5 (7.07)	192.7 (7.59)	319.2 (12.57)	163.2 (6.43)	155.5 (6.12)	98.2 (3.87)	52.4 (2.06)	78.5 (3.09)	66.4 (2.61)	1,663.1 (65.48)
Average precipitation days (≥ 0.1 mm)	13.8	13.1	16.9	15.7	15.8	17.8	12.1	13.6	9.9	7.8	10.8	10.6	157.9
Average snowy days	3.6	2.7	0.6	0	0	0	0	0	0	0	0.1	1.4	8.4
Average relative humidity (%)	78	78	78	77	77	83	78	78	78	76	79	77	78
Mean monthly sunshine hours	95.4	95.8	118.0	138.3	156.7	125.6	217.5	208.3	163.1	159.6	122.9	115.8	1,717
Percentage possible sunshine	29	30	32	36	37	30	51	51	44	45	39	36	38
Source: China Meteorological Administration all-time extreme temperature all-time September Record High

== Transportation ==
Direct trains for freight link Jiande with Yiwu and Jinhua. There is also a high-speed rail station.

== See also ==
- Xinye Village, a village in Jiande
