= Lanxi, Zhejiang =

Lanxi 兰溪市 Lanchi
- County-level city
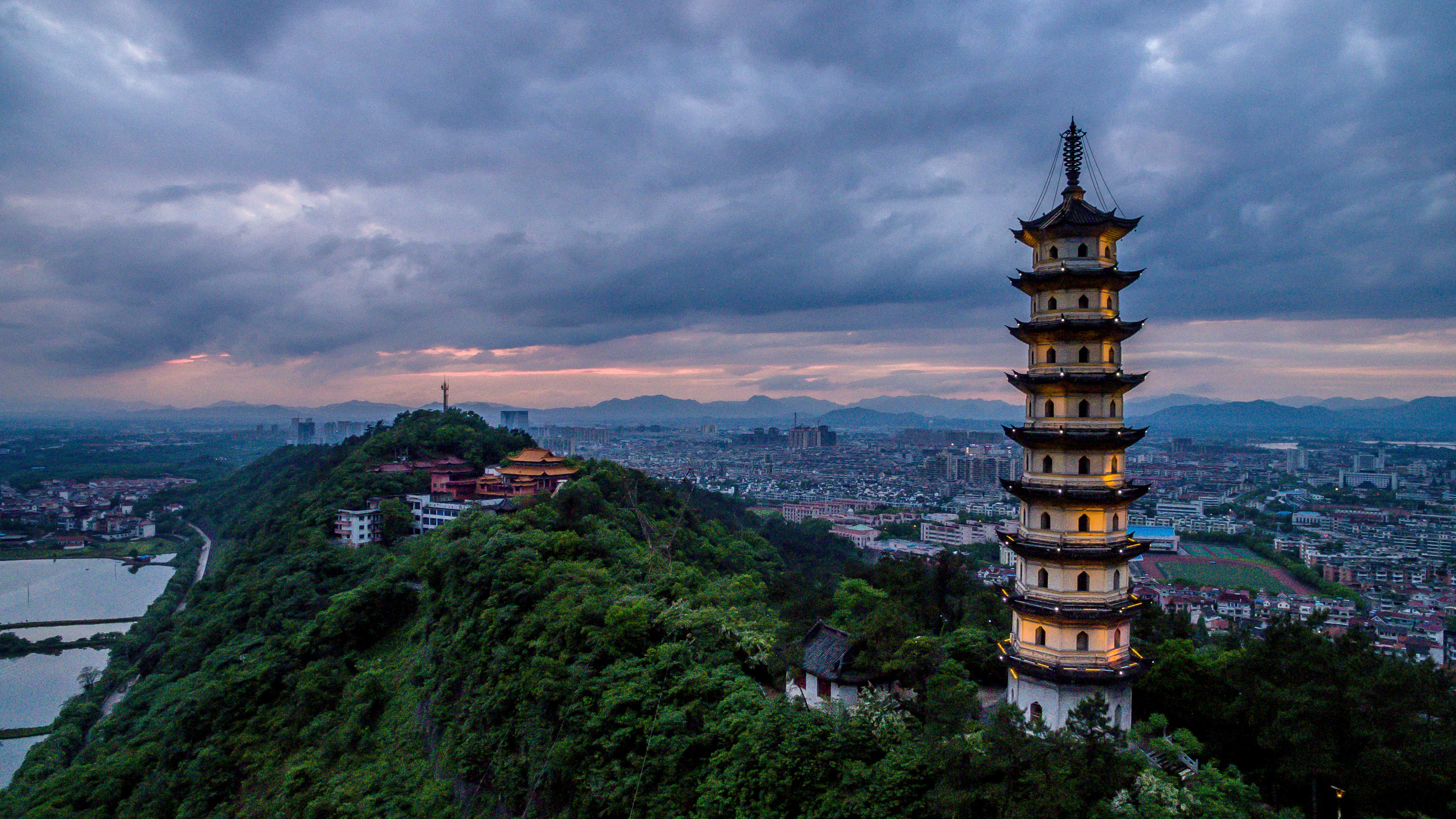
- Juren Tower in memorial of Cao Juren (曹聚仁) on the top of Mountain Hengfeng, lying in the southwest of downtown Lanxi

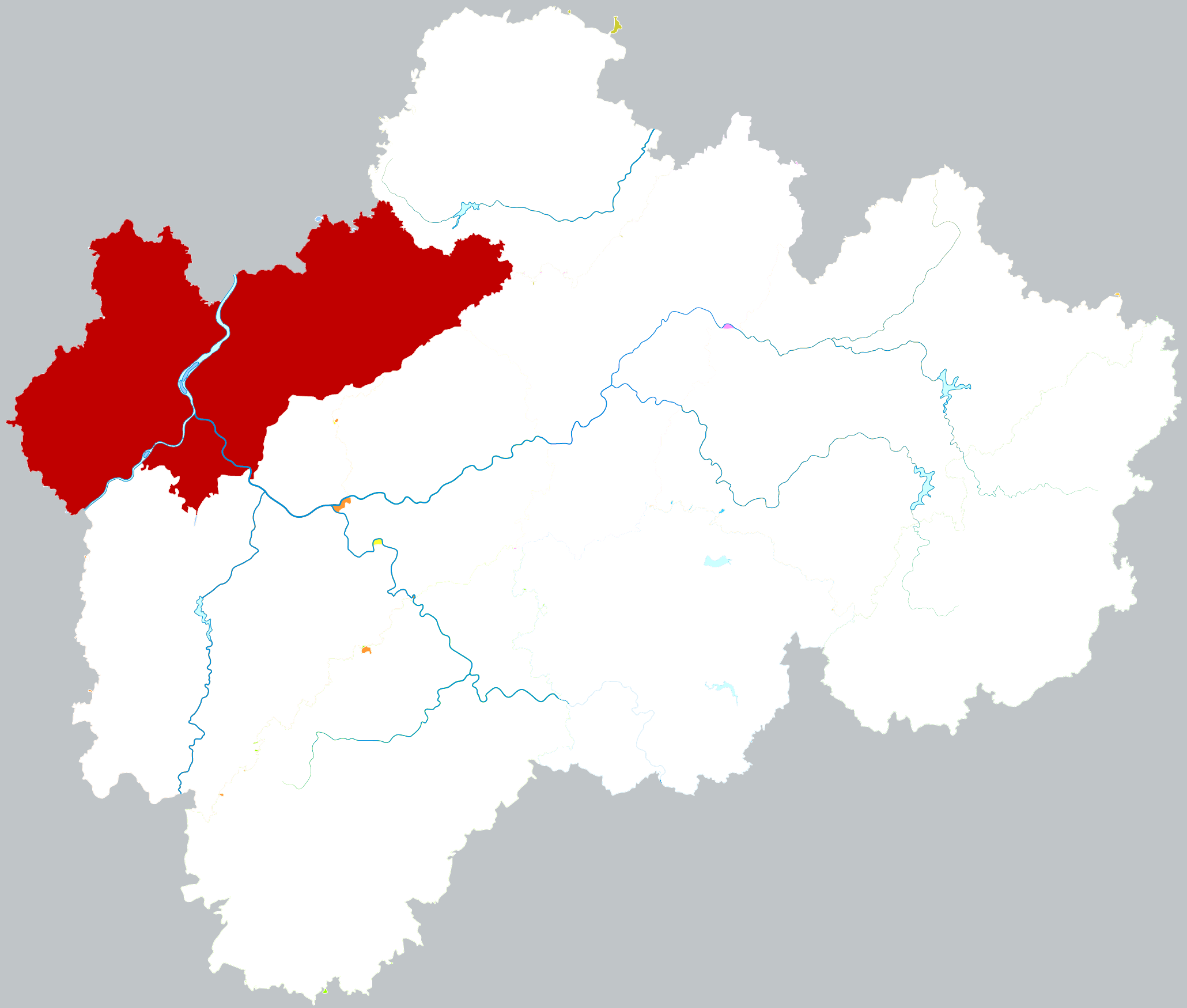
- Location of Lanxi City within Jinhua

- Location in Zhejiang
- Coordinates: 29.208°N 119.458°E
- Country: People's Republic of China
- Province: Zhejiang
- Prefecture-level city: Jinhua

Area
  - Total: 1,312.44 km^{2} (506.74 sq mi)

Population (2020)
  - Total: 574,801
  - Density: 437.964/km^{2} (1,134.32/sq mi)
- Time zone: UTC+8 (China Standard)
- Website: http://www.lanxi.gov.cn/

Lanxi
- Simplified Chinese: 兰溪市
- Traditional Chinese: 蘭谿市
Transcriptions
Standard Mandarin
- Hanyu Pinyin: Lánxī Shì
- Bopomofo: ㄌㄢˊ ㄒㄧ ㄕˋ
- Wade–Giles: Lanchi Shih
Wu
- Romanization: lae^{平} chi^{平} zy^{上}
Hakka
- Romanization: Lhài-qit-sṳ
Yue: Cantonese
- Jyutping: Lam^{4}kei^{1} si^{5}
Southern Min
- Hokkien POJ: Lâm-qi-chhī
Eastern Min
- Fuzhou BUC: Luà-qie̤k

Lanxi, alternately known as Lanchi and Lanki, is a county-level city under the administration of the prefecture-level city of Jinhua in west-central Zhejiang Province, east-central China.

The city executive, legislature and judiciary are at Lanjiang Subdistrict (兰江街道), together with the CPC and PSB branches. The town lies on the Lan River (Lanjiang), a tributary of the Fuchun River, both north-flowing; the Fuchun River empties into Hangzhou Bay.

== Population history ==
Year	Population
2013	666,700
2017	660,000
2025	635,200

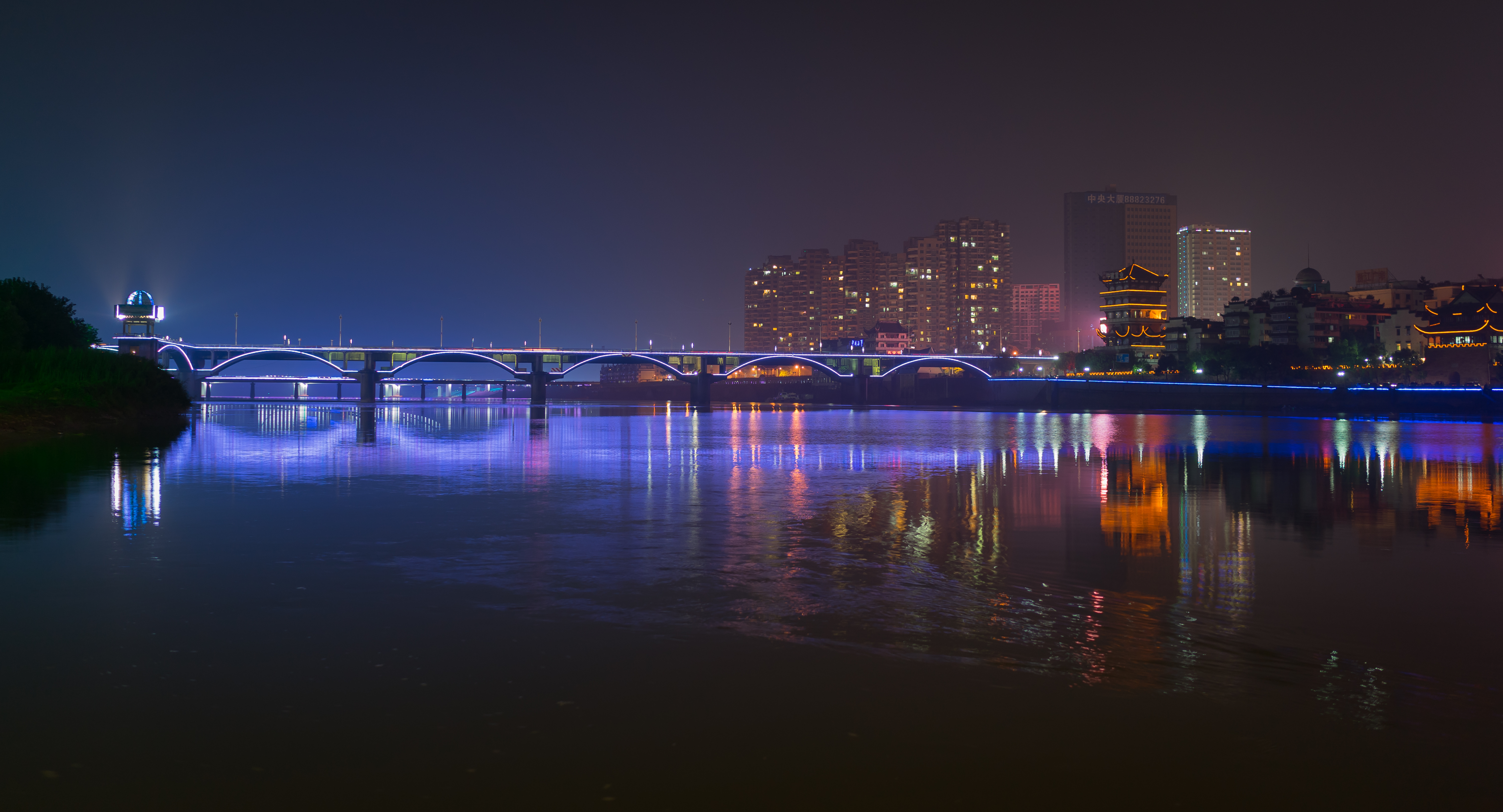
Night skyline

== Administration ==
=== Towns (镇; zhèn) ===
- Huangdian (黄店)
- Zhuge (诸葛)
- Majian (馬澗)
- Youbu (游埠)

Notice that Lanjiang Zhen had been cancelled and changed into Lanjiang Jiedao.

=== Subdistricts (街道; jiēdào) ===
- Lanjiang (兰江)
- Chixi (赤溪)
- Nyubu (女埠)

Notice that some of the area of Nyubu had been accepted by Lanjiang Jiedao.

- Yunshan (云山)
- Yongchang (永昌)
- Shanghua (上华)

=== Townships (乡; xiāng) ===
- Shuiting She Ethnic Township (水亭畲族乡)

=== Historic Villages ===
- Zhuge Village

== Climate ==
Climate data for Lanxi, elevation 50 m (160 ft), (1991–2020 normals, extremes 1981–present)
Month	Jan	Feb	Mar	Apr	May	Jun	Jul	Aug	Sep	Oct	Nov	Dec	Year
Record high °C (°F)	24.2 (75.6)	28.2 (82.8)	33.5 (92.3)	34.1 (93.4)	37.5 (99.5)	38.1 (100.6)	41.4 (106.5)	41.7 (107.1)	39.5 (103.1)	36.8 (98.2)	31.3 (88.3)	24.3 (75.7)	41.7 (107.1)
Mean daily maximum °C (°F)	9.9 (49.8)	12.7 (54.9)	16.9 (62.4)	23.1 (73.6)	27.8 (82.0)	29.9 (85.8)	34.7 (94.5)	34.2 (93.6)	29.8 (85.6)	24.8 (76.6)	18.8 (65.8)	12.5 (54.5)	22.9 (73.3)
Daily mean °C (°F)	5.9 (42.6)	8.2 (46.8)	12.1 (53.8)	17.9 (64.2)	22.8 (73.0)	25.6 (78.1)	30.0 (86.0)	29.4 (84.9)	25.2 (77.4)	19.9 (67.8)	14.1 (57.4)	8.0 (46.4)	18.3 (64.9)
Mean daily minimum °C (°F)	3.2 (37.8)	5.0 (41.0)	8.6 (47.5)	14.0 (57.2)	19.0 (66.2)	22.5 (72.5)	26.3 (79.3)	25.8 (78.4)	21.8 (71.2)	16.3 (61.3)	10.7 (51.3)	4.9 (40.8)	14.8 (58.7)
Record low °C (°F)	−5.1 (22.8)	−4.5 (23.9)	−2.5 (27.5)	3.0 (37.4)	10.2 (50.4)	14.0 (57.2)	19.0 (66.2)	19.1 (66.4)	13.3 (55.9)	4.8 (40.6)	−0.7 (30.7)	−6.1 (21.0)	−6.1 (21.0)
Average precipitation mm (inches)	83.9 (3.30)	89.8 (3.54)	162.6 (6.40)	164.3 (6.47)	184.4 (7.26)	292.3 (11.51)	144.0 (5.67)	126.6 (4.98)	75.8 (2.98)	50.8 (2.00)	71.3 (2.81)	64.3 (2.53)	1,510.1 (59.45)
Average precipitation days (≥ 0.1 mm)	13.2	13.0	16.4	15.2	15.0	16.8	10.9	12.8	10.0	7.4	10.0	9.9	150.6
Average snowy days	3.1	2.3	0.5	0	0	0	0	0	0	0	0.1	1.3	7.3
Average relative humidity (%)	75	73	73	71	71	77	69	70	72	70	73	72	72
Mean monthly sunshine hours	83.0	87.8	102.0	121.8	139.3	115.8	217.9	200.3	151.3	142.8	112.7	108.6	1,583.3
Percentage possible sunshine	26	28	27	31	33	28	51	50	41	41	35	34	35
Source: China Meteorological Administrationall-time extreme temperature
